= Lamborghini Gallardo =

Sports car produced by Lamborghini

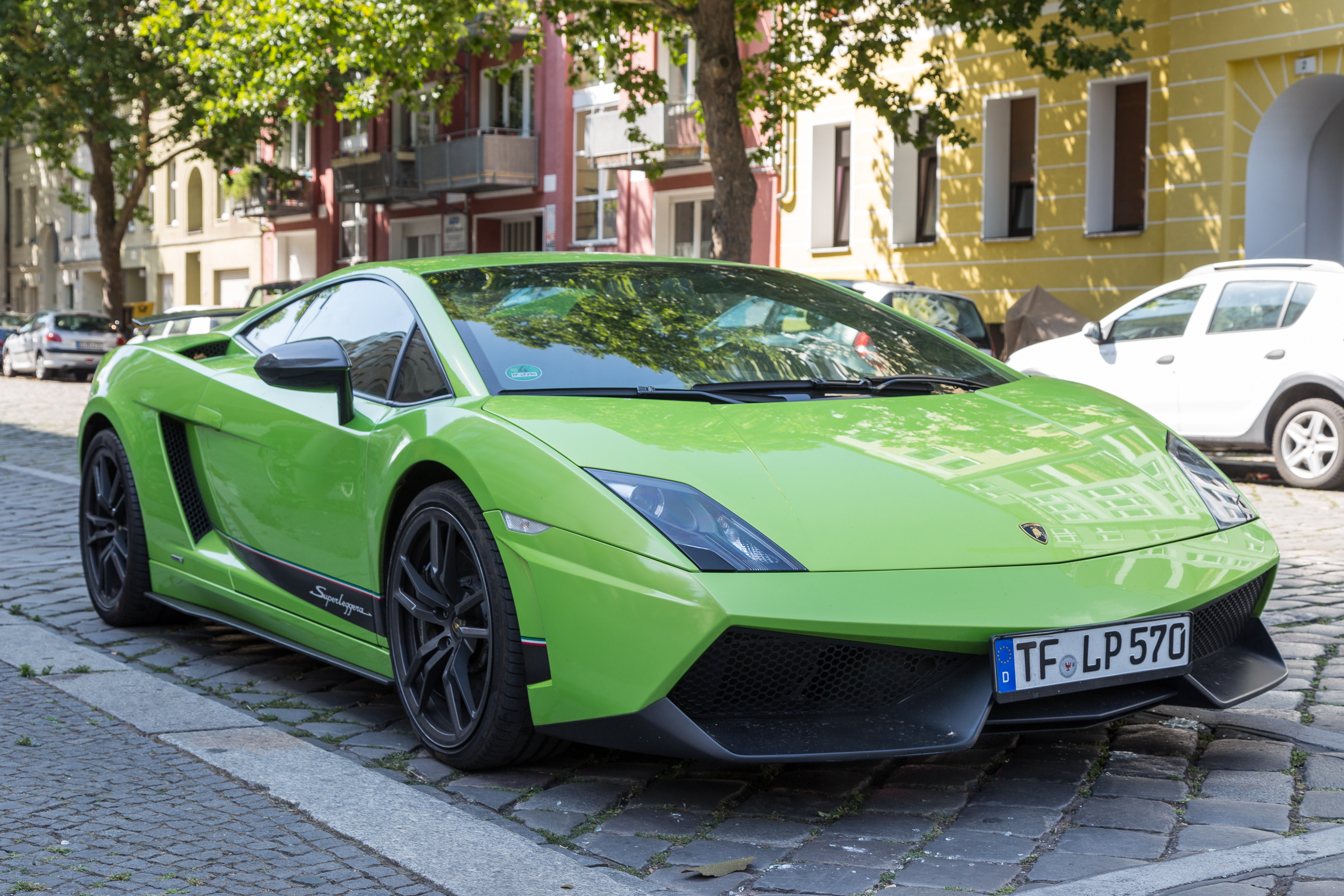
- 2008–2013 Lamborghini Gallardo Superleggera

Overview
- Manufacturer: Lamborghini
- Production: 2003–2013; 14,022 produced
- Assembly: Italy: Sant'Agata Bolognese
- Designer: Fabrizio Giugiaro at Italdesign (initial design); Luc Donckerwolke (final design); Walter de Silva (facelift)

Body and chassis
- Class: Sports car (S)
- Body style: 2-door coupé 2-door convertible (Spyder)
- Layout: Longitudinal, mid-engine, all-wheel-drive (Gallardo 5.0, LP 560-4 & LP 570-4); Rear mid-engine, rear-wheel-drive (LP 550-2)
- Related: Audi R8 (Type 42)

Powertrain
- Engine: 5.0 L Lamborghini even firing V10 (pre-facelift); 5.2 L Lamborghini CEH odd firing V10 (facelift)
- Transmission: 6-speed Graziano manual 6-speed e-gear Graziano automated manual

Dimensions
- Wheelbase: 2,560 mm (100.8 in)
- Length: 4,300–4,386 mm (169.3–172.7 in)
- Width: 1,900 mm (74.8 in)
- Height: Coupé: 1,165 mm (45.9 in); Spyder: 1,184 mm (46.6 in)
- Kerb weight: LP 560-4: 1,501 kg (3,310 lb); Gallardo coupé: 1,597 kg (3,520 lb); Spyder: 1,733 kg (3,820 lb); Superleggera: 1,558 kg (3,434 lb); LP 550-2 Valentino Balboni: 1,547 kg (3,410 lb); LP 570-4 Superleggera: 1,520 kg (3,350 lb)

Chronology
- Predecessor: Lamborghini Jalpa
- Successor: Lamborghini Huracán

Lamborghini Gallardo LP570-4 Superleggera at the Goodwood Festival of Speed 2010

The Lamborghini Gallardo (/ɡaɪˈjɑːrdoʊ/; Spanish: [ɡaˈʝaɾ.ð̞o]) is a sports car built by the Italian automotive manufacturer Lamborghini from 2003 to 2013. It is Lamborghini's second car released under parent company Audi, and the best-selling model at the time with 14,022 built throughout its production run. Named after a famous breed of fighting bull, the V10 powered Gallardo was Lamborghini's sales leader and stable-mate to a succession of V12 flagship models—first to the Murciélago (4,099 built between 2001 and 2010), then to the Aventador, being the first entry-level Lamborghini in one-and-half decades. On 25 November 2013, the last Gallardo was rolled off the production line. The Gallardo was replaced by the Huracán in 2014.

== Overview ==
After Megatech purchased Automobili Lamborghini S.P.A in 1994, Italdesign Giugiaro was hired to design concept cars to replace their existing models. One of the concepts built by them was the Calà, intended to replace the Jalpa. It was displayed at the 1995 Geneva Motor Show.

After the Volkswagen Group took hold of the company in 1998, the Lamborghini Gallardo was built on the basis of the Calà and had many features absorbed from the concept car such as the exterior design and the traditional V10 engine.

The car name is taken from the 18th century Spanish bullfighting breeder Francisco Gallardo. It means "gallant".

== Specifications ==
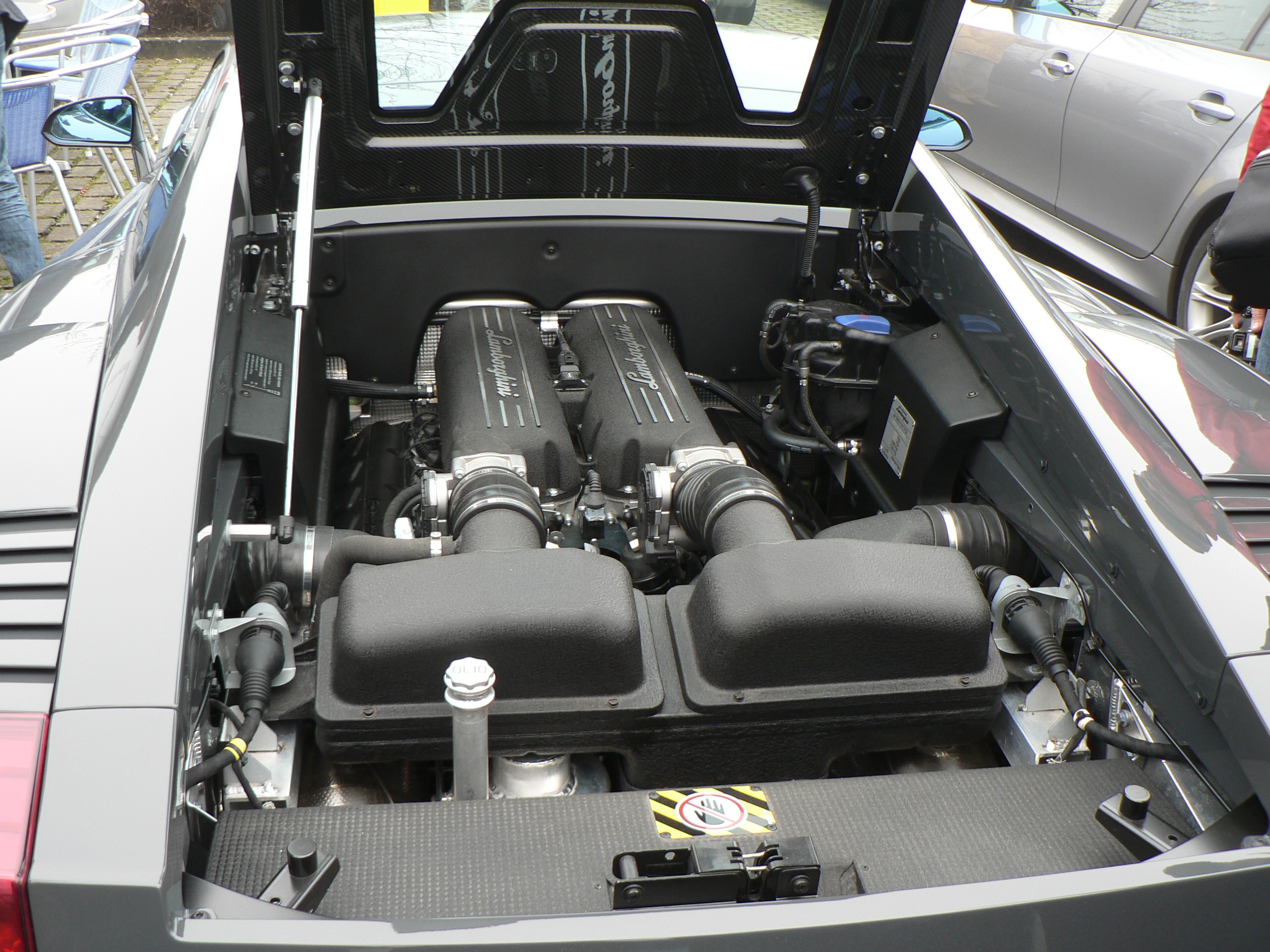
V10 engine of the Gallardo Superleggera (pre-facelift)

Models	Coupé 2003–2005	Coupé 2006–2008	Spyder 2006–2008	Superleggera	LP 560-4	LP 560-4 Spyder	LP 550-2 rear wheel drive	LP 570-4 Superleggera Edizione Tecnica/Performante Spyder
DOHC 4 valves per cylinder V10 engine
Displacement, type	4,961 cc (5.0 L; 302.7 cu in), even firing				5,204 cc (5.2 L; 317.6 cu in), odd firing			
Power at rpm	500 PS (368 kW; 493 hp) at 7,800	520 PS (382 kW; 513 hp) at 8,000		530 PS (390 kW; 523 hp) at 8,000	560 PS (412 kW; 552 hp) at 8,000		550 PS (405 kW; 542 hp) at 8,000	570 PS (419 kW; 562 hp) at 8,000
Torque at rpm	510 N⋅m (376 lb⋅ft) at 4,500	510 N⋅m (376 lb⋅ft) at 4,250			540 N⋅m (398 lb⋅ft) at 6,500			
Performance
0 to 100 km/h (62 mph) (sec)	4.2	4.0	4.3	3.8	3.7	4.0	3.9 (4.2 Spyder)	3.4 (3.9 Spyder)
0 to 200 km/h (120 mph) (sec)	14.5	13.6	14.3	12.4	9.5	11.7	10.6	?
1/4 mile	12.4 s at 118 mph (190 km/h)	12.1 s at 120 mph (193 km/h)	–	11.7 s at 123 mph (198 km/h)	11.2 s at 129.5 mph (208.4 km/h) (R&T); 11.9 s at 120.5 mph (193.9 km/h) (MT)	12 s at 124 mph (200 km/h)	11.5 s at 126.7 mph (203.9 km/h) (R&T); 11.5 s at 125.6 mph (202.1 km/h) (MT)	–
Top speed	309 km/h (192 mph)	315 km/h (196 mph)	315 km/h (196 mph)	315 km/h (196 mph)	325 km/h (202 mph)	324 km/h (201 mph)	320 km/h (199 mph)	325 km/h (202 mph)

=== Awards and recognition ===
- 2006 Top Gear Dream Car of the Year
- 2009 Top Gear Car of the Year – Lamborghini LP 550-2 Balboni

== Gallardo (2003–2008) ==
=== Lamborghini Gallardo Coupe ===
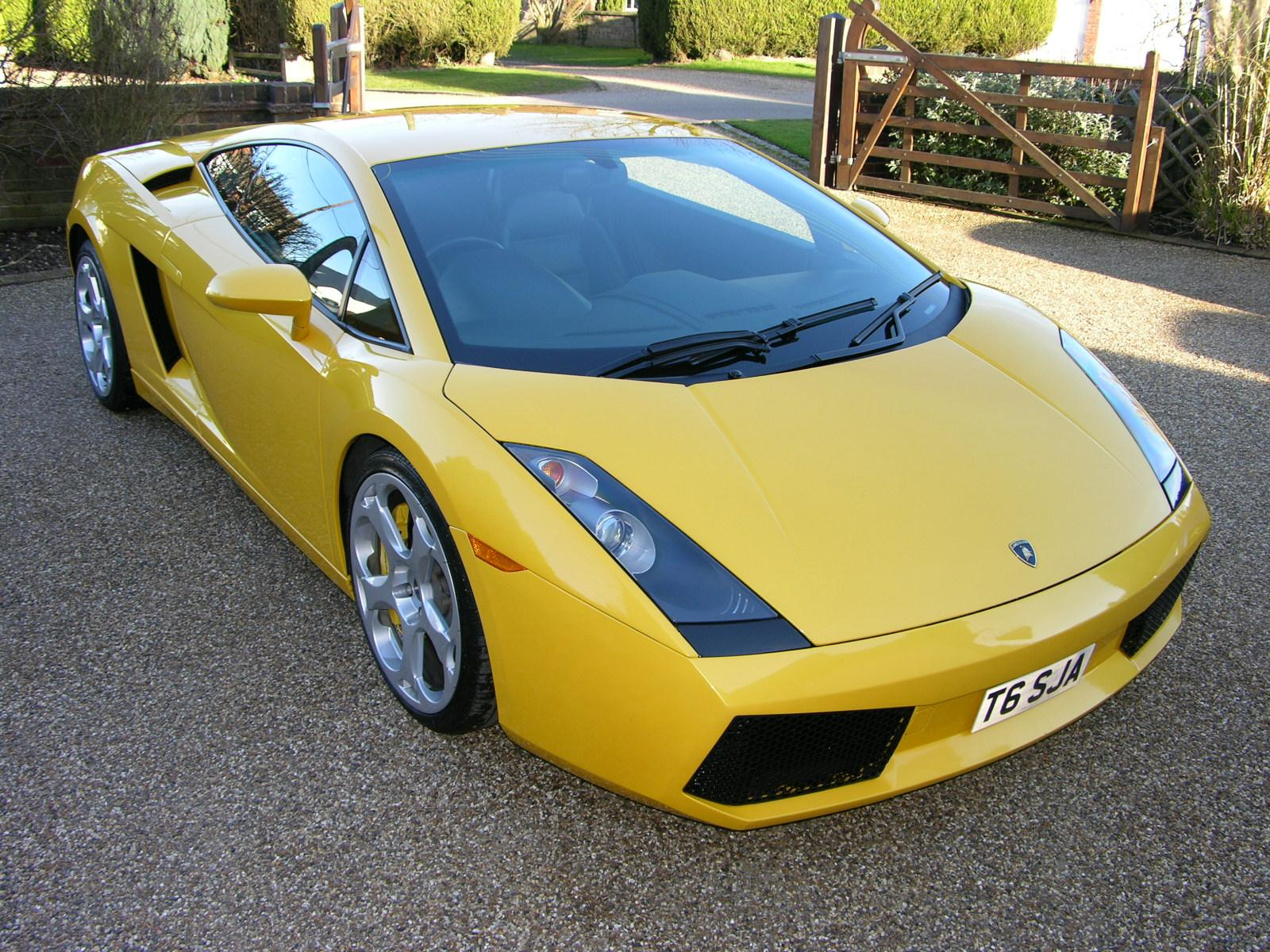
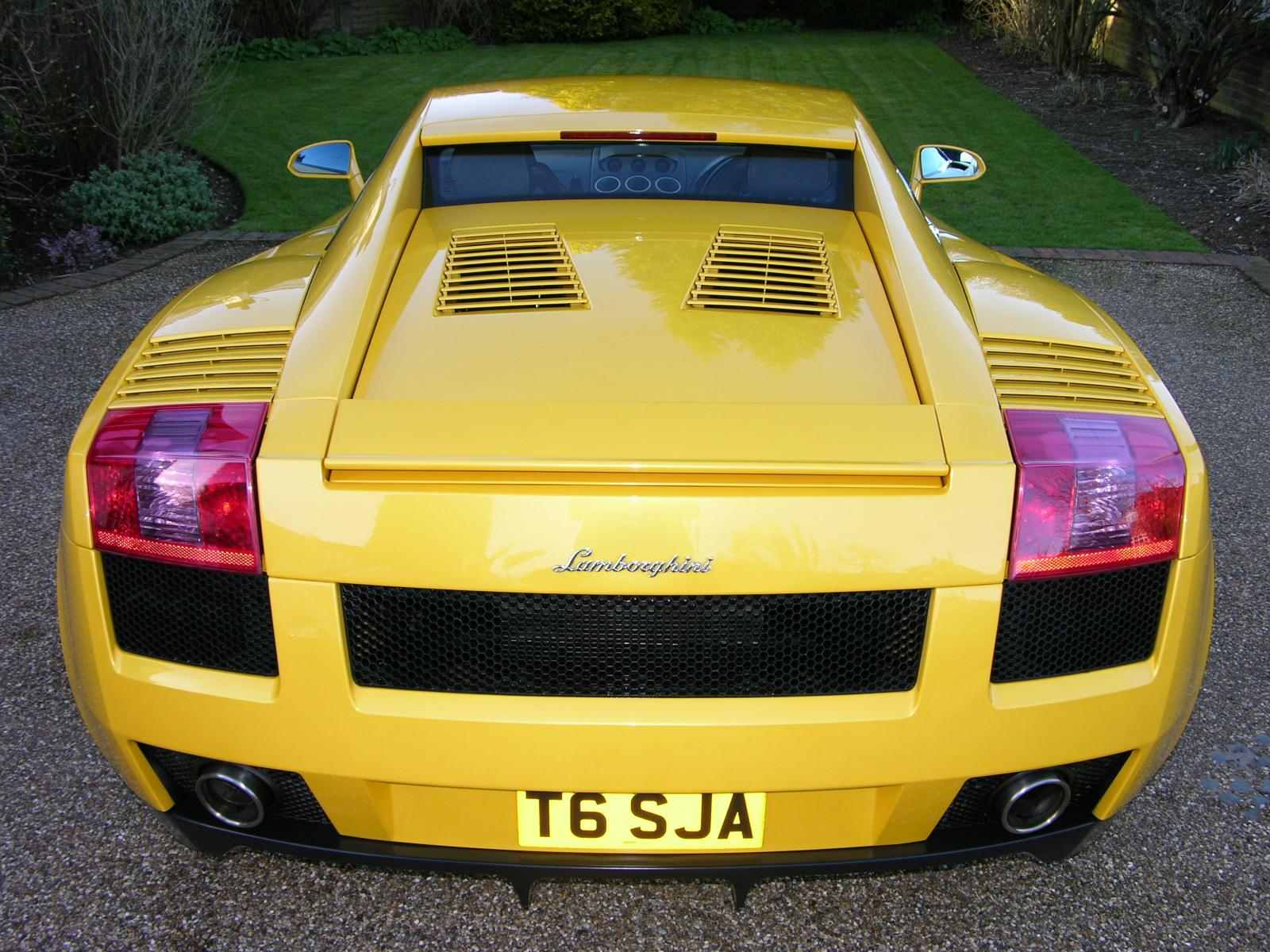
Gallardo Coupé front and rear view

The original Gallardo was powered with an even firing 4,961 cc (5.0 L) 90 degree V10 engine generating a maximum power output of 500 PS (368 kW; 493 hp) at 7500 rpm and 510 N⋅m (376 lb⋅ft) of torque at 4500 rpm. The Gallardo was offered with two choices of transmission; a conventional (H-pattern) six-speed manual transmission, and a six-speed electro-hydraulically actuated single-clutch automated manual transmission that Lamborghini called "E-gear". Both gearboxes were built by Graziano Trasmissioni. The "E-gear" transmission provides gear changes more quickly than could be achieved through a manual shift. The driver shifts up and down via paddles behind the steering wheel, but can also change to an automatic mode via the gear selector located in place of the gear shift lever. The vehicle was designed by Luc Donckerwolke and was based on the 1995 Calà concept designed by Italdesign Giugiaro.

==== 2005 Coupé update ====
For the 2006 model year (launched in late 2005), Lamborghini introduced many changes to the car to counter some criticisms garnered from the press and owners. The exhaust system was changed to a more sporty one (including a flap to make it quieter during city driving), the suspension was revised, a new steering rack was fitted, the engine power was increased by 20 PS to a maximum of 520 PS (382 kW; 513 hp), and the biggest change was overall lower gearing ratios, especially in 1st to 5th gear. These changes gave the car a much better performance than the original and were also included in the limited edition Gallardo SE.

=== Lamborghini Gallardo Spyder ===
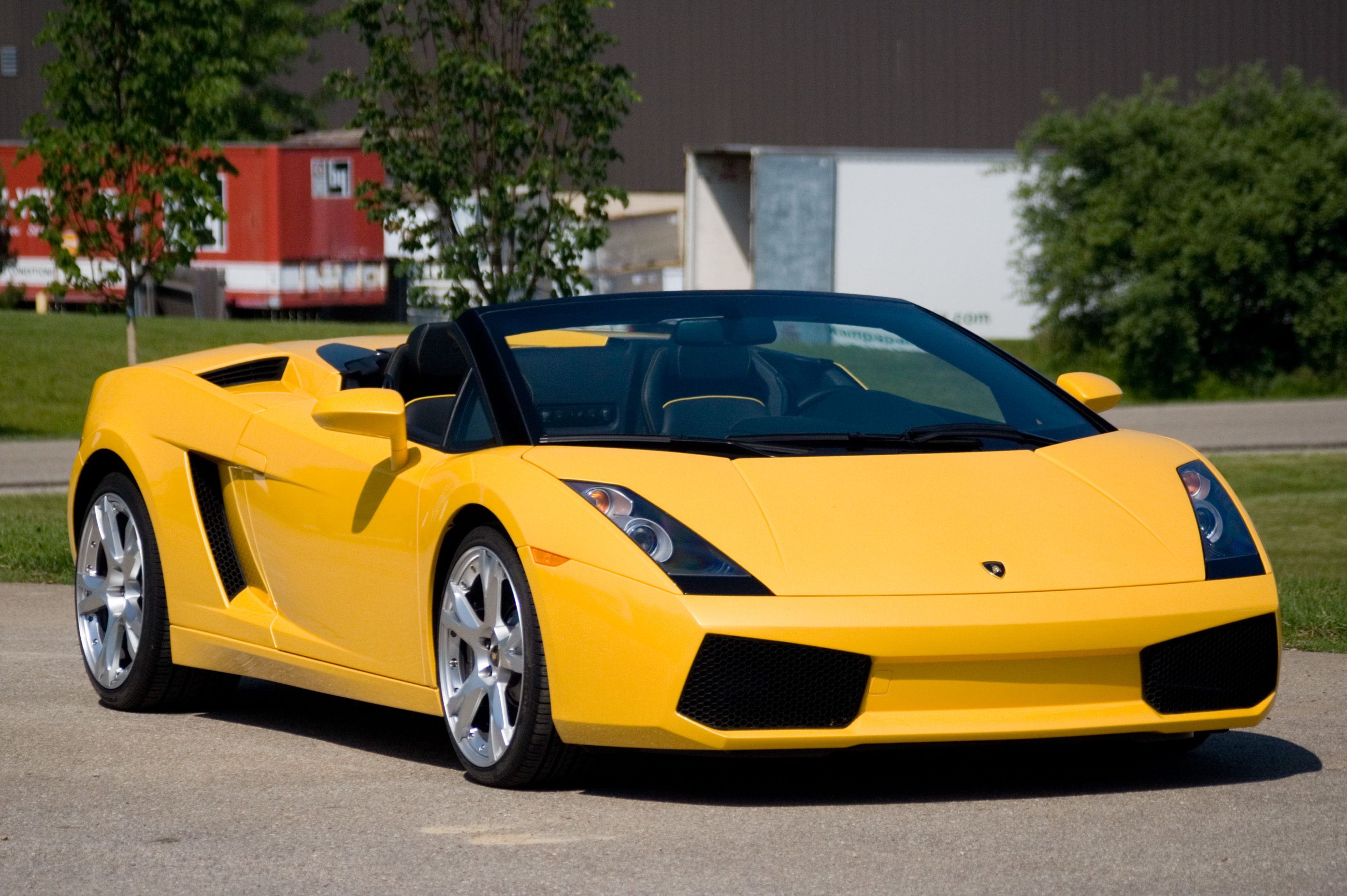
Gallardo Spyder front view

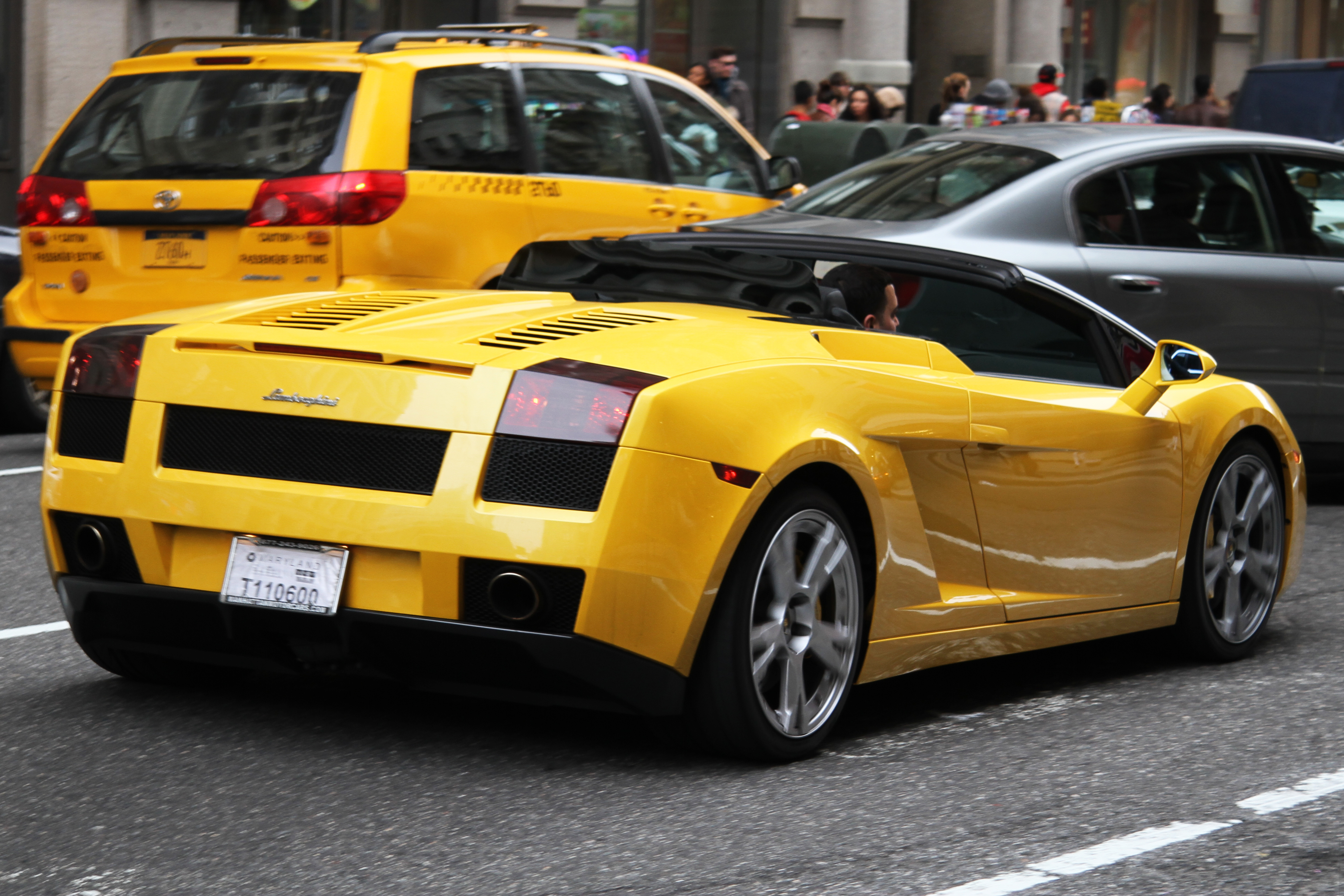
Gallardo Spyder rear view

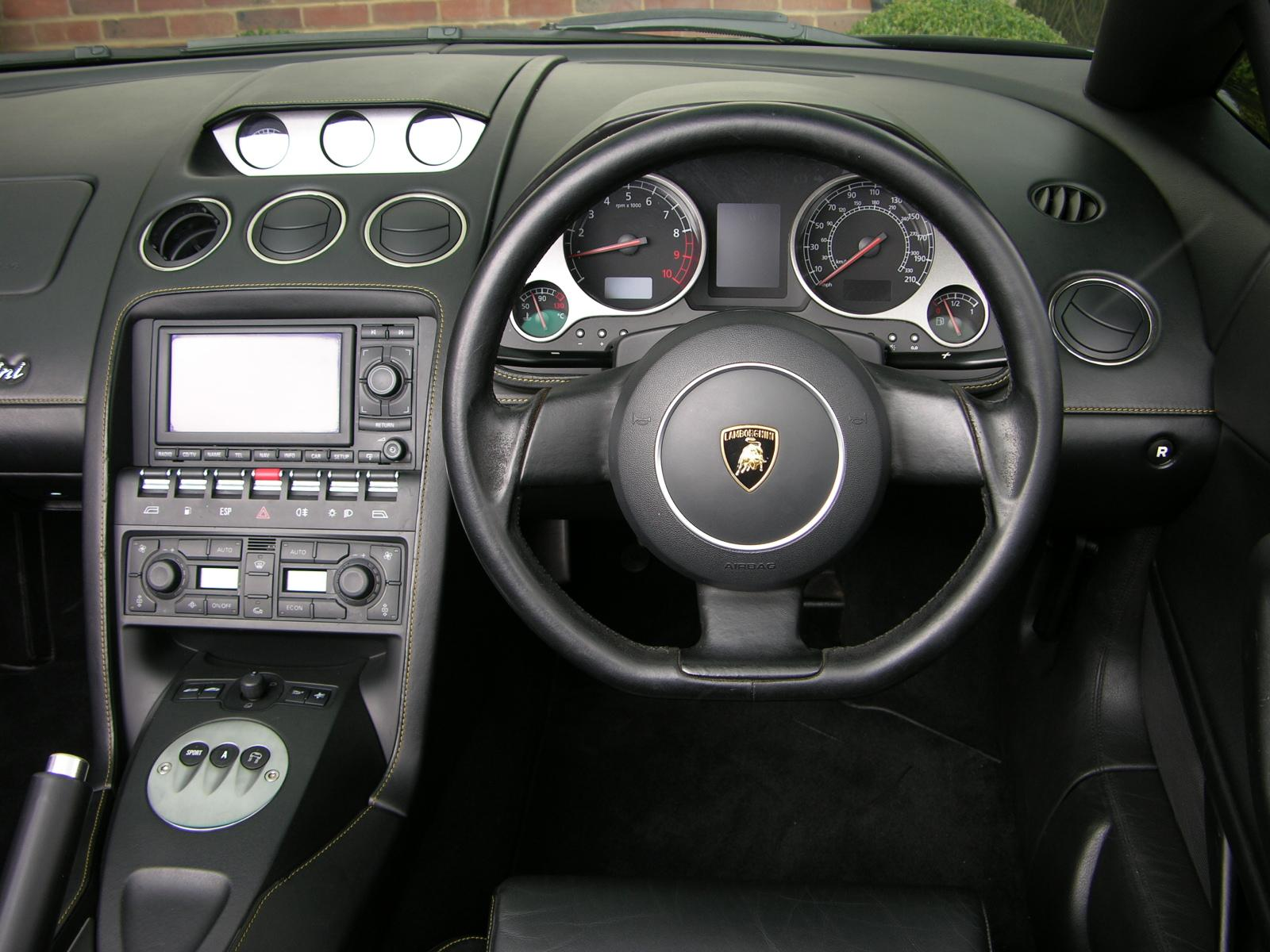
Gallardo Spyder interior

The convertible variant of the Gallardo, called the Gallardo Spyder, was unveiled at the Los Angeles Auto Show in January 2006. It was considered by the company to be an entirely new model, with the engine having a power output of 520 PS (382 kW; 513 hp) and a low-ratio six-speed manual transmission. The Spyder has a retractable soft-top.

=== Lamborghini Gallardo Superleggera ===
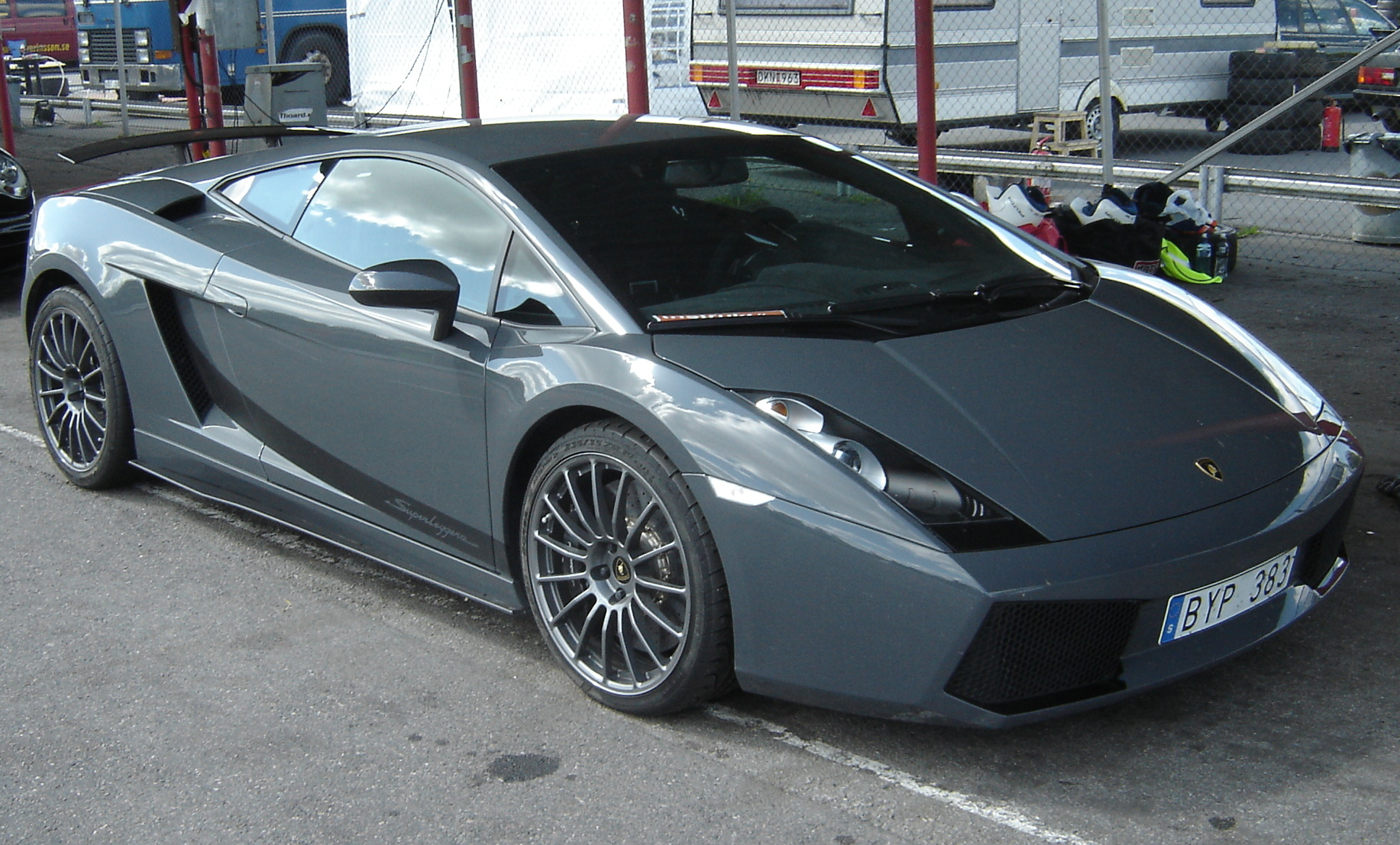
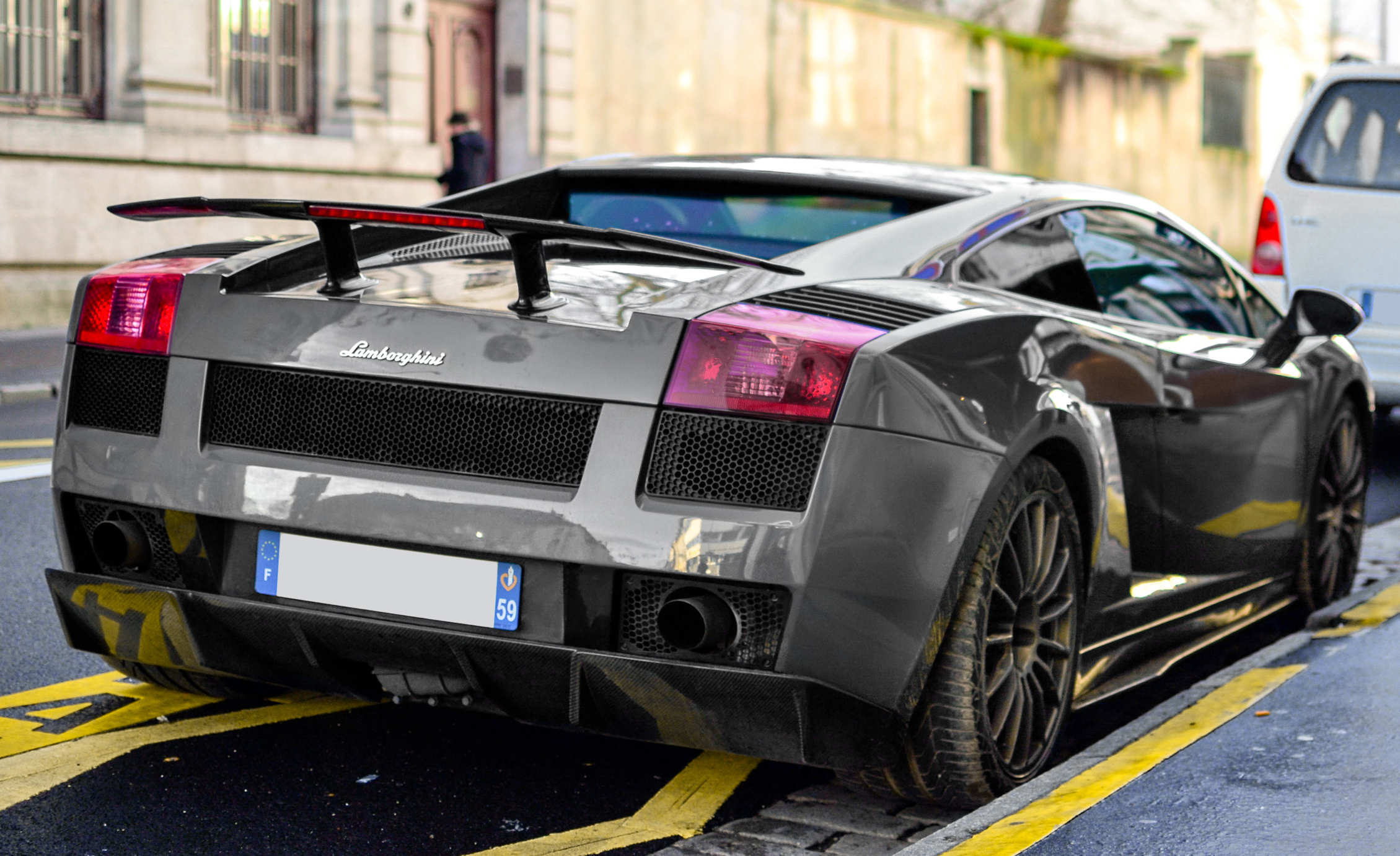
Gallardo Superleggera front and rear view

At the 2007 Geneva Auto Show, Lamborghini unveiled the Gallardo Superleggera. The name paid tribute to the construction style of the first Lamborghini production model, the 350 GT, designed and built by Carrozzeria Touring and its emphasis on weight reduction. The Superleggera is lighter than the base model by 100 kg (220 lb) due to the use of carbon fiber panels for the rear diffuser, undertray, the rearview-mirror housings, the interior door panels, the central tunnel, engine cover; titanium wheel nuts and carbon fibre sports seats. The engine power was uprated by 10 PS (7 kW; 10 hp) courtesy of an improved intake, exhaust and ECU for a total power output of 530 PS (390 kW; 523 hp). The 6-speed E-Gear transmission was standard on US spec models with the 6-speed manual transmission offered as a no cost option. Production of the Superleggera was limited to 618 units worldwide.

==== Recall ====
Lamborghini recalled about 1,500 Gallardo Coupé and Spyder models, from model years 2004 to 2006, because of the possibility of power steering fluid leaking and the risk of fire. The cars were built from May 2003 through April 2008.

== Facelift (2008–2013) ==
=== Lamborghini Gallardo LP 560-4 ===
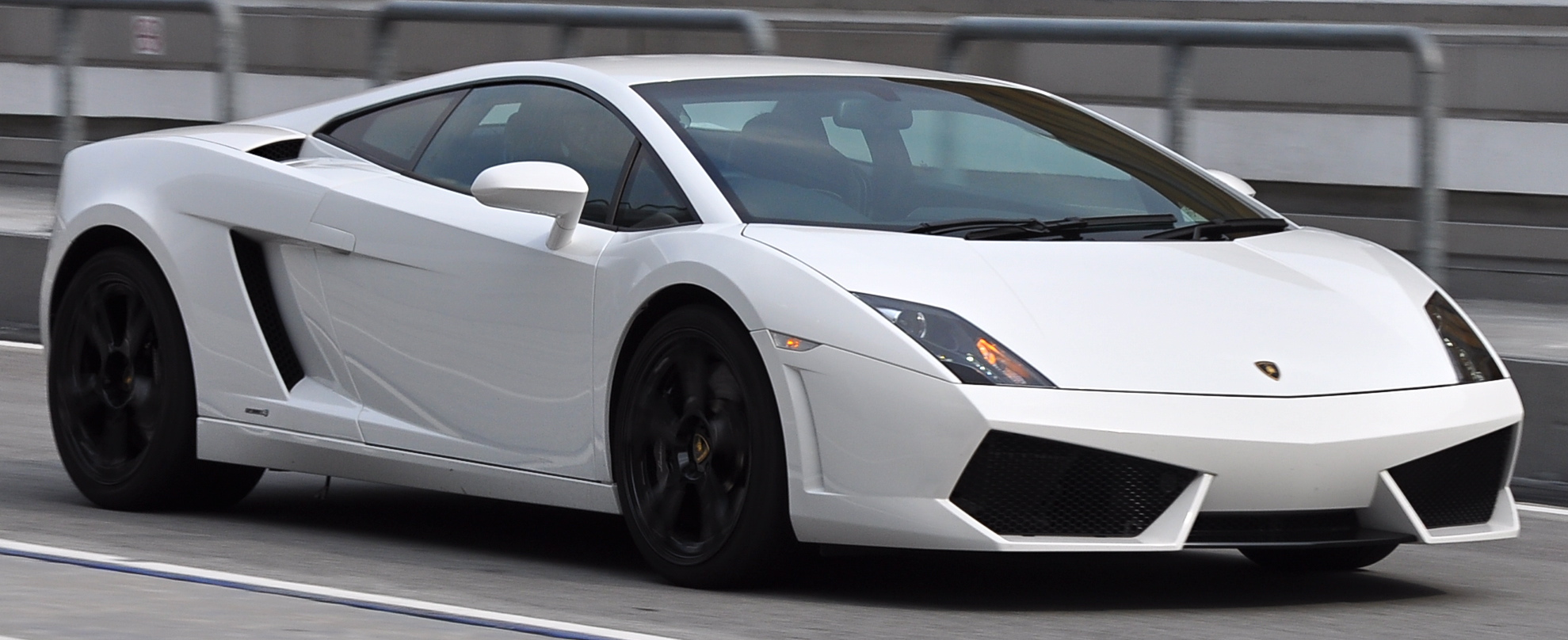
Gallardo LP 560-4 front view

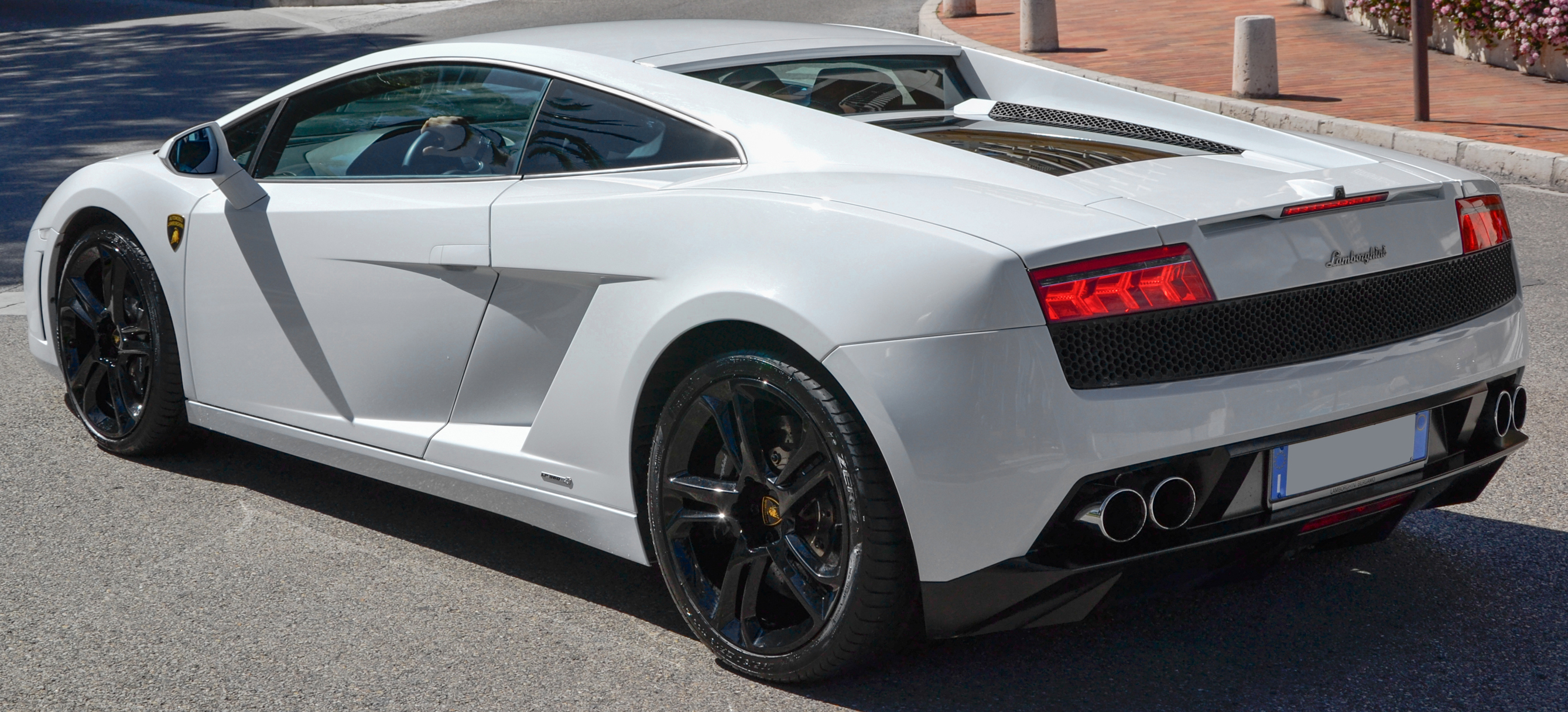
Gallardo LP 560-4 rear view

Presented at the 2008 Geneva Motor Show, the Gallardo LP 560-4 was a significant update of the Gallardo, powered by a new, uneven firing 5.2 L (5,200 cc; 320 cu in) V10 engine that produces 560 PS (412 kW; 552 hp) at 8,000 rpm and 540 N⋅m (398 lb⋅ft) of torque at 6,500 rpm. Featuring "Iniezione Diretta Stratificata" direct fuel injection system to improve efficiency; fuel consumption and CO_{2} emissions were reduced by 18% despite the increase in performance. The car was redesigned, inspired by the Murciélago LP 640 and its derivative model the Reventón.

The new engine, 40 PS (29 kW; 39 hp) more powerful than in the previous car, comes with two transmission choices: a 6-speed manual or 6-speed E-gear, the latter of which was revised to offer a Corsa mode which makes 40% quicker shifts than before and decreases traction control restrictions, a Thrust Mode launch control system was also added. Accompanied with a 20 kg (44 lb) weight reduction. All the improvements add up to a claimed performance of 0–100 km/h (62 mph) in 3.7 seconds, 0–200 km/h (124 mph) of 11.8 and a top speed of 325 km/h (202 mph). Car and Driver tested the LP 560-4 in January 2009 and achieved a 0–60 mph (97 km/h) time of 3.2 seconds.

The MSRP base price was $198,000 in the US and £147,330 (including NavTrak vehicle tracking system and delivery package) in the UK. The first US car was sold in the 16th Annual Race to Erase MS charity auction for $198,000 to former True Religion Jeans co-founder/co-creator Kymberly Gold and music producer Victor Newman.

=== Lamborghini Gallardo LP 560-4 Spyder ===
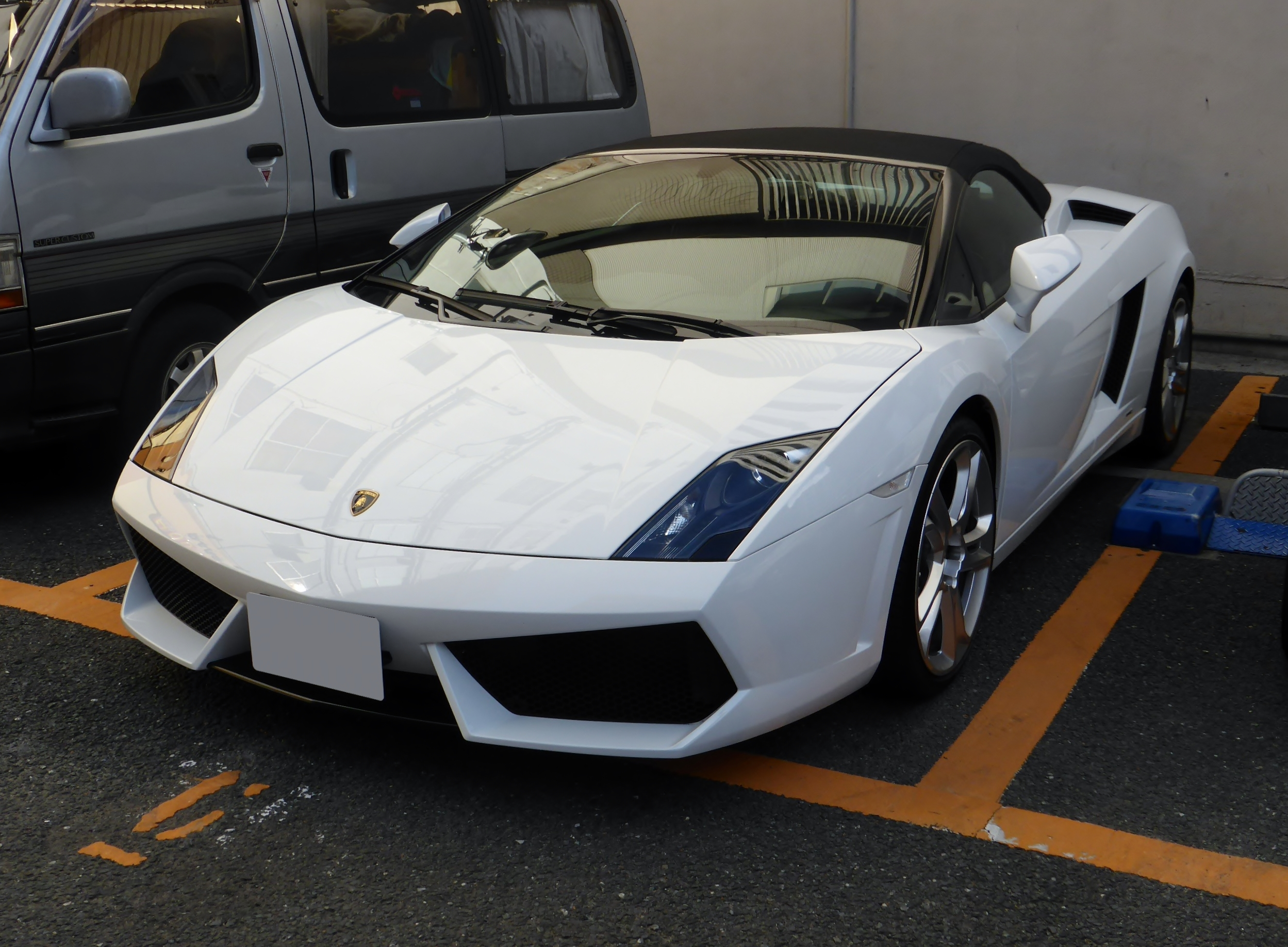
Gallardo LP 560-4 Spyder

The Lamborghini Gallardo LP 560-4 Spyder was unveiled at the 2008 LA Auto Show. as the replacement for the previous Gallardo Spyder. It is the convertible model of the Gallardo LP 560-4 and as such possess all of its features like the new uneven firing 5.2 L (320 cu in) V10 engine, improved E-gear transmission and 20 kg (44 lb) weight reduction. Performance has been improved to 0-100 km/h (62 mph) in 3.8 seconds, 0-200 km/h (124 mph) in 13.1 seconds, and a top speed of 324 km/h (201 mph).

=== Lamborghini Gallardo LP 570-4 Superleggera (2010–2013) ===
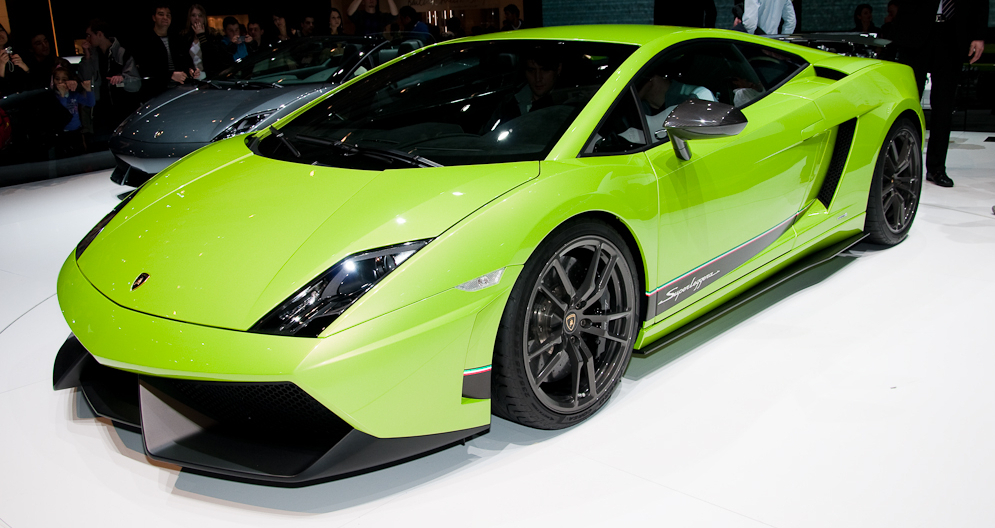
Gallardo LP 570-4 Superleggera

In March 2010, Lamborghini announced the release of the Gallardo LP 570-4 Superleggera, a lightweight and more powerful version of the Gallardo LP 560–4 in the same vein as the previous Superleggera. With carbon fibre used extensively inside and out to reduce weight to 1,340 kg (2,954 lb), making it the lightest road-going Lamborghini in the range. The odd firing 5.2 L V10 on the LP 570-4 got a power bump over the standard Gallardo to 570 PS (419 kW; 562 hp) at 8,000 rpm and 540 N⋅m (398 lb⋅ft) at 6,500 rpm of torque. Performance has been improved to 0-100 km/h (62 mph) in 3.2 seconds, and a 329 km/h (204 mph) top speed.

=== Lamborghini Gallardo LP 570-4 Spyder Performante (2011) ===
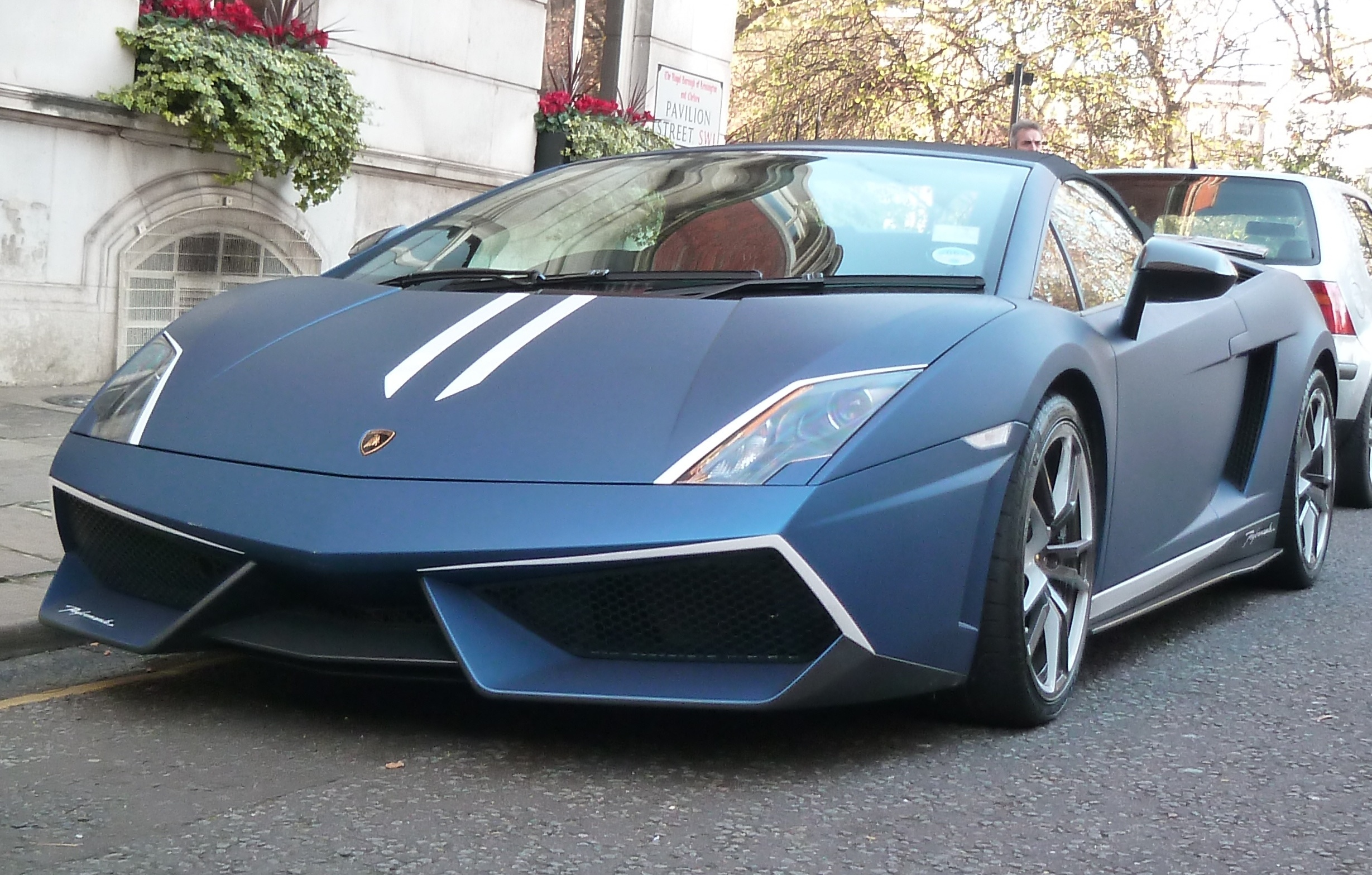
Gallardo LP 570-4 Spyder Performante

In November 2010, Lamborghini announced the LP 570-4 Spyder Performante, a convertible version of the LP 570-4 Superleggera. Employing the same odd firing 570 PS (419 kW; 562 hp) 5.2L V10 and with a curb weight of 1,485 kg (3,274 lb), heavier than the coupé as usual with coupé based convertibles, the LP 570-4 Spyder Performante goes from 0 to 100 km/h (62 mph) in 3.9 seconds, to 200 km/h (124 mph) in 12.0 seconds and has a top speed of 325 km/h (202 mph).

=== Lamborghini Gallardo LP 550-2 Coupé, LP 550–2 AD (2010–2013) ===
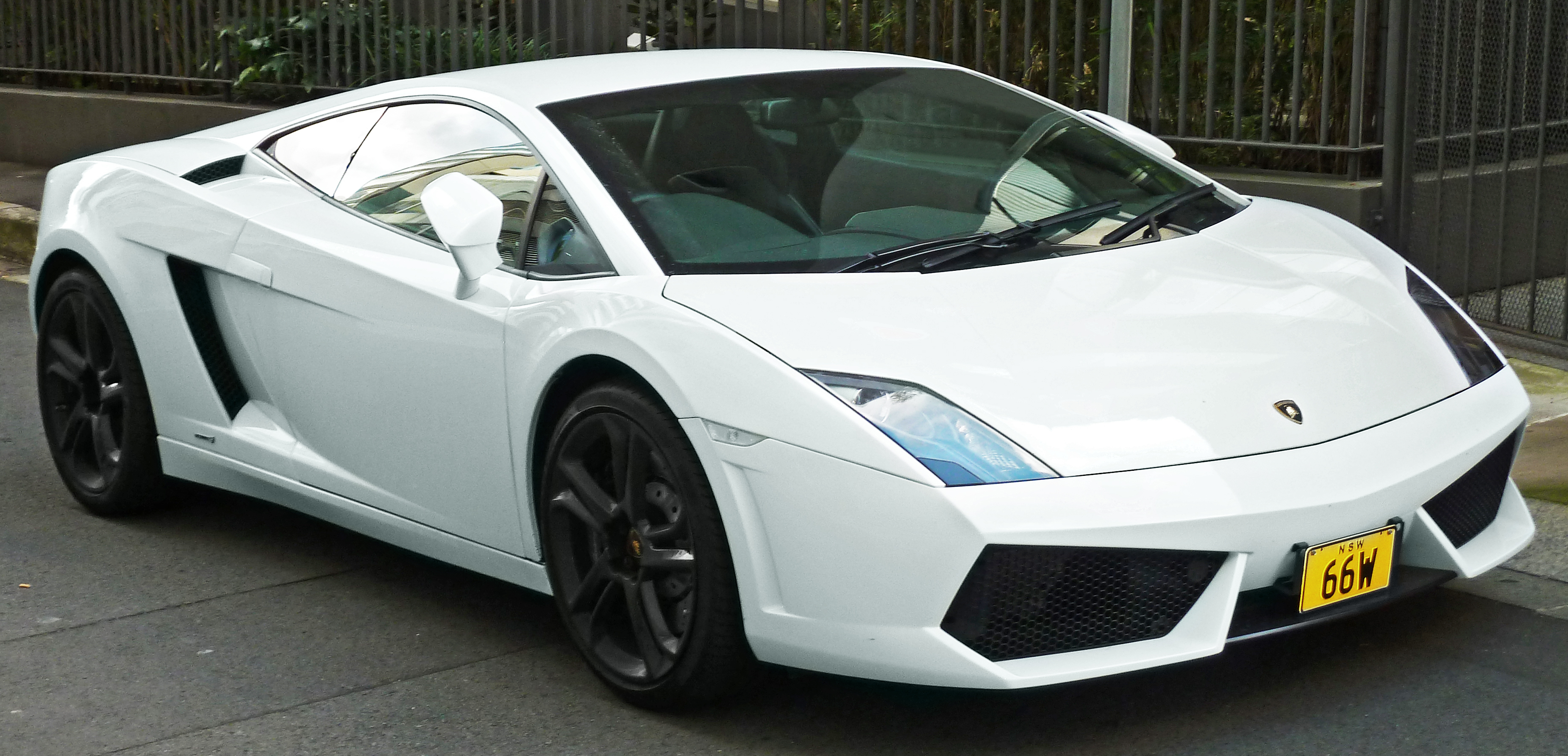
Gallardo LP 550-2 Coupé, LP 550–2 AD

Following the LP 550-2 Valentino Balboni and LP 550-2 Bicolore special editions, the LP 550-2 Coupé was offered by Lamborghini in the 2011 model year as the lowest-priced model in the Gallardo line-up. The rear-wheel-drive LP 550-2 Coupé is distinguished by unique black side skirts and "LP 550-2" badging, suspension tuning borrowed from the Valentino Balboni edition, and came equipped with a 6-speed manual transmission with E-gear available as a cost option.

The LP 550–2 AD is based on the LP 550-2 Coupé with Ad Personam customization, which includes transparent engine cover, engine room LED lighting, diamond pattern leather interior upholstery, travel package.

=== Lamborghini Gallardo LP 550-2 Spyder (2011–2013) ===
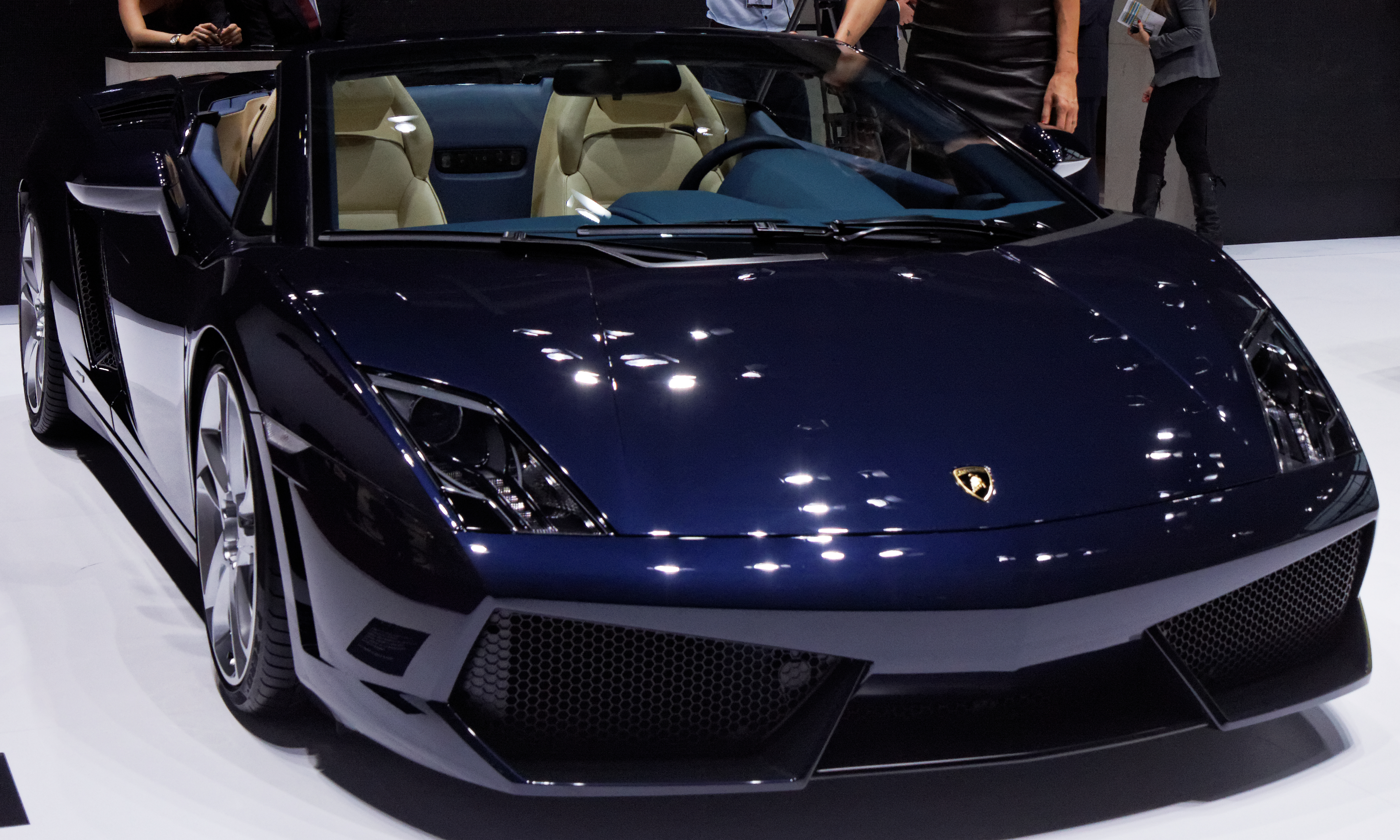
Gallardo LP 550-2 Spyder

In 2012, the LP 550-2 Spyder was introduced with the same specifications as the Coupé, as the lowest priced Spyder model.

The vehicle was unveiled in Balboni Ginza Tower.

=== Equipment ===
Marrone Apus (matte brown), Giallo Horus (matte gold), Nero Nemesis (matte black), Bianco Canopus (matte white) body colors were introduced to the Taiwan market on 10 August 2010.

=== Reception ===
In a test drive of the LP 550-2 Valentino Balboni, the test driver bearing the name of the car said he was against E-gear because it takes some amount of vehicle control away from the driver, and all-wheel drive Lamborghinis from the beginning and the company was divided over AWD cars. In that review, an LP 550–2 with E-Gear was tested.

=== Marketing ===
As part of the Gallardo LP 570-4 Superleggera launch in Taiwan, Jean-Michel Lorain of the La Côte Saint Jacques restaurant was invited by Taiwan Lamborghini dealer Gramus International Co., Ltd. and Taiwan American Express company to cook French meals at The Landis Taipei Paris 1930 between 1 December 2010 and 4 December 2010, and at the Le Moût restaurant between 6 December 2010 and 9 December 2010, with a Gallardo LP 570-4 Superleggera Nero Nemesis unveiled at the 1st-floor lounge of The Landis Taipei hotel. In addition, for Lamborghini buyers using an American Express card until 31 December 2010, all Lamborghini vehicles got an order price of 2 million NTD, and Lamborghini LP 570-4 Superleggera Nero Nemesis buyers using an American Express Centurion card can purchase the vehicle for 17,880,000 NTD.

=== Lamborghini Gallardo LP 550-2, LP 560-4 Edizione Tecnica (2012–2013) ===
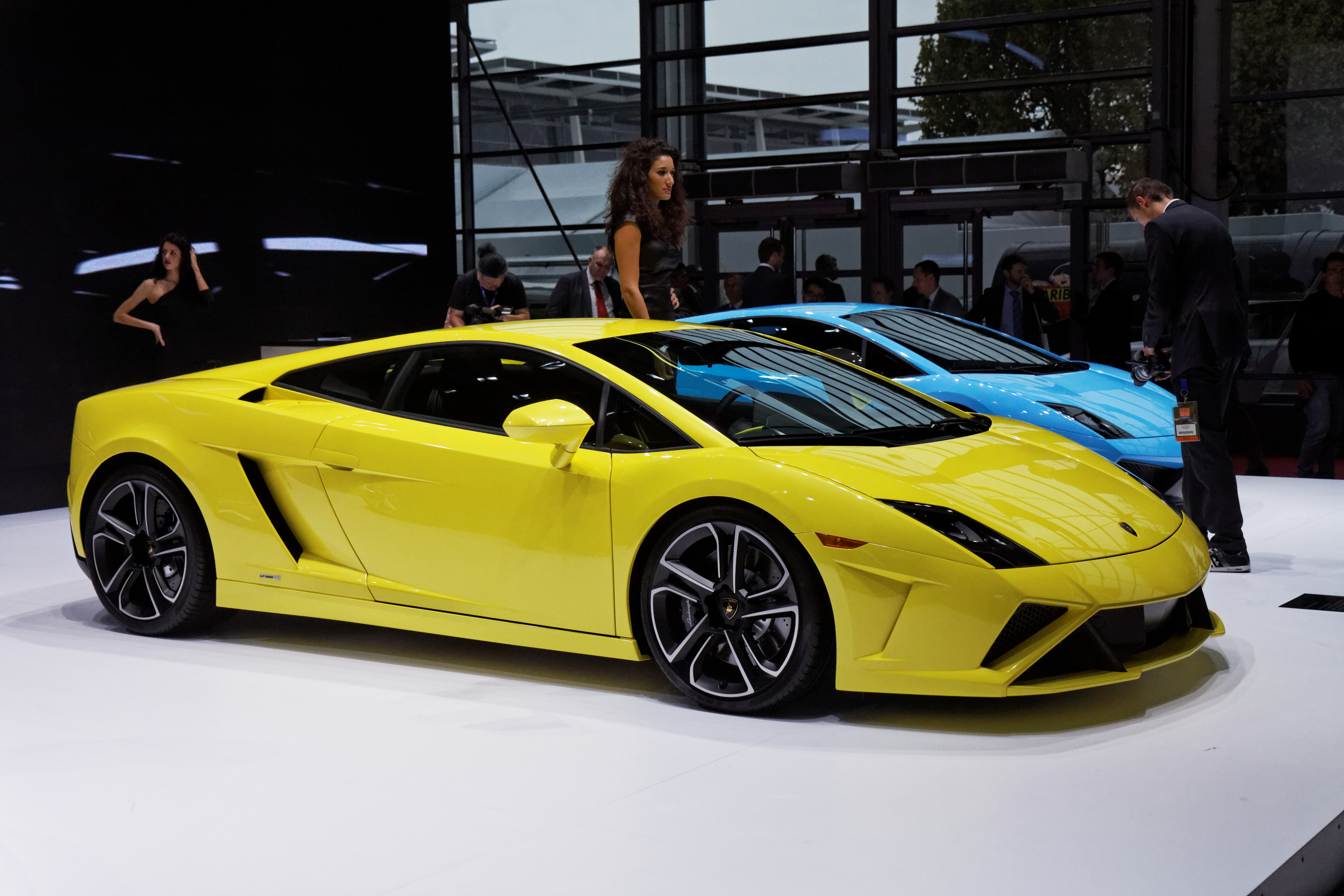
Gallardo LP 560-4 Edizione Technica

At the end of its production run, Lamborghini produced special editions of the Gallardo featuring parts from its Gallardo Super Trofeo race cars. These editions were based on all the basic variants of the Gallardo and the cars receiving such modifications were given the Edizione Technica designation in addition to their names.

Changes to the Gallardo LP 560-4 and the LP 550-2 includes revised front fascias with triangular and trapezoidal forms with diagonal elements in body color and black, larger air intakes ahead of the front wheels, new 19-inch "Apollo polished" alloy wheels in matte black with spokes in polished silver, redesigned rear end with a wider surface area, optional Style Package (high-gloss black paintwork on the underside of the front spoiler, front and rear grilles and the transverse element of the rear trim).

=== Lamborghini Gallardo LP 570-4 Edizione Tecnica (2012–2013) ===
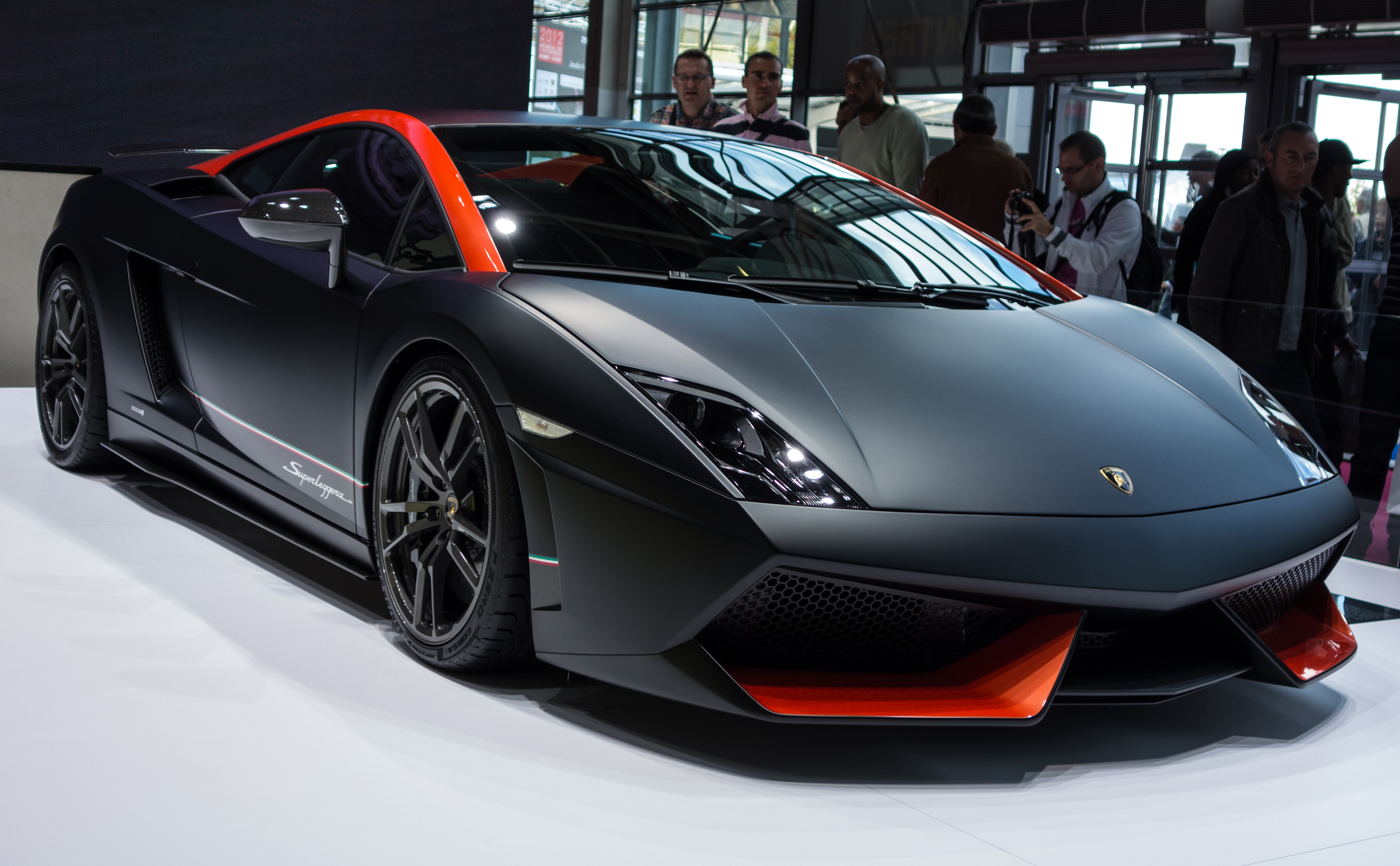
Gallardo LP 570-4 Edizione Tecnica

The LP 570-4 Edizione Tecnica was based on the LP 570-4 Superleggera and the LP 570-4 Spyder Performante, with a fixed rear wing, carbon-ceramic brakes, roof arch and front air intakes painted in contrasting color schemes (Nero Nemesis (matt black) body with Arancio Argos (orange) pillars and front air intakes, Bianco Canopus (matt white) body with Arancio Argos pillars and front air intakes, and Arancio Argos body with Nero Nemesis pillars and front air intakes).

The vehicles were unveiled at the 2012 Paris Motor Show, followed by the 2013 Shanghai Motor Show (in which a Gallardo LP 560-4 Spyder Edizione Technica in Grigio Telesto paint scheme was unveiled).

The vehicles were available at Lamborghini dealerships from November 2012. Early models include the LP 550-2 (Coupé/Spyder), LP 560-4 (Coupé/Spyder), LP 570-4 (Superleggera/Spyder Performante).

=== Lamborghini Gallardo LP 570-4 Super Trofeo 2013 (2012–2013) ===
The 2013 LP 570-4 Super Trofeo is a race car version of the Gallardo LP 570-4 for the Lamborghini Blancpain Super Trofeo series. It features adjustable aerodynamic devices, a ten-position rear wing, and improved front brake cooling over the 2012 Gallardo via remodeled brake ducts.

The vehicle was unveiled at the final round of the 2012 Lamborghini Blancpain Super Trofeo European series in Los Arcos, Navarra.

=== Lamborghini Gallardo LP 570-4 Squadra Corse (2013) ===
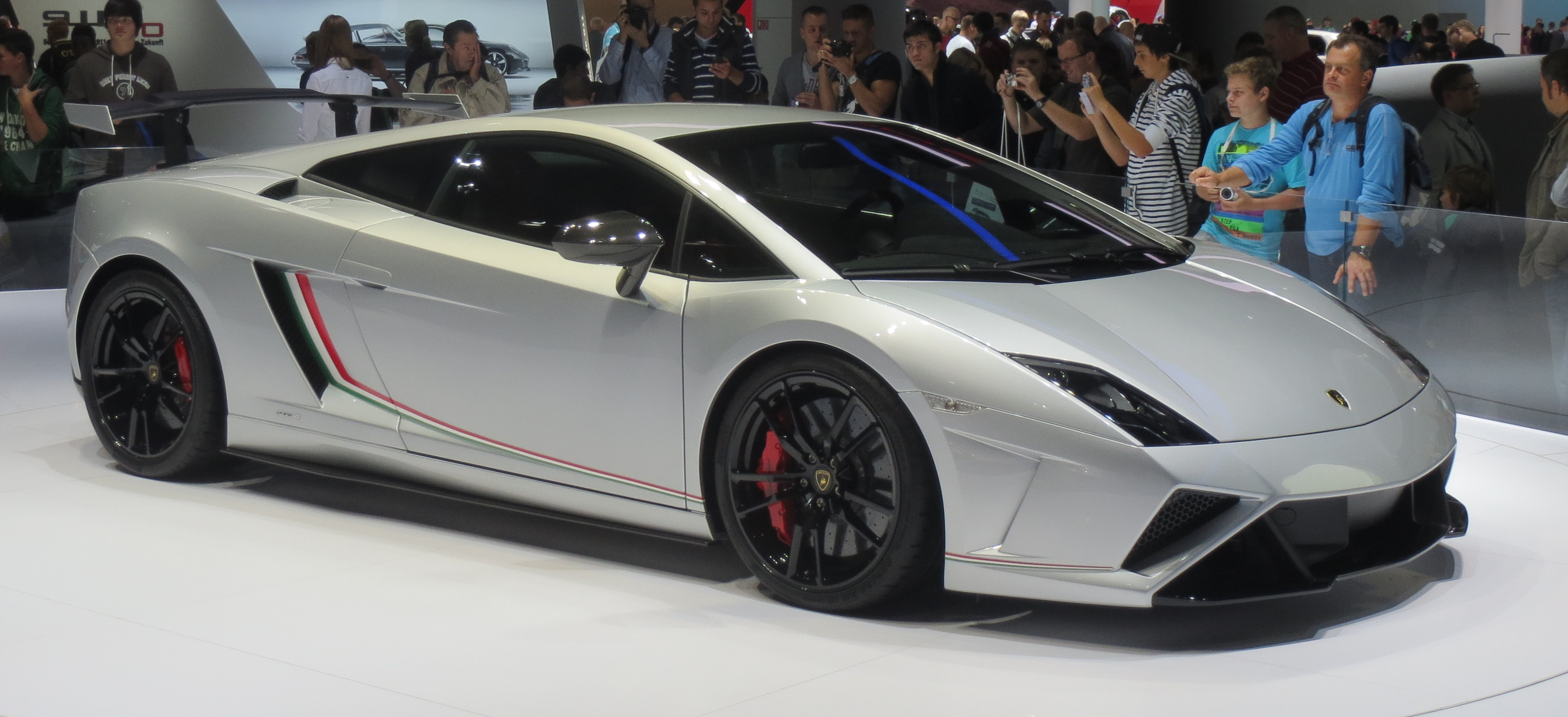
Gallardo Squadra Corse front view

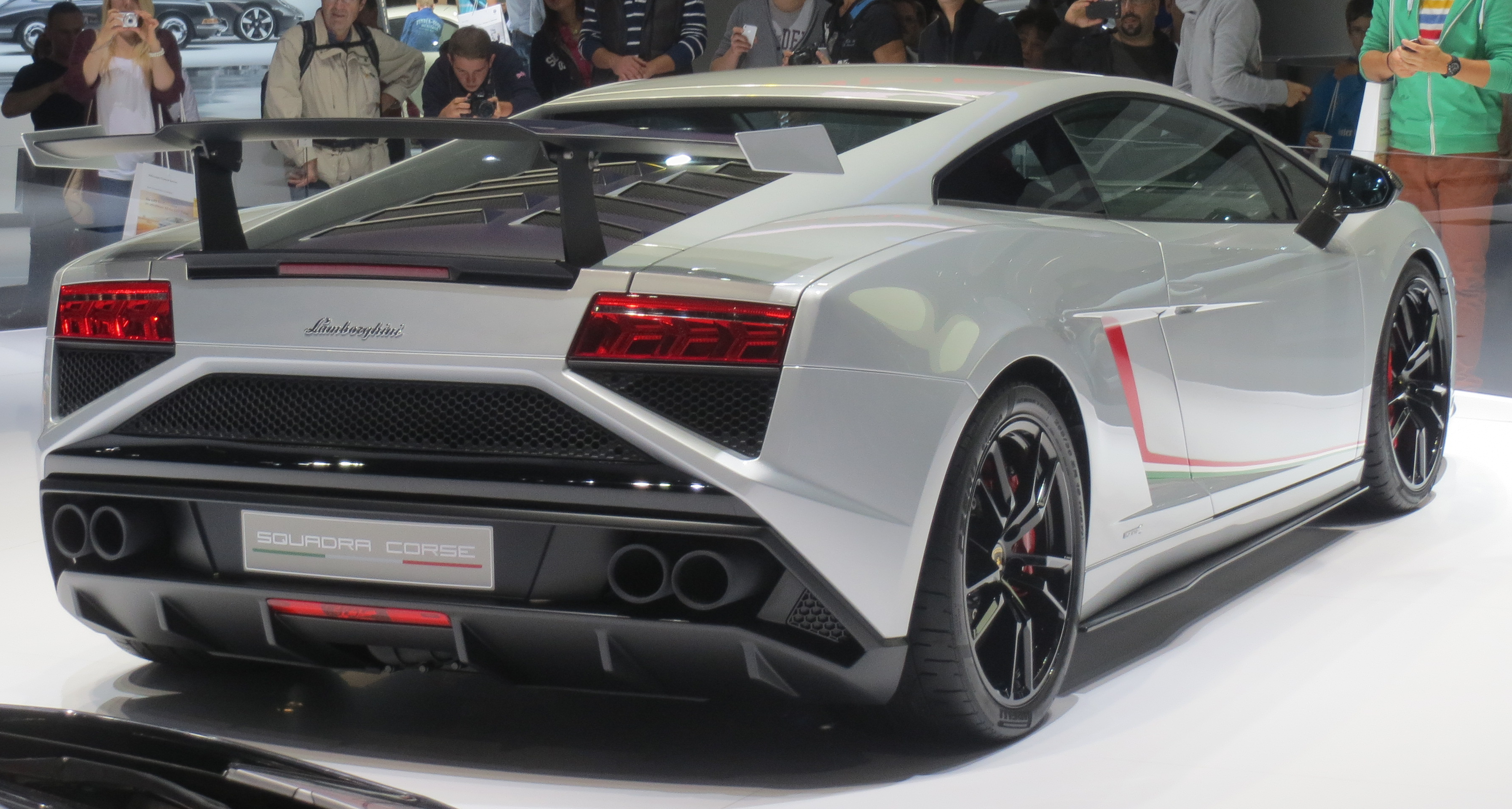
Gallardo Squadra Corse rear view

Unveiled at the 2013 Frankfurt Motor Show, the Lamborghini Gallardo LP 570-4 Squadra Corse is a limited production (50 units, 15 in USA, 3 in Canada) street-legal version of the Lamborghini Gallardo LP 570-4 Super Trofeo 2013 race car. It features a removable engine cover with quick-release system, different front and rear bumpers, rear wing and the engine cover made from carbon composite material, carbon-ceramic brake system, e-gear six-speed transmission with, tricolore decals on the sides. It was available in 4 body colors (Giallo Midas (yellow), Bianco Monocerus (white), Grigio Thalasso (grey) and Rosso Mars (red)), matte black rear wing with contrasts in body color, hood, front air intakes, rear diffuser and 19-inch forged wheels in high-gloss black; choice of three brake caliper colors (red, black, yellow), carbon fiber (at door panels, racing seats and center console cover, handbrake frame, the middle of the center console, the lower rim of the steering wheel, the trim around the main and secondary instrument panels, the door handles, the handle for opening the glove box) and Alcantara (at the underside of the dashboard, central panel of the seat cushion and the backrest) interior upholstery, bucket seats (optional comfort seats). The rear wing was reported to produce three times more downforce than the standard Gallardo's electronically adjusted spoiler.

The US model was offered in Giallo Midas color only. Deliveries of the vehicle began in September 2013.

=== Lamborghini Gallardo LP 560-4 Macau GP (2013) ===
The Gallardo LP 560-4 Macau GP is a limited (3 units) version of the Gallardo LP 560-4 Coupé for the Taiwan market, commemorating Hanss Lin (#38) of the Taiwan-based Gama Racing Team taking 2nd place in the Macau race of the 2013 Lamborghini Super Trofeo Asia series. Changes include the Gallardo Super Trofeo parts (front/rear bumpers, adjustable rear wing, and diffuser, front skirt, detachable carbon fiber engine cover), orange body color, hexagon '63' decal and Tricolore stripes throughout the whole vehicle.

The vehicle was unveiled at the Lamborghini Taipei event between 26 December 2013 and 30 December 2013 and went on sale for $16 million NTD.

==== Motorsports ====
The Gallardo Super Trofeo was used in the 2012 Race of Champions.

== Special and limited editions ==
=== Police cars ===
==== Lamborghini Gallardo 2003 coupé Polizia (2004) ====
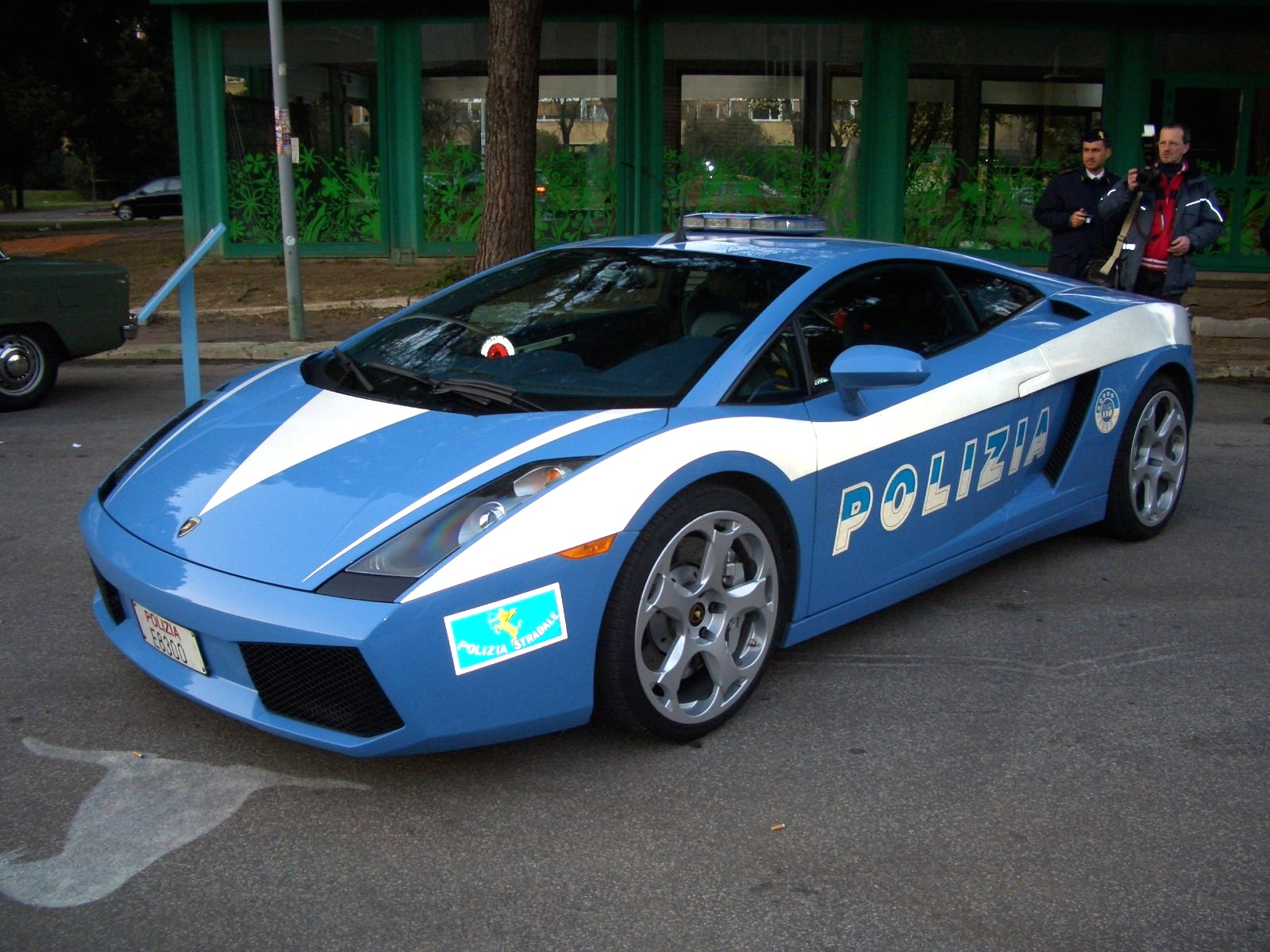
Italian State Police Gallardo

In December 2004, two Gallardos were donated to the Italian Polizia di Stato in honor of the force's 152nd anniversary. One car was donated by Automobili Lamborghini S.p.A. while a second one was donated by an independent organization.

The Gallardo police cars were used by the traffic police (Polizia Stradale) during emergencies and alarm situations on the Salerno-Reggio Calabria highway, also under the powers of the special safety operative which is already being employed along that tract of the highway and, above all, for the transport of body organs destined for transplantation.

However, both of the cars were destroyed in the course of duty. When the Huracán, Gallardo's successor, was introduced, Lamborghini S.p.A. produced a personalized version for the Italian police force to replace the destroyed cars.

==== Lamborghini Gallardo LP 560-4 Polizia (2008) ====
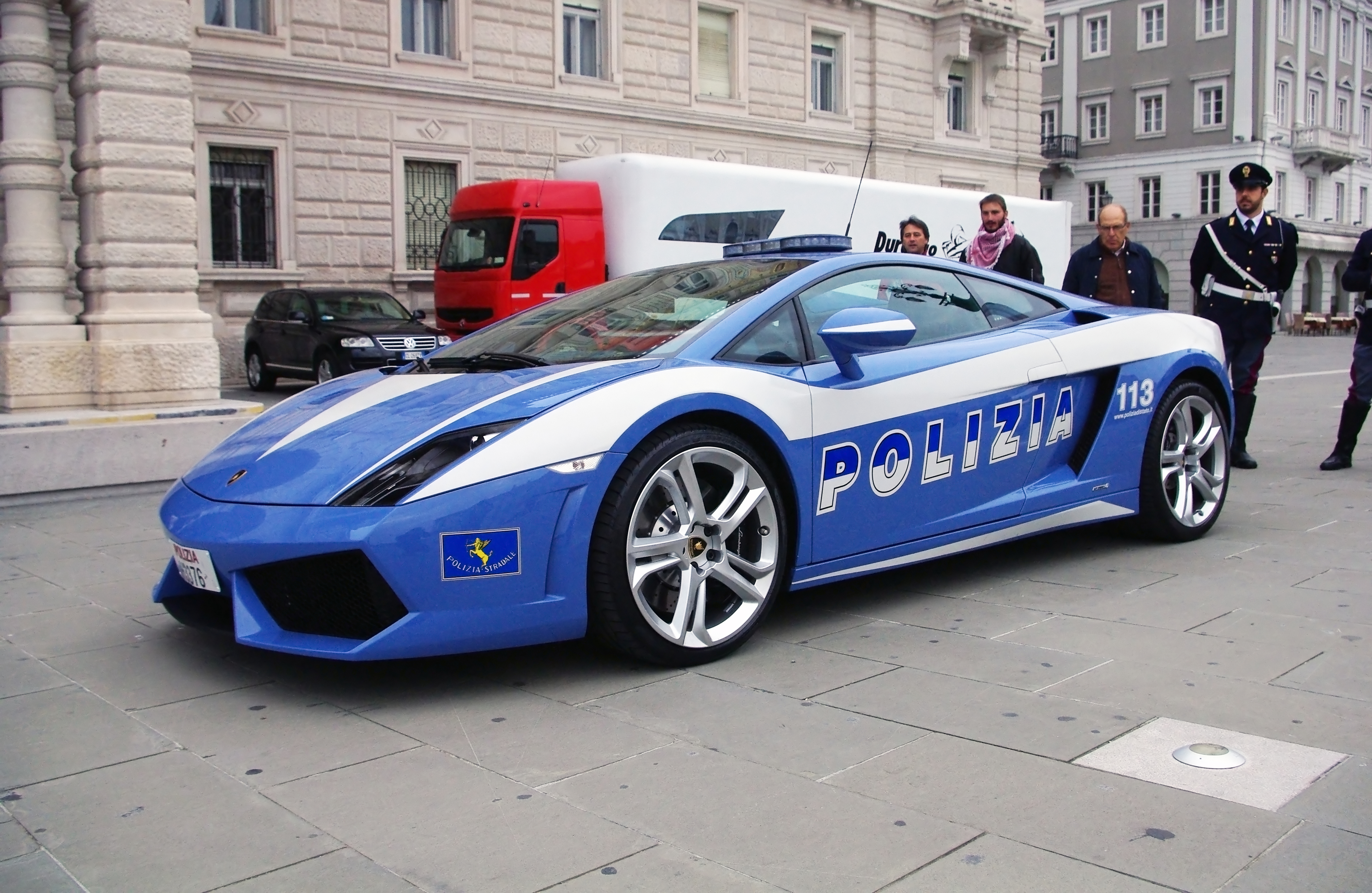
Gallardo LP 560-4 Polizia

The Gallardo LP 560-4 Polizia is a police car version of the Gallardo LP 560-4 coupé for the Italian State Police. It features a camera recording system featuring a camera beside the rearview mirror, GPS navigation, a gun holster, a police radio, a Paletta warning sign, a portable screen, a refrigerator and defibrillator in the front cargo compartment, blue Polizia body color, a police beacon with blue LEDs at the vehicle's front, roof, side, and rear.

==== Lamborghini Gallardo coupé 2003 edition Metropolitan police Edition (2005) ====
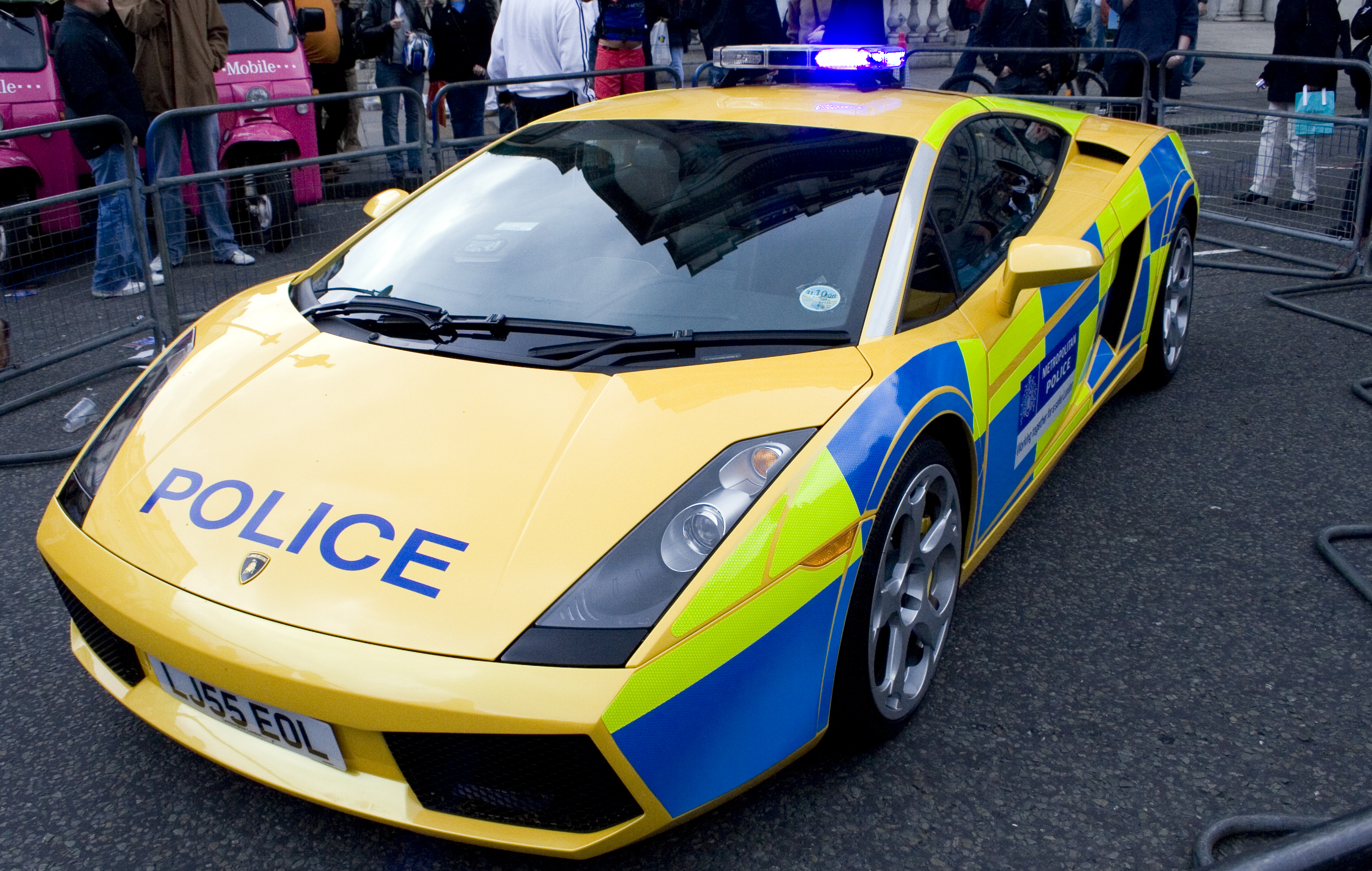
London's Metropolitan Police Gallardo

Two Gallardos have temporarily been used as police cars by the Metropolitan Police in London, one in 2005 and one in 2006, for specific publicity events. The car used in 2006 was seen at the start of the 2006 Gumball Rally. Both vehicles were lent by Lamborghini London and were fitted with yellow and blue battenburg markings, police logos, and a small blue lightbar.

==== Lamborghini Gallardo Coupé Panama police car (2011) ====
It was a version of the Lamborghini Gallardo LP 560-4 for Panama's National Police, seized from David Murcia Guzman of DMG Group Holding, S.A.

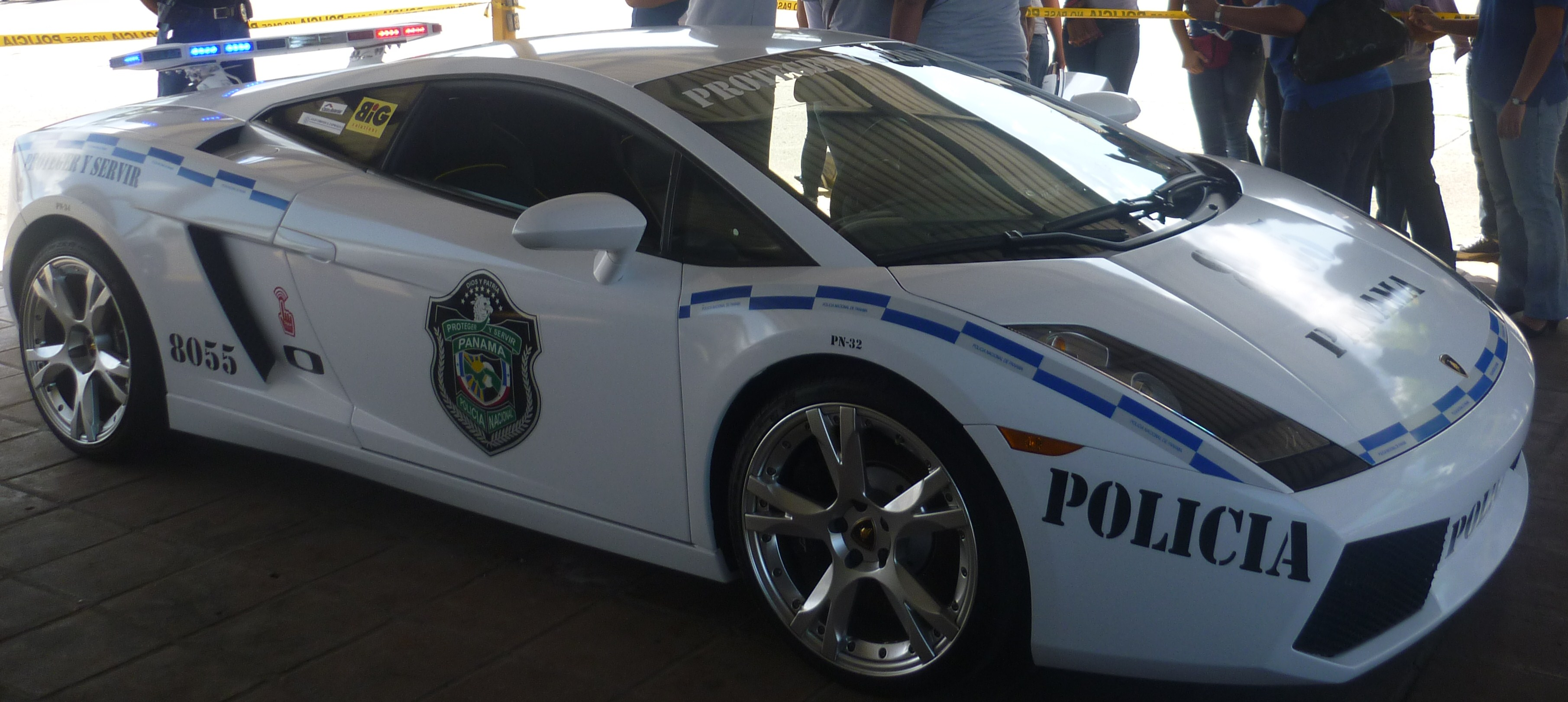
Gallardo used by the Panamanian Public Forces-Police of Panamá

=== Lamborghini Gallardo SE (2005) ===
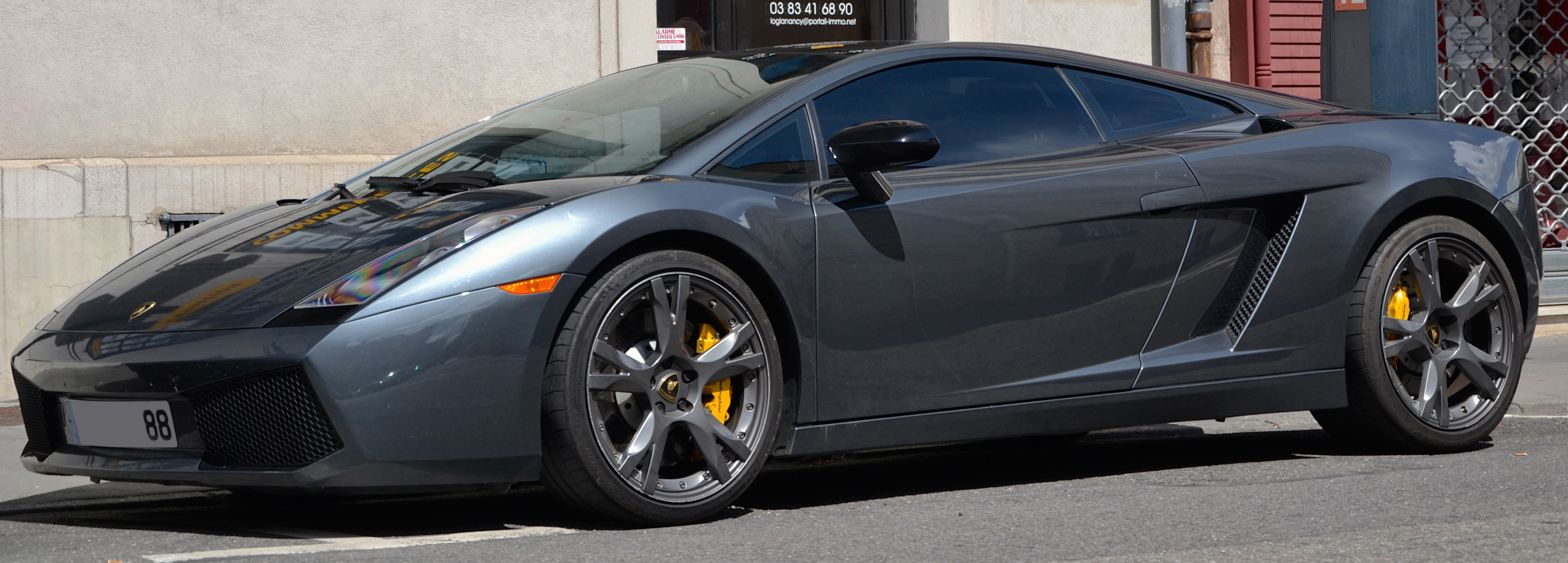
Gallardo SE front view

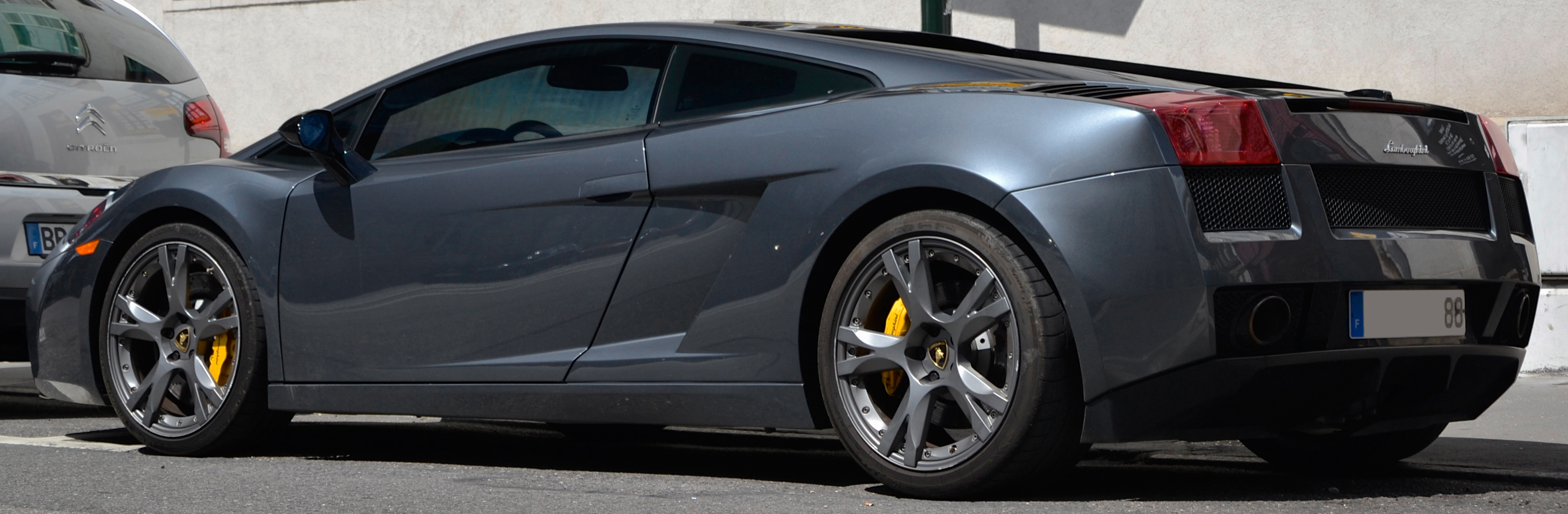
Gallardo SE rear view

The Gallardo SE is a limited edition of 250 units introduced in 2005. It is distinguished from the regular Gallardo externally by a black-roofed two-tone color scheme as well as specially designed "Callisto" wheels. It also featured a two-tone interior further distinguishing it from the base model. All piping and stitching on the leather are executed in the same color as the bodywork of the car. The midsections of the seats are finished in color-coded upholstery and even the black floormats have a color-coded border. A rear-view camera was standard on the Gallardo SE, as was the multimedia and navigation system, sports suspension, and an exclusive cover. The optional E-gear transmission came with a new function: 'thrust' mode. This feature automatically revs the car to 5,000 rpm then drops the clutch engaging all four wheels in a controlled burnout to ensure that the car performs maximum acceleration.

=== Lamborghini Gallardo Italia (2006) ===
In 2006, the Lamborghini Italia was unveiled to mark Italy's victory in the 2006 FIFA World Cup, called Italia with a light blue livery and the Italian tricolor on the roof and a special Alcantara blue interior while the engine heads are gold in color. The mechanics and engine have not been touched. The car is unique, prepared as part of the Ad Personam program, only one with this celebratory livery by the official Lamborghini dealer in Padua. The model was valued €230,000.

=== Lamborghini Gallardo Nera (2007) ===
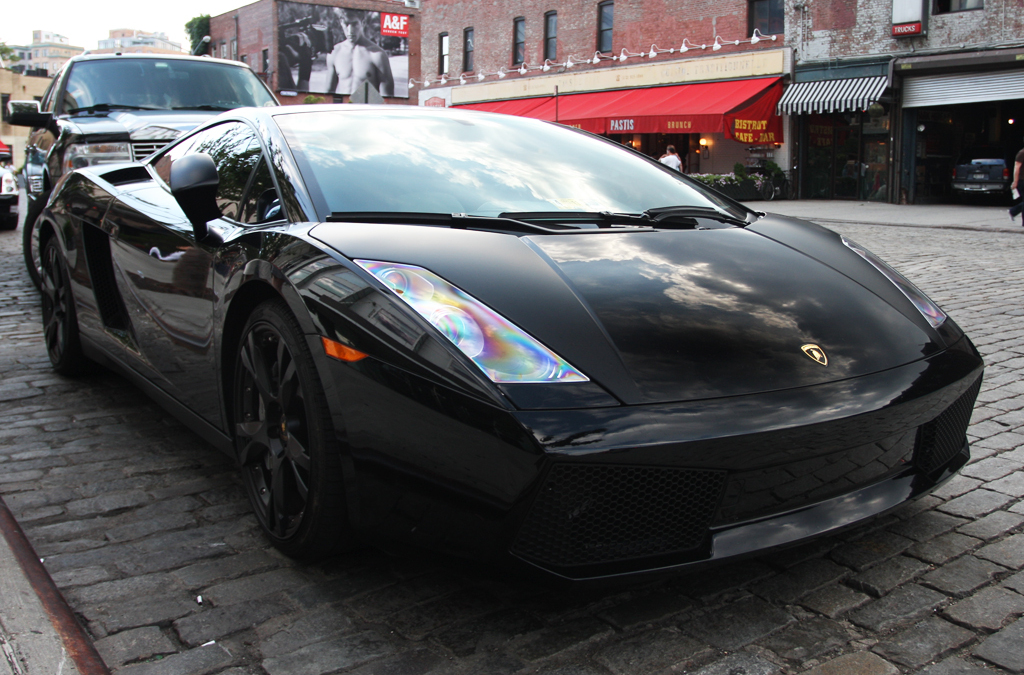
Gallardo Nera

The Gallardo Nera is a special edition (limited to 185 units) of the Gallardo and was introduced at the Paris Motor Show. The car was designed to showcase the customization options available to the customer in the Ad Personam program. It features special matte black body panels and was only available in a special shade of black: a combination of Nero Serapis and Nero Noctis. Brake calipers are painted a special silver and the taillights are smoked to match the darker paint scheme. The interior is stitched from high-contrast black and white leather in the Q-Citura (lozenge-shaped) fashion.

=== Lamborghini Gallardo LP 550-2 Valentino Balboni (2009) ===
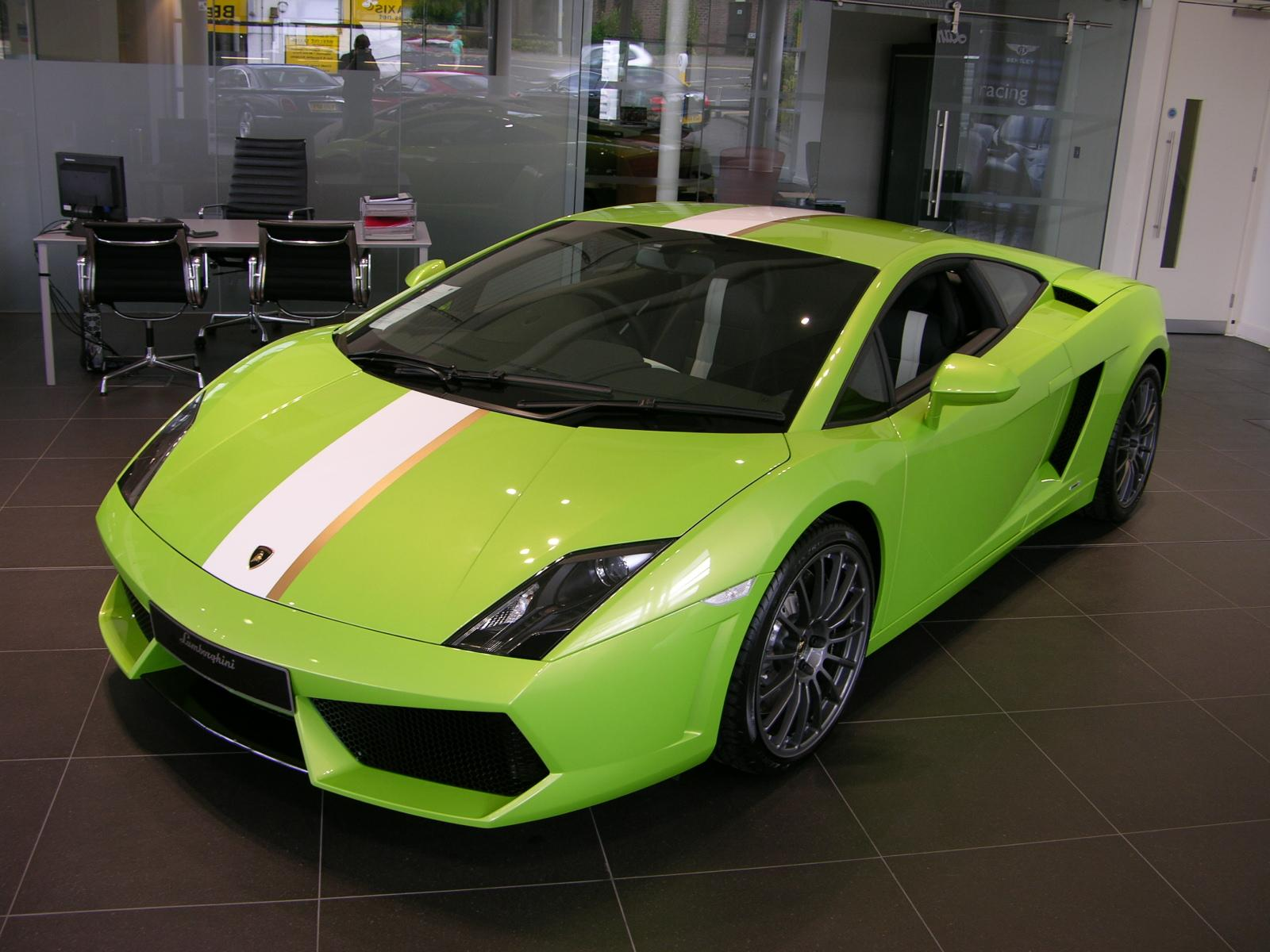
Gallardo LP 550-2 Valentino Balboni

Limited to 250 units, the Gallardo LP 550-2 Valentino Balboni was named after Lamborghini test driver Valentino Balboni and to his request, unlike the contemporary line-up, the Balboni is rear wheel drive, reducing the curb weight by 30 kg (66 lb) to 1,470 kg (3,241 lb). The engine is rated at 550 PS (405 kW; 542 hp). Other features include re-calibrated optional E-gear transmission, redeveloped 45% limited-slip differential, full leather black upholstery with white color strips, Polar white center console, a stripe down the center of the car, and a badge below the left side window bears the signature of Valentino Balboni and the production number of the car. On right-hand drive cars, the badge is located at the bottom of the right-hand-drive rear window. A special one-off Balboni was created by the Singapore distributor of Lamborghini (Eurosport) which had Superleggera seats and a full Reiter Engineering Super Trofeo Strada body derived directly from the Super Trofeo series cars. This one-off Balboni was viewed as the predecessor to the Singapore Edition limited run LP 550-2 (see below) which had a stripped out Superleggera interior, Superleggera side skirts, rear deck, rear diffuser and front bumper (sans Superleggera rear wing) but which critically was a 2wd car which catered to the enthusiast driver. This special Balboni was exported from Singapore to Indonesia in 2015. Lamborghini claims the LP 550-2 Valentino Balboni can reach a top speed of 320 km/h (199 mph) and reach 100 km/h (62 mph) in 3.9 seconds.

=== Lamborghini Gallardo LP 560-4 Gold Edition (2012) ===
The Gallardo LP 560-4 Gold Edition (金色限量版) is a limited (10 units) version of the Gallardo LP 560-4 for the Chinese market. It features a gold body color, black engine cover frame, LED headlamps, Cordelia glossy wheels, red brake calipers, black interior, red stitching and embroidery on the steering wheel and headrest.

The vehicle was unveiled at the 2012 Shenzhen-Hong Kong-Macau International Auto Show, and was sold for 3.988 million yuan (US$810,000).

=== Lamborghini Gallardo Bicolore (2010–2012) ===
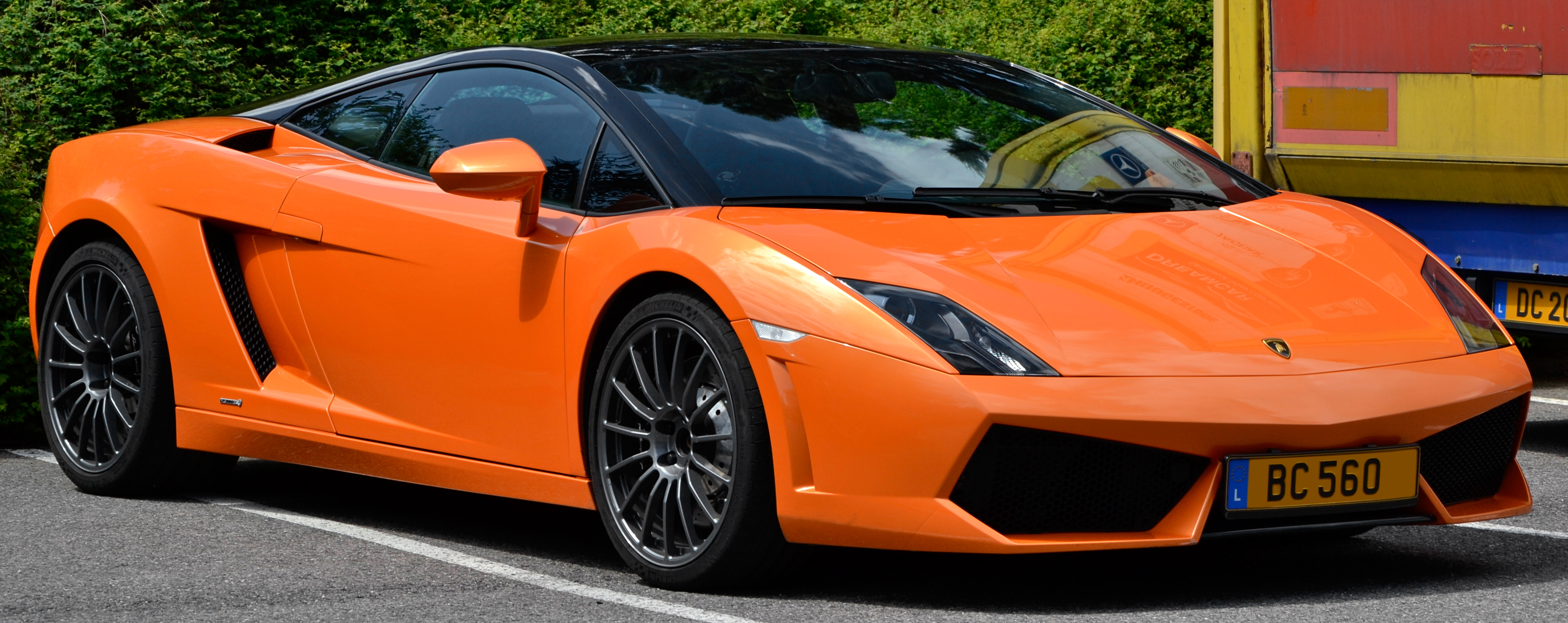
Gallardo Bicolore

The Bicolore is a special edition of the Gallardo, available in both LP 560-4 and LP 550-2 trims. Released in 2010, it features a unique two-tone paint job. The car was available only in orange, yellow, grey, white or blue with a black roof with unique Skorplus alloy wheels.

The Taiwan model of the LP 560-4 Bicolore went on sale on 10 March 2011.

=== Lamborghini Gallardo LP 550-2 Super Trofeo (2010–2013) ===
The LP 550-2 Super Trofeo is a version of the LP 550-2 Valentino Balboni for the Hong Kong market. It does not include the center stripe of the original car. It includes an e-Gear transmission, Super Trofeo body kit (tail wing, front and tail diffuser, side skirts), front and side airbags, TFT screen with USB/iPod connection, GPS with Bluetooth, and front axle height control.

=== Lamborghini Gallardo LP 570-4 Super Trofeo Asia (2013) ===
The Gallardo LP 570-4 Super Trofeo Asia (亞洲限量版) is a limited (3 units, 1 in Taiwan, 2 in Thailand) version of the 2013 LP 570-4 Super Trofeo for the Asian market. It includes a matte black carbon fiber rear wing and engine cover; yellow body color; high gloss carbon fiber door sills, rear diffuser, and side mirror housings; red ceramic carbon-fiber brake calipers; Alcantara interior upholstery; 'Super Trofeo Asia' plaque on the left rear window frame interior border with the serial number and red stitching; and carbon fiber trim on the door panels, racing seats, and center console.

=== Lamborghini Gallardo LP 570-4 Superleggera Nero Nemesis (2010–2013) ===
The LP 570-4 Superleggera Nero Nemesis (消光黑色特別版) is a version of the LP 570-4 Superleggera for the Taiwan market, with matte black body color, matte black interior upholstery, silver interior stitching, and 4-point seat belt.

The vehicle was available for sale from 2010 to 2013.

=== Lamborghini Gallardo LP 560-2 50° Anniversario (2013) ===
The Gallardo LP 560-2 50° Anniversario is a version of the Gallardo LP 550-2 Coupé with increased engine power to 560 PS (412 kW; 552 hp), clear carbon fiber rear wing from the original Gallardo Superleggera, transparent engine cover, dark grey Scorpius wheels and a Bianco Opalis (white metallic) body color.

The vehicle was unveiled at the 2013 Shanghai Motor Show, followed by The 2013 Quail Motorsport Gathering.

=== Lamborghini Gallardo LP 570-4 Superleggera Bianco Canopus Limited Edition (2011–2013) ===
The LP 570-4 Superleggera Bianco Canopus Limited Edition (中華民國建國百年特仕車) is a version of the LP 570-4 Superleggera for the Taiwan market, commemorating the 100th anniversary of the Republic of China. It includes matte white body color, e-gear transmission, silver interior stitching, and 4-point seat belts.

The vehicle went on sale during the 100th year of the Republic of China, with pre-order which began in February 2011.

=== Lamborghini Gallardo LP 550-2 Tricolore (2011–2012) ===
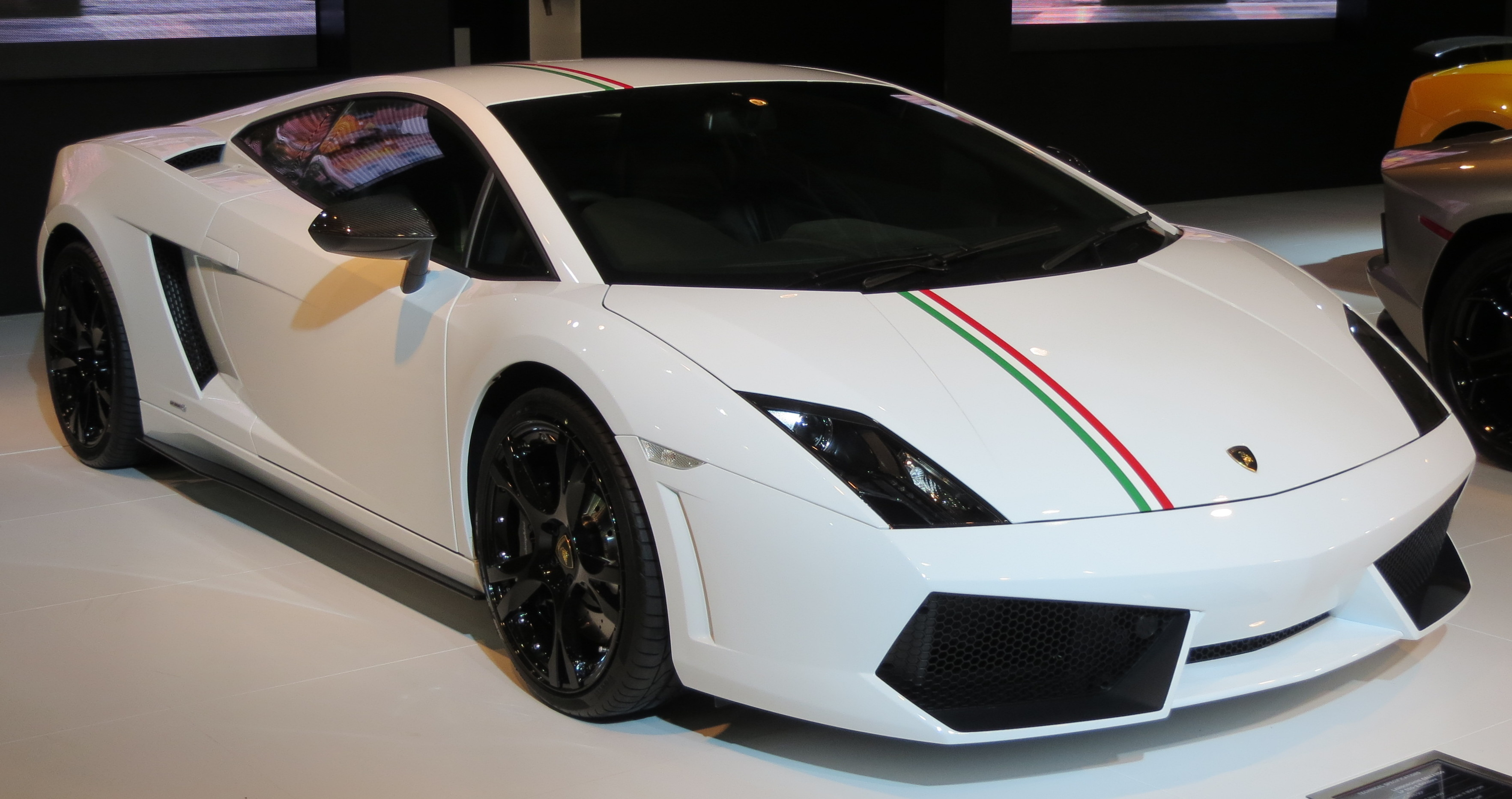
Gallardo LP 550-2 Tricolore front view

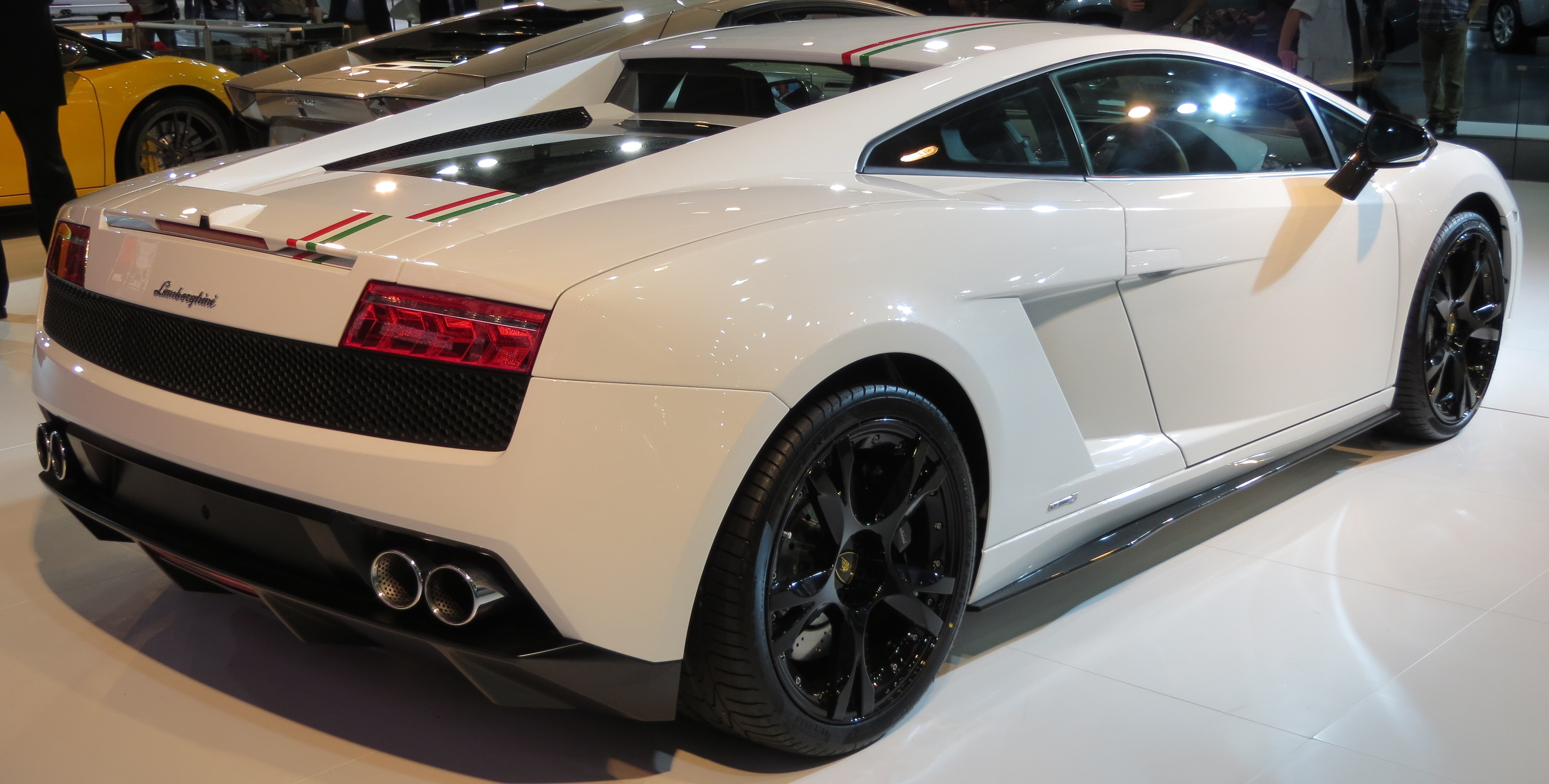
Gallardo LP 550-2 Tricolore rear view

The LP 550-2 Tricolore is a version of the Gallardo LP 550-2 for the Europe, Middle East, and Asian Pacific markets, commemorating the 150th anniversary of Italian unification. Only 150 units of the Gallardo Tricolore were produced. Each car featured unique styling elements such as green, white, and red stripes (representing the flag of Italy) from the cargo bay to engine cover; white body color, carbon fiber rearview mirror and side skirts are taken from the Gallardo LP 570-4 Superleggera, matte black front air intake grille from the Gallardo LP 570-4 Superleggera, black interior, green, white, red stripes at left seat aligned to the exterior tricolor stripes; 'Tricolore' embroidering at the driver seat, e-gear panel and steering wheel in carbon fiber, Alcantara upholstery at the center console and door trim, Nero Perseus black leather upholstery, 'Tricolore' plaque at door sill, seat side and inner window frame.

The vehicle was unveiled at the 2011 Turin Auto Show.

Taiwan models of the LP 550-2 Tricolore went on sale on 2 June 2011.

=== Lamborghini Gallardo LP 570-4 Super Trofeo Stradale ===
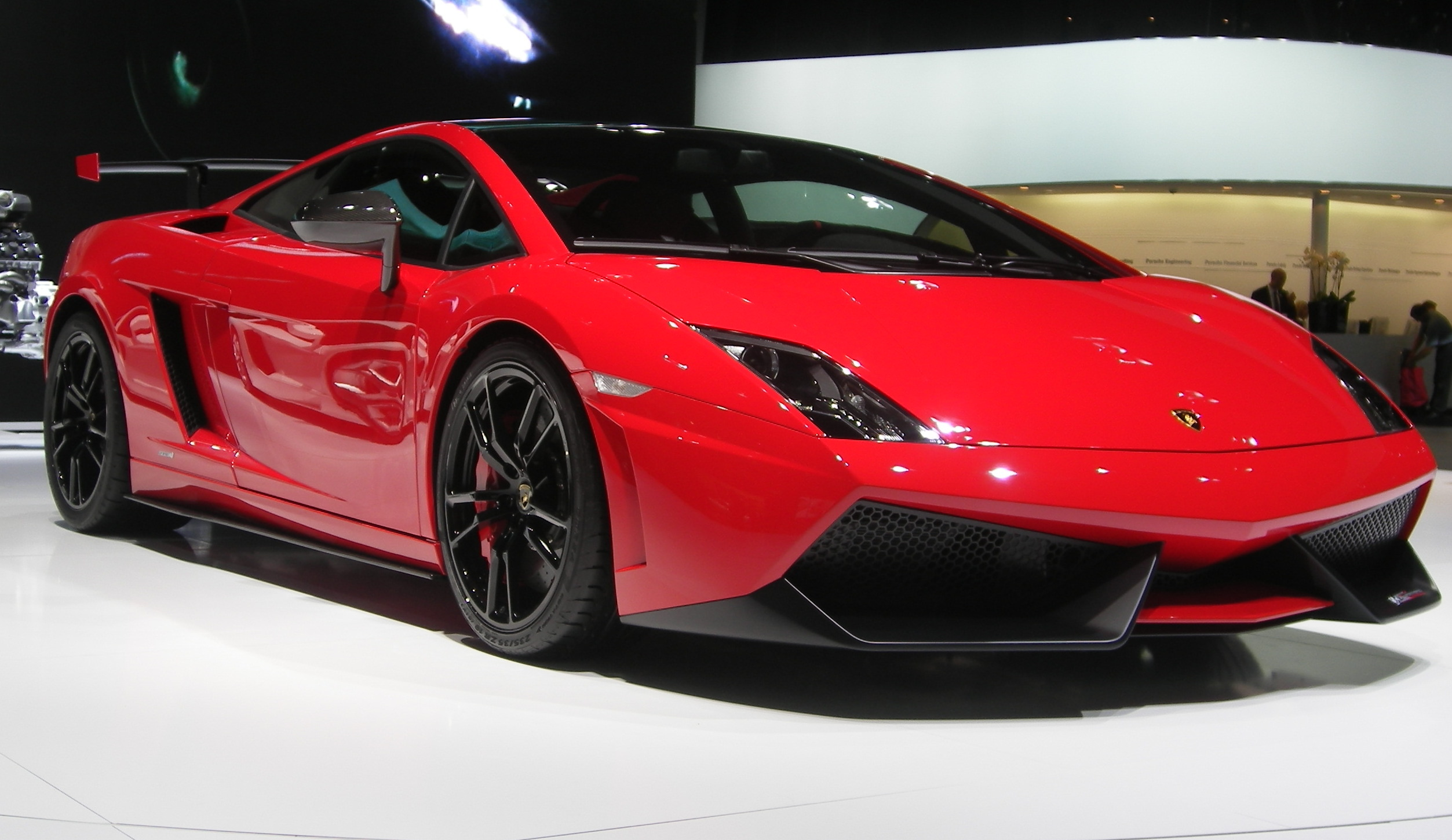
2013 Gallardo Super Trofeo Stradale front view

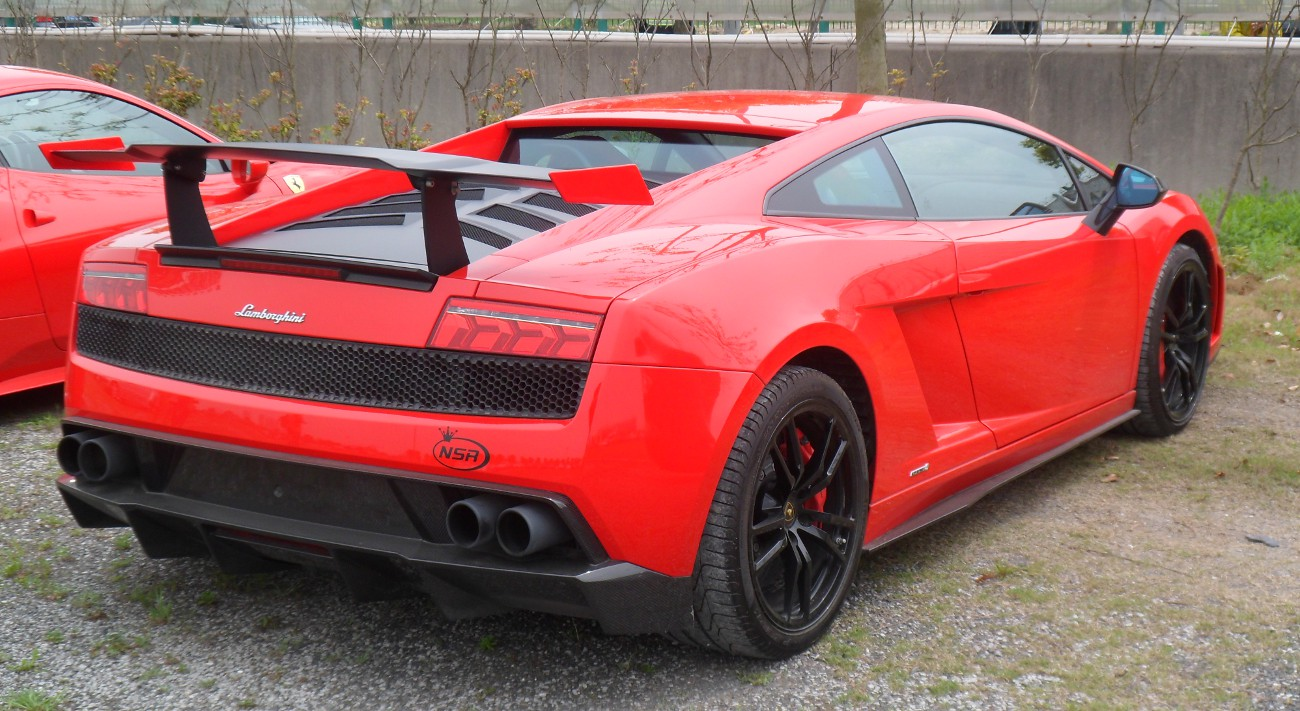
Gallardo Super Trofeo Stradale rear view

Presented at the 2011 Frankfurt Motor Show, the Super Trofeo Stradale was a limited (150 units) version of the LP 570-4 Superleggera. Boasting a dry weight of 1,340 kg (2,954 lb), it is 70 kg (154 lb) lighter than a comparably equipped LP 560-4. Essentially a road version of the Super Trofeo race car, equipped with the same adjustable rear spoiler that offers an aerodynamic load 3 times that of the standard Gallardo LP 560-4 for increased dynamic stability during tight, high-speed driving. Another element taken directly from the racing version was the removable engine hood with a quick-release system. The vehicle includes Rosso Mars (red) body-color, 6-speed "E-gear" automated manual transmission, carbon fiber and Alcantara interior upholstery with red stitching, double-A-arm suspension, 19-inch wheels, titanium bearing and bolts, Pirelli P Zero Corsa tires. Optional equipment includes carbon-ceramic brake discs, a tubular interior roll cage, 4-point safety belts, and fire extinguisher, satellite navigation, with Bluetooth connection for mobile phones, an anti-theft system, grey or white brake calipers and a lifting system that raises the front axle.

The Taiwan model was sold in limited quantities (3 units), with both road and track versions. The road version includes exclusive carbon fiber tail wing and engine cover, Alcantara interior upholstery and Alcantara racing seats. The track version includes a racing type roll cage, red 4-point seat belts, travel package, and a chrome and carbon fiber interior package.

The car won the Targa Tasmania in 2010.

=== Lamborghini Gallardo Singapore Limited Edition (2011) ===
The Singapore Limited Edition was a limited (10 units) version of the Gallardo LP 550–2 in Singapore, celebrating 10 years of Lamborghini's presence in Singapore. Available in black and white primary body color with red side stripes accented by a badge featuring the Merlion, it includes parts taken from the LP 570-4 Superleggera such as the front spoiler, a rear wing, a wheelset and interior trim.

The vehicle went on sale with SGD$20000 from the sale of each car donated to The Straits Times School Pocket Money Fund. Delivery took place at the Mandarin Oriental hotel in Singapore.

=== Lamborghini Gallardo LP 550-2 Hong Kong 20th Anniversary Edition (2012) ===
The LP 550-2 Hong Kong Edition commemorates the 20th anniversary of Lamborghini cars being sold in Hong Kong. Modifications on the model include custom paint with a coat of Bianco Monocerus, a white color, matte gold stripes that run the length of the hood, over the roof, and down the rear. Matte black accents round out the paintwork with a matte black rear bumper and spoiler, side skirts, and spoiler, with HK20 graphics on the front spoiler, rear fascia, and side sills. These extend to the interior on the headrests and center console. Only 8 will be produced with pricing at $3,680,000 each.

=== Lamborghini Gallardo Malaysia Limited Edition (2012) ===
The Gallardo Malaysia Limited Edition is a limited edition (20 units) version of the Gallardo LP 550-2 for the Malaysian market. Available in Bianco Monocerus (solid white), Verde Ithaca (pearl green) and Arancio Borealis (pearl orange) body color, it includes the body kit from the LP 570-4 Superleggera (front bumper, carbon side skirts, 4 titanium exhaust tips, and a carbon fiber rear diffuser), a different interior with Alcantara and leather with bespoke stitching and a 6-speed E-gear transmission.

The vehicle was unveiled at Eminent Century Sdn Bhd, the official Malaysian importer of Lamborghini cars, and JH Italia Sdn Bhd, the sole dealer, in Kuala Lumpur. The vehicle went on sale for RM868,000 before duties, road tax and insurance (RM 1,680,000 excluding insurance).

=== Lamborghini Gallardo India Serie Speciale Edition (2013) ===
To mark its 50th anniversary, Lamborghini wanted to provide something special for the Indian market where they had found a good business potential, hence a limited edition of six cars based on the best selling variant of the Gallardo, the LP 550-2 was created. Two cars were produced in Arancio Borealis (pearl orange), two in Bianco Isis (pearl white), and two in Verde Ithaca (pearl green), representing the colors of the Indian Flag. All cars featured the Indian flag tricolor stripes running the entire length of the car and engine intake manifold cover in the same color. To suit Indian road conditions, the car features a lift suspension. With the push of a button, the ground clearance increases by 40 mm (1.6 in) taking it to 165 mm (6.5 in).

=== Lamborghini Gallardo Indonesia Limited Edition (2013) ===
The Gallardo LP 550-2 Indonesia Limited Edition is based on the LP 550-2 model but features a Superleggera style body and a bright green Verde Ithaca body color. It was limited to the Indonesian Market only and available in January 2013. The 2013 Gallardo LP 550-2 Indonesia Limited Edition received several items from the option list as standard equipment, the most eye-catching naturally being the Superleggera bumpers and side skirts, a glass engine cover with the optional LED lights installed which gave an even better view of the V10 engine at night and available with E-Gear transmission. The wheels are the regular dual five-spoke Apollo wheels seen on the Gallardo LP 560-4 model, but finished in glossy black for the Indonesian edition.

=== Lamborghini Gallardo LP 560-4 Noctis (2012–2013) ===
The LP 560-4 Noctis is a version of the Gallardo LP 560–4 with two-tone color schemes, for Hong Kong and Chinese markets. Available in dark grey/silver and dark blue/silver body color, 6-speed E-gear transmission, 19-inch alloy wheels, black leather, and grey Alcantara upholstery, adjustable suspension.

The vehicle was unveiled at the Auto Guangzhou 2011, and later the 2012 Auto Qingdao. The Chinese version was sold for 3,980,000 yuan.

=== Lamborghini Gallardo LP 560-4 Bianco Rosso (2012) ===
The Gallardo LP 560-4 Bianco Rosso (ガヤルド LP 560-4 ビアンコ・ロッソ) is a limited (10 units) version of the Gallardo LP 560-4 coupé for the Japanese market, commemorating 45 years of importing Lamborghini to Japan and 10 years of Lamborghini Japan, inspired by Japan's flag. Designed by Lamborghini Design Centre, it includes red side mirror cover, red engine cover frame, red brake caliper, black interior, red leather upholstery at side holder, door handle, hand brake; rearview camera, LED headlight package, 19-inch high gloss black Cordelia wheels, car navigation system, lifting system.

The vehicle went on sale on 18 May 2012 for 25.41 million yen ($320,100 US).

== Concept cars ==
=== Lamborghini Concept S ===
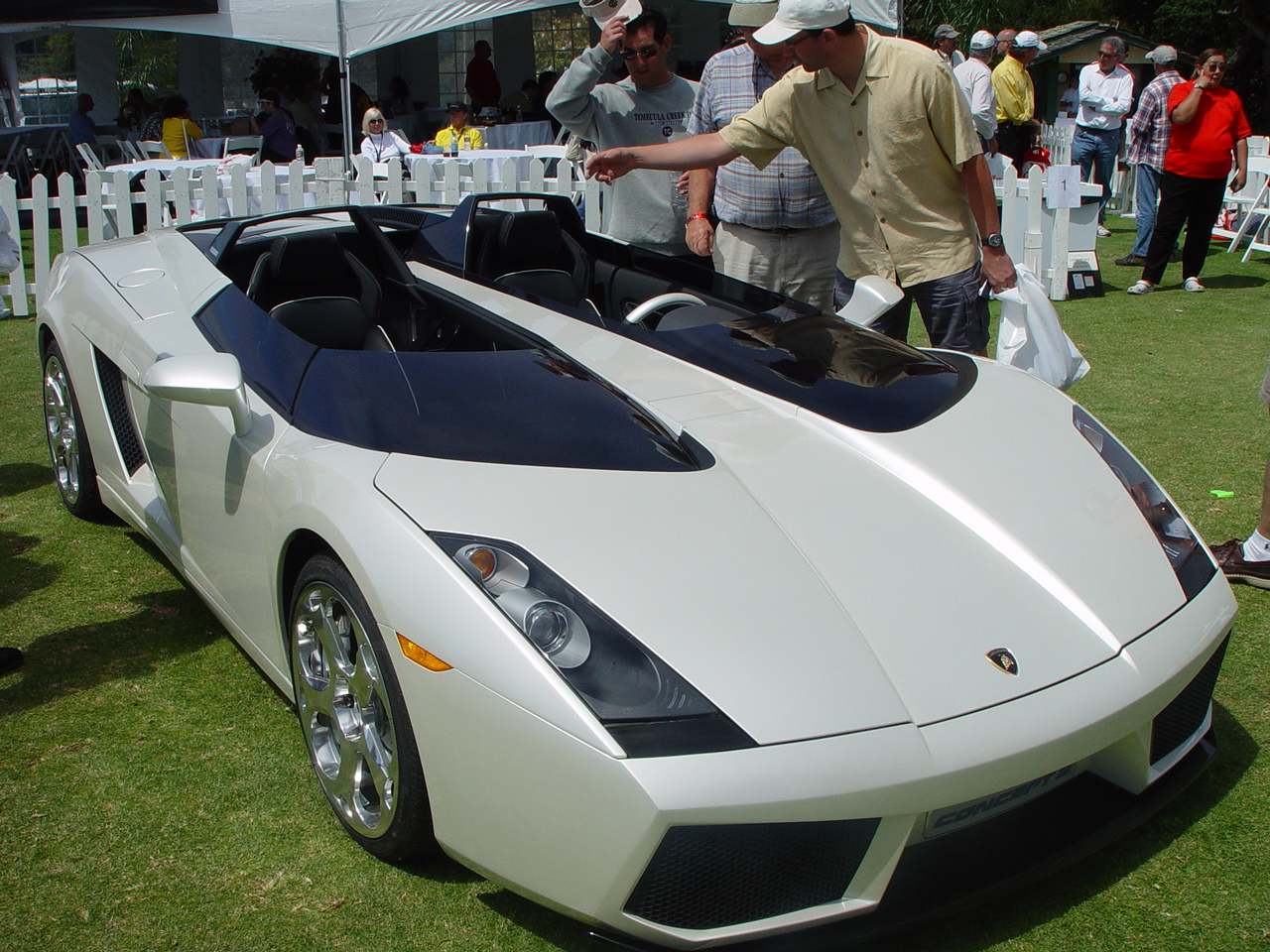
Lamborghini Concept S front view

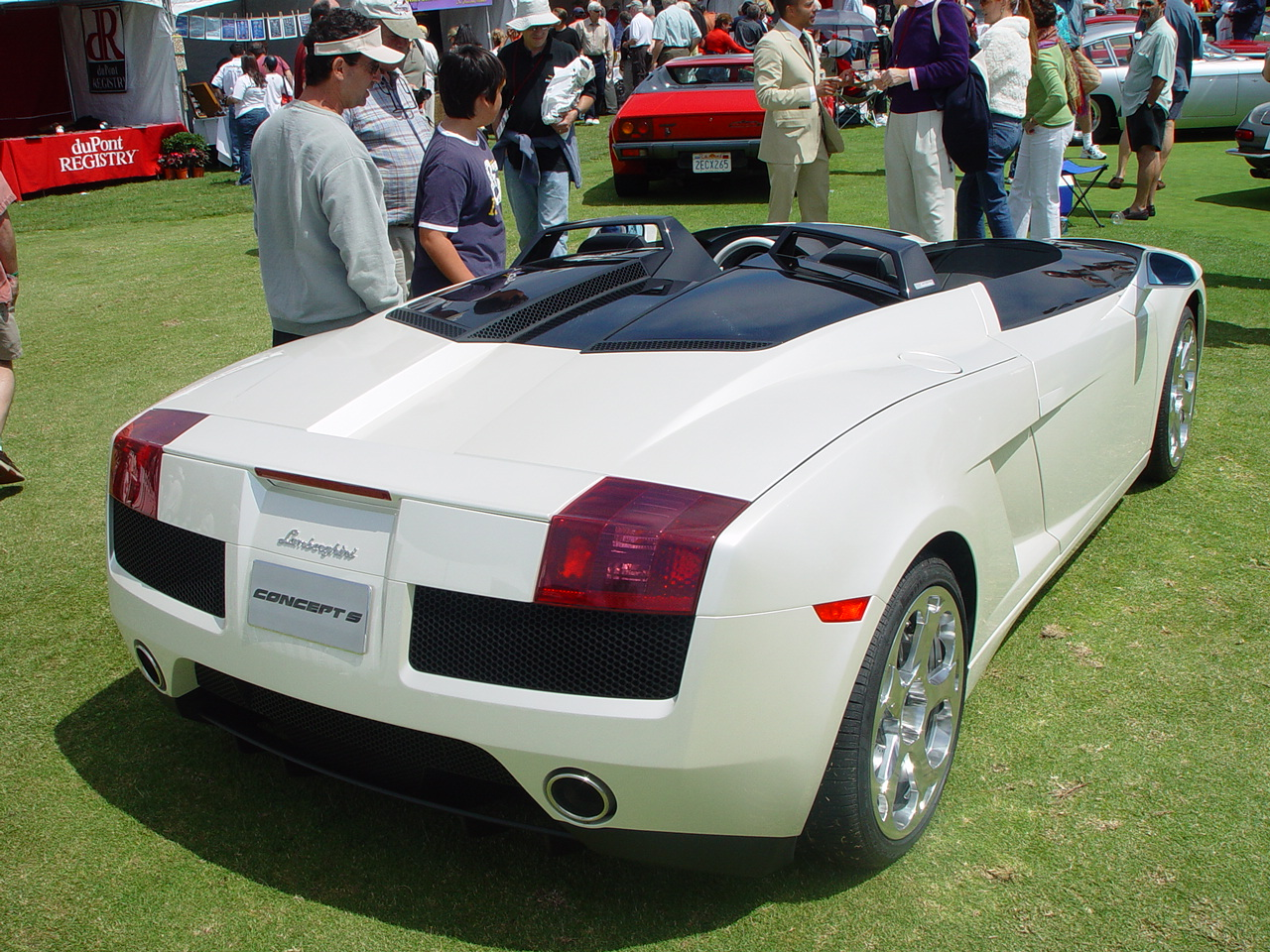
Lamborghini Concept S rear view

The Lamborghini Concept S is a concept car based on the Gallardo, featuring a speedster (Barchetta) body designed by Luc Donckerwolke. It was built in 2005 and was first shown at that year's Geneva Motor Show. The Concept S was intended to be a modern interpretation of the single-seat roadsters of the past. Utilizing a 'saute-vent' (French for 'change wind') instead of a traditional windscreen, and dividing the interior into two distinct compartments by continuing the bodywork between the seats, which also serves as an air inlet feeding the mid-mounted 5.0 L V10 engine, giving the car a distinctly futuristic look along with increasing aerodynamic flow. The rear-view mirror is even electronically retractable to allow the driver to see behind, when necessary, or to retract it into the dashboard when not needed. Though considered more of a styling exercise than a working production vehicle, the final working show car only had to be modified slightly from the original computer-aided designs. Lamborghini was rumored to be building 100 examples for customers but decided to keep it as a styling exercise. Only 2 cars were produced: the high-window prototype sits in the Lamborghini museum with no engine, while the running low-window prototype featured at Pebble Beach was up for auction on 10 December 2015 at RM Sotheby's Manhattan event "Driven by Disruption". It was expected to sell for US$2.4 to 3 million, but failed to sell. In 2023 one of the two prototypes arrived in a Miami car dealer named CURATED.

== Production ==
Year	Units	Coupé	Spyder
2003	933	933	–
2004	1,294	1,294	–
2005	972	947	25
2006	1,651	626	1,025
2007	1,951	936	1,015
2008	1,787	1,206	581
2009	922	462	460
2010	1,064	817	247
2011	1,264	944	320
2012	1,221 (1,161 deliveries)	822	399
2013	933 (1,120 deliveries)	653	280
Total	14,022	9,640	4,352

=== End of production ===
The last Lamborghini vehicle with a manual transmission was reported to be a Lamborghini Gallardo LP 560-2 50° Anniversario by Popular Mechanics.

On 25 November 2013, the last Lamborghini Gallardo, an LP 570-4 Spyder Performante with Rosso Mars (red) body colour, was built at the Sant'Agata Bolognese factory, to be received by a private collector in the upcoming weeks. A total of 14,022 units of the Lamborghini Gallardo had been built during its 10-year product cycle.

== Motorsports ==
=== FIA GT3 Championship ===
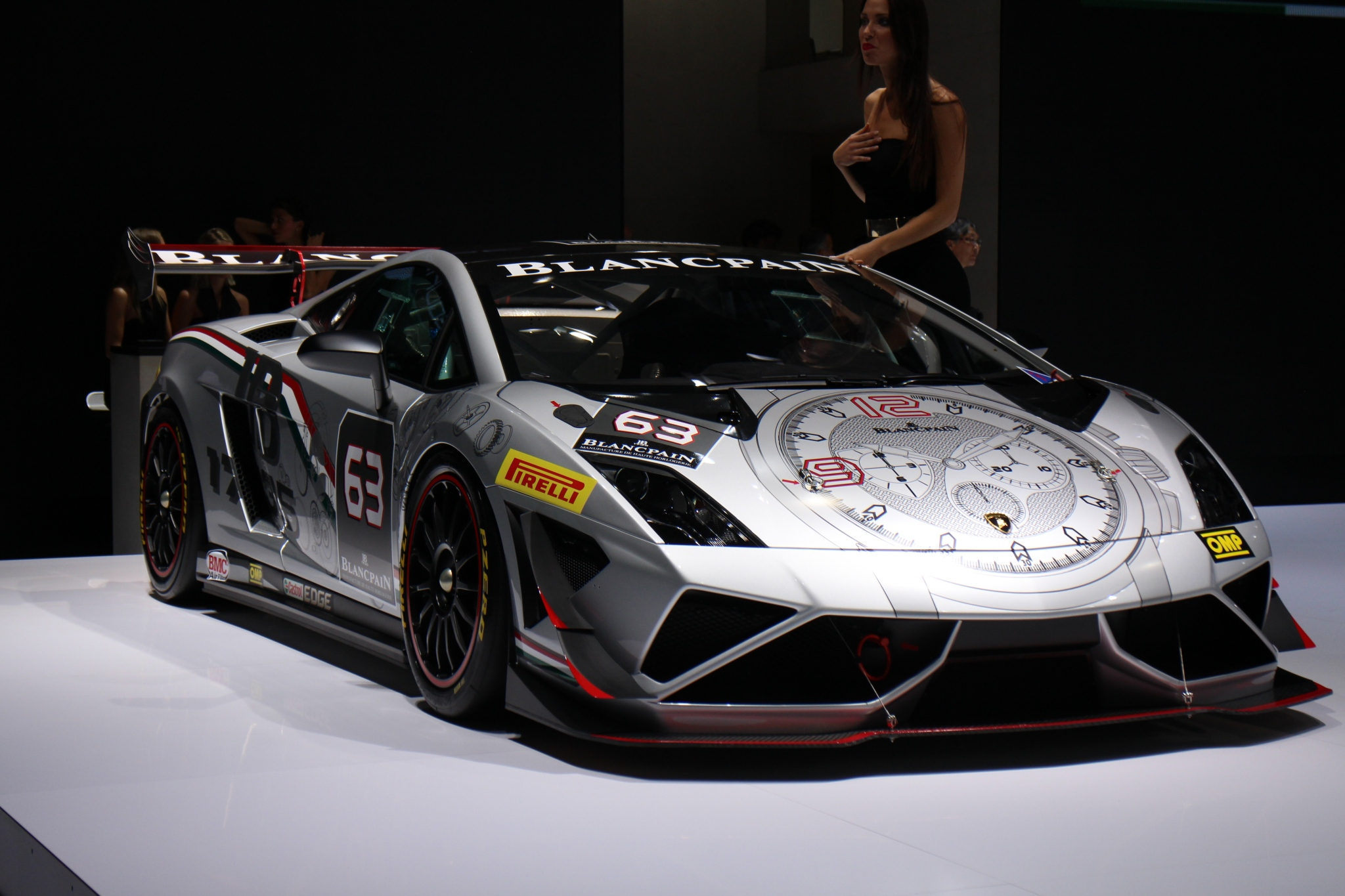
Gallardo GT3

In 2007, the Gallardo was entered in the FIA GT3 Championship, with the Gallardo GT3, built by German motorsport specialists Reiter Engineering, who previously manufactured the Murciélago R-GT and the Diablo GTR Super Trophy race cars. All the extra aerodynamic components were bolt-on parts, conforming with cost-effective regulations that meant the finished car had to closely resemble its road-going counterpart. Brembo racing brakes and OZ Racing wheels were also added. It was converted to rear-wheel drive, other than when racing in the one-make Lamborghini Super Trofeo. The engine generated a maximum power output of 520 PS (382 kW; 513 hp) at 7,800 rpm and 510 N⋅m (376 lb⋅ft) of torque at 4,500 RPM.

=== ADAC GT Masters ===
The inaugural season of ADAC GT Masters was held in 2007 and the championship was won by the Lamborghini Gallardo LP520 GT3 driven by Christopher Haase, Gianni Morbidelli and Jos Menten. The german racing team, Reiter Engineering won the drivers' championship with 214 points, and the team championship with 332 points. They won six of the ten races that season, including the season finale at Hockenheim.

Reiter Engineering would also win the 2010 ADAC GT Masters season with Peter Kox and Albert von Thurn und Taxis. They drove a Lamborghini Gallardo LP560 GT3 for the Reiter Engineering team. The pair won five races and finished on the podium in ten of the fourteen races. They finished with 147 points, 18 points ahead of the second-placed team.

=== Super GT ===
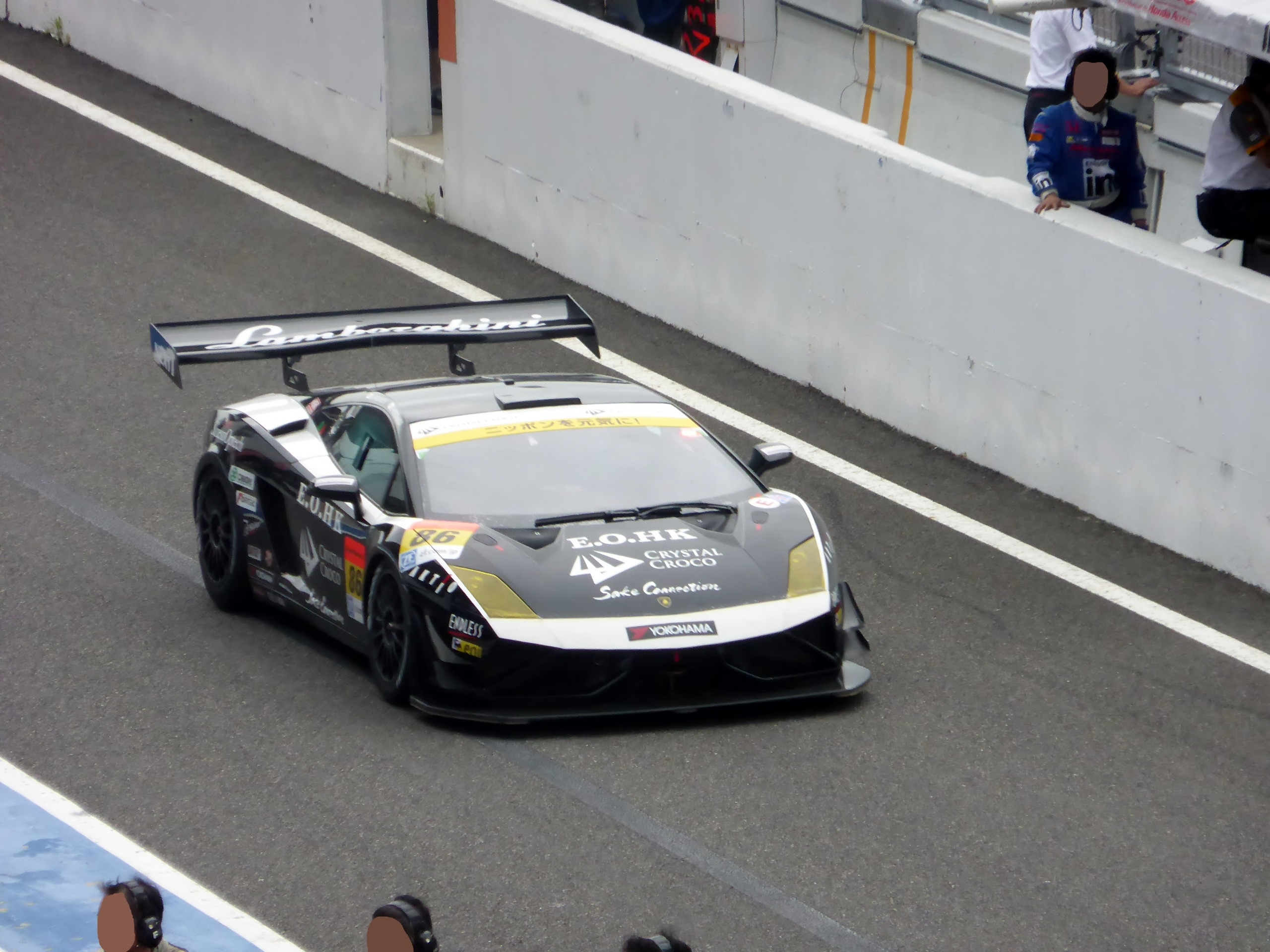
Gallardo Super GT

In 2007, the Gallardo was entered by Japan Lamborghini Owners Club (JLOC) to the GT300 class of the Japanese Super GT Championship, the car had to conform to rather different regulations. The engine could only have a power output of 300 PS (221 kW; 296 hp) and the car must be rear-wheel-drive. The power was limited by air restrictions placed in the engine bay. The gearbox is a sequential 6-Speed twin-clutch setup. The rules regarding aerodynamics are far looser than those in FIA GT, meaning the Super GT car has more advanced aero, including a much bigger rear wing. It took a while to be competitive, only being consistently at the top during the 2009 season.

=== Lamborghini Blancpain Super Trofeo ===
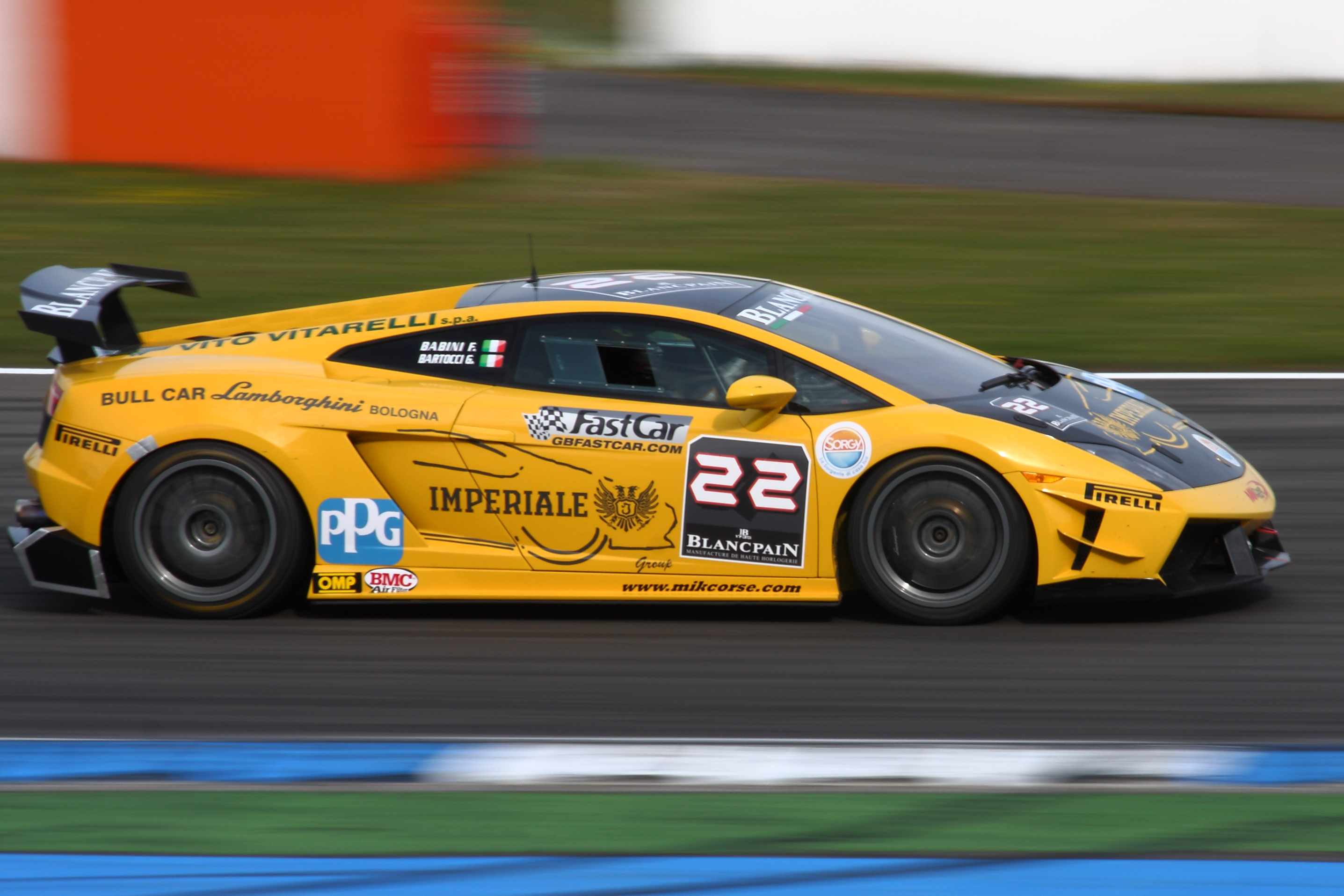
Gallardo LP 560-4 Super Trofeo side view

In May 2009 Lamborghini introduced what it calls the 'Fastest one-make series in the world', featuring the Gallardo LP 560-4 Super Trofeo, a race-prepared version of the newer Gallardo LP 560-4. The series supported European race series such as Deutsche Tourenwagen Meisterschaft (DTM), FIA GT Series and the World Touring Car Championship (WTCC), featuring 18 races overall and having a 30-car grid consisting of privateer teams as well as Lamborghini dealer teams and one factory team featuring guest drivers. The Super Trofeo race car was based on the Gallardo LP 560-4 sports car, but with a reworked chassis, dramatic bodywork/aerodynamics and a direct injection odd firing V10 engine rated at 570 PS (419 kW; 562 hp) with a higher compression ratio of 12.5:1, variable valve timing all prepared by the Reiter Engineering group. The car has dry weight of 1,300 kg (2,866 lb). E-gear transmission was standard. The race car and parts package cost €200,000 (US$284,300) plus tax, available via Lamborghini dealerships, with support and parts sales trackside.

=== Reiter Extenso ===
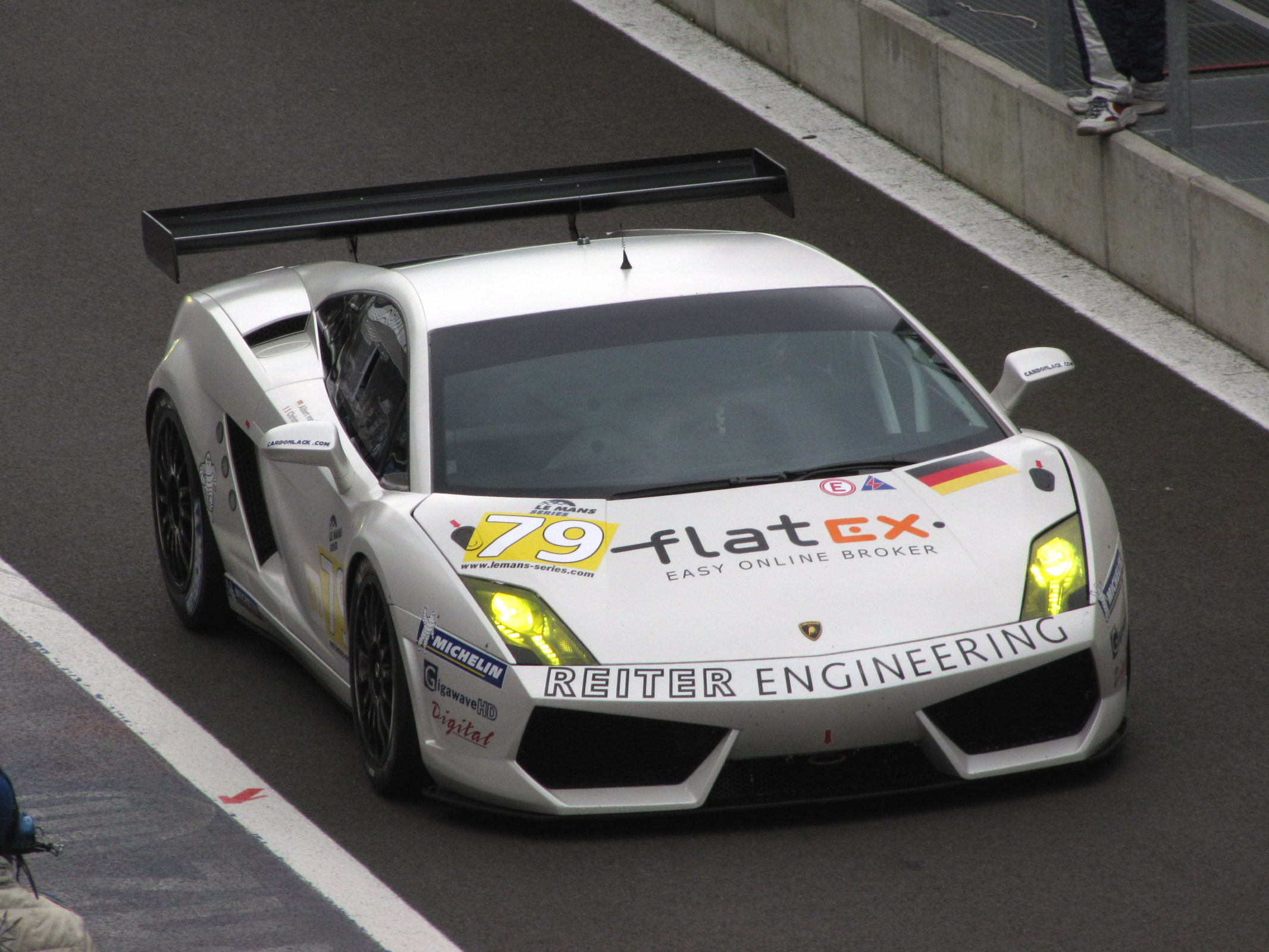
Gallardo Reiter Extenso front view

The final motorsport iteration of the Gallardo was created externally by Lamborghini's long time motorsport partner Reiter Engineering. Introduced in 2014, the Gallardo Reiter Extenso R-EX extended the racing life of the Gallardo beyond the introduction of its successor, the Lamborghini Huracán GT3.

=== American Le Mans Series ===
West Racing campaigned an LP 560 GT in the GT class of the American Le Mans Series for certain races of the 2011 season. However, as of July 2011, the team announced that they were developing a new car and by implication would no longer race the LP 560.

=== Speed World Challenge ===
DP7 Racing has currently entered two Gallardos in the Speed World Challenge GT Series, driven by Dan Pastorini and Chip Herr.

== Gas tank issues ==
The Gallardo features a unique gas port located on the top of the car, and is designed in a way that is incompatible with the anti-vapor sheath that most American gas stations use as a safety feature. This design issue causes gas pumps to fail to engage, or disengage in the middle of the fill process. Lamborghini owners have resorted to using mechanical hacks, such as pulling back the sheath with their fingers, or employing a plastic ring fitted over the port to force the sheath backwards.
