= 2009 ADAC GT Masters =

Motorsport season

Seasons
- ← 2008 2010 →

The 2009 ADAC GT Masters season was the third season of the ADAC GT Masters, the grand tourer-style sports car racing founded by the German automobile club ADAC. It began on 12 April at Motorsport Arena Oschersleben and finished on 18 October at the same place after seven double-header meetings. Christian Abt with help of Shane Williams, Jan Seyffarth and Christopher Mies clinched the championship title.

== Race calendar and results ==
Round		Circuit	Date	Pole	Winner
1	R1	(Germany) Motorsport Arena Oschersleben	12 April	No. 26 Callaway Competition	No. 26 Callaway Competition
1	R1	(Germany) Motorsport Arena Oschersleben	12 April	(Germany) Marc Hennerici (Germany) Luca Ludwig	(Germany) Marc Hennerici (Germany) Luca Ludwig
1	R2	(Germany) Motorsport Arena Oschersleben	13 April	No. 4 Argo Racing	No. 26 Callaway Competition
1	R2	(Germany) Motorsport Arena Oschersleben	13 April	(Germany) Frank Kechele (Poland) Kuba Giermaziak	(Germany) Marc Hennerici (Germany) Luca Ludwig
2	R1	(Netherlands) TT Circuit Assen	9 May	No. 6 Abt Sportsline	No. 6 Abt Sportsline
2	R1	(Netherlands) TT Circuit Assen	9 May	(Germany) Christian Abt (Germany) Jan Seyffarth	(Germany) Christian Abt (Germany) Jan Seyffarth
2	R2	(Netherlands) TT Circuit Assen	10 May	No. 6 Abt Sportsline	No. 6 Abt Sportsline
2	R2	(Netherlands) TT Circuit Assen	10 May	(Germany) Christian Abt (Germany) Jan Seyffarth	(Germany) Christian Abt (Germany) Jan Seyffarth
3	R1	(Germany) Hockenheimring	6 June	No. 16 Team Rosberg	No. 16 Team Rosberg
3	R1	(Germany) Hockenheimring	6 June	(Portugal) César Campaniço (France) Nicolas Armindo	(Portugal) César Campaniço (France) Nicolas Armindo
3	R2	(Germany) Hockenheimring	7 June	No. 6 Abt Sportsline	No. 6 Abt Sportsline
3	R2	(Germany) Hockenheimring	7 June	(Germany) Christian Abt (Germany) Jan Seyffarth	(Germany) Christian Abt (Germany) Jan Seyffarth
4	R1	(Germany) EuroSpeedway Lausitz	4 July	No. 6 Abt Sportsline	No. 12 Phoenix Racing
4	R1	(Germany) EuroSpeedway Lausitz	4 July	(Germany) Christian Abt (Germany) Jan Seyffarth	(Germany) Christopher Haase (Switzerland) Henri Moser
4	R2	(Germany) EuroSpeedway Lausitz	5 July	No. 18 Callaway Competition	No. 18 Callaway Competition
4	R2	(Germany) EuroSpeedway Lausitz	5 July	(Germany) Christian Hohenadel (Switzerland) Toni Seiler	(Germany) Christian Hohenadel (Switzerland) Toni Seiler
5	R1	(Germany) Nürburgring	22 August	No. 33 Alpina	No. 33 Alpina
5	R1	(Germany) Nürburgring	22 August	(Germany) Jens Klingmann (Germany) Andreas Wirth	(Germany) Jens Klingmann (Germany) Andreas Wirth
5	R2	(Germany) Nürburgring	23 August	No. 26 Callaway Competition	No. 26 Callaway Competition
5	R2	(Germany) Nürburgring	23 August	(Germany) Marc Hennerici (Germany) Luca Ludwig	(Germany) Marc Hennerici (Germany) Luca Ludwig
6	R1	(Germany) Sachsenring	19 September	No. 12 Phoenix Racing	No. 12 Phoenix Racing
6	R1	(Germany) Sachsenring	19 September	(Germany) Christopher Haase (Switzerland) Henri Moser	(Germany) Christopher Haase (Switzerland) Henri Moser
6	R2	(Germany) Sachsenring	20 September	No. 7 Abt Sportsline	No. 12 Phoenix Racing
6	R2	(Germany) Sachsenring	20 September	(Germany) Florian Gruber (Germany) Peter Terting	(Germany) Christopher Haase (Switzerland) Henri Moser
7	R1	(Germany) Motorsport Arena Oschersleben	17 October	No. 33 Alpina	No. 34 Alpina
7	R1	(Germany) Motorsport Arena Oschersleben	17 October	(Germany) Jens Klingmann (Germany) Andreas Wirth	(Germany) Claudia Hürtgen (Belgium) Maxime Martin
7	R2	(Germany) Motorsport Arena Oschersleben	18 October	No. 2 Mühlner Motorsport	No. 34 Alpina
7	R2	(Germany) Motorsport Arena Oschersleben	18 October	(Germany) Johannes Stuck (United Kingdom) Richard Westbrook	(Germany) Claudia Hürtgen (Belgium) Maxime Martin

== Standings ==
Pos	Driver	OSC (Germany)		ASS (Netherlands)		HOC (Germany)		LAU (Germany)		NÜR (Germany)		SAC (Germany)		OSC (Germany)		Pts
1	(Germany) Christian Abt	7	Ret	**1**	**1**	2	**1**	**2**	10	Ret	2	3	2	4	7	79
2	(Germany) Marc Hennerici (Germany) Luca Ludwig	**1**	1	8	Ret	5	9	4	6	2	**1**	2	Ret	Ret	3	67
3	(Switzerland) Henri Moser	4	5	4	3	17	5	1	7	6	6	**1**	1	9	9	64
4	(Germany) Christian Hohenadel	3	10	3	2	6	Ret	8	**1**	4	4	4	3	7	Ret	58
=	(Switzerland) Toni Seiler	3	10	3	2	6	Ret	8	**1**	4	4	4	3	7	Ret	58
5	(Germany) Jan Seyffarth			**1**	**1**	2	**1**	**2**	10	Ret	2					54
6	(France) Nicolas Armindo (Portugal) César Campaniço	6	6	2	Ret	**1**	2	11	4	7	5	5	Ret	10	4	53
7	(Germany) Tim Bergmeister (Germany) Frank Schmickler	2	2	Ret	5	Ret	3	5	8	5	3	8	4	6	8	53
8	(Germany) Christopher Haase							1	7	6	6	**1**	1	9	9	40
9	(Austria) Walter Lechner Jr. (Denmark) Christoffer Nygaard	5	4	5	4	3	7	15	2	10	13			8	Ret	36
10	(Germany) Frank Kechele	Ret	**3**	Ret	8	4	4	DNS	DNS	3	21	10	DSQ	3	6	35
=	(Poland) Kuba Giermaziak	Ret	**3**	Ret	8	4	4	DNS	DNS	3	21			3	6	35
12	(Denmark) Michael Outzen	4	5	4	3	17	5	3	5	Ret	9					34
13	(Germany) Christopher Mies							3	5	Ret	9	3	2	4	7	33
14	(Germany) Jens Klingmann (Germany) Andreas Wirth					16	6			**1**	Ret			**2**	Ret	23
15	(Germany) Marcel Leipert	Ret	7	7	Ret	Ret	14	6	3	12	10	6	Ret	Ret	19	16
16	(Germany) Norman Knop	Ret	Ret	6	6	7	Ret	7	16	Ret	8	9	5	11	18	15
17	(Germany) Daniel Keilwitz							6	3	12	10	6	Ret	Ret	19	12
18	(Italy) Diego Alessi (France) Dino Lunardi													Ret	2	10
19	(Germany) Florian Gruber									8	7	7	**Ret**	5	10	10
=	(Germany) Peter Terting							9	13	8	7	7	**Ret**	5	10	10
20	(Czech Republic) Martin Matzke	Ret	Ret	6	6	7	Ret	7	16							10
21	(Belgium) Tim Verbegt											10	DSQ			0
22	(United Kingdom) Richard Westbrook													Ret	**5**	5
=	(Germany) Johannes Stuck	11	11											Ret	**5**	5
23	(Germany) Stian Sørlie	Ret	7	7	Ret	Ret	14									4
24	(Germany) Jürgen Häring	10	8	11	7	10	Ret	12	9	16	12	11	7	12	13	5
25	(Germany) Ronnie Bremer											9	5	11	18	4
26	(Greece) Dimitri Konstantinou	10	8			10	Ret	12	9	16	12	11	7	12	13	3
=	(Austria) Gusti Eder											13	6	16	16	3
=	(Austria) Ruben Zeltner											13	6			3
=	(Germany) Freddy Kremer	8	9	12	10	13	8	13	12	15	15	12	9	15	14	2
=	(South Africa) Shane Williams	7	Ret					9	13							2
=	(Greece) Dimitris Deverikos			11	7											2
32	(Germany) Oliver Mayer	12	14	9	Ret	8	Ret	Ret	14							1
=	(Japan) Sakon Yamamoto	12	14	9	Ret	8	Ret	Ret	14	18	18	Ret	DNS	14	12	1
=	(Switzerland) Fredy Barth									Ret	8					1
=	(Germany) Björn Grossmann			12	10	13	8			15	15	12	9	15	14	1
=	(Germany) Thomas Jäger	8	9					13	12							1
	(Netherlands) Michael Bleekemolen (Netherlands) Ronald van de Laar			14	9	14	11			14	16	14	8	13	15	1
	(Germany) Alfred Renauer			10	11	9	10	10	11							0
	(Germany) Robert Renauer					9	10	10	11							0
	(Switzerland) Patrick Gerling	13	13	13	12	11	13	16	15	9	11					0
	(Switzerland) Peter Rikli									9	11					0
	(Germany) Thomas Mutsch (Brazil) Walter Salles	9	DNS													0
	(Germany) Michael Raja	14	Ret	10	11											0
	(Germany) Ronny Melkus	11	11													0
	(Switzerland) Felix Beck			13	12	11	13									0
	(Germany) Sascha Bert (Germany) Marc Bronzel									11	20					0
	(Germany) Harald Becker (Germany) Peter Scharmach					12	12	DNS	DNS							0
	(Germany) Marc Gindorf (Germany) Frank Kräling	15	12							13	14					0
	(Brazil) Paolo Bonifacio											Ret	DNS	14	12	0
	(Switzerland) Hans Hauser	13	13													0
	(Netherlands) Jan Lammers (Netherlands) Marius Ritskes			Ret	Ret	15	15	14	17							0
	(Germany) Manuel Lauck	14	Ret													0
	(Switzerland) Walter Brun							16	15							0
	(Germany) Georg Engelhardt													16	16	0
	(France) Jean-Marc Bachelier (France) Yannick Mallegol									17	19					0
	(Switzerland) Cyndie Allemann (Germany) Sven Hannawald									Ret	17					0
	(Germany) Kris Heidorn (Germany) Marc Walz													Ret	17	0
	(Austria) Franz Binder									18	18					0
	(Germany) Lance David Arnold (Germany) Thomas Neumann											Ret	DNS			0
	(Germany) Christoph Langen (Germany) Horst von Saurma-Jeltsch											Ret	DNS			0
	(France) Jean-Marc Gounon (France) Arnaud Peyroles					DNS	DNS									0
Guest drivers ineligible for points
	(Germany) Claudia Hürtgen (Belgium) Maxime Martin													1	1	0
Pos	Driver	OSC (Germany)		ASS (Netherlands)		HOC (Germany)		LAU (Germany)		NÜR (Germany)		SAC (Germany)		OSC (Germany)		Pts

Colour	Result
Gold	Winner
Silver	Second place
Bronze	Third place
Green	Points classification
Blue	Non-points classification
Blue	Non-classified finish (NC)
Purple	Retired, not classified (Ret)
Red	Did not qualify (DNQ)
Red	Did not pre-qualify (DNPQ)
Black	Disqualified (DSQ)
White	Did not start (DNS)
White	Withdrew (WD)
White	Race cancelled (C)
Blank	Did not practice (DNP)
Blank	Did not arrive (DNA)
Blank	Excluded (EX)

**Bold** - Pole
Italics - Fastest Lap
