= Kuba Giermaziak =

Polish racing driver

Jakub Giermaziak
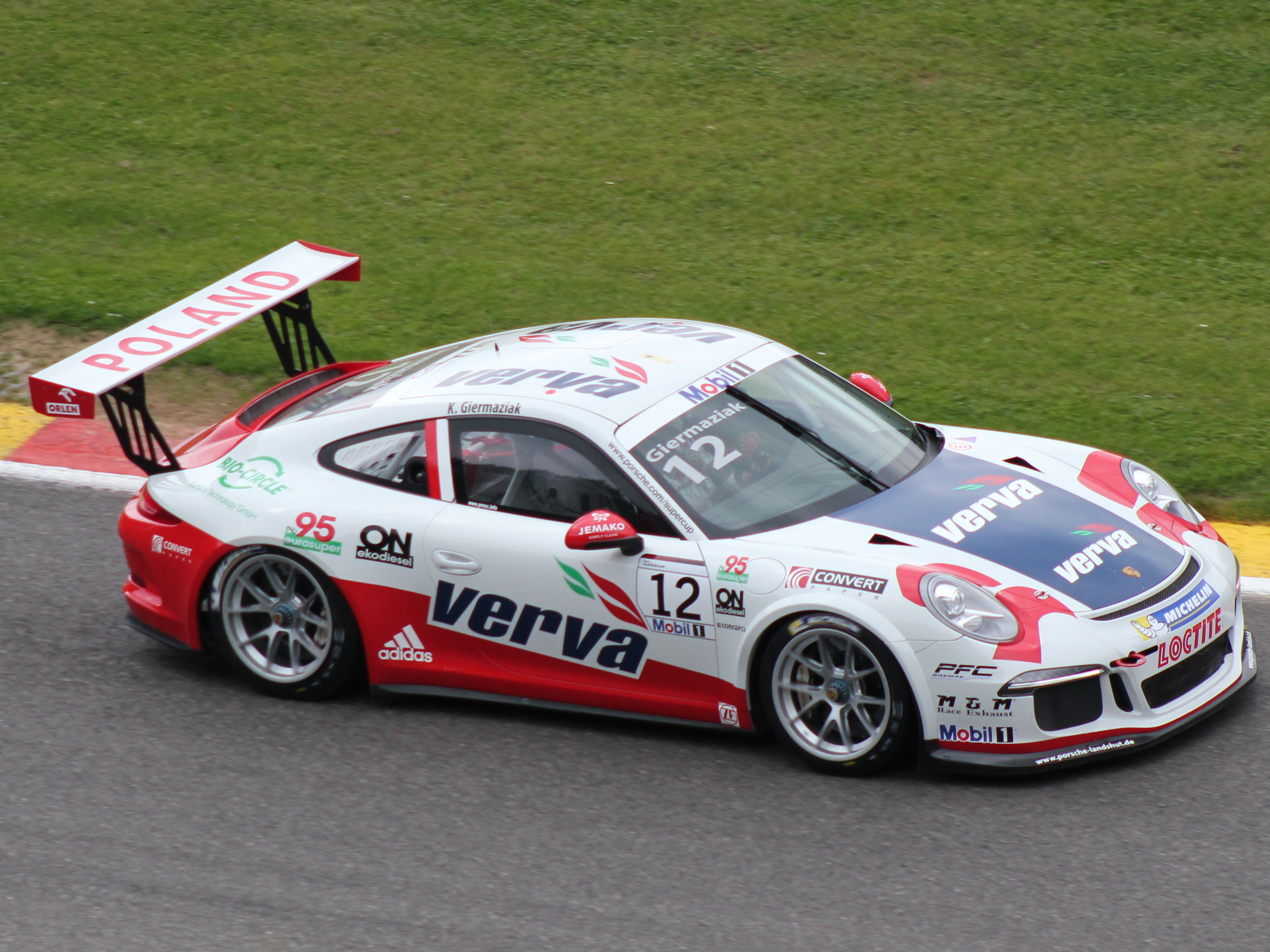
- Giermaziak at Circuit de Spa-Francorchamps in 2013
- Nationality: (Poland) Polish
- Born: Jakub Giermaziak; 9 July 1990 (age 36) Gostyń, Poland

Porsche Supercup career
- Debut season: 2010
- Current team: VERVA Racing Team
- Categorisation: FIA Silver (until 2011); FIA Gold (2012–)
- Car number: 10
- Starts: 46
- Wins: 5
- Poles: 6
- Fastest laps: 3

Previous series
- 2009 2008 2007–09 2007–09: ADAC GT Masters; FR2.0 Portugal Winter Series; Formula Renault 2.0 NEC; Eurocup Formula Renault 2.0

Jakub "Kuba" Giermaziak (born 9 July 1990 in Gostyń, Poland) is a Polish racing driver and CEO of the esports organisation "Phantom Esports". He is the 2022 champion of the Nürburgring Endurance Series in the SP9 class.

== Racing record ==
=== Career summary ===
Season	Series	Team	Races	Wins	Poles	F/Laps	Podiums	Points	Position
2007	Formula Renault 2.0 NEC	Motopark Academy	15	0	0	0	0	97	10th
2007	Formula Renault 2.0 Eurocup	Motopark Academy	2	0	0	0	0	0	NC
2008	Formula Renault 2.0 Eurocup	Motopark Academy	14	0	0	0	0	10	18th
2008	Formula Renault 2.0 NEC	Motopark Academy	14	0	0	0	5	206	6th
2008	Portuguese Formula Renault 2.0 Winter Series	Motopark Academy	2	0	0	0	0	4	18th
2009	Formula Renault 2.0 Eurocup	Motopark Academy	8	0	0	0	1	32	9th
2009	Formula Renault 2.0 NEC	Motopark Academy	10	0	0	0	1	115	14th
2009	ADAC GT Masters	Argo Racing	10	0	0	1	3	35	11th
2010	Porsche Supercup	VERVA Racing Team	10	0	0	0	0	56	10th
2010	ADAC GT Masters	Abt Sportsline	10	2	2	0	4	42	8th
2011	Formula 3 Euroseries	STAR Racing Team	18	0	0	0	0	29	12th
2011	Porsche Supercup	VERVA Racing Team	11	2	2	1	4	140	**3rd**
2011	Porsche Carrera World Cup	PZ Aschaffenburg Uwe Alzen Automotive	1	0	0	0	0	N/A	23rd
2011	ADAC GT Masters	Black Falcon	2	0	0	0	0	0	NC
2012	Porsche Supercup	VERVA Racing Team	10	0	1	0	1	99	7th
2012	American Le Mans Series - GTC	NGT Motorsport	1	1	0	0	1	24	18th
2013	Porsche Supercup	VERVA Racing Team	9	0	1	1	3	105	5th
2013	ADAC GT Masters	Farnbacher Racing	4	0	0	0	0	2	36th
2013	European Le Mans Series - GTC	Momo Megatron DF1	2	0	1	0	0	16	8th
2013	American Le Mans Series - GTC	NGT Motorsport	2	0	0	0	0	0	NC
2013	Rolex Sports Car Series - GT	MOMO/NGT Motorsport	1	0	0	0	0	16	62nd
2014	Porsche Supercup	VERVA Lechner Racing Team	10	3	2	1	4	132	**2nd**
2014	United SportsCar Championship - GTD	NGT Motorsport	6	0	0	0	0	92	30th
2015	Porsche Supercup	VERVA Lechner Racing Team	10	0	0	0	1	63	11th
2015	United SportsCar Championship - GTD	GB Autosport	2	0	0	0	0	26	43rd
2015	24 Hours of Le Mans - GTE Am	JMW Motorsport	1	0	0	0	0	N/A	7th
2016	European Le Mans Series - LMP2	Greaves Motorsport	2	0	0	0	0	8	14th
2019	Porsche Sprint Challenge Central Europe	Lechner Racing	2	2	1	0	2	25	17th
2021	24 Hours of Nürburgring - SP9	Walkenhorst Motorsport	1	0	0	0	0	N/A	12th
2022	Nürburgring Endurance Series - SP9	Scherer Sport Team Phoenix	8	4	1	1	5	210	**1st**
2022	24 Hours of Nürburgring - SP9	Scherer Sport Team Phoenix	1	0	0	0	0	N/A	5th
2023	Nürburgring Endurance Series - SP9	Walkenhorst Motorsport	9	5	1	1	5	0	NC†
2023	24 Hours of Nürburgring - SP9	Walkenhorst Motorsport	1	0	0	0	0	N/A	DNF
2024	Nürburgring Langstrecken-Serie - SP9	Walkenhorst Motorsport	2	0	0	0	0	?	?
2024	24 Hours of Nürburgring - SP9	Walkenhorst Motorsport	1	0	0	0	0	N/A	DNF
2024	International GT Open	Team Motopark	1	0	1	0	1	0	NC†

^{†} As Giermaziak was a guest driver, he was ineligible to score points.

=== Complete Formula Renault 2.0 NEC results ===
(key) (Races in bold indicate pole position) (Races in italics indicate fastest lap)

Year	Entrant	1	2	3	4	5	6	7	8	9	10	11	12	13	14	15	16	DC	Points
2007	Motopark Academy	ZAN; 1; 20	ZAN; 2; 21	OSC; 1 Ret	OSC; 2; 14	ASS; 1; 22†	ASS; 2; 8	ZOL; 1; 16	ZOL; 1; 11	NUR; 1; 10	NUR; 2; 8	OSC; 1; 9	OSC; 2 Ret	SPA; 1; 10	SPA; 2; 20	HOC; 1; 17	HOC; 2; 13	10th	97
2008	Motopark Academy	HOC; 1; 4	HOC; 2; 4	ZAN; 1; 3	ZAN; 2; 21	ALA; 1; 3	ALA; 2; 7	OSC; 1	OSC; 2	ASS; 1; 2	ASS; 2; 2	ZOL; 1; 7	ZOL; 2 Ret	NÜR; 1; 2	NÜR; 2; 4	SPA; 1; 6	SPA; 2; 27†	6th	206
2009	Motopark Academy	ZAN; 1	ZAN; 2	HOC; 1	HOC; 2	ALA; 1	ALA; 2	OSC; 1; 4	OSC; 2; 4	ASS; 1; 4	ASS; 2; 8	MST; 1; 12	MST; 2; 11	NÜR; 1; 2	NÜR; 2 Ret	SPA; 1; 13	SPA; 2 Ret	14th	115

=== Complete Eurocup Formula Renault 2.0 results ===
(key) (Races in bold indicate pole position; races in italics indicate fastest lap)

Year	Entrant	1	2	3	4	5	6	7	8	9	10	11	12	13	14	DC	Points
2007	Motopark Academy	ZOL; 1	ZOL; 2	NÜR; 1	NÜR; 2	HUN; 1	HUN; 2	DON; 1	DON; 2	MAG; 1	MAG; 2	EST; 1	EST; 2	CAT; 1 Ret	CAT; 2; 26	NC†	0
2008	Motopark Academy	SPA; 1; 22	SPA; 2 Ret	SIL; 1; 25	SIL; 2; 25	HUN; 1; 10	HUN; 2; 31	NÜR; 1; 9	NÜR; 2; 7	LMS; 1 Ret	LMS; 2 Ret	EST; 1; 13	EST; 2; 8	CAT; 1; 14	CAT; 2; 27	18th	10
2009	Motopark Academy	CAT; 1	CAT; 2	SPA; 1	SPA; 2	HUN; 1 Ret	HUN; 2; 4	SIL; 1	SIL; 2	LMS; 1; 11	LMS; 2; 8	NÜR; 1; 2	NÜR; 2; 6	ALC; 1; 8	ALC; 2 Ret	9th	32

† As Giermaziak was a guest driver, he was ineligible for points

=== Complete Porsche Supercup results ===
(key) (Races in bold indicate pole position) (Races in italics indicate fastest lap)

Year	Team	1	2	3	4	5	6	7	8	9	10	11	Pos.	Pts
2010	VERVA Racing Team	BHR; 12	BHR; 14	ESP; DSQ	MON; 13	ESP; 14	GBR; 5	GER; 15	HUN; 6	BEL; 7	ITA; 10		10th	56
2011	VERVA Racing Team	TUR; 7	ESP; 3	MON; 5	NÜR; 12	GBR; 8	**GER**; 2	HUN; 1	**BEL**; 1	ITA; 6	UAE; 10	UAE; 6	**3rd**	**140**
2012	VERVA Racing Team	BHR; 8	BHR; 5	MON; 7	VAL; 10	**GBR**; 4	GER; Ret	HUN; 9	HUN; 3	BEL; 7	ITA; 4		7th	99
2013	VERVA Racing Team	ESP; 4	MON; 2	GBR; 5	GER; Ret	HUN; 3	**BEL**; 11	ITA; 6	UAE; 3	UAE; 6			5th	105
2014	VERVA Lechner Racing Team	ESP; 8	**MON**; 1	AUT; 1	GBR; 2	GER; 6	**HUN**; 1	BEL; 8	ITA; 4	USA; 11	USA; 7		**2nd**	**132**
2015	VERVA Lechner Racing Team	ESP; 2	MON; 9	AUT; 12	GBR; 11	HUN; 4	BEL; 9	BEL; 14	ITA; Ret	ITA; 13	USA; C	USA; Ret	11th	63

=== Complete WeatherTech SportsCar Championship results ===
(key) (Races in bold indicate pole position; results in italics indicate fastest lap)

Year	Team	Class	Make	Engine	1	2	3	4	5	6	7	8	9	10	11	Rank	Points
2014	NGT Motorsport	GTD	Porsche 911 GT America	Porsche 4.0 L Flat-6	DAY; 9	SEB; 22	LGA	DET; 19	WGL; 6	MOS	IND	ELK	VIR	COA	PET; DNS	30th	92
2015	GB Autosport	GTD	Porsche 911 GT America	Porsche 4.0 L Flat-6	DAY; 7	SEB; 13†	LGA	BEL	WGL	LIM	ELK	VIR	AUS	ATL		43rd	26

^{†} Giermaziak did not complete sufficient laps in order to score full points.

=== Complete Formula 3 Euro Series results ===
(key)

Year	Entrant	Chassis	Engine	1	2	3	4	5	6	7	8	9	10	11	12	13	14	15	16	17	18	19	20	21	22	23	24	25	26	27	DC	Points
2011	STAR Racing Team	Dallara F308/096	Volkswagen	LEC; 1; 7	LEC; 2; 8	LEC; 3 Ret	HOC; 1; 14	HOC; 2; 14	HOC; 3 Ret	ZAN; 1 Ret	ZAN; 2; 10	ZAN; 3; 9	RBR; 1; 12	RBR; 2; 8	RBR; 3; 9	NOR; 1; 7	NOR; 2 Ret	NOR; 3; 6	NÜR; 1; 11	NÜR; 2; 10	NÜR; 3; 11	SIL; 1	SIL; 2	SIL; 3	VAL; 1	VAL; 2	VAL; 3	HOC; 1	HOC; 2	HOC; 3	12th	29

=== Complete 24 Hours of Le Mans results ===
Year	Team	Co-Drivers	Car	Class	Laps	Pos.	Class Pos.
2015	(United Kingdom) JMW Motorsport	(United States) Michael Avenatti (Saudi Arabia) Abdulaziz al Faisal	Ferrari 458 Italia GT2	GTE; Am	320	36th	7th

=== Complete Nürburgring Endurance Series results ===
Year	Team	Car	Class	1	2	3	4	5	6	7	8	9	Pos.	Points
2022	Scherer Sport Team Phoenix	Audi R8 LMS Evo II	SP9	NÜR; 1; 7	NÜR; 2	NÜR; 3; 6	NÜR; 4; 1	NÜR; 5 Ret	NÜR; 6; 2	NÜR; 7; 1	NÜR; 8; 1	NÜR; 9; 1	1st	?
2023	Walkenhorst Motorsport	BMW M4 GT3	SP9	NÜR; 1 Ret	NÜR; 2; 1	NÜR; 3 Ret	NÜR; 4; 1	NÜR; 5 Ret	NÜR; 6; 1	NÜR; 7; 1	NÜR; 8; 1	NÜR; 9; 4	NC†	0

^{†}As Giermaziak was a guest driver, he was ineligible for points.
