= 2011 ADAC GT Masters =

Motorsport season

Seasons
- ← 2010 2012 →

The 2011 ADAC GT Masters season was the fifth season of the ADAC GT Masters, the grand tourer-style sports car racing founded by the German automobile club ADAC. It began on 24 April at Motorsport Arena Oschersleben and finished on 2 October at Hockenheim after eight double-header meetings. Dino Lunardi and Alexandros Margaritis claimed the championship title.

== Entry list ==
| Team | Car | No. | Drivers | Rounds |
|---|---|---|---|---|
| (Germany) Reiter Engineering | Lamborghini Gallardo LP600+ | 1 | (Germany) Albert von Thurn und Taxis | 1–4, 6–8 |
| (Germany) Reiter Engineering | Lamborghini Gallardo LP600+ | 1 | (Germany) Philip Geipel | 1–4, 6–8 |
| (Germany) Reiter Engineering | Lamborghini Gallardo LP600+ | 2 | (Germany) Ferdinand Stuck | All |
| (Germany) Reiter Engineering | Lamborghini Gallardo LP600+ | 2 | (Germany) Johannes Stuck | All |
| (Germany) Reiter Engineering | Lamborghini Gallardo LP600+ | 24 | (Switzerland) Marc A. Hayek | All |
| (Germany) Reiter Engineering | Lamborghini Gallardo LP600+ | 24 | (Netherlands) Peter Kox | All |
| (Germany) Reiter Engineering | Lamborghini Gallardo LP600+ | 25 | (Malaysia) Tunku Hammam Sulong | 1–3 |
| (Germany) Reiter Engineering | Lamborghini Gallardo LP600+ | 25 | (Germany) Frank Kechele | 1–3 |
| (Germany) Abt Sportsline | Audi R8 LMS | 3 | (Germany) Luca Ludwig | 1–6 |
| (Germany) Abt Sportsline | Audi R8 LMS | 3 | (Germany) Christopher Mies | All |
| (Germany) Abt Sportsline | Audi R8 LMS | 3 | (Germany) Christer Jöns | 7–8 |
| (Germany) Abt Sportsline | Audi R8 LMS | 4 | (Germany) Jens Klingmann | All |
| (Germany) Abt Sportsline | Audi R8 LMS | 4 | (Germany) Christer Jöns | 1–6 |
| (Germany) Abt Sportsline | Audi R8 LMS | 4 | (Germany) Luca Ludwig | 7, 8 |
| (Belgium) Mühlner Motorsport | Porsche 911 GT3 R | 5 | (Germany) Frank Schmickler | 1–4, 6–8 |
| (Belgium) Mühlner Motorsport | Porsche 911 GT3 R | 5 | (Germany) Charlie Geipel | 1–4 |
| (Belgium) Mühlner Motorsport | Porsche 911 GT3 R | 5 | (Germany) Marc Basseng | 5 |
| (Belgium) Mühlner Motorsport | Porsche 911 GT3 R | 5 | (Germany) Tim Bergmeister | 5 |
| (Belgium) Mühlner Motorsport | Porsche 911 GT3 R | 5 | (United Kingdom) Sean Edwards | 6 |
| (Belgium) Mühlner Motorsport | Porsche 911 GT3 R | 5 | (France) Gilles Vannelet | 7 |
| (Belgium) Mühlner Motorsport | Porsche 911 GT3 R | 5 | (Switzerland) Remo Lips | 8 |
| (Belgium) Mühlner Motorsport | Porsche 911 GT3 Cup S | 6 | (Germany) Norman Knop | 1 |
| (Belgium) Mühlner Motorsport | Porsche 911 GT3 Cup S | 6 | (Germany) Manuel Lauck | 1 |
| (Belgium) Mühlner Motorsport | Porsche 911 GT3 Cup S | 6 | (Germany) Steve Kirsch | 2 |
| (Belgium) Mühlner Motorsport | Porsche 911 GT3 Cup S | 6 | (Germany) Marcel Leipert | 2 |
| (Belgium) Mühlner Motorsport | Porsche 911 GT3 Cup S | 6 | (United Arab Emirates) Karim al-Azhari | 4 |
| (Belgium) Mühlner Motorsport | Porsche 911 GT3 Cup S | 6 | (Austria) Martin Ragginger | 4 |
| (Germany) Phoenix Racing Pole Promotion | Audi R8 LMS | 7 | (Sweden) Andreas Simonsen | All |
| (Germany) Phoenix Racing Pole Promotion | Audi R8 LMS | 7 | (Germany) Christopher Haase | All |
| (Germany) Phoenix Racing Pole Promotion | Audi R8 LMS | 8 | (Germany) René Rast | 1–3, 5, 6, 8 |
| (Germany) Phoenix Racing Pole Promotion | Audi R8 LMS | 8 | (Austria) Stefan Landmann | All |
| (Germany) Phoenix Racing Pole Promotion | Audi R8 LMS | 8 | (Italy) Andrea Piccini | 4 |
| (Germany) Phoenix Racing Pole Promotion | Audi R8 LMS | 8 | (Sweden) Jimmy Johansson | 7 |
| (Germany) a-workx FROGREEN CO2 neutral | Porsche 911 GT3 R | 9 | (Germany) Wolfgang Hageleit | All |
| (Germany) a-workx FROGREEN CO2 neutral | Porsche 911 GT3 R | 9 | (Germany) Florian Fritsch | 1–4 |
| (Germany) a-workx FROGREEN CO2 neutral | Porsche 911 GT3 R | 9 | (Germany) Roland Asch | 5–8 |
| (Germany) a-workx Akrapovic | Porsche 911 GT3 R | 10 | (Germany) Michael Ammermüller | All |
| (Germany) a-workx Akrapovic | Porsche 911 GT3 R | 10 | (Germany) Sebastian Asch | All |
| (Germany) Team rhino's Leipert Motorsport | Lamborghini Gallardo LP600+ | 11 | (Germany) David Mengesdorf | 1–4, 6, 8 |
| (Germany) Team rhino's Leipert Motorsport | Lamborghini Gallardo LP600+ | 11 | (Germany) Dennis Vollmair | 1–4 |
| (Germany) Team rhino's Leipert Motorsport | Lamborghini Gallardo LP600+ | 11 | (Denmark) Ronnie Bremer | 5 |
| (Germany) Team rhino's Leipert Motorsport | Lamborghini Gallardo LP600+ | 11 | (Germany) Marcel Leipert | 5, 6 |
| (Germany) Team rhino's Leipert Motorsport | Lamborghini Gallardo LP600+ | 11 | (Germany) Norman Knop | 7 |
| (Germany) Team rhino's Leipert Motorsport | Lamborghini Gallardo LP600+ | 11 | (Finland) Mika Vähämäki | 7, 8 |
| (Germany) Team rhino's Leipert Motorsport | Lamborghini Gallardo LP600+ | 12 | (Russia) Oleg Petrishin | All |
| (Germany) Team rhino's Leipert Motorsport | Lamborghini Gallardo LP600+ | 12 | (Germany) Marcel Leipert | 1, 3 |
| (Germany) Team rhino's Leipert Motorsport | Lamborghini Gallardo LP600+ | 12 | (Lithuania) Andzej Dzikevic | 2 |
| (Germany) Team rhino's Leipert Motorsport | Lamborghini Gallardo LP600+ | 12 | (Austria) Martin Karlhofer | 4, 5 |
| (Germany) Team rhino's Leipert Motorsport | Lamborghini Gallardo LP600+ | 12 | (Germany) Tobias Neuser | 6–8 |
| (Germany) 9 Elf Team Dutt | Porsche 911 GT3 R | 13 | (Germany) Oliver Dutt | All |
| (Germany) 9 Elf Team Dutt | Porsche 911 GT3 R | 13 | (Germany) Oliver Strasser | 1, 4–8 |
| (Germany) 9 Elf Team Dutt | Porsche 911 GT3 R | 13 | (Germany) Harald Schlotter | 2 |
| (Germany) 9 Elf Team Dutt | Porsche 911 GT3 R | 13 | (Austria) Patrick Ortlieb | 3 |
| (Germany) 9 Elf Team Dutt | Porsche 911 GT3 Cup S | 14 | (United Kingdom) Peter Venn | 1 |
| (Germany) 9 Elf Team Dutt | Porsche 911 GT3 Cup S | 14 | (Germany) Uwe Klee | 1 |
| (Germany) 9 Elf Team Dutt | Audi R8 LMS | 14 | (Switzerland) Pierre von Mentlen | 4 |
| (Germany) 9 Elf Team Dutt | Audi R8 LMS | 14 | (Germany) Markus Winkelhock | 4 |
| (Switzerland) FACH AUTO TECH | Porsche 911 GT3 R | 15 | (Austria) Daniel Dobitsch | All |
| (Switzerland) FACH AUTO TECH | Porsche 911 GT3 R | 15 | (Germany) Swen Dolenc | All |
| (Switzerland) FACH AUTO TECH | Porsche 911 GT3 R | 16 | (Germany) Otto Klohs | All |
| (Switzerland) FACH AUTO TECH | Porsche 911 GT3 R | 16 | (Germany) Jens Richter | All |
| (Germany) NK Racing Team | Lamborghini Gallardo GT3 | 17 | (Germany) Carsten Seifert | 1, 2, 4–8 |
| (Germany) NK Racing Team | Lamborghini Gallardo GT3 | 17 | (Germany) Michael Golz | 1, 2, 4–8 |
| (Germany) Callaway Competition | Corvette Z06.R GT3 | 18 | (Switzerland) Toni Seiler | All |
| (Germany) Callaway Competition | Corvette Z06.R GT3 | 18 | (Austria) Philipp Eng | All |
| (Germany) Callaway Competition | Corvette Z06.R GT3 | 19 | (Switzerland) Hans Hauser | 1 |
| (Germany) Callaway Competition | Corvette Z06.R GT3 | 19 | (Switzerland) Remo Lips | 1, 3, 4 |
| (Germany) Callaway Competition | Corvette Z06.R GT3 | 19 | (Netherlands) Marius Ritskes | 2 |
| (Germany) Callaway Competition | Corvette Z06.R GT3 | 19 | (Netherlands) Mike Hezemans | 2 |
| (Germany) Callaway Competition | Corvette Z06.R GT3 | 19 | (Switzerland) André Lips | 3, 4 |
| (Germany) Callaway Competition | Corvette Z06.R GT3 | 19 | (Switzerland) Heinz Kehl | 5 |
| (Germany) Callaway Competition | Corvette Z06.R GT3 | 19 | (Switzerland) Andrina Gugger | 5 |
| (Germany) Callaway Competition | Corvette Z06.R GT3 | 19 | (Switzerland) Alfredo Sagilari | 6–8 |
| (Germany) Callaway Competition | Corvette Z06.R GT3 | 19 | (Austria) Markus Fux | 6 |
| (Germany) Callaway Competition | Corvette Z06.R GT3 | 19 | (Switzerland) Christoph Weber | 7 |
| (Germany) Callaway Competition | Corvette Z06.R GT3 | 19 | (Germany) Wolf Silvester | 8 |
| (Germany) Callaway Competition | Corvette Z06.R GT3 | 27 | (Germany) Sven Hannawald | All |
| (Germany) Callaway Competition | Corvette Z06.R GT3 | 27 | (Germany) Heinz-Harald Frentzen | All |
| (Germany) Callaway Competition | Corvette Z06.R GT3 | 28 | (Germany) Daniel Keilwitz | All |
| (Germany) Callaway Competition | Corvette Z06.R GT3 | 28 | (Italy) Diego Alessi | All |
| (Germany) Black Falcon | Mercedes-Benz SLS AMG GT3 | 20 | (Germany) Kenneth Heyer | All |
| (Germany) Black Falcon | Mercedes-Benz SLS AMG GT3 | 20 | (Germany) Robert Renauer | 1–6, 8 |
| (Germany) Black Falcon | Mercedes-Benz SLS AMG GT3 | 20 | (Poland) Kuba Giermaziak | 7 |
| (Germany) Black Falcon | Mercedes-Benz SLS AMG GT3 | 21 | (Germany) Jan Seyffarth | 1, 3–6, 8 |
| (Germany) Black Falcon | Mercedes-Benz SLS AMG GT3 | 21 | (Germany) Oliver Mayer | All |
| (Germany) Black Falcon | Mercedes-Benz SLS AMG GT3 | 21 | (Germany) Uwe Nittel | 2 |
| (Germany) Black Falcon | Mercedes-Benz SLS AMG GT3 | 21 | (Germany) Thomas Jäger | 7 |
| (Germany) MS-Racing | Mercedes-Benz SLS AMG GT3 | 22 | (Russia) David Sigachev | 1–4 |
| (Germany) MS-Racing | Mercedes-Benz SLS AMG GT3 | 22 | (Germany) Florian Stoll | 1–6, 8 |
| (Germany) MS-Racing | Mercedes-Benz SLS AMG GT3 | 22 | (Germany) Thomas Jäger | 5, 6 |
| (Germany) MS-Racing | Mercedes-Benz SLS AMG GT3 | 22 | (Germany) Maximilian Mayer | 7 |
| (Germany) MS-Racing | Mercedes-Benz SLS AMG GT3 | 22 | (Italy) Francesco Lopez | 7 |
| (Germany) MS-Racing | Mercedes-Benz SLS AMG GT3 | 22 | (France) Renaud Derlot | 8 |
| (Germany) MS-Racing | Mercedes-Benz SLS AMG GT3 | 36 | (Germany) Maximilian Götz | 3–8 |
| (Germany) MS-Racing | Mercedes-Benz SLS AMG GT3 | 36 | (Germany) Maximilian Mayer | 3–6, 8 |
| (Germany) MS-Racing | Mercedes-Benz SLS AMG GT3 | 36 | (Germany) Florian Stoll | 7 |
| (Netherlands) Bleekemolen RacePlanet Racing | Porsche 911 GT3 R | 26 | (Netherlands) Ronald van de Laar | 1–2 |
| (Netherlands) Bleekemolen RacePlanet Racing | Porsche 911 GT3 R | 26 | (Netherlands) Michael Bleekemolen | 1–2 |
| (Netherlands) Bleekemolen RacePlanet Racing | Mercedes-Benz SLS AMG GT3 | 26 | (Netherlands) Ronald van de Laar | 3–8 |
| (Netherlands) Bleekemolen RacePlanet Racing | Mercedes-Benz SLS AMG GT3 | 26 | (Netherlands) Michael Bleekemolen | 3–8 |
| (Germany) Heger Sport | Porsche 911 GT3 R | 29 | (France) Nicolas Armindo | 1 |
| (Germany) Heger Sport | Porsche 911 GT3 R | 29 | (Germany) Stefan Wendt | 1 |
| (Germany) Heger Sport | Porsche 911 GT3 R | 29 | (France) Kévin Estre | 8 |
| (Germany) Heger Sport | Porsche 911 GT3 R | 29 | (Switzerland) Philipp Frommenwiler | 8 |
| (Germany) Heger Sport | Porsche 911 GT3 R | 30 | (Poland) Robert Lukas | 1 |
| (Germany) Heger Sport | Porsche 911 GT3 R | 30 | (Germany) Jürgen Häring | 1 |
| (Germany) Heger Sport | Porsche 911 GT3 R | 30 | (Austria) Sven Heyrowsky | 4 |
| (Germany) Heger Sport | Porsche 911 GT3 R | 30 | (France) Nicolas Armindo | 4, 6 |
| (Germany) Heger Sport | Porsche 911 GT3 R | 30 | (Germany) Andreas Iburg | 5 |
| (Germany) Heger Sport | Porsche 911 GT3 R | 30 | (Germany) Andreas Liehm | 5 |
| (Germany) Heger Sport | Porsche 911 GT3 R | 30 | (Germany) Stefan Wendt | 6 |
| (Germany) Heico Motorsport | Mercedes-Benz SLS AMG GT3 | 31 | (Germany) Thomas Holzer | All |
| (Germany) Heico Motorsport | Mercedes-Benz SLS AMG GT3 | 31 | (Germany) Carsten Tilke | All |
| (Germany) Heico Motorsport | Mercedes-Benz SLS AMG GT3 | 32 | (Austria) Dominik Baumann | All |
| (Germany) Heico Motorsport | Mercedes-Benz SLS AMG GT3 | 32 | (Austria) Harald Proczyk | All |
| (Germany) Heico Motorsport | Mercedes-Benz SLS AMG GT3 | 33 | (Netherlands) Christiaan Frankenhout | All |
| (Germany) Heico Motorsport | Mercedes-Benz SLS AMG GT3 | 33 | (Germany) Andreas Wirth | All |
| (Germany) Primajob Team Heico | Mercedes-Benz SLS AMG GT3 | 34 | (Germany) Lance David Arnold | All |
| (Germany) Primajob Team Heico | Mercedes-Benz SLS AMG GT3 | 34 | (Austria) Andreas Zuber | All |
| (Germany) Farnbacher ESET Racing | Ferrari 458 Italia GT3 | 35 | (Germany) Dominik Farnbacher | 1, 2, 4–7 |
| (Germany) Farnbacher ESET Racing | Ferrari 458 Italia GT3 | 35 | (Germany) Niclas Kentenich | All |
| (Germany) Farnbacher ESET Racing | Ferrari 458 Italia GT3 | 35 | (Germany) Marco Seefried | 3 |
| (Germany) Farnbacher ESET Racing | Ferrari 458 Italia GT3 | 35 | (Germany) Mario Farnbacher | 8 |
| (Germany) Oliver Mayer | Ferrari 458 Italia | 36 | (Germany) Maximilian Götz | 1 |
| (Germany) Oliver Mayer | Ferrari 458 Italia | 36 | (Germany) Maximilian Mayer | 1 |
| (Germany) Maximilian Mayer | Mercedes-Benz SLS AMG GT3 | 36 | (Germany) Maximilian Götz | 2 |
| (Germany) Maximilian Mayer | Mercedes-Benz SLS AMG GT3 | 36 | (Germany) Maximilian Mayer | 2 |
| (Germany) Vulkan Racing-Mintgen Motorsport | Dodge Viper Competition Coupé | 37 | (Germany) Sascha Bert | 1–6 |
| (Germany) Vulkan Racing-Mintgen Motorsport | Dodge Viper Competition Coupé | 37 | (Germany) Heiko Hammel | All |
| (Germany) Vulkan Racing-Mintgen Motorsport | Dodge Viper Competition Coupé | 37 | (Denmark) Michael Christensen | 7, 8 |
| (Germany) Vulkan Racing-Mintgen Motorsport | Dodge Viper Competition Coupé | 59 | (Germany) Christian Bebion | 6, 7 |
| (Germany) Vulkan Racing-Mintgen Motorsport | Dodge Viper Competition Coupé | 59 | (Denmark) Michael Christensen | 6 |
| (Germany) Vulkan Racing-Mintgen Motorsport | Dodge Viper Competition Coupé | 59 | (Canada) Kuno Wittmer | 7 |
| (Netherlands) Prosperia Team Brinkmann uhc | Audi R8 LMS | 39 | (Netherlands) Danny van Dongen | All |
| (Netherlands) Prosperia Team Brinkmann uhc | Audi R8 LMS | 39 | (Netherlands) Arjan van der Zwaan | 1–3 |
| (Netherlands) Prosperia Team Brinkmann uhc | Audi R8 LMS | 39 | (Netherlands) Ardi van der Hoek | 4–8 |
| (Germany) Liqui Moly Team Engstler | BMW Alpina B6 GT3 | 40 | (Germany) Florian Spengler | All |
| (Germany) Liqui Moly Team Engstler | BMW Alpina B6 GT3 | 40 | (Germany) Alex Plenagl | 1–5 |
| (Germany) Liqui Moly Team Engstler | BMW Alpina B6 GT3 | 40 | (Austria) Andreas Mayerl | 6 |
| (Germany) Liqui Moly Team Engstler | BMW Alpina B6 GT3 | 40 | (Netherlands) Tom Coronel | 7 |
| (Germany) Liqui Moly Team Engstler | BMW Alpina B6 GT3 | 40 | (Russia) Andrey Romanov | 8 |
| (Germany) Liqui Moly Team Engstler | BMW Alpina B6 GT3 | 41 | (France) Dino Lunardi | All |
| (Germany) Liqui Moly Team Engstler | BMW Alpina B6 GT3 | 41 | (Greece) Alexandros Margaritis | All |
| (Switzerland) Kessel Racing | Ferrari F430 Scuderia | 50 | (Germany) Freddy Kremer | 1–4 |
| (Switzerland) Kessel Racing | Ferrari F430 Scuderia | 50 | (Switzerland) Detlef Schmidt | 1–4 |
| (Germany) Haribo Team Manthey | Porsche 911 GT3 R | 51 | (Germany) Jochen Krumbach | 4 |
| (Germany) Haribo Team Manthey | Porsche 911 GT3 R | 51 | (Germany) Philipp Wlazik | 4 |
| (Sweden) WestCoast Racing | BMW Z4 GT3 | 52 | (Sweden) Lars Stugemo | 4 |
| (Sweden) WestCoast Racing | BMW Z4 GT3 | 52 | (Sweden) Fredrik Lestrup | 4, 6 |
| (Sweden) WestCoast Racing | BMW Z4 GT3 | 52 | (Sweden) Fredrik Larsson | 6–8 |
| (Sweden) WestCoast Racing | BMW Z4 GT3 | 52 | (Sweden) Richard Göransson | 7, 8 |
| (Austria) GRT Grasser Racing Team | Dodge Viper Competition Coupé | 53 | (Austria) Peter Ebner | 4, 5 |
| (Austria) GRT Grasser Racing Team | Dodge Viper Competition Coupé | 53 | (Austria) Gottfried Grasser | 4, 5 |
| (Germany) Herberth Motorsport | Porsche 911 GT3 R | 54 | (Germany) Christoph Schrezenmeier | 5, 6 |
| (Germany) Herberth Motorsport | Porsche 911 GT3 R | 54 | (Germany) Heinrich Kuhn-Weiss | 5, 6 |
| (Germany) Herberth Motorsport | Porsche 911 GT3 Cup S | 55 | (Germany) Dietmar Haggenmüller | 5 |
| (Germany) Herberth Motorsport | Porsche 911 GT3 Cup S | 55 | (Germany) Heiner Wackerbauer | 5, 6 |
| (Germany) Herberth Motorsport | Porsche 911 GT3 Cup S | 55 | (Germany) Norbert Janz | 6 |
| (Austria) G-Private Racing | Porsche 911 GT3 Cup S | 56 | (Austria) Jörg Peham | 5 |
| (Austria) G-Private Racing | Porsche 911 GT3 Cup S | 56 | (Austria) Richard Cvörnjek | 5 |
| (Germany) MRS Team PZ Aschaffenburg | Porsche 911 GT3 R | 57 | (Germany) Christian Engelhart | 5 |
| (Germany) MRS Team PZ Aschaffenburg | Porsche 911 GT3 R | 57 | (Austria) Norbert Siedler | 5 |
| (Switzerland) Novidem Swissracing Team | Audi R8 LMS | 58 | (Switzerland) Pierre von Mentlen | 5, 7, 8 |
| (Switzerland) Novidem Swissracing Team | Audi R8 LMS | 58 | (Germany) Markus Winkelhock | 5, 7, 8 |
| (Netherlands) Faster Racing by DB Motorsport | BMW Z4 GT3 | 60 | (Netherlands) Ricardo van der Ende | 7 |
| (Netherlands) Faster Racing by DB Motorsport | BMW Z4 GT3 | 60 | (Netherlands) Duncan Huisman | 7 |
| (Netherlands) Faster Racing by DB Motorsport | BMW Z4 GT3 | 61 | (Netherlands) Jeroen den Boer | 7 |
| (Netherlands) Faster Racing by DB Motorsport | BMW Z4 GT3 | 61 | (Netherlands) Simon Knap | 7 |
| (Germany) Lambda Performance | Ford GT GT3 | 62 | (Denmark) Nicki Thiim | 8 |
| (Germany) Lambda Performance | Ford GT GT3 | 62 | (Germany) Thomas Mutsch | 8 |
| (Germany) Lambda Performance | Ford GT GT3 | 63 | (Germany) Achim Winter | 8 |
| (Germany) Lambda Performance | Ford GT GT3 | 63 | (Germany) Alexander Müller | 8 |

== Race calendar and results ==
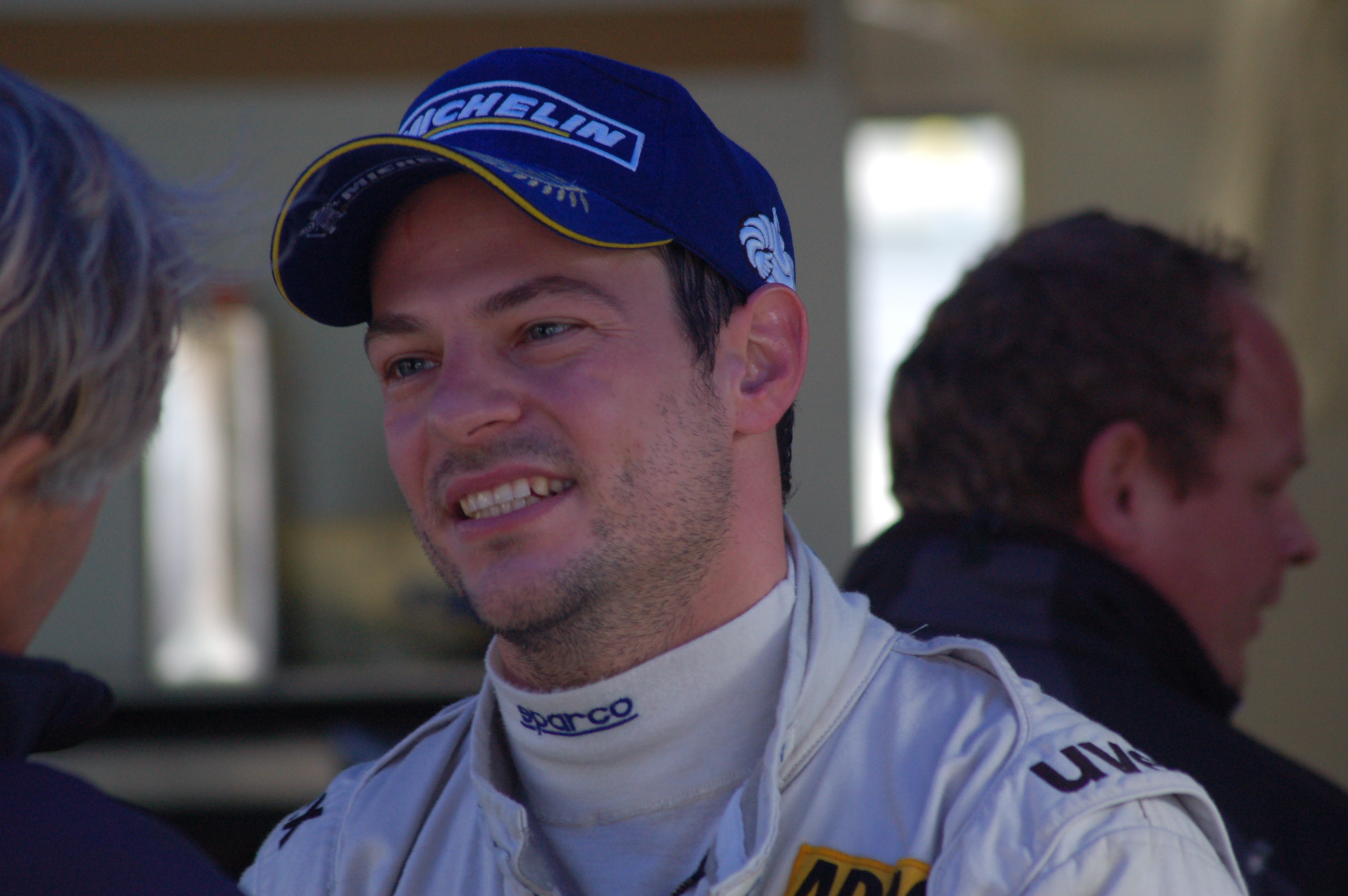

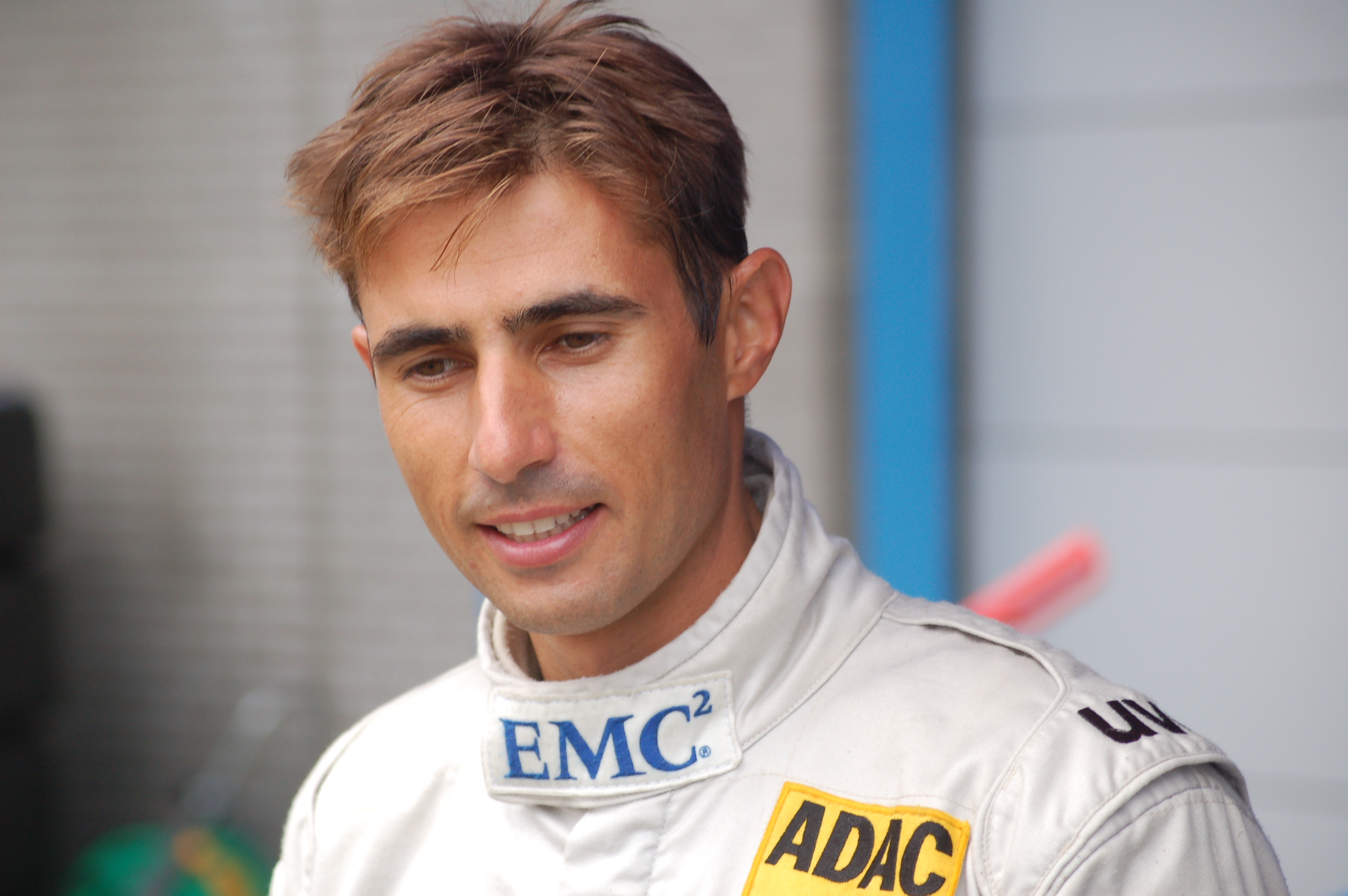
Alexandros Margaritis and Dino Lunardi won the 2011 ADAC GT Masters season.

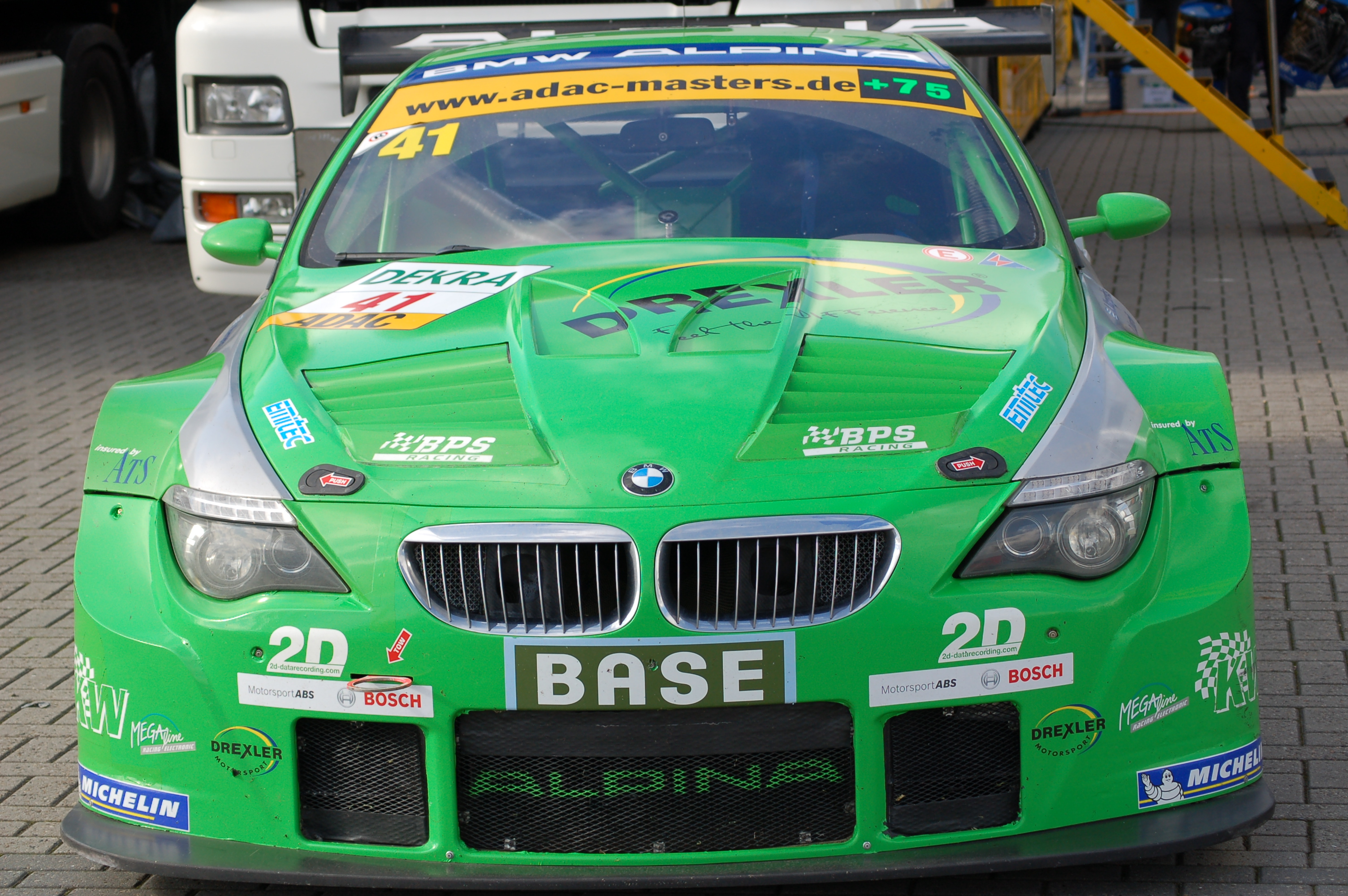
Championship-winning car Alpina B6 GT3 for Liqui Moly Team Engstler.

| Round | | Circuit | Date | Pole | Winner |
|---|---|---|---|---|---|
| 1 | R1 | (Germany) Motorsport Arena Oschersleben | 24 April | No. 41 Liqui Moly Team Engstler | No. 41 Liqui Moly Team Engstler |
| 1 | R1 | (Germany) Motorsport Arena Oschersleben | 24 April | (France) Dino Lunardi (Greece) Alexandros Margaritis | (France) Dino Lunardi (Greece) Alexandros Margaritis |
| 1 | R2 | (Germany) Motorsport Arena Oschersleben | 25 April | No. 25 Reiter | No. 2 Reiter |
| 1 | R2 | (Germany) Motorsport Arena Oschersleben | 25 April | (Malaysia) Tunku Hammam Sulong (Germany) Frank Kechele | (Germany) Ferdinand Stuck (Germany) Johannes Stuck |
| 2 | R1 | (Germany) Sachsenring | 14 May | No. 3 Team Abt Sportsline | No. 3 Team Abt Sportsline |
| 2 | R1 | (Germany) Sachsenring | 14 May | (Germany) Christopher Mies (Germany) Luca Ludwig | (Germany) Christopher Mies (Germany) Luca Ludwig |
| 2 | R2 | (Germany) Sachsenring | 9 May | No. 25 Reiter | No. 7 Phoenix Racing Pole Promotion |
| 2 | R2 | (Germany) Sachsenring | 9 May | (Malaysia) Tunku Hammam Sulong (Germany) Frank Kechele | (Germany) Christopher Haase (Sweden) Andreas Simonsen |
| 3 | R1 | (Belgium) Circuit Zolder | 10 June | No. 2 Reiter | No. 2 Reiter |
| 3 | R1 | (Belgium) Circuit Zolder | 10 June | (Germany) Ferdinand Stuck (Germany) Johannes Stuck | (Germany) Ferdinand Stuck (Germany) Johannes Stuck |
| 3 | R2 | (Belgium) Circuit Zolder | 11 June | No. 15 FACH AUTO TECH | No. 41 Liqui Moly Team Engstler |
| 3 | R2 | (Belgium) Circuit Zolder | 11 June | (Germany) Daniel Dobitsch (Germany) Swen Dolenc | (France) Dino Lunardi (Greece) Alexandros Margaritis |
| 4 | R1 | (Germany) Nürburgring | 9 July | No. 2 Reiter | No. 2 Reiter |
| 4 | R1 | (Germany) Nürburgring | 9 July | (Germany) Ferdinand Stuck (Germany) Johannes Stuck | (Germany) Ferdinand Stuck (Germany) Johannes Stuck |
| 4 | R2 | (Germany) Nürburgring | 10 July | No. 2 Reiter | No. 33 Heico Motorsport |
| 4 | R2 | (Germany) Nürburgring | 10 July | (Germany) Ferdinand Stuck (Germany) Johannes Stuck | (Netherlands) Christiaan Frankenhout (Germany) Andreas Wirth |
| 5 | R1 | (Austria) Red Bull Ring | 13 August | No. 2 Reiter | No. 57 MRS Team PZ Aschaffenburg |
| 5 | R1 | (Austria) Red Bull Ring | 13 August | (Germany) Ferdinand Stuck (Germany) Johannes Stuck | (Germany) Christian Engelhart (Austria) Norbert Siedler |
| 5 | R2 | (Austria) Red Bull Ring | 14 August | No. 22 MS Racing | No. 2 Reiter |
| 5 | R2 | (Austria) Red Bull Ring | 14 August | (Germany) Thomas Jäger (Germany) Florian Stoll | (Germany) Ferdinand Stuck (Germany) Johannes Stuck |
| 6 | R1 | (Germany) Lausitzring | 3 September | No. 35 Farnbacher ESET Racing | No. 10 a-workx Akrapovic |
| 6 | R1 | (Germany) Lausitzring | 3 September | (Germany) Dominik Farnbacher (Germany) Niclas Kentenich | (Germany) Michael Ammermüller (Germany) Sebastian Asch |
| 6 | R2 | (Germany) Lausitzring | 4 September | No. 28 Callaway Competition | No. 22 MS Racing |
| 6 | R2 | (Germany) Lausitzring | 4 September | (Italy) Diego Alessi (Germany) Daniel Keilwitz | (Germany) Thomas Jäger (Germany) Florian Stoll |
| 7 | R1 | (Netherlands) TT Circuit Assen | 17 September | No. 3 Team Abt Sportsline | No. 41 Liqui Moly Team Engstler |
| 7 | R1 | (Netherlands) TT Circuit Assen | 17 September | (Germany) Christopher Mies (Germany) Luca Ludwig | (France) Dino Lunardi (Greece) Alexandros Margaritis |
| 7 | R2 | (Netherlands) TT Circuit Assen | 18 September | No. 3 Team Abt Sportsline | No. 35 Farnbacher ESET Racing |
| 7 | R2 | (Netherlands) TT Circuit Assen | 18 September | (Germany) Christopher Mies (Germany) Luca Ludwig | (Germany) Dominik Farnbacher (Germany) Niclas Kentenich |
| 8 | R1 | (Germany) Hockenheimring | 1 October | No. 41 Liqui Moly Team Engstler | No. 41 Liqui Moly Team Engstler |
| 8 | R1 | (Germany) Hockenheimring | 1 October | (France) Dino Lunardi (Greece) Alexandros Margaritis | (France) Dino Lunardi (Greece) Alexandros Margaritis |
| 8 | R2 | (Germany) Hockenheimring | 2 October | No. 41 Liqui Moly Team Engstler | No. 8 Phoenix Racing Pole Promotion |
| 8 | R2 | (Germany) Hockenheimring | 2 October | (France) Dino Lunardi (Greece) Alexandros Margaritis | (Austria) Stefan Landmann (Germany) René Rast |

== Standings ==
| Pos | Driver | OSC (Germany) | | SAC (Germany) | | ZOL (Belgium) | | NÜR (Germany) | | RBR (Austria) | | LAU (Germany) | | ASS (Netherlands) | | HOC (Germany) | | Pts |
|---|---|---|---|---|---|---|---|---|---|---|---|---|---|---|---|---|---|---|
| 1 | (France) Dino Lunardi (Greece) Alexandros Margaritis | **1** | 3 | Ret | Ret | 2 | 1 | Ret | 20 | 6 | 2 | 4 | 4 | 1 | 7 | **1** | **Ret** | 189 |
| 2 | (Germany) Ferdinand Stuck (Germany) Johannes Stuck | 24 | 1 | 7 | 5 | **1** | Ret | **1** | **Ret** | **Ret** | 1 | 16 | DNS | 5 | 5 | 2 | 5 | 164 |
| 3 | (Germany) Christopher Mies | 4 | 31 | **1** | 3 | 3 | 29 | Ret | 4 | 5 | 8 | 6 | 7 | **2** | **6** | Ret | 30 | 133 |
| 4 | (Germany) Luca Ludwig | 4 | 31 | **1** | 3 | 3 | 29 | Ret | 4 | 5 | 8 | 6 | 7 | 3 | Ret | 28 | 29 | 122 |
| 5 | (Austria) Dominik Baumann (Austria) Harald Proczyk | 18 | 16 | 5 | 19 | 16 | 7 | 2 | 3 | 12 | 3 | 9 | 6 | 4 | 2 | 7 | 15 | 110 |
| 6 | (Germany) Lance David Arnold (Austria) Andreas Zuber | 5 | 21 | 17 | 23 | 4 | 24 | 24 | 8 | 2 | 7 | 5 | 3 | 32 | 3 | 5 | 8 | 104 |
| 7 | (Germany) Christer Jöns | 3 | 2 | 2 | 4 | 11 | Ret | 9 | 5 | 21 | 11 | 10 | Ret | **2** | **6** | Ret | 30 | 102 |
| 8 | (Germany) Jens Klingmann | 3 | 2 | 2 | 4 | 11 | Ret | 9 | 5 | 21 | 11 | 10 | Ret | 3 | Ret | 28 | 29 | 91 |
| 9 | (Netherlands) Christiaan Frankenhout (Germany) Andreas Wirth | 9 | 5 | 26 | Ret | 7 | 4 | 3 | 1 | 15 | 24 | 12 | Ret | 6 | 4 | 29 | 14 | 90 |
| 10 | (Germany) Niclas Kentenich | 20 | 11 | 15 | 9 | Ret | 8 | 25 | 7 | 11 | 13 | **29** | 2 | 7 | 1 | 6 | 2 | 87 |
| 11 | (Germany) Florian Stoll | 6 | 6 | 6 | 16 | 14 | 10 | Ret | 12 | 4 | **5** | 7 | 1 | 10 | Ret | 14 | 22 | 79 |
| 12 | (Germany) Philip Geipel (Germany) Albert von Thurn & Taxis | DNS | DNS | Ret | 6 | 7 | 2 | 23 | 2 | | | 17 | 11 | 14 | Ret | 4 | 4 | 72 |
| 13 | (Austria) Stefan Landmann | 8 | 10 | 28 | 2 | 9 | Ret | Ret | DNS | 8 | Ret | Ret | 25 | 11 | 9 | 3 | 1 | 71 |
| 14 | (Germany) Christopher Haase (Sweden) Andreas Simonsen | 10 | 25 | 4 | 1 | 5 | 9 | 14 | 19 | 3 | 17 | 14 | 10 | 8 | 13 | Ret | 13 | 70 |
| 15 | (Germany) René Rast | 8 | 10 | 28 | 2 | 9 | Ret | | | 8 | Ret | Ret | 25 | | | 3 | 1 | 69 |
| 16 | (Germany) Michael Ammermüller (Germany) Sebastian Asch | 11 | Ret | 3 | 8 | 10 | 27 | 4 | 10 | 7 | Ret | 1 | Ret | 16 | 21 | Ret | 11 | 64 |
| 17 | (Italy) Diego Alessi (Germany) Daniel Keilwitz | 2 | 4 | Ret | Ret | Ret | Ret | Ret | 6 | Ret | 19 | 2 | **Ret** | 21 | Ret | 18 | 6 | 64 |
| 18 | (Germany) Dominik Farnbacher | 20 | 11 | 15 | 9 | | | 25 | 7 | 11 | 13 | **29** | 2 | 7 | 1 | | | 57 |
| 19 | (Germany) Thomas Jäger | | | | | | | | | 4 | **5** | 7 | 1 | 22 | 8 | | | 57 |
| 20 | (Germany) Maximilian Götz | 31 | 24 | Ret | 7 | 13 | 11 | 6 | 18 | 14 | 20 | 13 | 8 | 10 | Ret | 8 | 3 | 38 |
| 21 | (Germany) Maximilian Mayer | 31 | 24 | Ret | 7 | 13 | 11 | 6 | 18 | 14 | 20 | 13 | 8 | Ret | 22 | 8 | 3 | 37 |
| 22 | (Germany) Kenneth Heyer | 7 | 7 | Ret | DNS | 22 | 3 | 8 | 11 | 16 | 10 | 8 | Ret | Ret | Ret | 12 | 31 | 36 |
| 23 | (Germany) Robert Renauer | 7 | 7 | Ret | DNS | 22 | 3 | 8 | 11 | 10 | 10 | 8 | Ret | | | 12 | 31 | 36 |
| 24 | (Germany) Christian Engelhart (Austria) Norbert Siedler | | | | | | | | | 1 | 9 | | | | | | | 27 |
| 26 | (Germany) Mario Farnbacher | | | | | | | | | | | | | | | 6 | 2 | 26 |
| 26 | (Germany) David Mengesdorf | 16 | 28 | 16 | 18 | 31 | 5 | 15 | 16 | | | 11 | 5 | | | 17 | 7 | 26 |
| 27 | (Russia) David Sigachev | 6 | 6 | 6 | 16 | 14 | 10 | Ret | 12 | | | | | | | | | 25 |
| 28 | (France) Nicolas Armindo | 17 | 8 | | | | | 22 | 17 | | | 3 | Ret | | | NC | 9 | 21 |
| 29 | (Germany) Stefan Wendt | 17 | 8 | | | | | | | | | 3 | Ret | | | NC | 9 | 21 |
| 30 | (Germany) Heinz-Harald Frentzen (Germany) Sven Hannawald | 19 | Ret | 13 | 17 | 21 | 15 | 11 | 29 | Ret | 4 | 22 | 9 | 18 | 19 | 9 | 16 | 16 |
| 31 | (Switzerland) Marc A. Hayek (Netherlands) Peter Kox | 12 | Ret | 10 | 12 | 15 | 19 | 5 | 9 | 24 | 15 | Ret | 18 | 13 | 12 | 15 | 10 | 14 |
| 32 | (Germany) Oliver Mayer | 14 | 9 | 19 | 20 | 30 | 14 | 16 | 15 | 13 | 6 | Ret | 13 | 22 | 8 | Ret | 25 | 14 |
| 33 | (Germany) Florian Spengler | 22 | 13 | 8 | Ret | 6 | 12 | 11 | Ret | 19 | 18 | Ret | 16 | 30 | 16 | 24 | 19 | 12 |
| 34 | (Germany) Alex Plenagl | 22 | 13 | 8 | Ret | 6 | 12 | 11 | Ret | 19 | 18 | | | | | | | 12 |
| 35 | (Germany) Dennis Vollmair | 16 | 28 | 16 | 18 | 31 | 5 | 15 | 16 | | | | | | | | | 10 |
| 36 | (Germany) Marcel Leipert | 29 | 23 | DNS | DNS | 24 | 13 | | | | | 11 | 5 | | | | | 10 |
| 37 | (Germany) Jan Seyffarth | 14 | 9 | | | 30 | 14 | 16 | 15 | 13 | 6 | Ret | 13 | | | Ret | 25 | 10 |
| 38 | (Germany) Daniel Dobitsch (Germany) Swen Dolenc | Ret | 12 | 11 | 13 | 27 | **6** | 13 | 14 | 17 | 12 | 15 | 12 | 29 | 14 | 10 | 17 | 9 |
| 39 | (Austria) Philipp Eng (Switzerland) Toni Seiler | 15 | 14 | 12 | 11 | 20 | 28 | 7 | Ret | Ret | 22 | 18 | 26 | 15 | Ret | 11 | Ret | 6 |
| 40 | (Finland) Mika Vähämäki | | | | | | | | | | | | | 19 | 15 | 17 | 7 | 6 |
| 41 | (Germany) Marco Seefried | | | | | Ret | 8 | | | | | | | | | | | 4 |
| 42 | (Netherlands) Danny van Dongen | 23 | 26 | 20 | 10 | 12 | 20 | 10 | 23 | 18 | 26 | | | 17 | 11 | 19 | 18 | 3 |
| 43 | (Germany) Frank Schmickler | 30 | 15 | 9 | 15 | 19 | 16 | Ret | DNS | | | Ret | Ret | 20 | 27 | | | 2 |
| 44 | (Germany) Charlie Geipel | 30 | 15 | 9 | 15 | 19 | 16 | Ret | DNS | | | | | | | | | 2 |
| 45 | (Sweden) Fredrik Larsson | | | | | | | | | | | 21 | 17 | 9 | Ret | 13 | 23 | 2 |
| 46 | (Sweden) Richard Göransson | | | | | | | | | | | | | 9 | Ret | 13 | 23 | 2 |
| 47 | (Germany) Tim Bergmeister | 25 | 27 | | | | | | | 9 | 14 | | | | | | | 2 |
| 48 | (Sweden) Jimmy Johansson | | | | | | | | | | | | | 11 | 9 | | | 2 |
| 49 | (Germany) Marc Basseng | | | | | | | | | 9 | 14 | | | | | | | 2 |
| 50 | (Netherlands) Ardi van der Hoek | | | | | | | 10 | 23 | 18 | 26 | | | 17 | 11 | 19 | 18 | 2 |
| 51 | (Germany) Heiko Hammel | 13 | 32 | 18 | 14 | Ret | 17 | 29 | Ret | 10 | 16 | Ret | 21 | Ret | Ret | 30 | Ret | 1 |
| 52 | (Germany) Sascha Bert | 13 | 32 | 18 | 14 | Ret | 17 | 29 | Ret | 10 | 16 | Ret | 21 | | | | | 1 |
| 53 | (Netherlands) Arjan van der Zwaan | 23 | 26 | 20 | 10 | 12 | 20 | | | | | | | | | | | 1 |
| | (Netherlands) Simon Knap | | | | | | | | | | | | | 12 | 18 | | | 0 |
| | (Netherlands) Jeroen den Boer | | | | | | | | | | | | | 12 | 18 | | | 0 |
| | (Germany) Wolfgang Hageleit | 32 | Ret | 25 | Ret | 26 | 22 | Ret | 31 | Ret | 25 | 20 | 27 | 23 | 26 | 20 | 12 | 0 |
| | (Germany) Roland Asch | | | | | | | | | Ret | 25 | 20 | 27 | 23 | 26 | 20 | 12 | 0 |
| | (Germany) Jochen Krumbach (Germany) Philipp Wlazik | | | | | | | 20 | 13 | | | | | | | | | 0 |
| | (Russia) Oleg Petrishin | 29 | 23 | 24 | 24 | 24 | 13 | DNS | DNS | 26 | 34 | 28 | 23 | 27 | 24 | 25 | 27 | 0 |
| | (Germany) Thomas Holzer (Germany) Carsten Tilke | 21 | 30 | 14 | 27 | 17 | 18 | 18 | 30 | 20 | 21 | 19 | 15 | Ret | Ret | 16 | 20 | 0 |
| | (France) Renaud Derlot | | | | | | | | | | | | | | | 14 | 22 | 0 |
| | (Germany) Otto Klohs (Germany) Jens Richter | Ret | 20 | 23 | 25 | 29 | 25 | 26 | 25 | 27 | 27 | 25 | 14 | Ret | 25 | Ret | 24 | 0 |
| | (Germany) Norman Knop | 34 | 18 | | | | | | | | | | | 19 | 15 | | | 0 |
| | (Netherlands) Tom Coronel | | | | | | | | | | | | | 30 | 16 | | | 0 |
| | (Austria) Andreas Mayerl | | | | | | | | | | | Ret | 16 | | | | | 0 |
| | (Sweden) Fredrik Lestrup | | | | | | | 19 | 17 | | | 21 | 17 | | | | | 0 |
| | (Switzerland) Pierre von Mentlen (Germany) Markus Winkelhock | | | | | | | 17 | 21 | 23 | 28 | | | Ret | 17 | Ret | Ret | 0 |
| | (Germany) Oliver Dutt | 28 | 17 | 22 | 21 | 25 | 21 | Ret | 22 | 22 | 23 | 24 | 19 | 26 | 23 | 22 | 21 | 0 |
| | (Germany) Oliver Strasser | 28 | 17 | | | | | Ret | 22 | 22 | 23 | 24 | 19 | 26 | 23 | 22 | 21 | 0 |
| | (Sweden) Lars Stugemo | | | | | | | 19 | 17 | | | | | | | | | 0 |
| | (Germany) Manuel Lauck | 34 | 18 | | | | | | | | | | | | | | | 0 |
| | (Netherlands) Michael Bleekemolen (Netherlands) Ronald van de Laar | 26 | 19 | DNS | DNS | 23 | 23 | 21 | 24 | 28 | 30 | 31 | 20 | 24 | 20 | 23 | 26 | 0 |
| | (Germany) Uwe Nittel | | | 19 | 20 | | | | | | | | | | | | | 0 |
| | (Russia) Andrey Romanov | | | | | | | | | | | | | | | 24 | 19 | 0 |
| | (France) Gilles Vannelet | | | | | | | | | | | | | 20 | 21 | | | 0 |
| | (Germany) Jürgen Häring | | | 22 | 21 | | | | | | | | | | | | | 0 |
| | (Austria) Patrick Ortlieb | | | | | 25 | 21 | | | | | | | | | | | 0 |
| | (Malaysia) Tunku Hammam Sulong (Germany) Frank Kechele | 35 | **Ret** | 21 | **Ret** | | | | | | | | | | | | | 0 |
| | (Germany) Thomas Mutsch (Denmark) Nicki Thiim | | | | | | | | | | | | | | | 21 | Ret | 0 |
| | (Germany) Florian Fritsch | 32 | Ret | 25 | Ret | 26 | 22 | Ret | 31 | | | | | | | | | 0 |
| | (Switzerland) Remo Lips | 27 | 22 | | | Ret | NC | 27 | 26 | | | | | | | | | 0 |
| | (Switzerland) Hans Hauser | 27 | 22 | | | | | | | | | | | | | | | 0 |
| | (Germany) Sven Heyrowsky | | | | | | | 22 | 27 | | | | | | | | | 0 |
| | (Germany) Heinrich Kuhn-Weiss (Germany) Christoph Schrezenmeier | | | | | | | | | 29 | 29 | 30 | 22 | | | | | 0 |
| | (Netherlands) Mike Hezemans (Netherlands) Marius Ritskes | | | Ret | 22 | | | | | | | | | | | | | 0 |
| | (Germany) Francesco Lopez | | | | | | | | | | | | | 22 | Ret | | | 0 |
| | (Germany) Tobias Neuser | | | | | | | | | | | 28 | 23 | 27 | 24 | 25 | 27 | 0 |
| | (Germany) Christian Bebion | | | | | | | | | | | 23 | Ret | 25 | Ret | | | 0 |
| | (Denmark) Michael Christensen | | | | | | | | | | | 23 | Ret | Ret | Ret | 30 | Ret | 0 |
| | (Lithuania) Andrzej Dzikevic | | | 24 | 24 | | | | | | | | | | | | | 0 |
| | (Germany) Michael Golz (Germany) Carsten Seifert | Ret | Ret | DNS | DNS | | | Ret | DNS | 31 | 33 | 26 | 24 | Ret | DNS | 27 | 28 | 0 |
| | (Germany) Jürgen Häring | 25 | 27 | | | | | | | | | | | | | | | 0 |
| | (Austria) Richard Cvörnjek (Austria) Jörg Peham | | | | | | | | | 25 | 32 | | | | | | | 0 |
| | (Canada) Kuno Wittmer | | | | | | | | | | | | | 25 | Ret | | | 0 |
| | (Germany) Freddy Kremer (Switzerland) Detlef Schmidt | 33 | 29 | 27 | 26 | 28 | 26 | 28 | 28 | | | | | | | | | 0 |
| | (Switzerland) Andre Lips | | | | | Ret | NC | 27 | 26 | | | | | | | | | 0 |
| | (Switzerland) Alfredo Saligari | | | | | | | | | | | Ret | Ret | 28 | Ret | 26 | Ret | 0 |
| | (Denmark) Ronnie Bremer | | | | | | | | | 26 | 34 | | | | | | | 0 |
| | (Germany) Wolf Silvester | | | | | | | | | | | | | | | 26 | Ret | 0 |
| | (Germany) Heiner Wackerbauer | | | | | | | | | 33 | 36 | 27 | Ret | | | | | 0 |
| | (Germany) Norbert Janz | | | | | | | | | | | 27 | Ret | | | | | 0 |
| | (Switzerland) Christoph Weber | | | | | | | | | | | | | 28 | Ret | | | 0 |
| | (Switzerland) Andrina Gugger (Switzerland) Heinz Kehl | | | | | | | | | 30 | 31 | | | | | | | 0 |
| | (Germany) Andreas Iburg (Germany) Andreas Liehm | | | | | | | | | 32 | 35 | | | | | | | 0 |
| | (United Arab Emirates) Karim Al Azhari (Austria) Martin Ragginger | | | | | | | Ret | 32 | | | | | | | | | 0 |
| | (Germany) Dietmar Haggenmüller | | | | | | | | | 33 | 36 | | | | | | | 0 |
| | (United Kingdom) Sean Edwards (Austria) Markus Fux | | | | | | | | | | | Ret | Ret | | | | | 0 |
| | (Poland) Kuba Giermaziak | | | | | | | | | | | | | Ret | Ret | | | 0 |
| | (Italy) Andrea Piccini | | | | | | | Ret | DNS | | | | | | | | | 0 |
| | (Germany) Uwe Kleen (Germany) Peter Venn | DNS | DNS | | | | | | | | | | | | | | | 0 |
| | (Germany) Steve Kirsch | | | DNS | DNS | | | | | | | | | | | | | 0 |
| | (Austria) Peter Ebner (Austria) Gottfried Grasser | | | | | | | DNS | DNS | DNS | DNS | | | | | | | 0 |
| | (Austria) Martin Karlhofer | | | | | | | DNS | DNS | | | | | | | | | 0 |
Guest drivers ineligible for points
| | (Netherlands) Duncan Huisman (Netherlands) Ricardo van der Ende | | | | | | | | | | | | | 31 | 10 | | | 0 |
| Pos | Driver | OSC (Germany) | | SAC (Germany) | | ZOL (Belgium) | | NÜR (Germany) | | RBR (Austria) | | LAU (Germany) | | ASS (Netherlands) | | HOC (Germany) | | Pts |

| Colour | Result |
|---|---|
| Gold | Winner |
| Silver | Second place |
| Bronze | Third place |
| Green | Points classification |
| Blue | Non-points classification |
| Blue | Non-classified finish (NC) |
| Purple | Retired, not classified (Ret) |
| Red | Did not qualify (DNQ) |
| Red | Did not pre-qualify (DNPQ) |
| Black | Disqualified (DSQ) |
| White | Did not start (DNS) |
| White | Withdrew (WD) |
| White | Race cancelled (C) |
| Blank | Did not practice (DNP) |
| Blank | Did not arrive (DNA) |
| Blank | Excluded (EX) |

**Bold** – Pole
Italics – Fastest Lap
