= 2010 ADAC GT Masters =

Motorsport season

Seasons
- ← 2009 2011 →

The 2010 ADAC GT Masters season was the fourth season of the ADAC GT Masters, the grand tourer-style sports car racing founded by the German automobile club ADAC. It began on 10 April at Motorsport Arena Oschersleben and finished on 3 October at the same place after seven double-header meetings. Peter Kox and Albert von Thurn & Taxis became the first drivers in this series to share the championship title.

== Entry list ==
| Team | Car | No. | Drivers | Rounds |
|---|---|---|---|---|
| (Germany) Abt Sportsline | Audi R8 LMS | 1 | (Germany) Luca Ludwig | 1–6 |
| (Germany) Abt Sportsline | Audi R8 LMS | 1 | (Germany) Christopher Mies | All |
| (Germany) Abt Sportsline | Audi R8 LMS | 1 | (Poland) Kuba Giermaziak | 7 |
| (Germany) Abt Sportsline | Audi R8 LMS | 2 | (Germany) Jens Klingmann | All |
| (Germany) Abt Sportsline | Audi R8 LMS | 2 | (Poland) Kuba Giermaziak | 1, 3–5 |
| (Germany) Abt Sportsline | Audi R8 LMS | 2 | (Germany) Frank Kechele | 2, 6 |
| (Germany) Abt Sportsline | Audi R8 LMS | 2 | (Germany) Luca Ludwig | 7 |
| (Germany) rhino's Leipert Motorsport | Ascari KZ1R GT3 | 3 | (Germany) Norman Knop | All |
| (Germany) rhino's Leipert Motorsport | Ascari KZ1R GT3 | 3 | (Germany) Roland Rehfeld | All |
| (Netherlands) aevitae Bleekemolen Racing | Porsche 997 GT3 R | 5 | (Netherlands) Ronald van de Laar | All |
| (Netherlands) aevitae Bleekemolen Racing | Porsche 997 GT3 R | 5 | (Netherlands) Michael Bleekemolen | All |
| (Germany) a-workx/Wieth Racing | Porsche 997 GT3 R | 6 | (Germany) Niclas Kentenich | All |
| (Germany) a-workx/Wieth Racing | Porsche 997 GT3 R | 6 | (Germany) Sebastian Asch | All |
| (Germany) Team Rosberg | Audi R8 LMS | 7 | (Germany) Kenneth Heyer | All |
| (Germany) Team Rosberg | Audi R8 LMS | 7 | (Germany) Michael Ammermüller | All |
| (Germany) Team Rosberg | Audi R8 LMS | 8 | (Austria) Bernd Herndlhofer | 1–6 |
| (Germany) Team Rosberg | Audi R8 LMS | 8 | (Germany) Johannes Seidlitz | 1–3 |
| (Germany) Team Rosberg | Audi R8 LMS | 8 | (Germany) Jan Seyffarth | 4 |
| (Germany) Team Rosberg | Audi R8 LMS | 8 | (Germany) Christopher Haase | 5, 7 |
| (Germany) Team Rosberg | Audi R8 LMS | 8 | (Netherlands) Christiaan Frankenhout | 6, 7 |
| (Germany) Pole Promotion | Audi R8 LMS | 9 | (Germany) Heiko Hammel | All |
| (Germany) Pole Promotion | Audi R8 LMS | 9 | (Sweden) Jimmy Johansson | 1–6 |
| (Germany) Pole Promotion | Audi R8 LMS | 9 | (Germany) René Rast | 7 |
| (Belgium) Mühlner Motorsport | Porsche 997 GT3 Cup S | 10 | (Germany) Tim Bergmeister | 1 |
| (Belgium) Mühlner Motorsport | Porsche 997 GT3 Cup S | 10 | (Germany) René Rast | 1 |
| (Belgium) Mühlner Motorsport | Porsche 997 GT3 R | 10 | (Germany) Tim Bergmeister | 2–7 |
| (Belgium) Mühlner Motorsport | Porsche 997 GT3 R | 10 | (Germany) Jörg Bergmeister | 2–4 |
| (Belgium) Mühlner Motorsport | Porsche 997 GT3 R | 10 | (Germany) Frank Schmickler | 5–7 |
| (Belgium) Mühlner Motorsport | Porsche 997 GT3 R | 11 | (Germany) Jürgen Häring | 1–4 |
| (Belgium) Mühlner Motorsport | Porsche 997 GT3 R | 11 | (Greece) Dimitrios Konstantinou | 1–4 |
| (Belgium) Mühlner Motorsport | Porsche 997 GT3 R | 11 | (Germany) Achim Winter | 7 |
| (Belgium) Mühlner Motorsport | Porsche 997 GT3 R | 11 | (Germany) Charlie Geipel | 7 |
| (Belgium) Mühlner Motorsport | Porsche 997 GT3 R | 12 | (Germany) Frank Schmickler | 1–4 |
| (Belgium) Mühlner Motorsport | Porsche 997 GT3 R | 12 | (France) Kévin Estre | 1 |
| (Belgium) Mühlner Motorsport | Porsche 997 GT3 R | 12 | (Germany) Charlie Geipel | 2 |
| (Belgium) Mühlner Motorsport | Porsche 997 GT3 R | 12 | (Germany) René Rast | 3 |
| (Belgium) Mühlner Motorsport | Porsche 997 GT3 R | 12 | (France) Antoine Leclerc | 4 |
| (Austria) s-Berg Racing | Alpina B6 GT3 | 14 | (Germany) Andreas Wirth | All |
| (Austria) s-Berg Racing | Alpina B6 GT3 | 14 | (Czech Republic) Martin Matzke | All |
| (Austria) s-Berg Racing | Alpina B6 GT3 | 15 | (Germany) Achim Winter | 1, 3–6 |
| (Austria) s-Berg Racing | Alpina B6 GT3 | 15 | (Germany) Claudia Hürtgen | 1 |
| (Austria) s-Berg Racing | Alpina B6 GT3 | 15 | (Germany) Maximilian Götz | 3 |
| (Austria) s-Berg Racing | Alpina B6 GT3 | 15 | (Netherlands) Kevin Veltmann | 4, 6 |
| (Austria) s-Berg Racing | Alpina B6 GT3 | 15 | (Czech Republic) Jaromir Jirik | 5 |
| (Germany) Need for Speed by Schubert | BMW Z4 GT3 | 16 | (Germany) Tobias Neuser | 6 |
| (Germany) Need for Speed by Schubert | BMW Z4 GT3 | 16 | (Germany) Claudia Hürtgen | 6, 7 |
| (Germany) Need for Speed by Schubert | BMW Z4 GT3 | 16 | (Sweden) Edward Sandström | 7 |
| (Germany) Need for Speed by Schubert | BMW Z4 GT3 | 17 | (Sweden) Patrick Söderlund | 6 |
| (Germany) Need for Speed by Schubert | BMW Z4 GT3 | 17 | (Sweden) Edward Sandström | 6 |
| (Germany) Need for Speed by Schubert | BMW Z4 GT3 | 17 | (Norway) Stian Sørlie | 7 |
| (Germany) Need for Speed by Schubert | BMW Z4 GT3 | 17 | (Germany) Jörg Müller | 7 |
| (Germany) Callaway Competition | Corvette Z06-R GT3 | 18 | (Switzerland) Toni Seiler | All |
| (Germany) Callaway Competition | Corvette Z06-R GT3 | 18 | (Germany) Christian Hohenadel | All |
| (Germany) Callaway Competition | Corvette Z06-R GT3 | 19 | (Austria) Augustin Eder | 1–3, 6, 7 |
| (Germany) Callaway Competition | Corvette Z06-R GT3 | 19 | (Germany) Georg Engelhardt | 1, 7 |
| (Germany) Callaway Competition | Corvette Z06-R GT3 | 19 | (Germany) Ruben Zeltner | 2 |
| (Germany) Callaway Competition | Corvette Z06-R GT3 | 19 | (Germany) Roland Hertner | 3 |
| (Germany) Callaway Competition | Corvette Z06-R GT3 | 19 | (Liechtenstein) Martin Wachter | 4 |
| (Germany) Callaway Competition | Corvette Z06-R GT3 | 19 | (Netherlands) Dennis Retera | 4, 6 |
| (Germany) Callaway Competition | Corvette Z06-R GT3 | 19 | (Switzerland) André Lips | 5 |
| (Germany) Callaway Competition | Corvette Z06-R GT3 | 19 | (Switzerland) Remo Lips | 5 |
| (Germany) Callaway Competition | Corvette Z06-R GT3 | 27 | (Germany) Sven Hannawald | All |
| (Germany) Callaway Competition | Corvette Z06-R GT3 | 27 | (Germany) Thomas Jäger | All |
| (Germany) Callaway Competition | Corvette Z06-R GT3 | 28 | (Austria) Martin Karlhofer | 2, 5, 7 |
| (Germany) Callaway Competition | Corvette Z06-R GT3 | 28 | (Germany) Sascha Bert | 2, 5, 7 |
| (Germany) Callaway Competition | Corvette Z06-R GT3 | 28 | (Netherlands) Marius Ritskes | 3, 4, 6, 7 |
| (Germany) Callaway Competition | Corvette Z06-R GT3 | 28 | (Netherlands) Jan Lammers | 3 |
| (Germany) Callaway Competition | Corvette Z06-R GT3 | 28 | (Netherlands) Bernhard van Oranje | 4 |
| (Germany) Callaway Competition | Corvette Z06-R GT3 | 28 | (Finland) Mika Salo | 6 |
| (Switzerland) Kessel Racing | Ferrari F430 Scuderia GT3 | 22 | (Germany) Freddy Kremer | 6 |
| (Switzerland) Kessel Racing | Ferrari F430 Scuderia GT3 | 22 | (Austria) Johannes Stuck | 6 |
| (Germany) Reiter Engineering | Lamborghini Gallardo LP560 GT3 | 24 | (Germany) Albert von Thurn und Taxis | All |
| (Germany) Reiter Engineering | Lamborghini Gallardo LP560 GT3 | 24 | (Netherlands) Peter Kox | All |
| (Germany) Reiter Engineering | Lamborghini Gallardo LP560 GT3 | 25 | (Germany) Ellen Lohr | 1 |
| (Germany) Reiter Engineering | Lamborghini Gallardo LP560 GT3 | 25 | (Germany) Frank Kechele | 1, 7 |
| (Germany) Reiter Engineering | Lamborghini Gallardo LP560 GT3 | 25 | (Germany) Philip Geipel | 7 |
| (Germany) Oliver Dutt | Porsche 997 GT3 Cup S | 29 | (Germany) Oliver Strasser | 3, 4, 6, 7 |
| (Germany) Oliver Dutt | Porsche 997 GT3 Cup S | 29 | (Germany) Oliver Dutt | 3, 4, 6, 7 |
| (Germany) Seyffarth Motorsport | Porsche 997 GT3 Cup | 31 | (Germany) David Jahn | 1–3 |
| (Germany) Seyffarth Motorsport | Porsche 997 GT3 Cup | 31 | (Germany) Tobias Seyffarth | 1 |
| (Germany) Seyffarth Motorsport | Porsche 997 GT3 Cup | 31 | (Russia) David Sigachev | 2 |
| (Germany) Seyffarth Motorsport | Porsche 997 GT3 Cup | 31 | (Germany) Swen Dolenc | 3 |
| (Germany) Seyffarth Motorsport | Porsche 997 GT3 Cup | 32 | (Russia) David Sigachev | 1, 3 |
| (Germany) Seyffarth Motorsport | Porsche 997 GT3 Cup | 32 | (Germany) David Mengesdorf | 1 |
| (Germany) Seyffarth Motorsport | Porsche 997 GT3 Cup | 32 | (Austria) Clemens Schmid | 3 |
| (Germany) Martin Dechent | Porsche 997 GT3 Cup | 33 | (Germany) Martin Dechent | 2–4 |
| (Germany) Martin Dechent | Porsche 997 GT3 Cup | 33 | (Germany) Jürgen Bender | 2–4 |
| (Germany) Attempto Racing | Porsche 997 GT3 Cup | 35 | (Poland) Robert Lukas | 1 |
| (Germany) Attempto Racing | Porsche 997 GT3 Cup | 35 | (France) Nicolas Armindo | 1, 3 |
| (Germany) Attempto Racing | Porsche 997 GT3 Cup | 35 | (Germany) Florian Scholze | 3 |
| (Germany) Attempto Racing | Porsche 997 GT3 Cup | 35 | (Turkey) Arkin Aka | 5 |
| (Germany) Attempto Racing | Porsche 997 GT3 Cup | 35 | (Germany) Philipp Wlazik | 5 |
| (Germany) Attempto Racing | Porsche 997 GT3 Cup | 36 | (Turkey) Arkin Aka | 1 |
| (Germany) Attempto Racing | Porsche 997 GT3 Cup | 36 | (United Kingdom) Sean Edwards | 1 |
| (Germany) Attempto Racing | Porsche 997 GT3 Cup | 36 | (Germany) Masood Azadpour | 3 |
| (Germany) Attempto Racing | Porsche 997 GT3 Cup | 36 | (Germany) Bernd Kleinbach | 3 |
| (Germany) Jola Competition | Porsche 997 GT3 Cup | 37 | (Germany) Lars Kern | 3 |
| (Germany) Jola Competition | Porsche 997 GT3 Cup | 37 | (Germany) Lance David Arnold | 3 |
| (Germany) Jola Competition | Porsche 997 GT3 Cup | 38 | (Germany) Bertram Hornung | 3 |
| (Germany) Jola Competition | Porsche 997 GT3 Cup | 38 | (Germany) Sven Herberger | 3 |
| (Germany) Dietmar Haggenmüller | Porsche 997 GT3 Cup S | 39 | (Germany) Dietmar Haggenmüller | 4–6 |
| (Germany) Dietmar Haggenmüller | Porsche 997 GT3 Cup S | 39 | (Germany) Dominik Neumeyer | 4 |
| (Germany) Dietmar Haggenmüller | Porsche 997 GT3 Cup S | 39 | (France) Nicolas Armindo | 5 |
| (Germany) Dietmar Haggenmüller | Porsche 997 GT3 Cup S | 39 | (Germany) Marco Seefried | 6 |
| (Germany) Vulkan Racing | Dodge Viper Competition Coupe | 42 | (Germany) Christopher Brück | 6, 7 |
| (Germany) Vulkan Racing | Dodge Viper Competition Coupe | 42 | (Germany) Wolfgang Kaufmann | 6 |
| (Germany) Vulkan Racing | Dodge Viper Competition Coupe | 42 | (Germany) Marc Basseng | 7 |
| (Germany) Chrzanowski Racing | Porsche 997 GT3 Cup | 43 | (Germany) Robin Chrzanowski | 6 |
| (Germany) Chrzanowski Racing | Porsche 997 GT3 Cup | 43 | (Germany) Dominic Fuchs | 6 |
| (Germany) MRS Racing | Porsche 997 GT3 Cup | 45 | (Turkey) Yadel Oskan | 7 |
| (Germany) MRS Racing | Porsche 997 GT3 Cup | 45 | (Turkey) Yucel Ozbek | 7 |
| (Germany) Michael Illbruck | Porsche 997 GT3 R | 46 | (Germany) Michael Illbruck | 7 |
| (Germany) Michael Illbruck | Porsche 997 GT3 R | 46 | (Germany) Manuel Lauck | 7 |
| (Germany) Bliss Autosport | Porsche 997 GT3 Cup | 47 | (Germany) Jens Richter | 7 |
| (Germany) Bliss Autosport | Porsche 997 GT3 Cup | 47 | (Germany) Otto Klohs | 7 |

== Race calendar and results ==
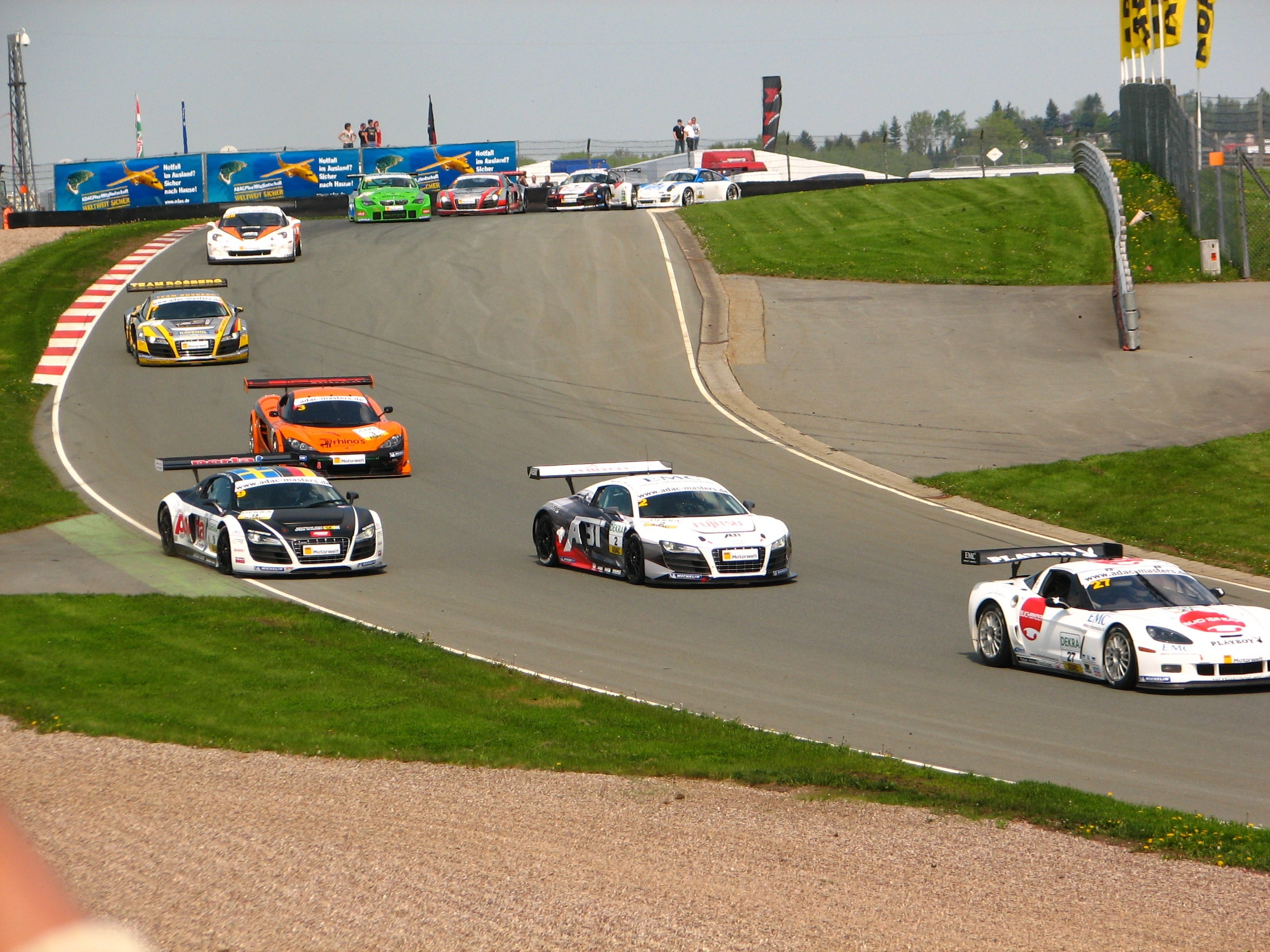
The second race at Sachsenring.

| Round | | Circuit | Date | Pole | Winner |
|---|---|---|---|---|---|
| 1 | R1 | (Germany) Motorsport Arena Oschersleben | 10 April | No. 14 s-Berg Racing | No. 6 A-Workx/Wieth Racing |
| 1 | R1 | (Germany) Motorsport Arena Oschersleben | 10 April | (Czech Republic) Martin Matzke (Germany) Andreas Wirth | (Germany) Sebastian Asch (Germany) Niclas Kentenich |
| 1 | R2 | (Germany) Motorsport Arena Oschersleben | 11 April | No. 27 Callaway Competition | No. 10 Mühlner Motorsport |
| 1 | R2 | (Germany) Motorsport Arena Oschersleben | 11 April | (Germany) Sven Hannawald (Germany) Thomas Jäger | (Germany) Tim Bergmeister (Germany) René Rast |
| 2 | R1 | (Germany) Sachsenring | 8 May | No. 1 Abt Sportsline | No. 24 Reiter Engineering |
| 2 | R1 | (Germany) Sachsenring | 8 May | (Germany) Christopher Mies (Germany) Luca Ludwig | (Netherlands) Peter Kox (Germany) Albert von Thurn & Taxis |
| 2 | R2 | (Germany) Sachsenring | 9 May | No. 1 Abt Sportsline | No. 1 Abt Sportsline |
| 2 | R2 | (Germany) Sachsenring | 9 May | (Germany) Christopher Mies (Germany) Luca Ludwig | (Germany) Christopher Mies (Germany) Luca Ludwig |
| 3 | R1 | (Germany) Hockenheimring | 29 May | No. 6 A-Workx/Wieth Racing | No. 10 Mühlner Motorsport |
| 3 | R1 | (Germany) Hockenheimring | 29 May | (Germany) Sebastian Asch (Germany) Niclas Kentenich | (Germany) Jörg Bergmeister (Germany) Tim Bergmeister |
| 3 | R2 | (Germany) Hockenheimring | 30 May | No. 18 Callaway Competition | No. 24 Reiter Engineering |
| 3 | R2 | (Germany) Hockenheimring | 30 May | (Germany) Christian Hohenadel (Switzerland) Toni Seiler | (Netherlands) Peter Kox (Germany) Albert von Thurn & Taxis |
| 4 | R1 | (Netherlands) TT Circuit Assen | 17 July | No. 2 Abt Sportsline | No. 1 Abt Sportsline |
| 4 | R1 | (Netherlands) TT Circuit Assen | 17 July | (Poland) Kuba Giermaziak (Germany) Jens Klingmann | (Germany) Christopher Mies (Germany) Luca Ludwig |
| 4 | R2 | (Netherlands) TT Circuit Assen | 18 July | No. 1 Abt Sportsline | No. 2 Abt Sportsline |
| 4 | R2 | (Netherlands) TT Circuit Assen | 18 July | (Germany) Christopher Mies (Germany) Luca Ludwig | (Poland) Kuba Giermaziak (Germany) Jens Klingmann |
| 5 | R1 | (Germany) EuroSpeedway Lausitz | 14 August | No. 24 Reiter Engineering | No. 24 Reiter Engineering |
| 5 | R1 | (Germany) EuroSpeedway Lausitz | 14 August | (Netherlands) Peter Kox (Germany) Albert von Thurn & Taxis | (Netherlands) Peter Kox (Germany) Albert von Thurn & Taxis |
| 5 | R2 | (Germany) EuroSpeedway Lausitz | 15 August | No. 24 Reiter Engineering | No. 24 Reiter Engineering |
| 5 | R2 | (Germany) EuroSpeedway Lausitz | 15 August | (Netherlands) Peter Kox (Germany) Albert von Thurn & Taxis | (Netherlands) Peter Kox (Germany) Albert von Thurn & Taxis |
| 6 | R1 | (Germany) Nürburgring | 28 August | No. 14 s-Berg Racing | No. 14 s-Berg Racing |
| 6 | R1 | (Germany) Nürburgring | 28 August | (Czech Republic) Martin Matzke (Germany) Andreas Wirth | (Czech Republic) Martin Matzke (Germany) Andreas Wirth |
| 6 | R2 | (Germany) Nürburgring | 29 August | No. 24 Reiter Engineering | No. 14 s-Berg Racing |
| 6 | R2 | (Germany) Nürburgring | 29 August | (Netherlands) Peter Kox (Germany) Albert von Thurn & Taxis | (Czech Republic) Martin Matzke (Germany) Andreas Wirth |
| 7 | R1 | (Germany) Motorsport Arena Oschersleben | 2 October | No. 1 Abt Sportsline | No. 1 Abt Sportsline |
| 7 | R1 | (Germany) Motorsport Arena Oschersleben | 2 October | (Poland) Kuba Giermaziak (Germany) Christopher Mies | (Poland) Kuba Giermaziak (Germany) Christopher Mies |
| 7 | R2 | (Germany) Motorsport Arena Oschersleben | 3 October | No. 24 Reiter Engineering | No. 2 Abt Sportsline |
| 7 | R2 | (Germany) Motorsport Arena Oschersleben | 3 October | (Netherlands) Peter Kox (Germany) Albert von Thurn & Taxis | (Germany) Jens Klingmann (Germany) Luca Ludwig |

== Standings ==
| Pos | Driver | OSC (Germany) | | SAC (Germany) | | HOC (Germany) | | ASS (Netherlands) | | LAU (Germany) | | NÜR (Germany) | | OSC (Germany) | | Pts |
|---|---|---|---|---|---|---|---|---|---|---|---|---|---|---|---|---|
| 1 | (Netherlands) Peter Kox (Germany) Albert von Thurn & Taxis | 4 | 6 | 1 | 6 | 2 | 1 | 8 | 6 | **1** | **1** | Ret | **5** | 2 | **2** | 83 |
| 2 | (Germany) Christopher Mies | 8 | Ret | **2** | **1** | 7 | Ret | 1 | **3** | 2 | 7 | 2 | 6 | **1** | 9 | 70 |
| 3 | (Germany) Luca Ludwig | 8 | Ret | **2** | **1** | 7 | Ret | 1 | **3** | 2 | 7 | 2 | 6 | 12 | 1 | 68 |
| 4 | (Germany) Tim Bergmeister | 18 | 1 | 5 | 8 | 1 | 3 | Ret | 16 | 10 | 2 | 19 | 4 | 6 | 3 | 53 |
| 5 | (Germany) Jens Klingmann | 6 | 2 | 11 | 9 | 8 | 8 | **Ret** | 1 | 3 | 8 | 6 | 7 | 12 | 1 | 45 |
| 6 | (Czech Republic) Martin Matzke (Germany) Andreas Wirth | **7** | 4 | 9 | 4 | 21 | 5 | 2 | Ret | NC | Ret | **1** | 1 | 14 | Ret | 44 |
| 7 | (Germany) Sebastian Asch (Germany) Niclas Kentenich | 1 | 3 | 15 | 15 | **4** | Ret | 5 | 8 | 9 | 5 | 3 | 2 | DNS | DSQ | 44 |
| 8 | (Poland) Kuba Giermaziak | 6 | 2 | | | 8 | 8 | **Ret** | 1 | 3 | 8 | | | **1** | 9 | 42 |
| 9 | (Germany) Frank Schmickler | 2 | Ret | 8 | 5 | Ret | 4 | 7 | 11 | 10 | 2 | 19 | 4 | 6 | 3 | 42 |
| 10 | (Germany) Heiko Hammel | 5 | 8 | 6 | 7 | Ret | 9 | 4 | 2 | 4 | Ret | 20 | Ret | 4 | Ret | 33 |
| 11 | (Sweden) Jimmy Johansson | 5 | 8 | 6 | 7 | Ret | 9 | 4 | 2 | 4 | Ret | 20 | Ret | | | 28 |
| 12 | (Germany) Michael Ammermüller (Germany) Kenneth Heyer | 10 | 9 | 7 | 16 | 6 | 7 | 9 | 10 | 5 | 9 | 4 | 8 | 3 | 4 | 28 |
| 13 | (Germany) Norman Knop (Germany) Roland Rehfeld | 11 | 5 | 3 | Ret | 3 | Ret | 3 | Ret | DNS | DNS | 7 | 11 | Ret | 7 | 27 |
| 14 | (Germany) Christian Hohenadel (Switzerland) Toni Seiler | 3 | 7 | Ret | DNS | 16 | **11** | 10 | 7 | 11 | 3 | 8 | 3 | 7 | 10 | 26 |
| 15 | (Germany) Sven Hannawald (Germany) Thomas Jäger | Ret | **10** | 10 | 2 | 5 | 2 | 6 | 9 | 8 | 10 | 9 | 15 | Ret | Ret | 24 |
| 16 | (Germany) Jörg Bergmeister | | | 5 | 8 | 1 | 3 | Ret | 16 | | | | | | | 21 |
| 17 | (Germany) René Rast | 18 | 1 | | | Ret | 4 | | | | | | | 4 | Ret | 20 |
| 18 | (Germany) Sascha Bert (Austria) Martin Karlhofer | | | 4 | 3 | | | | | 7 | 6 | | | Ret | Ret | 16 |
| = | (Austria) Bernd Herndlhofer | 9 | 18 | Ret | Ret | 10 | 6 | 14 | 4 | 6 | 4 | Ret | 9 | | | 16 |
| 19 | (Germany) Christopher Haase | | | | | | | | | 6 | 4 | | | 5 | Ret | 12 |
| 20 | (Germany) Frank Kechele | 15 | Ret | 11 | 9 | | | | | | | 6 | 7 | Ret | 6 | 9 |
| 21 | (France) Kévin Estre | 2 | Ret | | | | | | | | | | | | | 8 |
| 22 | (Germany) Charly Geipel | 11 | 11 | 8 | 5 | | | | | | | | | 11 | Ret | 6 |
| 23 | (Germany) Jan Seyffarth | | | | | | | 14 | 4 | | | | | | | 5 |
| 24 | (Germany) Achim Winter | 12 | 17 | | | 12 | Ret | 17 | 5 | 12 | 11 | Ret | 13 | 11 | Ret | 5 |
| 25 | (Netherlands) Christiaan Frankenhout | | | | | | | | | | | Ret | 9 | 5 | Ret | 4 |
| 26 | (Netherlands) Marius Ritskes | | | | | 11 | Ret | 12 | Ret | | | 5 | 16 | | | 4 |
| 27 | (Netherlands) Kevin Veltmaan | | | | | | | 17 | 5 | | | Ret | 13 | | | 4 |
| 28 | (Finland) Mika Salo | | | | | | | | | | | 5 | 16 | | | 4 |
| 29 | (Germany) Philip Geipel | | | | | | | | | | | | | Ret | 6 | 4 |
| 30 | (Germany) Johannes Seidlitz | 9 | 18 | Ret | Ret | 10 | 6 | | | | | | | | | 3 |
| 31 | (France) Antoine Leclerc | | | | | | | 7 | 11 | | | | | | | 2 |
| | (Netherlands) Michael Bleekemolen (Netherlands) Ronald van de Laar | 14 | 12 | 12 | 12 | 9 | Ret | 11 | 13 | 16 | 12 | 14 | 20 | DNS | 11 | 0 |
| | (Austria) Augustin Eder | Ret | Ret | 13 | 10 | 15 | 17 | | | | | 12 | Ret | 15 | 13 | 0 |
| | (France) Nicolas Armindo | 13 | 13 | | | Ret | 10 | | | 14 | Ret | | | | | 0 |
| | (Germany) Ruben Zeltner | | | 13 | 10 | | | | | | | | | | | 0 |
| | (Sweden) Patrick Söderlund | | | | | | | | | | | 15 | 10 | | | 0 |
| | (Germany) Florian Scholze | | | | | Ret | 10 | | | | | | | | | 0 |
| | (Germany) Wolfgang Kaufmann | | | | | | | | | | | 10 | Ret | | | 0 |
| | (Germany) Jürgen Häring (Greece) Dimitrios Konstantinou | 19 | 11 | Ret | 11 | 13 | Ret | 18 | 12 | | | | | | | 0 |
| | (Czech Republic) Jaromir Jirik | | | | | | | | | 12 | 11 | | | | | 0 |
| | (Germany) Freddy Kremer (Austria) Johannes Stuck | | | | | | | | | | | 11 | 12 | | | 0 |
| | (Netherlands) Jan Lammers | | | | | 11 | Ret | | | | | | | | | 0 |
| | (Russia) David Sigachev | Ret | 15 | 14 | 13 | 18 | 12 | | | | | | | | | 0 |
| | (Germany) Oliver Dutt (Germany) Oliver Strasser | | | | | 14 | Ret | 13 | Ret | | | 16 | 17 | 16 | 12 | 0 |
| | (Austria) Clemens Schmid | | | | | 18 | 12 | | | | | | | | | 0 |
| | (Netherlands) Dennis Retera | | | | | | | Ret | Ret | | | 12 | Ret | | | 0 |
| | (Germany) Maximilian Götz | | | | | 12 | Ret | | | | | | | | | 0 |
| | (Netherlands) Bernhard van Oranje | | | | | | | 12 | Ret | | | | | | | 0 |
| | (Germany) David Jahn | 17 | 16 | 14 | 13 | Ret | 13 | | | | | | | | | 0 |
| | (Poland) Robert Lukas | 13 | 13 | | | | | | | | | | | | | 0 |
| | (Switzerland) Andre Lips (Switzerland) Remo Lips | | | | | | | | | 13 | 13 | | | | | 0 |
| | (Germany) Georg Engelhardt | Ret | Ret | | | | | | | | | | | 15 | 13 | 0 |
| | (Germany) Tobias Neuser | | | | | | | | | | | 13 | 18 | | | 0 |
| | (Germany) Swen Dolenc | | | | | Ret | 13 | | | | | | | | | 0 |
| | (Germany) Dietmar Haggenmüller | | | | | | | 16 | 14 | 14 | Ret | 17 | 14 | | | 0 |
| | (Turkey) Armin Aka | 16 | 14 | | | | | | | 15 | 14 | | | | | 0 |
| | (Germany) Jürgen Bender | | | 16 | 14 | 20 | 15 | 15 | 15 | | | | | | | 0 |
| | (Germany) Martin Dechent | | | 16 | 14 | 20 | 15 | 15 | 15 | | | | | | | 0 |
| | (Germany) Philip Wlazik | | | | | | | | | 15 | 14 | | | | | 0 |
| | (United Kingdom) Sean Edwards | 16 | 14 | | | | | | | | | | | | | 0 |
| | (Germany) Dominik Neumeyer | | | | | | | 16 | 14 | | | | | | | 0 |
| | (Germany) Lance David Arnold (Germany) Lars Kern | | | | | 17 | 14 | | | | | | | | | 0 |
| | (Germany) Marco Seefried | | | | | | | | | | | 17 | 14 | | | 0 |
| | (Germany) Roland Hertner | | | | | 15 | 17 | | | | | | | | | 0 |
| | (Germany) Ellen Lohr | 15 | Ret | | | | | | | | | | | | | 0 |
| | (Germany) David Mengesdorf | Ret | 15 | | | | | | | | | | | | | 0 |
| | (Germany) Tobias Seyffarth | 17 | 16 | | | | | | | | | | | | | 0 |
| | (Germany) Sven Herberger (Germany) Bertram Hornung | | | | | 19 | 16 | | | | | | | | | 0 |
| | (Germany) Robin Chrzanowski (Germany) Dominic Fuchs | | | | | | | | | | | 18 | 19 | | | 0 |
| | (Germany) Masood Azadpour (Germany) Bernd Kleinbach | | | | | 22 | 18 | | | | | | | | | 0 |
| | (Liechtenstein) Martin Wachter | | | | | | | Ret | Ret | | | | | | | 0 |
Guest drivers ineligible for points
| | (Germany) Claudia Hürtgen | 12 | 17 | | | | | | | | | 13 | 18 | 9 | 5 | 0 |
| | (Sweden) Edward Sandström | | | | | | | | | | | 15 | 10 | 9 | 5 | 0 |
| | (Germany) Christopher Brück | | | | | | | | | | | 10 | Ret | 8 | 16 | 0 |
| | (Germany) Jörg Müller (Norway) Stian Sørlie | | | | | | | | | | | | | 10 | 8 | 0 |
| | (Germany) Marc Basseng | | | | | | | | | | | | | 8 | 16 | 0 |
| | (Germany) Michael Illbruck (Germany) Manuel Lauck | | | | | | | | | | | | | 12 | Ret | 0 |
| | (Germany) Otto Klohs (Germany) Jens Richter | | | | | | | | | | | | | 17 | 14 | 0 |
| | (Turkey) Yadel Oskan (Turkey) Yucel Ozbek | | | | | | | | | | | | | 18 | 15 | 0 |
| Pos | Driver | OSC (Germany) | | SAC (Germany) | | HOC (Germany) | | ASS (Netherlands) | | LAU (Germany) | | NÜR (Germany) | | OSC (Germany) | | Pts |

| Colour | Result |
|---|---|
| Gold | Winner |
| Silver | Second place |
| Bronze | Third place |
| Green | Points classification |
| Blue | Non-points classification |
| Blue | Non-classified finish (NC) |
| Purple | Retired, not classified (Ret) |
| Red | Did not qualify (DNQ) |
| Red | Did not pre-qualify (DNPQ) |
| Black | Disqualified (DSQ) |
| White | Did not start (DNS) |
| White | Withdrew (WD) |
| White | Race cancelled (C) |
| Blank | Did not practice (DNP) |
| Blank | Did not arrive (DNA) |
| Blank | Excluded (EX) |

**Bold** – Pole
Italics – Fastest Lap
