= Luca Ludwig =

German racing driver

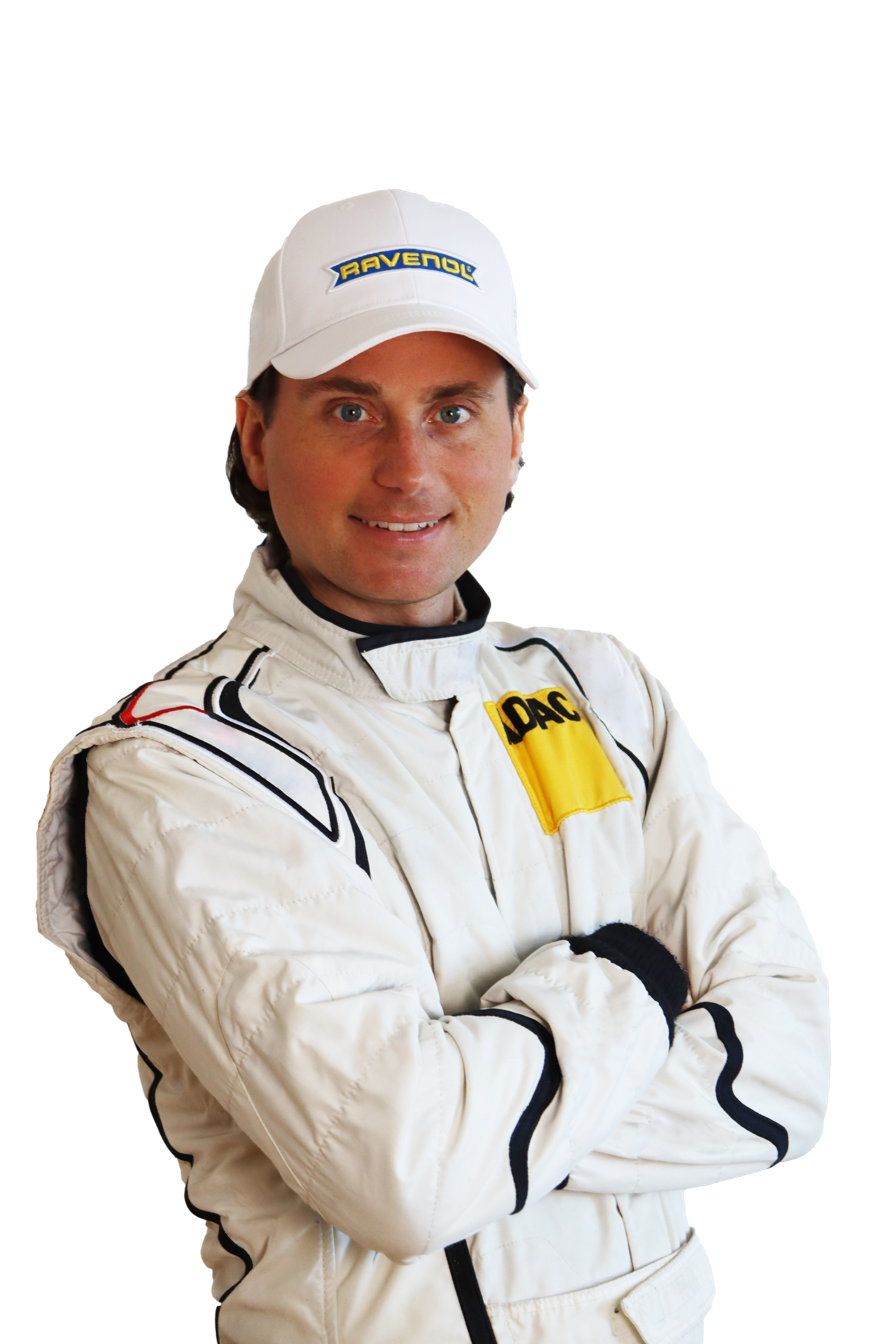
- Ludwig in 2022
- Nationality: (Germany) German
- Born: 4 November 1988 (age 38) Bonn, West Germany
- Relatives: Klaus Ludwig (father)

ADAC GT Masters
- Categorisation: FIA Silver (until 2015); FIA Gold (2016–)
- Years active: 2009–2019
- Teams: Callaway Competition; Abt Sportsline; Gemballa Racing; Polarweiss Racing; Zakspeed; HB Racing
- Starts: 141
- Wins: 12
- Poles: 7
- Fastest laps: 8
- Best finish: 1st in 2015

Previous series
- 2009 2012–2014, 2016–2017, 2019–2021, 2023 2012–2013, 2016–2018 2018 2021: FIA GT3 European Championship; Nürburgring Endurance Series Blancpain Endurance Series V de V Endurance Series – LMP3; Ferrari Challenge Europe – Trofeo Pirelli

Championship titles
- 2015: ADAC GT Masters

Luca Ludwig (born 4 November 1988 in Bonn) is a German racing driver. He was champion of the ADAC GT Masters in 2015 and is the son of former Deutsche Tourenwagen Meisterschaft champion and 24 Hours of Le Mans and Nürburgring 24 Hours winner Klaus Ludwig.

== Racing record ==
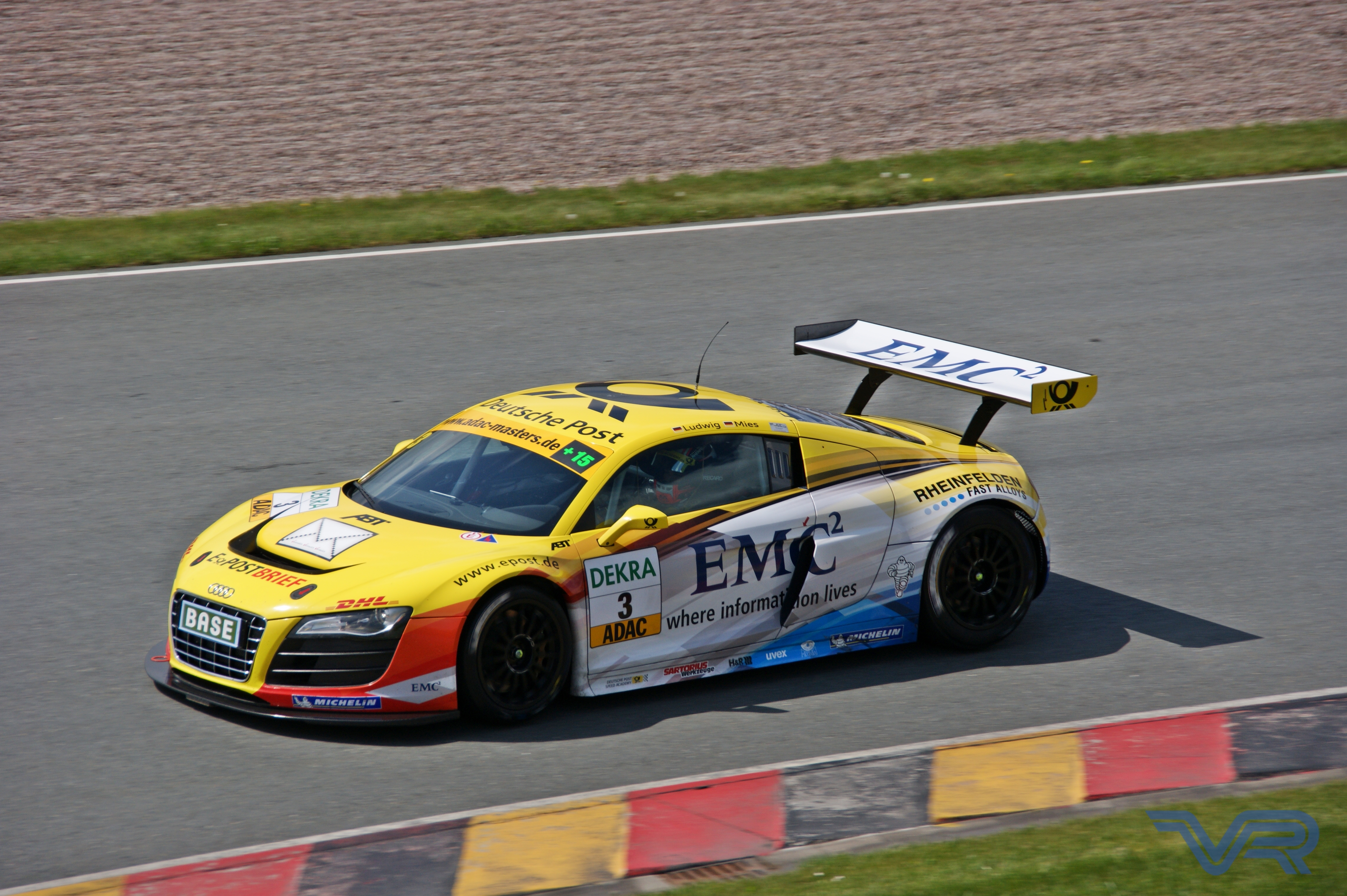
Ludwig sharing an Audi R8 LMS ultra with Christopher Mies at the Sachsenring round of the 2011 ADAC GT Masters.

=== Career summary ===
Season	Series	Team	Races	Wins	Poles	F/Laps	Podiums	Points	Position
2009	FIA GT3 European Championship	Marc Sourd Racing	4	0	0	0	1	11	17th
2009	ADAC GT Masters	Callaway Competition	14	3	1	2	6	67	**2nd**
2009	24 Hours of Nürburgring - SP6	Dörr Motorsport	1	1	?	?	1	N/A	**1st**
2010	ADAC GT Masters	Abt Sportsline	14	3	1	1	7	68	**3rd**
2010	24 Hours of Nürburgring - SP9	Phoenix Racing	1	1	0	0	1	N/A	**1st**
2011	ADAC GT Masters	Abt Sportsline	16	1	1	0	4	122	4th
2011	24 Hours of Nürburgring - SP9	Audi Sport Team Abt Sportsline	1	0	?	?	0	N/A	8th
2012	ADAC GT Masters	Gemballa Racing	8	0	0	0	0	0	NC
2012	Blancpain Endurance Series - Pro	Audi Sport Team Phoenix	1	0	0	0	0	2	26th
2012	VLN Series - SP9	Phoenix Racing	?	?	?	?	2	?	?
2012	24 Hours of Nürburgring - SP9	Räder Motorsport	1	0	0	0	0	N/A	DNF
2013	ADAC GT Masters	Polarweiss Racing	2	0	0	0	0	0	NC
2013	Blancpain Endurance Series - Pro	HTP Motorsport	1	0	0	0	0	16	19th
2013	Blancpain Endurance Series - Pro	Black Falcon	1	0	0	0	0	16	19th
2013	VLN Series - SP9	Phoenix Racing	1	0	?	?	0	0	NC
2013	VLN Series - SP9	G-Drive Racing by Phoenix	1	0	?	?	0	0	NC
2013	24 Hours of Nürburgring - SP9	G-Drive Racing by Phoenix	1	0	0	0	0	N/A	8th
2014	VLN Series - SP9	Abt Sportsline	1	0	0	0	0	0	NC
2014	ADAC GT Masters	BKK Mobil Oil Racing Team Zakspeed	15	0	1	1	2	80	11th
2015	ADAC GT Masters	Team Zakspeed	16	3	1	1	7	199	**1st**
2015	24 Hours of Nürburgring - SP9	Team Zakspeed	1	0	0	0	0	N/A	DNF
2016	ADAC GT Masters	AMG - Team Zakspeed	14	2	2	2	4	110	6th
2016	Blancpain GT Series Endurance Cup	Zakspeed	1	0	0	0	0	0	NC
2016	VLN Series - SP9	Zakspeed	2	0	0	0	0	0	NC
2016	24 Hours of Nürburgring - SP9	Mann Filter Team Zakspeed	1	0	0	0	0	N/A	6th
2017	ADAC GT Masters	Team Zakspeed	14	0	0	1	3	87	11th
2017	Blancpain GT Series Endurance Cup	Team Zakspeed	1	0	0	0	0	0	NC
2017	VLN Series - SPX	HTP Motorsport	1	0	0	0	1	?	?
2018	Blancpain GT Series Endurance Cup	Rinaldi Racing	1	0	0	0	0	0	NC
2018	Blancpain GT Series Endurance Cup	HB Racing	1	0	0	0	0	0	NC
2018	Blancpain GT Series Endurance Cup - Pro-Am	Rinaldi Racing	1	0	0	0	0	10	22nd
2018	Blancpain GT Series Endurance Cup - Pro-Am	HB Racing	1	0	0	0	0	10	22nd
2018	V de V Endurance Series - LMP3	Inter Europol Competition	1	0	0	0	0	0	NC
2018	ADAC GT Masters	HB Racing	14	0	0	0	1	46	12th
2019	ADAC GT Masters	HB Racing	14	0	0	0	0	67	15th
2019	VLN Series - SP9	GetSpeed Performance	1	0	0	0	0	2.62	94th
2019	24 Hours of Nürburgring - SP9	GetSpeed Performance	1	0	0	0	0	N/A	6th
2020	Nürburgring Endurance Series - SP9	Octane126	4	0	0	0	1	16.98	27th
2020	24 Hours of Nürburgring - SP9	Octane126	1	0	0	0	0	N/A	DNF
2021	Ferrari Challenge Europe - Trofeo Pirelli (Pro)	Octane126	6	0	0	0	2	47	7th
2021	Nürburgring Endurance Series - SP9	Octane126	1	0	0	0	0	3.26	13th
2021	24 Hours of Nürburgring - SP9	Octane126	1	0	0	0	0	N/A	DNF
2022	24 Hours of Nürburgring - SP9	Octane126	1	0	0	0	0	N/A	DNF
2023	Nürburgring Endurance Series - SP9	Racing One; Konrad Motorsport	1	1	0	0	1	?	?
2023	GT Cup Open Europe	Mertel Motorsport	7	0	0	0	0	7	23rd
2023	24 Hours of Nürburgring - SP9	racing one	1	0	0	0	0	N/A	15th
2024	GT Cup Open Europe	Mertel Motorsport							
2024	Ferrari Challenge Europe - Trofeo Pirelli (Pro)	Mertel Motorsport	12	2	3	3	5	90	4th
2024	Nürburgring Langstrecken-Serie - SP9	Frikadelli Racing Team							
2024	24 Hours of Nürburgring - SP9	Frikadelli Racing Team	1	0	0	0	0	N/A	12th
2024	International GT Open	racing one	5	0	0	0	0	5	28th
2025	GT Winter Series - Cup 1	Mertel Motorsport							
2025	International GT Open	Mertel Motorsport	5	0	0	0	0	0	48th
2025	Nürburgring Langstrecken-Serie - SP9	Scherer Sport PHX							
2025	24 Hours of Nürburgring - SP9	Scherer Sport PHX	1	0	0	0	0	N/A	DNF
2026	Nürburgring Langstrecken-Serie - SP-X	HWA Engineering Speed							

=== Complete ADAC GT Masters results ===
(key) (Races in bold indicate pole position) (Races in italics indicate fastest lap)

Year	Team	Car	1	2	3	4	5	6	7	8	9	10	11	12	13	14	15	16	DC	Points
2009	Callaway Competition	Corvette Z06.R GT3	**OSC1**; **1**; 1	OSC1; 2; 1	ASS; 1; 8	ASS; 2 Ret	HOC; 1; 5	HOC; 2; 9	LAU; 1; 4	LAU; 2; 6	NÜR; 1; 2	**NÜR**; **2**; 1	SAC; 1; 2	SAC; 2 Ret	OSC2; 1 Ret	OSC2; 2; 3			2nd	67
2010	Abt Sportsline	Audi R8 LMS	OSC; 1; 8	OSC; 2 Ret	**SAC**; **1**; 2	**SAC**; **2**; 1	HOC; 1; 7	HOC; 2 Ret	ASS; 1; 1	**ASS**; **2**; 3	LAU; 1; 2	LAU; 2; 7	NÜR; 1; 2	NÜR; 2; 6	OSC; 1; 12	OSC; 2; 1			3rd	68
2011	Abt Sportsline	Audi R8 LMS	OSC; 1; 4	OSC; 2; 31	**SAC**; **1**; 1	SAC; 2; 3	ZOL; 1; 3	ZOL; 2; 29	NÜR; 1 Ret	NÜR; 2; 4	RBR; 1; 5	RBR; 2; 8	LAU; 1; 6	LAU; 2; 7	ASS; 1; 3	ASS; 2 Ret	HOC; 1; 28	HOC; 2; 29	4th	122
2012	Gemballa Racing	McLaren MP4-12C GT3	OSC; 1; 11	OSC; 2; 29	ZAN; 1; 21	ZAN; 2 Ret	SAC; 1 Ret	SAC; 2; 20											NC	0
2012	Prosperia uhc speed	Audi R8 LMS							NÜR; 1; 29	NÜR; 2 Ret	RBR; 1	RBR; 2	LAU; 1	LAU; 2	NÜR; 1	NÜR; 2	HOC; 1	HOC; 2	NC	0
2013	Polarweiss Racing	Mercedes-Benz SLS AMG GT3	OSC; 1	OSC; 2	SPA; 1	SPA; 2	SAC; 1	SAC; 2	NÜR; 1	NÜR; 2	RBR; 1	RBR; 2	LAU; 1	LAU; 2	SVK; 1	SVK; 2	HOC; 1; 9	HOC; 2; 12	NC†	0†
2014	BKK Mobil Oil Racing Team Zakspeed	Mercedes-Benz SLS AMG GT3	OSC; 1; 11	OSC; 2; 8	ZAN; 1; 24	ZAN; 2 DSQ	LAU; 1; 5	LAU; 2; 21	RBR; 1; 7	RBR; 2; 6	SLO; 1; 9	SLO; 2; 7	**NÜR**; **1**; 2	NÜR; 2; 8	SAC; 1 Ret	SAC; 2; 18	**HOC**; **1**; 2	HOC; 2; 9	11th	80
2015	Team Zakspeed	Mercedes-Benz SLS AMG GT3	OSC; 1; 2	OSC; 2; 2	RBR; 1; 3	RBR; 2; 4	**SPA**; **1**; 2	SPA; 2; 1	LAU; 1; 4	**LAU**; **2**; 1	NÜR; 1; 9	NÜR; 2; 10	SAC; 1; 5	SAC; 2; 17	ZAN; 1; 1	ZAN; 2; 11	HOC; 1 Ret	HOC; 2; 5	1st	199
2016	AMG - Team Zakspeed	Mercedes-AMG GT3	OSC; 1; 1	**OSC**; **2**; 22	SAC; 1; 1	**SAC**; **2**; 8	LAU; 1; 32	LAU; 2; 24	RBR; 1; 5	RBR; 2; 3	NÜR; 1; 17	NÜR; 2; 5	ZAN; 1 Ret	ZAN; 2; 3	HOC; 1; 7	HOC; 2; 12			6th	110
2017	Mercedes-AMG Team Zakspeed	Mercedes-AMG GT3	OSC; 1; 8	OSC; 2; 8	**LAU**; **1**; 2	LAU; 2; 17	RBR; 1; 5	RBR; 2; 6	ZAN; 1; 5	ZAN; 2; 10	**NÜR**; **1**; 3	NÜR; 2; 11	SAC; 1 DSQ	SAC; 2 DSQ					11th	87
2017	Team Zakspeed	Mercedes-AMG GT3													HOC; 1; 3	HOC; 2; 9			11th	87
2018	HB Racing	Ferrari 488 GT3	OSC; 1; 16	OSC; 2; 3	MST; 1 Ret	MST; 2; 4	RBR; 1; 7	RBR; 2 Ret	NÜR; 1; 9	NÜR; 2; 13	ZAN; 1; 22	ZAN; 2; 14	SAC; 1; 10	SAC; 2 Ret	HOC; 1; 7	HOC; 2; 8			12th	46
2019	HB Racing	Ferrari 488 GT3	OSC; 1; 10	OSC; 2; 15	MST; 1; 11	MST; 2; 8	RBR; 1; 10	RBR; 2 Ret	ZAN; 1; 16	ZAN; 2; 12	NÜR; 1; 7	NÜR; 2; 4	HOC; 1; 21	HOC; 2; 18	SAC; 1; 15	SAC; 2; 7			15th	67

=== Complete Nürburgring 24 Hours results ===
Year	Team	Co-Drivers	Car	Class	Laps	Pos.	Class Pos.
2009	(Germany) Dörr Motorsport	(Germany) Rudi Adams (Germany) Markus Grossmann (Germany) Arnd Meier	BMW Z4 M Coupé	SP6	145	10th	**1st**
2010	(Germany) Phoenix Racing GmbH	(Germany) Marc Bronzel (Germany) Dennis Rostek (Germany) Markus Winkelhock	Audi R8 LMS	SP9	153	**3rd**	**1st**
2011	(Germany) Audi Sport Team Abt Sportsline	(Germany) Christian Abt (Germany) Christer Jöns (Germany) Christopher Mies	Audi R8 LMS	SP9	149	12th	8th
2012	(Germany) Raeder Motorsport	(Germany) Frank Biela (Germany) Christian Hohenadel (Germany) Thomas Mutsch	Audi R8 LMS ultra	SP9	108	DNF	DNF
2013	(Russia) G-Drive Racing by Phoenix	(Germany) Frank Biela (Germany) Christer Jöns (Russia) Roman Rusinov	Audi R8 LMS ultra	SP9	86	9th	8th
2015	(Germany) Team Zakspeed	(Germany) Sebastian Asch (Netherlands) Tom Coronel (Germany) Christian Vietoris	Mercedes-Benz SLS AMG GT3	SP9	9	DNF	DNF
2016	(Germany) Mann-Filter Team Zakspeed	(Germany) Sebastian Asch (Germany) Kenneth Heyer (Germany) Daniel Keilwitz	Mercedes-Benz SLS AMG GT3	SP9	131	6th	6th
2019	(Germany) GetSpeed Performance	(Switzerland) Philip Ellis (Netherlands) Jules Szymkowiak (Germany) Fabian Vettel	Mercedes-AMG GT3	SP9	155	6th	6th
2020	(Switzerland) octane126	(Germany) Björn Grossmann (Switzerland) Jonathan Hirschi (Switzerland) Simon Trummer	Ferrari 488 GT3	SP9	79	NC	NC
2021	(Switzerland) octane126 AG	(Germany) Björn Grossmann (Switzerland) Jonathan Hirschi (Switzerland) Simon Trummer	Ferrari 488 GT3 Evo 2020	SP9	4	DNF	DNF
2022	(Switzerland) octane126 Serliana	(Germany) Björn Grossmann (Switzerland) Jonathan Hirschi (Switzerland) Simon Trummer	Ferrari 488 GT3 Evo 2020	SP9; Pro	82	DNF	DNF
2023	(Germany) racing one	(Germany) Stefan Aust (Germany) Christian Kohlhaas (Germany) Johannes Stengel	Ferrari 296 GT3	SP9; Pro-Am	155	15th	4th
2024	(Germany) Frikadelli Racing	(Germany) Felipe Fernández Laser (Germany) Daniel Keilwitz (Argentina) Nicolás Varrone	Ferrari 296 GT3	SP9; Pro	50	12th	11th
2025	(Germany) Scherer Sport PHX	(Germany) Christopher Haase (Germany) Markus Winkelhock	Audi R8 LMS Evo II	SP9; Pro	28	DNF	DNF
