= Jos Menten =

Dutch racing driver (born 1981)

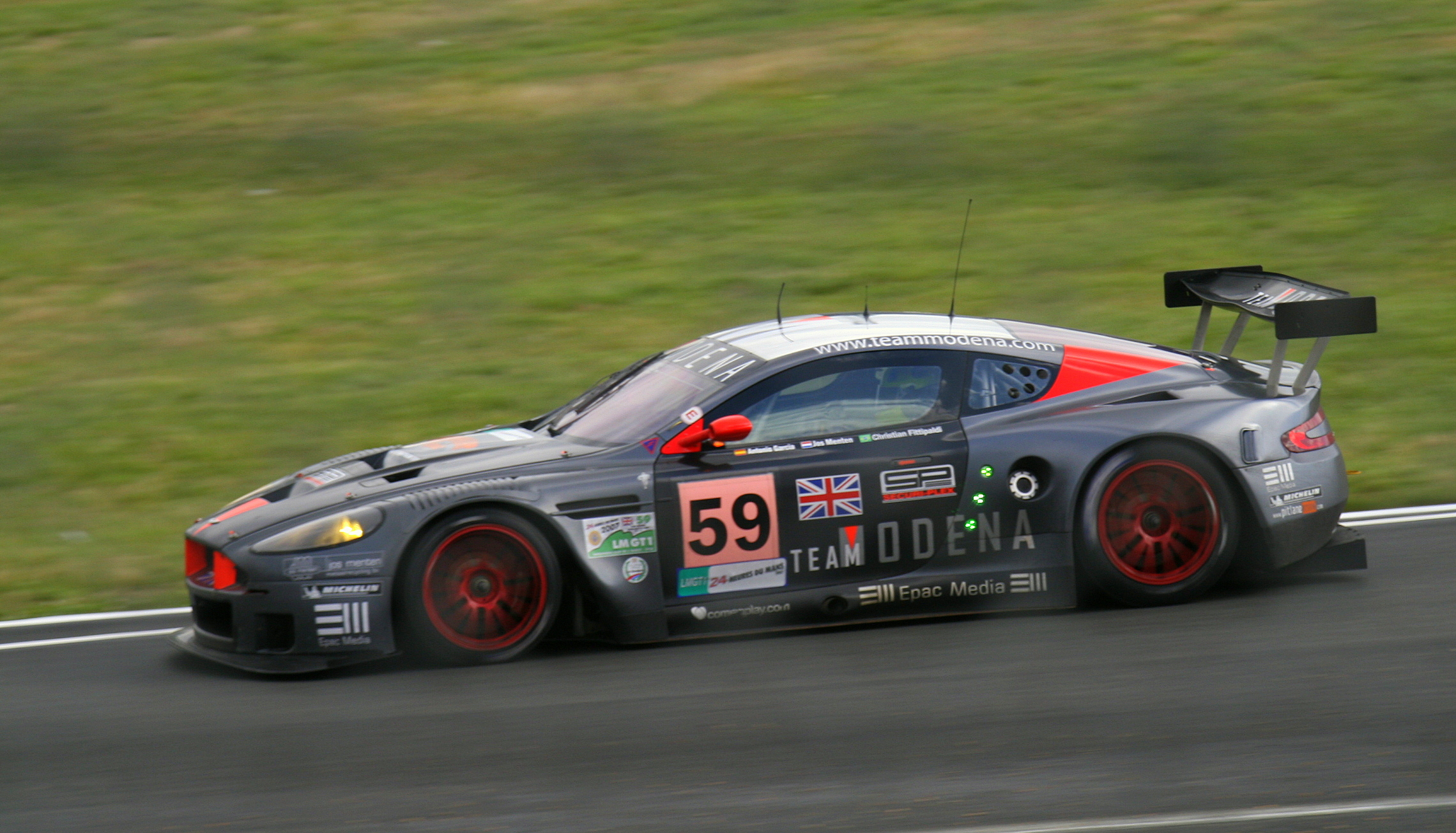
- Menten in 2007
- Nationality: (Netherlands) Dutch
- Born: Petrus Josephus Maria Lisa Menten Jr. 22 May 1981 (age 45) Roermond, Netherlands
- Categorisation: FIA Gold (until 2015); FIA Silver (2016–)

Championship titles
- 2023 2004: Porsche Endurance Trophy Belgium; Supercar Challenge – GT

Petrus Josephus Maria Lisa "Jos" Menten Jr. (born 22 May 1981) is a Dutch racing driver who last raced in the Porsche Endurance Trophy Nürburgring Cup for Scherer Sport PHX.

A mainstay in international sportscar races in the second half of the 2000s, Menten is an ADAC GT Masters and FIA GT1 World Championship race winner, as well as having won the 24 Hours of Spa overall in 2009.

== Career ==
Menten made his single-seater debut in 1999, racing in Formula Arcobaleno Netherlands. Spending two seasons in the series, Menten won the Junior championship in 2000, before switching to Formula Renault 2.0 Germany for the following two years, whilst also entering the sportscar scene with a podium at the 2002 Zolder 10 Hours.

Switching to sportscars full-time in 2003, Menten made his debut at the Spa 24 Hours that year for AD Sport, finishing second in the G2 class. The following year, Menten joined Marcos Racing International to race in the Supercar Challenge, scoring three wins as he won the GT class title alongside Cor Euser. Menten then joined PSI Motorsport for the 2005 Belcar Series alongside Fred Bouvy, taking a win at Brands Hatch and ending the year third in the GTA standings. During 2005, Menten also raced at the Spa 24 Hours for Selleslagh Racing Team, finishing seventh in the GT1 class.

Joining PSI Experience to race in the Le Mans Series the following year, Menten scored a lone podium at Spa and ended the year 13th in the GT1 standings. During 2006, Menten also competed part-time in the GT1 class of the FIA GT Championship, in which he most notably finished second at Le Castellet.

In 2007, Menten joined All-Inkl.com Racing to race full-time in the FIA GT Championship alongside Peter Kox. After racing with the team through the first five races, Menten switched to Reiter Engineering to complete the season, as well as a part-time schedule in ADAC GT Masters, winning both races at Zolder and race one at Sachsenring. During 2007, Menten also raced at the 24 Hours of Le Mans for Team Modena, finishing tenth in the GT1 class.

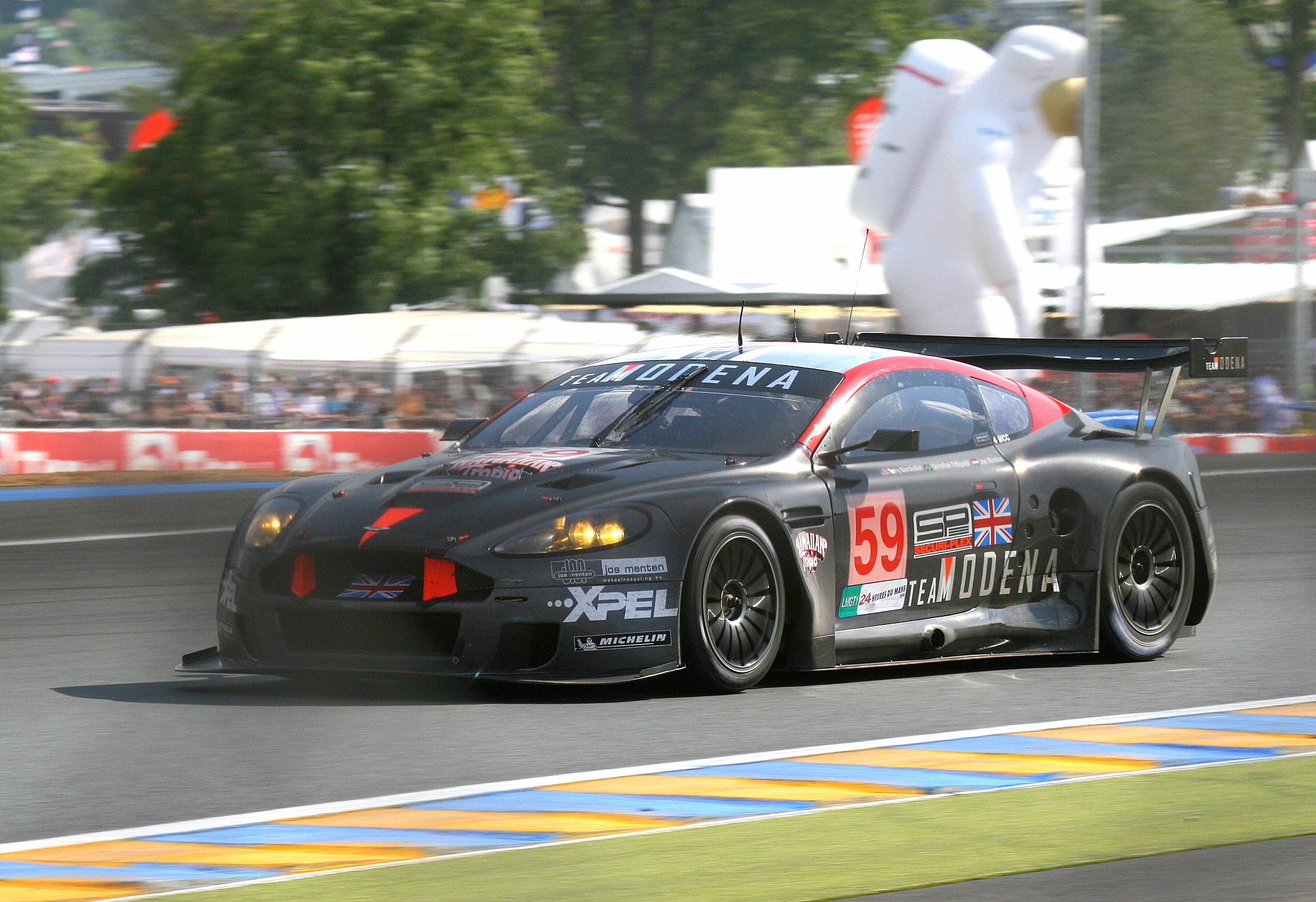
Menten's Team Modena Aston Martin at the 2008 24 Hours of Le Mans.

The following year, Menten primarily raced in BRL V6, as well as racing part-time in the FIA GT Championship, and returning to the GT1 class of the 24 Hours of Le Mans with Team Modena, finishing eighth in class in his second appearance at the event. In 2009, Menten only partook in two races, driving for DKR Engineering at the Silverstone round of the FIA GT Championship season, before teaming up with Mad-Croc Racing to race at the 24 Hours of Spa, which he won alongside Kurt Mollekens, Mike Hezemans and Anthony Kumpen. Once again racing on a part-time basis for 2010, Menten made his debut at the 24 Hours of Daytona for Matt Connolly Motorsports, as well as making select appearances in the FIA GT1 World Championship, most notably winning the qualifying race at Spa.

In the following three seasons, Menten made various one-off appearances in the Blancpain Endurance Series with Blancpain Reiter, most notably finishing sixth in the Pro-Am class at the 2012 24 Hours of Spa and ninth in the Pro class at Navarra the same year. Menten then primarily raced in Benelux across the next four years, most notably winning the New Year's Race of the 2016–17 Dutch Winter Endurance Series season.

Returning to PG Motorsport for 2018, Menten began the year in the Dutch Winter Endurance Series, in which he scored a class win at Zandvoort in January, ahead of return to the Belcar Endurance Championship. Racing in all but one rounds, Menten scored a lone podium at Spa as he ended the year fifth in the Belcar 1 standings. Following that, Menten made a one-off appearance in the 2019 24H GT Series for PG Motorsport, before spending the next four seasons racing part-time in the Nürburgring Langstrecken-Serie. In 2023, Menten also returned to Belcar Endurance Championship, winning the Porsche Endurance Trophy Belgium alongside Koen Wauters.

== Personal life ==
Menten is the CEO of Jos Menten Metaalrecycling, a company founded by his grandfather in 1937.

== Racing record ==
=== Racing career summary ===
Season	Series	Team	Races	Wins	Poles	F/Laps	Podiums	Points	Position
1999	Formula Arcobaleno Netherlands	Har Vaessen Racing	4	0	0	0	0	25	11th
2000	Formula Arcobaleno Netherlands	Har Vaessen Racing	8	1	1	0	3	87	5th
2000	Formula Lista Junior		2	0	0	0	1	22	13th
2001	Formula Renault 2.0 Germany	GM Motorsport	8	0	0	0	0	51	15th
2001	Formula Renault 2000 Eurocup	GM Motorsport	1	0	0	0	0	0	63rd
2002	Formula Renault 2.0 Germany	MA-con Racing	14	0	0	0	0	71	18th
2002	Formula Renault 2000 Eurocup	MA-con Racing	2	0	0	0	0	0	NC
2003	Zolder Touring Cup	AD Sport	1	1	0	0	1	0	NC
2003	Spa 24 Hours – G2	AD Sport	1	0	0	0	1	—N/a	**2nd**
2004	Supercar Challenge – GT	Marcos Racing International	6	3	0	0	4	??	**1st**
2004	Belcar Endurance	AD Sport	7	0	0	0	1	??	20th
2004	Spa 24 Hours – G2	PSI Motorsport	0	0	0	0	0	—N/a	DNS
2004–05	Dutch Winter Endurance Series		1	0	0	0	0	1	159th
2005	Belcar Series – GTA	PSI Motorsport	8	1	0	0	4	??	**3rd**
2005	FIA GT Championship – GT1	Renstal Excelsior	1	0	0	0	0	8	21st
2005	Belcar Endurance Cup	AD Sport	1	1	0	0	1	0	NC
2006	Le Mans Series – GT1	PSI Experience	5	0	0	0	1	16	13th
2006	FIA GT Championship – GT1	PSI Experience	2	0	0	0	1	14.5	15th
2006	FIA GT Championship – GT1	Zakspeed Racing	1	0	0	0	0	14.5	15th
2006	Belcar Endurance Cup	Selleslagh Racing Team	1	1	1	0	1	0	NC
2007	FIA GT Championship – GT1	All-Inkl.com Racing	5	0	0	0	0	11	15th
2007	FIA GT Championship – GT1	Reiter Lamborghini	4	0	0	0	0	11	15th
2007	ADAC GT Masters	Reiter Lamborghini	6	3	2	0	3	30	7th
2007	24 Hours of Le Mans – GT1	Team Modena	1	0	0	0	0	—N/a	10th
2008	FIA GT Championship – GT1	Team Rbimmo / B-Racing	3	0	0	0	0	0	NC
2008	FIA GT Championship – GT1	Phoenix Carsport Racing	1	0	0	0	0	0	NC
2008	24 Hours of Le Mans – GT1	Team Modena	1	0	0	0	0	—N/a	8th
2008	BRL-V6	Kuijpers Racing	12	0	0	0	0	31	15th
2009	FIA GT Championship – GT1	DKR Engineering	1	0	0	0	0	12	11th
2009	FIA GT Championship – GT1	PekaRacing nv	1	1	0	0	1	12	11th
2010	Rolex Sports Car Series – GT	Matt Connolly Motorsports	1	0	0	0	0	16	56th
2010	FIA GT1 World Championship	Reiter	4	0	0	0	1	27	22nd
2010	FIA GT1 World Championship	Mad-Croc Racing	6	1	0	0	1	27	22nd
2010	24 Hours of Spa – GT3	Prospeed Competition	1	0	0	0	0	—N/a	7th
2011	Blancpain Endurance Series – GT3 Pro-Am	Blancpain Reiter	1	0	0	0	0	0	NC
2011	Belcar – GT3	Reiter	1	0	0	0	0	1	26th
2012	Blancpain Endurance Series – Pro	Blancpain Reiter	1	0	0	0	0	0	NC
2012	Blancpain Endurance Series – Pro-Am	Blancpain Reiter	1	0	0	0	0	21	20th
2013	Blancpain Endurance Series – Pro	Blancpain Racing	0	0	0	0	0	0	NC
2013	Blancpain Endurance Series – Pro-Am	Blancpain Racing	1	0	0	0	0	0	NC
2013	24 Hours of Nürburgring – SP7	Raceunion Teichmann Racing	1	0	0	0	1	—N/a	**3rd**
2014–15	Dutch Winter Endurance Series	Heezen Racing Team						8	58th
2015	BMW M235i Cup Belgium	Dreszer Motorsport	1	1	0	0	1	75	14th
2016	Supercar Challenge – GTB	Power Race Products	2	0	0	0	1	28	13th
2017–18	Dutch Winter Endurance Series – Division 1	PG Motorsport	3	1	0	0	2	4	7th
2018	Belcar Endurance Championship – Belcar 1	PG Motorsport	5	0	0	0	1	57	5th
2019	24H GT Series – 991	PG Motorsport	1	0	0	0	0	12	NC
2020	Nürburgring Langstrecken-Serie – V4	rent2drive-FAMILIA-racing	1	0	0	0	0	6.94	40th
2021	Nürburgring Langstrecken-Serie – V4	TM-Racing by PLUSLINE AG	2	0	0	0	0	0	NC
2021	Nürburgring Langstrecken-Serie – Cup X	Teichmann Racing GT4	2	0	0	0	2	7.5	8th
2023	Porsche Endurance Trophy Nürburgring – Cup2	Mühlner Motorsport	2	0	0	0	0	23.5	31st
2024	Porsche Endurance Trophy Nürburgring Cup – Cup2 Pro	Scherer Sport PHX	3	0	0	0	0	0	NC

^{†} As Menten was a guest driver, he was ineligible to score points.

=== Complete FIA GT Championship results ===
(key) (Races in bold indicate pole position) (Races in italics indicate fastest lap)

Year	Team	Car	Class	1	2	3	4	5	6	7	8	9	10	11	12	13	Pos.	Pts
2005	Renstal Excelsior	Chevrolet Corvette C5-R	GT1	MNZ	MAG	SIL	IMO	BRN	SPA; 6H; 4	SPA; 12H; 6	SPA; 24H; 5	OSC	IST	ZHU	DUB	BHR	21st	8
2006	PSI Experience	Chevrolet Corvette C6.R	GT1	SIL	BRN	OSC	SPA; 6H; 9	SPA; 12H; 6	SPA; 24H; 5	LEC; 2	DIJ	MUG	HUN	ADR			15th	14.5
2006	Zakspeed Racing	Saleen S7-R	GT1												DUB; 8		15th	14.5
2007	All-Inkl.com Racing	Lamborghini Murcélago R-GT	GT1	ZHU; 11	SIL; Ret	BUC; Ret	MNZ; 10	OSC; 5									15th	11
2007	Reiter Lamborghini	Lamborghini Murcélago R-GT	GT1						SPA; 6H; 12	SPA; 12H; 11	SPA; 24H; Ret	ADR; 6	BRN; 8	NOG	ZOL; 6		15th	11
2008	Team Rbimmo / B-Racing	Saleen S7-R	GT1	SIL; 13	MNZ; Ret	ADR; Ret	OSC										NC	0
2008	Phoenix Carsport Racing	Chevrolet Corvette C6.R	GT1					SPA; 6H; Ret	SPA; 12H; Ret	SPA; 24H; Ret	BUC; 1	BUC; 2	BRN	NOG	ZOL	SAN	NC	0
2009	DKR Engineering	Corvette C6.R	GT1	SIL; 7	ADR	OSC											11th	12
2009	PekaRacing nv	Corvette C6.R	GT1				SPA; 6H ?	SPA; 12H ?	SPA; 24H; 1	BUD	ALG	LEC	ZOL				11th	12

=== Complete Le Mans Series results ===
(key) (Races in bold indicate pole position; results in italics indicate fastest lap)

Year	Entrant	Class	Chassis	Engine	1	2	3	4	5	Rank	Points
2006	PSI Experience	GT1	Chevrolet Corvette C6.R	Chevrolet 7.0L V8	IST; Ret	SPA; 3	NUR; Ret	DON; 4	JAR; 4	13th	16

=== Complete ADAC GT Masters results ===
(key) (Races in bold indicate pole position) (Races in italics indicate fastest lap)

Year	Team	Car	1	2	3	4	5	6	7	8	9	10	11	12	DC	Points
2007	Reiter Lamborghini	Lamborghini Gallardo GT3	NÜR; 1	NÜR; 2	OSC; 1 WD	OSC; 2 WD	LAU; 1	LAU; 2	**ZOL**; **1**; 1	ZOL; 2; 1	**SAC**; **1**; 1	SAC; 2 Ret	HOC; 1; 6	HOC; 2 Ret	7th	30

=== 24 Hours of Le Mans results ===
Year	Team	Co-Drivers	Car	Class	Laps	Pos.	Class Pos.
2007	(United Kingdom) Team Modena	(Spain) Antonio García (Brazil) Christian Fittipaldi	Aston Martin DBR9	GT1	318	17th	10th
2008	(United Kingdom) Team Modena	(United States) Terry Borcheller (Brazil) Christian Fittipaldi	Aston Martin DBR9	GT1	302	30th	8th

=== Complete GT1 World Championship results ===
(key) (Races in bold indicate pole position) (Races in italics indicate fastest lap)

Year	Team	Car	1	2	3	4	5	6	7	8	9	10	11	12	13	14	15	16	17	18	19	20	Pos	Points
2010	Reiter	Lamborghini Murciélago LP 670 R-SV	ABU; QR	ABU; CR	SIL; QR; 6	SIL; CR; 3	BRN; QR	BRN; CR	PRI; QR	PRI; CR					ALG; QR; 14	ALG; CR; 8	NAV; QR	NAV; CR	INT; QR	INT; CR	SAN; QR	SAN; CR	22nd	27
2010	Mad-Croc Racing	Corvette C6.R									SPA; QR; 1	SPA; CR; Ret	NÜR; QR; 18	NÜR; CR; 18									22nd	27

=== Complete GT World Challenge Europe results ===
==== GT World Challenge Europe Endurance Cup ====
(key) (Races in bold indicate pole position) (Races in italics indicate fastest lap)

Year	Team	Car	Class	1	2	3	4	5	6	7	8	Pos.	Points
2011	Blancpain Reiter	Lamborghini Gallardo LP600 GT3	GT3 Pro-Am	MNZ	NAV	SPA; 6H ??	SPA; 12H ??	SPA; 24H; Ret	MAG	SIL		NC	0
2012	Blancpain Reiter	Lamborghini Gallardo LP600 GT3	Pro-Am	MNZ	SIL	LEC	SPA; 6H ??	SPA; 12H ??	SPA; 24H; 11	NÜR		20th	21
2012	Blancpain Reiter	Lamborghini Gallardo LP600 GT3	Pro								NAV; 11	20th	21
2013	Blancpain Racing	Lamborghini LP 600 FL2	Pro	MNZ	SIL	LEC; WD						NC	0
2013	Blancpain Racing	Lamborghini LP 560–4	Pro-Am				SPA; 6H ?	SPA; 12H ?	SPA; 24H; Ret	NÜR		NC	0
