= 2008 ADAC GT Masters =

Motorsport season

Seasons
- ← 2007 2009 →

The 2008 ADAC GT Masters season was the second season of the ADAC GT Masters, the grand tourer-style sports car racing founded by the German automobile club ADAC. It began on 10 June at Motorsport Arena Oschersleben and finished on 21 September at Sachsenring after seven double-header meetings. Tim Bergmeister with help of his brother Jörg, Marc Basseng and Frank Stippler clinched the championship title.

== Race calendar and results ==
Round		Circuit	Date	Pole	Winner
1	R1	(Germany) Motorsport Arena Oschersleben	10 May	No. 6 Matech Concepts	No. 6 Matech Concepts
1	R1	(Germany) Motorsport Arena Oschersleben	10 May	(Germany) Thomas Mutsch (Germany) Jürgen von Gartzen	(Germany) Thomas Mutsch (Germany) Jürgen von Gartzen
1	R2	(Germany) Motorsport Arena Oschersleben	11 May	No. 6 Matech Concepts	No. 5 Matech Concepts
1	R2	(Germany) Motorsport Arena Oschersleben	11 May	(Germany) Thomas Mutsch (Germany) Jürgen von Gartzen	(Germany) Marc Hennerici (Germany) Kenneth Heyer
2	R1	(Germany) Nürburgring	23 May	No. 3 Argo Racing	No. 33 Heico Motorsport
2	R1	(Germany) Nürburgring	23 May	(Germany) Sebastian Asch (Germany) Frank Schmickler	(Germany) Lance David Arnold (Germany) Frank Stippler
2	R2	(Germany) Nürburgring	24 May	No. 2 Reiter Engineering	No. 2 Reiter Engineering
2	R2	(Germany) Nürburgring	24 May	(Netherlands) Peter Kox (Russia) Roman Rusinov	(Netherlands) Peter Kox (Russia) Roman Rusinov
3	R1	(Germany) Norisring	28 June	No. 19 Toni Seiler Racing	No. 19 Toni Seiler Racing
3	R1	(Germany) Norisring	28 June	(Germany) Klaus Ludwig (Germany) Dominik Schwager	(Germany) Klaus Ludwig (Germany) Dominik Schwager
3	R2	(Germany) Norisring	29 June	No. 5 Matech Concepts	No. 15 Mühlner Motorsport
3	R2	(Germany) Norisring	29 June	(Germany) Marc Hennerici (Germany) Kenneth Heyer	(Germany) Tim Bergmeister (Germany) Marc Basseng
4	R1	(Netherlands) TT Circuit Assen	19 July	No. 1 Reiter Engineering	No. 1 Reiter Engineering
4	R1	(Netherlands) TT Circuit Assen	19 July	(Germany) Christopher Haase (Germany) Albert von Thurn & Taxis	(Germany) Christopher Haase (Germany) Albert von Thurn & Taxis
4	R2	(Netherlands) TT Circuit Assen	20 July	No. 1 Reiter Engineering	No. 1 Reiter Engineering
4	R2	(Netherlands) TT Circuit Assen	20 July	(Germany) Christopher Haase (Germany) Albert von Thurn & Taxis	(Germany) Christopher Haase (Germany) Albert von Thurn & Taxis
5	R1	(Germany) Nürburgring	16 August	No. 57 Callaway Competition	No. 57 Callaway Competition
5	R1	(Germany) Nürburgring	16 August	(Germany) Klaus Ludwig (Germany) Dominik Schwager	(Germany) Klaus Ludwig (Germany) Dominik Schwager
5	R2	(Germany) Nürburgring	17 August	No. 4 Argo Racing	No. 57 Callaway Competition
5	R2	(Germany) Nürburgring	17 August	(Germany) Harald Becker (Germany) Frank Kechele	(Germany) Klaus Ludwig (Germany) Dominik Schwager
6	R1	(Germany) EuroSpeedway Lausitz	6 September	No. 29 Hexis Racing	No. 15 Mühlner Motorsport
6	R1	(Germany) EuroSpeedway Lausitz	6 September	(France) Philippe Dumas (Germany) Christian Hohenadel	(Germany) Jörg Bergmeister (Germany) Tim Bergmeister
6	R2	(Germany) EuroSpeedway Lausitz	7 September	No. 5 Matech Concepts	No. 15 Mühlner Motorsport
6	R2	(Germany) EuroSpeedway Lausitz	7 September	(Germany) Marc Hennerici (Germany) Kenneth Heyer	(Germany) Jörg Bergmeister (Germany) Tim Bergmeister
7	R1	(Germany) Sachsenring	20 September	No. 3 Argo Racing	No. 29 Hexis Racing
7	R1	(Germany) Sachsenring	20 September	(Germany) Sebastian Asch (Germany) Frank Schmickler	(Germany) Christian Hohenadel (France) Frédéric Makowiecki
7	R2	(Germany) Sachsenring	21 September	No. 29 Hexis Racing	No. 2 Reiter Engineering
7	R2	(Germany) Sachsenring	21 September	(Germany) Christian Hohenadel (France) Frédéric Makowiecki	(Netherlands) Peter Kox (Russia) Roman Rusinov

== Standings ==
Pos	Driver	OSC (Germany)		NÜR (Germany)		NOR (Germany)		ASS (Netherlands)		NÜR (Germany)		LAU (Germany)		SAC (Germany)		Pts
1	(Germany) Tim Bergmeister	2	3	6	4	3	1	7	4	Ret	4	1	1	6	6	80
2	(Germany) Christopher Haase (Germany) Albert von Thurn & Taxis	4	6	5	3	Ret	2	**1**	**1**	8	Ret	3	5	3	4	73
3	(Germany) Harald Becker (Germany) Frank Kechele	6	4	3	8	Ret	Ret	4	6	4	**2**	8	13	9	5	48
4	(Germany) Sebastian Asch (Germany) Frank Schmickler	5	7	**2**	Ret	9	11	8	4	5	3	4	3	**Ret**	14	44
5	(Germany) Christian Hohenadel			9	7	8	7	6	9	Ret	20	**2**	2	1	**2**	43
6	(Germany) Jörg Bergmeister	2	3									1	1	6	6	42
7	(Germany) Frank Stippler	15	Ret	1	12	5	6	7	4	Ret	4					31
8	(Netherlands) Jan Lammers			5	9	2	15	2	2	12	9	Ret	10	12	10	30
=	(Netherlands) Marius Ritskes	9	9	5	9	2	15	2	2	12	9	Ret	10	12	10	30
9	(Czech Republic) Martin Matzke (Czech Republic) Jiří Skula	7	10	Ret	6	4	5	3	10	3	15	15	DSQ	Ret	Ret	28
10	(France) Julien Rodrigues	3	8	7	Ret	8	7	5	7			Ret	8	5	15	25
11	(Germany) Marc Basseng			6	4	3	1									24
=	(France) Philippe Dumas	8	5			6	9	13	Ret			**2**	2			24
13	(Germany) Oliver Mayer (Switzerland) Toni Seiler	14	17	8	5	11	8	11	8	7	10	9	4	7	17	21
14	(Netherlands) Peter Kox (Russia) Roman Rusinov			17	**1**	14	Ret							NC	1	20
=	(Germany) Marc Hennerici (Germany) Kenneth Heyer	Ret	1	Ret	2	18	**Ret**	Ret	DNS	Ret	Ret	Ret	**DNS**	Ret	8	20
=	(Portugal) Manu Rodrigues	8	5	9	7	6	9	6	9			Ret	8	5	15	20
17	(Germany) Thomas Mutsch (Germany) Jürgen von Gartzen	**1**	**2**													18
=	(France) Frédéric Makowiecki													1	**2**	18
19	(Germany) Klaus Ludwig (Note: Ineligible for points at Nürburgring and Sachsenring.) (Germany) Dominik Schwager					**1**	4			**1**	1			2	3	15
=	(Netherlands) Sebastiaan Bleekemolen									10	5			4	7	15
21	(Germany) Sascha Bert					10	3			9	6					12
=	(Austria) Alois Meir	Ret	DNS			10	3			9	6					12
22	(Germany) Lance David Arnold			1	12											10
=	(Italy) Niki Cadei (Bulgaria) Plamen Kralev									2	21					10
24	(Netherlands) Jeroen Bleekemolen					12	18							4	7	9
=	(Netherlands) Ronald Van De Laar	Ret	15	13	14	12	18	10	Ret	10	5	7	15	Ret	12	9
=	(Switzerland) Michel Frey			7	Ret			5	7	Ret	20					9
27	(Germany) Michael Raja	10	12	11	10	7	10			15	8	10	6	10	9	8
28	(France) Thomas Accary	3	8													7
=	(Czech Republic) Jiří Janak					5	6									7
30	(Germany) Dino Steiner (Germany) Jürgen Häring											6	7			6
31	(Germany) Marc Gindorf (Germany) Frank Kräling									11	7					3
=	(Netherlands) Melvin de Groot			13	14							7	15			3
=	(Germany) Michael Funke											10	6			3
34	(Germany) Alfred Renauer					7	10					11	DNS			2
=	(Germany) Rainer Stiefel	10	12	11	10					15	8					2
=	(Austria) Jörg Peham	16	16	14	16	16	13			16	12	Ret	DSQ	8	11	2
=	(Germany) Ruben Zeltner													8	11	2
37	(Germany) Markus Lungstrass													10	9	1
	(Netherlands) Mike Hezemans	9	9													0
	(Liechtenstein) Thomas Wille	DNS	DNS	10	11	13	19			13	19	Ret	12	13	13	0
	(Germany) Carsten Welpmann	DNS	DNS	10	11											0
	(Germany) Jens Richter	19	13	12	13	Ret	17	12	10	17	14					0
	(Germany) Manuel Lauck	19	13	12	13	Ret	17	12	10							0
	(Netherlands) Michael Bleekemolen	Ret	15					10	Ret					Ret	12	0
	(Germany) Christoph Langen	17	Ret	DNS	19							13	11	11	Ret	0
	(Switzerland) Hans Hauser	11	19	Ret	18					18	17			14	18	0
	(Italy) Mauro Casadei	11	19	Ret	18											0
	(Italy) Gianni Morbidelli (Netherlands) Dennis Retera	Ret	11													0
	(Germany) Freddy Kremer	12	DSQ	16	15	13	19			13	19	Ret	12	13	13	0
	(Austria) Mathias Schmitter	16	16	14	16	16	13			16	12	Ret	DSQ			0
	(Austria) Otto Dragun	18	18	15	17	15	12			19	Ret			15	16	0
	(Austria) Alex Guillaume Ellinger	18	18	15	17	15	12			19	Ret					0
	(Germany) Peter Terting	12	DSQ													0
	(United Kingdom) Chris Hyman (United Kingdom) Paul Warren	13	14													0
	(Germany) Sven Hannawald	17	Ret	DNS	19	Ret	16			20	13					0
	(Austria) Patrick Ortlieb (Germany) Martin Sagmeister					17	14									0
	(Germany) Dirk Ebeling	14	Ret													0
	(Switzerland) Loris Kessel			16	15											0
	(Germany) Johannes Stuck					Ret	16									0
	(Italy) Luca Pirri	Ret	DNS													0
Guest drivers ineligible for points
	(Czech Republic) Adam Lacko (Czech Republic) Štěpán Vojtěch							9	3	6	Ret	5	9			0
	(Switzerland) Tobias Blättler							13	Ret	14	11					0
	(France) Pierre-Brice Mena									14	11					0
	(Germany) Roland Rehfeld											13	11			0
	(Germany) Ronny Melkus													11	Ret	0
	(Germany) Christoph Schrezenmeier											11	DNS			0
	(Germany) Robert Renauer (Germany) Hermann Speck											12	14			0
	(Germany) Thomas Jäger									20	13					0
	(Liechtenstein) Martin Wachter									18	17	14	Ret	14	18	0
	(Germany) Christopher Mies									17	14					0
	(Germany) Holger Goedicke											14	Ret			0
	(Austria) Georg Zoltan													15	16	0
	(Switzerland) Stephane Jaggi (Switzerland) Leonard Vernet									21	16					0
	(France) Ulric Amado (France) David Ferrer									22	18					0
Pos	Driver	OSC (Germany)		NÜR (Germany)		NOR (Germany)		ASS (Netherlands)		NÜR (Germany)		LAU (Germany)		SAC (Germany)		Pts

Colour	Result
Gold	Winner
Silver	Second place
Bronze	Third place
Green	Points classification
Blue	Non-points classification
Blue	Non-classified finish (NC)
Purple	Retired, not classified (Ret)
Red	Did not qualify (DNQ)
Red	Did not pre-qualify (DNPQ)
Black	Disqualified (DSQ)
White	Did not start (DNS)
White	Withdrew (WD)
White	Race cancelled (C)
Blank	Did not practice (DNP)
Blank	Did not arrive (DNA)
Blank	Excluded (EX)

**Bold** – Pole
Italics – Fastest Lap
