= 2007 ADAC GT Masters =

Motorsport season

Seasons
- ← none 2008 →

The 2007 ADAC GT Masters season was the inaugural season of the ADAC GT Masters, the grand tourer-style sports car racing founded by the German automobile club ADAC. It began on 7 June at Nürburgring and finished on 14 October, at Hockenheim after six double-header meetings. Christopher Haase with help of Gianni Morbidelli and Jos Menten became the first series champion.

== Race calendar and results ==
Round		Circuit	Date	Pole	Winner
1	R1	(Germany) Nürburgring	7 June	(Germany) No. 7 Reiter Engineering	(Germany) No. 7 Reiter Engineering
1	R1	(Germany) Nürburgring	7 June	(Germany) Christopher Haase (Italy) Gianni Morbidelli	(Germany) Christopher Haase (Italy) Gianni Morbidelli
1	R2	(Germany) Nürburgring	9 June	(Germany) No. 53 Reiter Engineering	(Belgium) No. 1 ARGO Racing
1	R2	(Germany) Nürburgring	9 June	(Netherlands) Jeroen Bleekemolen (Netherlands) Marius Ritskes	(Germany) Wolfgang Kaufmann (Netherlands) Alexander van der Lof
2	R1	(Germany) Motorsport Arena Oschersleben	7 July	(Germany) No. 7 Reiter Engineering	(Germany) No. 6 Reiter Engineering
2	R1	(Germany) Motorsport Arena Oschersleben	7 July	(Germany) Christopher Haase (Italy) Gianni Morbidelli	(Netherlands) Peter Kox (Germany) Albert von Thurn & Taxis
2	R2	(Germany) Motorsport Arena Oschersleben	8 July	(Germany) No. 7 Reiter Engineering	(Germany) No. 7 Reiter Engineering
2	R2	(Germany) Motorsport Arena Oschersleben	8 July	(Germany) Christopher Haase (Italy) Gianni Morbidelli	(Germany) Christopher Haase (Italy) Gianni Morbidelli
3	R1	(Germany) EuroSpeedway Lausitz	4 August	(Germany) No. 51 Kissling Motorsport	(Germany) No. 25 Martini Callaway Competition
3	R1	(Germany) EuroSpeedway Lausitz	4 August	(Germany) Sascha Bert (Germany) Stefan Kissling	(Switzerland) Patrick Gerling (Switzerland) Toni Seiler
3	R2	(Germany) EuroSpeedway Lausitz	5 August	(Germany) No. 7 Reiter Engineering	(Germany) No. 6 Reiter Engineering
3	R2	(Germany) EuroSpeedway Lausitz	5 August	(Germany) Christopher Haase (Italy) Gianni Morbidelli	(Netherlands) Peter Kox (Germany) Albert von Thurn & Taxis
4	R1	(Belgium) Circuit Zolder	25 August	(Germany) No. 7 Reiter Engineering	(Germany) No. 7 Reiter Engineering
4	R1	(Belgium) Circuit Zolder	25 August	(Germany) Christopher Haase (Netherlands) Jos Menten	(Germany) Christopher Haase (Netherlands) Jos Menten
4	R2	(Belgium) Circuit Zolder	26 August	(Germany) No. 6 Reiter Engineering	(Germany) No. 7 Reiter Engineering
4	R2	(Belgium) Circuit Zolder	26 August	(Netherlands) Peter Kox (Germany) Albert von Thurn & Taxis	(Germany) Christopher Haase (Netherlands) Jos Menten
5	R1	(Germany) Sachsenring	15 September	(Germany) No. 7 Reiter Engineering	(Germany) No. 7 Reiter Engineering
5	R1	(Germany) Sachsenring	15 September	(Germany) Christopher Haase (Netherlands) Jos Menten	(Germany) Christopher Haase (Netherlands) Jos Menten
5	R2	(Germany) Sachsenring	16 September	(Germany) No. 6 Reiter Engineering	(Germany) No. 6 Reiter Engineering
5	R2	(Germany) Sachsenring	16 September	(Netherlands) Peter Kox (Germany) Albert von Thurn & Taxis	(Netherlands) Peter Kox (Germany) Albert von Thurn & Taxis
6	R1	(Germany) Hockenheimring	13 October	(Switzerland) No. 28 Kessel Racing Schweiz	(Switzerland) No. 28 Kessel Racing Schweiz
6	R1	(Germany) Hockenheimring	13 October	(Switzerland) Henri Moser (Austria) Philipp Peter	(Switzerland) Henri Moser (Austria) Philipp Peter
6	R2	(Germany) Hockenheimring	14 October	(Germany) No. 26 Callaway Competition	(Switzerland) No. 28 Kessel Racing Schweiz
6	R2	(Germany) Hockenheimring	14 October	(Germany) Klaus Ludwig (Germany) Jürgen von Gartzen	(Switzerland) Henri Moser (Austria) Philipp Peter

== Championship standings ==
=== Points system ===
Scoring system

Championship points are awarded for the first eight positions in each race.

Position	1st	2nd	3rd	4th	5th	6th	7th	8th
Points	10	8	6	5	4	3	2	1

=== Drivers' standings ===
Pos	Driver	NÜR (Germany)		OSC (Germany)		LAU (Germany)		ZOL (Belgium)		SAC (Germany)		HOC (Germany)		Pts
1	(Germany) Christopher Haase	1	2	8	1	2	3	1	1	1	Ret	Ret	7	79
2	(Netherlands) Peter Kox (Germany) Albert von Thurn & Taxis	Ret	8	1	3	6	1	2	3	2	1	2	Ret	74
3	(Germany) Frank Schmickler (Germany) Jan Seyffarth	5	4	6	7	3	4	4	5	5	4	9	4	58
4	(Germany) Wolfgang Kaufmann (Netherlands) Alexander van der Lof	3	1	3	5	Ret	5	3	2	Ret	9	7	6	56
5	(Italy) Gianni Morbidelli	1	2	8	1	2	3					Ret	7	49
6	(Switzerland) Patrick Gerling (Switzerland) Toni Seiler	8	Ret	5	4	1	12			3	2	8	5	46
7	(Netherlands) Jos Menten (Note: Ineligible for points at Hockenheim.)			WD	WD			1	1	1	Ret	6	Ret	30
=	(Czech Republic) Martin Matzke (Czech Republic) Jiří Skula			DNS	DNS	7	11	Ret	DNS	4	5	4	2	30
8	(Germany) Nikolai Krassin	11	4	Ret	10	8	9	10	12	6	7	11	12	20
9	(Germany) Harald Becker	9	6	12	Ret	5	13	5	4			26	9	19
=	(Germany) Kenneth Heyer	9	6	12	Ret	5	13	5	4			5	Ret	19
=	(Germany) Achim Winter	Ret	7	7	6	9	6	16	15	Ret	6	Ret	8	19
10	(Germany) Andreas Teichmann	10	9	10	9	10	7	7	9	8	3	22	Ret	17
11	(Switzerland) Henri Moser (Austria) Philipp Peter			2	2							1	1	16
12	(Italy) Stefano Gabellini	Ret	7			9	6	16	15	Ret	6	Ret	8	14
13	(Germany) Christian Mamerow (Germany) Peter Mamerow	2	Ret	4	Ret									13
14	(Germany) Altfrid Heger	11	4	Ret	10	8	9	10	12			26	9	10
15	(Switzerland) Benjamin Leuenberger	10	9	Ret	Ret	10	7			7	10		15	7
=	(Germany) Michael Funke									8	3			7
16	(France) Christophe Bouchut (Germany) René Münnich	6	Ret	DNS	DNS			9	Ret					6
=	(Germany) Christian Hohenadel			9	8	11	8	Ret	10	Ret	8	28	Ret	6
=	(Germany) Christian Pladwig			9	8	11	8	Ret	10	Ret	8	27	18	6
=	(Germany) Michael Raja			10	9			7	9			22	Ret	6
17	(Germany) Patrick Simon			7	6									5
=	(Germany) Ruben Zeltner									6	7			5
=	(Germany) Thomas Riethmüller											11	12	5
18	(Germany) Ulrich Berberich Martini	7	Ret											3
=	(Germany) Klaus Ludwig	7	Ret									25	Ret	3
=	(Switzerland) Albert Grob	12	10	Ret	Ret					7	10	15	15	3
19	(Germany) Freddy Kremer (Germany) Ralf Preßlein	13	11	11	11	12	10					13	Ret	2
20	(Germany) Arvid Steinberg (Germany) Georg Severich											14	Ret	1
21	(Switzerland) Bruno Eichmann	12	10									15		0
Guest drivers ineligible for points
	(Germany) Sascha Bert					4	2					10	13	0
	(Germany) Stefan Kissling					4	2							0
	(Finland) Olli Haapalainen (Estonia) Indrek Sepp											3	3	0
	(Netherlands) Marius Ritskes	4	3	WD	WD			6	Ret			6	Ret	0
	(Netherlands) Jeroen Bleekemolen	4	3											0
	(Germany) Thomas Mutsch											5	Ret	0
	(Belgium) Stéphanie Boden (Netherlands) Alexander van der Lof							12	6					0
	(Netherlands) Jan Lammers							6	Ret					0
	(United Kingdom) Michael Greenhalgh (United Kingdom) Erik Zwart							8	7					0
	(Belgium) Tom Van de Plas (Belgium) Wim Lumbeeck							11	8					0
	(Germany) Jürgen Barth									9	11			0
	(Germany) Dieter Pladwig									9	11	27	18	0
	(United Kingdom) Michael Neuhoff (Germany) Pierre Kaffer											12	10	0
	(Belgium) Stéphane Lémeret											10	13	0
	(Germany) Sieghard Sonntag (Germany) Bettina Sonntag									10	Ret			0
	(Belgium) Danny de Laet (Belgium) Bert van Rossem							13	11					0
	(Switzerland) Marcel Fässler (Switzerland) Peter Röschmann											18	11	0
	(Belgium) Günther Raus (Belgium) Peter Vanoudenhove							15	13					0
	(United Kingdom) Michael Donovan							14	14			19	14	0
	(United Kingdom) Nick Dudfield							14	14					0
	(United Kingdom) Pete Richings											19	14	0
	(Austria) Jörg Peham (Switzerland) Matthias Schmitter											16	16	0
	(Germany) George Nolte (Germany) René Wolff											24	17	0
	(Switzerland) Andrea Chiesa (Switzerland) Loris Kessel											17	Ret	0
	(Austria) Otto Dragoun (Austria) Alois Meir											21	19	0
	(Austria) Paul Pfefferkorn (Austria) Martin Sagmeister											23	20	0
	(Finland) Mikael Forsten (Finland) Markus Palttala											20	Ret	0
	(Germany) Jürgen von Gartzen											25	Ret	0
	(Germany) Uwe Alzen											28	Ret	0
	(Belgium) David Sterckx (Netherlands) Ron Marchal							Ret	DNS					0
	(Netherlands) Klaas Zwart							DNS	DNS					0
Pos	Driver	NÜR (Germany)		OSC (Germany)		LAU (Germany)		ZOL (Belgium)		SAC (Germany)		HOC (Germany)		Pts

Colour	Result
Gold	Winner
Silver	Second place
Bronze	Third place
Green	Points classification
Blue	Non-points classification
Blue	Non-classified finish (NC)
Purple	Retired, not classified (Ret)
Red	Did not qualify (DNQ)
Red	Did not pre-qualify (DNPQ)
Black	Disqualified (DSQ)
White	Did not start (DNS)
White	Withdrew (WD)
White	Race cancelled (C)
Blank	Did not practice (DNP)
Blank	Did not arrive (DNA)
Blank	Excluded (EX)

=== Teams' standings ===
Pos	Team	Pts
1	(Germany) Reiter Engineering	110
2	(Germany) SMS Seyffarth Motorsport	66
3	(Belgium) ARGO Racing	61
4	(Germany) Callaway Competition	47
5	(Germany) Waiblinger Motorsport Club	35
6	(Czech Republic) MM Racing	28
7	(Germany) GS Motorsport	27
8	(Switzerland) Kessel Racing Schweiz	23
9	(Germany) GAG Racing	14
=	(Germany) Aero Sport Team / GAG Racing	14
10	(Germany) MAMEROW Racing	13
11	(Switzerland) Carsport Racing Swiss	10
12	(Germany) All-inkl.com Racing	7
=	(Germany) Cat Race Team	7
