= Christopher Haase =

German racing driver (born 1987)

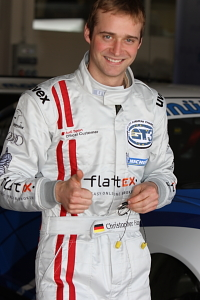
- Christopher Haase
- Nationality: German
- Born: 26 September 1987 (age 39) Kulmbach, West Germany
- Categorisation: FIA Gold (until 2014); FIA Platinum (2015–)

Championship titles
- 2024 2012 2009 2008 2007: International GT Open; Blancpain Endurance Series; FIA GT3 European Championship; GT4 European Cup Sports Light; ADAC GT Masters

Christopher Haase (born 26 September 1987 in Kulmbach) is a German professional racing driver.

Haase currently competes in the GT World Challenge Europe with Audi team Eastalent Racing. Among his most notable successes are winning the 2007 ADAC GT Masters title, triumphing alongside Christopher Mies in the 2009 FIA GT3 European Championship, and taking home the Nürburgring 24 Hours in 2012 and 2014. He also won the Blancpain Endurance Series in 2012 and the 24 Hours of Spa in 2017.

As of March 2026, Haase is the most experienced driver in the GT World Challenge Europe, having contested 91 events since 2012.

== Career ==
Born in Kulmbach, Bavaria, Haase began racing in 2006 in the ADAC Dacia Logan Cup, before moving to the ADAC GT Masters series in 2007, which he won for Reiter Engineering. The following season, he remained in the series and finished second, in addition to winning the GT4 European Cup. After winning the 2009 FIA GT3 European title with Phoenix Racing and Christopher Mies, the German proceeded to compete in the FIA GT1 World Championship in 2010.

Having become an Audi factory driver in 2011, Haase entered the Blancpain Endurance Series in 2012, winning it for Team WRT alongside Mies and Stéphane Ortelli. He spent two seasons in the IMSA SportsCar Championship in 2014 and 2015 with Paul Miller Racing, scoring eight podiums and a win at Petit Le Mans. From 2016 onwards, Haase split his attention between the Blancpain Endurance and Blancpain Sprint Series, driving for Saintéloc Racing until 2021. That year also saw him make his DTM debut, competing for Team Rosberg at the Nürburgring.

In 2022, Haase switched to Tresor by Car Collection, with whom he would take third in the GTWC Europe Sprint Cup, his best placing in the championship. Subsequently, Haase drove for Comtoyou Racing in both series before moving to Tresor Attempto Racing in 2024. Despite not scoring a podium with Attempto Racing in the 2024 GT World Challenge Europe Endurance Cup, Haase finished third in the standings alongside Ricardo Feller and Alex Aka. Haase also contested the 2024 International GT Open with Eastalent Racing Team, where he guided the team and teammate Simon Reicher to the title. He and Reicher returned to the series in 2025, finishing third overall. Haase continued with Reicher for Eastalent's graduation to the GT World Challenge Europe in 2026, which he described as "the Formula One of GT racing".

In March 2026, Haase gained notoriety during round two of the Nürburgring Langstrecken-Serie—driving for Scherer Sport PHX, Haase took the lead from four-time Formula One World Drivers' Champion Max Verstappen on the first lap and defended it throughout the opening hour, eventually being overtaken just before both cars entered the pits. Talking to the media after his stint, Haase said he enjoyed the battle, stating "those are exactly the duels we live for in the sport". Haase returned to battle Verstappen for the lead in the second qualifying race for the Nürburgring 24 Hours, before winning the event as Verstappen's car fell behind with front splitter damage.

== Racing record ==
=== Racing career summary ===
Season	Series	Team	Races	Wins	Poles	F/Laps	Podiums	Points	Position
2006	ADAC Dacia Logan Cup		?	?	?	?	?	?	**3rd**
2007	ADAC GT Masters	Reiter Engineering	12	5	?	?	8	79	**1st**
2007	FIA GT3 European Championship	S-Berg Racing	2	0	0	0	0	0	NC
2007	FIA GT3 European Championship	First Racing	2	0	0	0	0	0	NC
2008	ADAC GT Masters	Reiter Engineering	14	2	0	0	6	73	**2nd**
2008	GT4 European Cup Sports Light	Reiter Engineering	9	3	?	?	9	134	**1st**
2008	FIA GT3 European Championship	Tech9 Motorsport	4	0	1	0	1	13	16th
2009	FIA GT3 European Championship	Phoenix Racing	11	3	1	0	5	54.5	**1st**
2009	ADAC GT Masters	Phoenix Racing	8	3	0	1	3	40	9th
2010	FIA GT1 World Championship	Reiter Engineering	18	0	0	0	3	39	18th
2010	ADAC GT Masters	Team Rosberg	4	0	0	0	0	12	20th
2010	Malaysia Merdeka Endurance Race	Arrows Racing	1	1	?	?	1	N/A	**1st**
2011	ADAC GT Masters	Phoenix Racing Pole Promotion	16	1	0	0	2	70	14th
2011	FIA GT3 European Championship	Belgian Audi Club Team WRT	2	1	1	1	1	25	21st
2011	FIA GT1 World Championship	DKR www-discount.de	2	0	0	0	1	18	21st
2011	Blancpain GT Endurance Series	Audi Sport Team Phoenix	1	0	0	0	0	12.5	24th
2011	24 Hours of the Nürburgring - SP9	Audi Sport Team Phoenix	1	0	?	?	1	N/A	**2nd**
2012	Blancpain GT Endurance Series	Belgian Audi Club Team WRT	6	1	0	0	4	114	**1st**
2012	ADAC GT Masters	Mamerow Racing	1	0	0	0	0	0	NC
2012	24 Hours of the Nürburgring - SP9	Audi Sport Team Phoenix	1	1	0	0	1	N/A	**1st**
2013	Blancpain GT Endurance Series	Phoenix Racing	5	0	0	0	0	24	17th
2013	ADAC GT Masters	Prosperia C. Abt Racing	11	0	0	0	0	5	31st
2013	VLN Langstrecken Serie - SP9	Belgian Audi Club Team WRT	3	0	?	?	2	0	NC†
2013	24 Hours of the Nürburgring - SP9	Belgian Audi Club Team WRT	1	0	0	0	0	N/A	DNF
2013	Grand Am Series - GT	Audi Sport Customer Racing	1	0	0	0	0	24	54th
2014	IMSA SportsCar Championship - GTD	Paul Miller Racing	11	1	1	3	4	295	**2nd**
2014	VLN Langstrecken Serie - SP9	Phoenix Racing	2	0	0	0	1	5	60th
2014	24 Hours of the Nürburgring - SP9	Phoenix Racing	1	1	0	0	1	N/A	**1st**
2014	Super GT - GT300	Audi Team Hitotsuyama	1	0	0	0	0	0	NC
2015	IMSA SportsCar Championship - GTD	Paul Miller Racing	10	0	0	1	4	277	**3rd**
2015	Blancpain GT Endurance Series	Phoenix Racing	2	0	0	0	0	0	NC
2015	Bathurst 12 Hour - GT3 Pro-Am	Phoenix Racing	1	0	0	0	0	N/A	7th
2015	VLN Langstrecken Serie - SP9	Audi Sport Team Phoenix	1	0	0	0	0	0	NC†
2015	24 Hours of the Nürburgring - SP9	Audi Sport Team Phoenix	1	0	0	0	0	N/A	DNF
2015	12 Hours of Sepang - GT3	Belgian Audi Club Team WRT	1	0	0	0	1	N/A	**2nd**
2015	Australian GT Championship	Jamec Pem Racing	2	0	1	0	0	0	NC
2015	Highlands 101 - NZ- Sports Car	Jamec Pem Racing	1	0	0	0	0	0	NC
2015	French GT Championship	Saintéloc Racing	4	0	0	1	0	6	35th
2016	Blancpain GT Series Endurance Cup	Saintéloc Racing	5	0	0	0	0	21	14th
2016	Blancpain GT Series Sprint Cup	Saintéloc Racing	8	0	0	0	0	17	16th
2016	ADAC GT Masters	Car Collection Motorsport	10	0	0	1	0	48	17th
2016	ADAC GT Masters	Montaplast by Land-Motorsport	4	0	0	0	0	48	17th
2016	VLN Langstrecken Serie - SP9	Audi Sport Team Phoenix	1	0	0	0	1	0	NC†
2016	24 Hours of Nürburgring - SP9	Audi Sport Team Phoenix	1	0	0	0	0	N/A	DNF
2016	Intercontinental GT Challenge	Melbourne Performance Centre	1	0	0	0	0	25	7th
2016	Intercontinental GT Challenge	Audi Sport Team Phoenix	1	1	0	0	1	25	7th
2016	IMSA SportsCar Championship - GTD	Flying Lizard Motorsports	1	0	0	0	0	0	NC
2016–17	Asian Le Mans Series	TianShi Racing Team	1	0	0	0	0	0	22nd
2017	Blancpain GT Series Endurance Cup	Saintéloc Racing	5	1	0	0	1	30	8th
2017	Blancpain GT Series Sprint Cup	Saintéloc Racing	8	0	0	0	0	16	17th
2017	ADAC GT Masters	Montaplast by Land-Motorsport	13	0	0	1	4	91	9th
2017	Intercontinental GT Challenge	Jamec Pem Racing	1	0	0	0	0	44	**2nd**
2017	Intercontinental GT Challenge	Audi Sport Team Saintéloc	1	1	0	0	1	44	**2nd**
2017	Intercontinental GT Challenge	Audi Sport Team Land	1	0	1	0	1	44	**2nd**
2017	VLN Nürburgring Series - SPX	Car Collection Motorsport	1	1	0	0	1	0	NC†
2017	VLN Nürburgring Series - SP9	Audi Sport Team Land	2	0	0	0	0	0	NC†
2017	24 Hours of Nürburgring - SP9	Audi Sport Team Land	1	0	0	0	0	N/A	DNF
2017	24H Series - A6	Optimum Motorsport	1	0	0	0	0	24	NC†
2018	Blancpain GT Series Endurance Cup	Saintéloc Racing	5	0	0	0	0	27	18th
2018	Blancpain GT Series Sprint Cup	Saintéloc Racing	10	0	0	0	3	44.5	8th
2018	ADAC GT Masters	BWT Mücke Motorsport	14	0	0	0	0	45	13th
2018	Intercontinental GT Challenge	Audi Sport Team MPC	1	0	0	0	0	65	**2nd**
2018	Intercontinental GT Challenge	Audi Sport Team Saintéloc	1	1	0	0	1	65	**2nd**
2018	Intercontinental GT Challenge	Audi Sport Team Absolute Racing	1	0	0	0	1	65	**2nd**
2018	Intercontinental GT Challenge	Audi Sport Team Land	1	1	0	0	1	65	**2nd**
2018	Gulf 12 Hours - GT3	Car Collection Motorsport	1	0	0	0	1	N/A	**2nd**
2018	VLN Langstrecken Serie - SP9	Audi Sport Team Phoenix	2	0	0	0	0	0	NC†
2018	24 Hours of Nürburgring - SP9	Audi Sport Team Phoenix	1	0	0	0	0	N/A	7th
2018	24H Series - Europe - A6	Optimum Motorsport	1	0	0	0	0	0	NC†
2018	24H Series - Europe - A6	Car Collection Motorsport	1	0	0	1	0	0	NC†
2018	FIA GT World Cup	Audi Sport Team Rutronik	2	0	0	0	0	N/A	6th
2019	Blancpain GT Series Endurance Cup	Saintéloc Racing	5	0	0	0	0	14	18th
2019	GT World Challenge Europe	Saintéloc Racing	10	1	1	0	4	61	5th
2019	ADAC GT Masters	BWT Mücke Motorsport	12	0	0	1	1	59	19th
2019	Intercontinental GT Challenge	Audi Sport Team Valvoline	1	0	0	0	0	46	10th
2019	Intercontinental GT Challenge	Audi Sport Team WRT	1	0	0	0	0	46	10th
2019	Intercontinental GT Challenge	Audi Sport Team Saintéloc	1	0	0	0	1	46	10th
2019	Intercontinental GT Challenge	Audi Sport Team Absolute Racing	1	0	0	0	0	46	10th
2019	Intercontinental GT Challenge	Audi Sport Team Land	1	0	0	0	0	46	10th
2019	IMSA SportsCar Championship - GTD	Starworks Motorsport	1	0	0	0	0	18	61st
2019	24H GT Series - A6	Car Collection Motorsport	1	1	0	0	1	0	NC†
2019	VLN Langstrecken Serie - SP9	Audi Sport Team Car Collection	1	0	0	0	0	5.48	65th
2019	24 Hours of Nürburgring - SP9	Audi Sport Team Car Collection	1	0	0	0	1	N/A	**3rd**
2019	FIA GT World Cup	Phoenix Racing	2	0	0	0	0	N/A	5th
2020	GT World Challenge Europe Endurance Cup	Saintéloc Racing	4	0	0	0	0	22	15th
2020	GT World Challenge Europe Sprint Cup	Saintéloc Racing	10	0	0	0	3	52.5	7th
2020	ADAC GT Masters	Montaplast by Land-Motorsport	14	1	0	0	3	127	5th
2020	Intercontinental GT Challenge	Audi Sport Team Valvoline	1	0	0	0	0	20	11th
2020	Intercontinental GT Challenge	Audi Sport Team Saintéloc Racing	1	0	0	0	0	20	11th
2020	Intercontinental GT Challenge	Audi Sport Team Car Collection	1	0	0	0	0	20	11th
2020	Nürburgring Langstrecken-Serie - SP9	Audi Sport Team Car Collection	3	0	0	0	2	22.34	16th
2020	24 Hours of Nürburgring - SP9	Audi Sport Team Car Collection	1	0	0	0	1	N/A	**2nd**
2020	24H Series - GT3 Pro	Car Collection Motorsport	1	0	0	0	1	28	4th
2021	GT World Challenge Europe Endurance Cup	Saintéloc Racing	5	0	0	0	0	8	24th
2021	GT World Challenge Europe Sprint Cup	Saintéloc Racing	10	0	0	0	2	23.5	11th
2021	ADAC GT Masters	Montaplast by Land-Motorsport	14	0	0	0	0	28	26th
2021	Intercontinental GT Challenge	Audi Sport Team Saintéloc Racing	2	1	0	0	1	47	4th
2021	Intercontinental GT Challenge	Audi Sport Team WRT	1	0	0	0	0	47	4th
2021	Nürburgring Langstrecken-Serie - SP9 Pro-Am	Audi Sport Team Car Collection	1	0	0	0	0	0	NC†
2021	24 Hours of Nürburgring - SP9	Audi Sport Team Car Collection	1	0	0	0	0	N/A	5th
2021	Deutsche Tourenwagen Masters	Team Rosberg	2	0	0	1	0	1	21st
2022	GT World Challenge Europe Endurance Cup	Tresor by Car Collection	5	0	0	0	0	12	24th
2022	GT World Challenge Europe Sprint Cup	Tresor by Car Collection	10	1	0	0	5	67	**3rd**
2022	ADAC GT Masters	Montaplast by Land-Motorsport	11	0	0	0	0	20	28th
2022	Intercontinental GT Challenge	Audi Sport Team Saintéloc	1	0	0	0	1	15	15th
2022	Nürburgring Langstrecken-Serie - SP9	Audi Sport Team Car Collection	1	0	0	0	0	0	NC†
2022	24 Hours of Nürburgring - SP9	Audi Sport Team Car Collection	1	0	0	0	0	N/A	4th
2023	GT World Challenge Europe Endurance Cup	Comtoyou Racing	5	0	0	0	0	8	19th
2023	GT World Challenge Europe Sprint Cup	Comtoyou Racing	10	0	0	1	2	50	6th
2023	International GT Open	Eastalent Racing	13	1	2	1	7	119	**2nd**
2023	Nürburgring Langstrecken-Serie - SP9	Audi Sport Team Land	2	0	0	0	1	0	NC†
2023	24 Hours of Nürburgring - SP9	Audi Sport Team Land	1	0	0	0	0	N/A	6th
2023	FIA GT World Cup	Audi Sport Asia Team Absolute	2	0	0	0	0	N/A	7th
2023–24	Asian Le Mans Series - GT	Saintéloc Racing	5	1	0	0	2	57	4th
2023–24	Middle East Trophy - GT3	Eastalent Racing Team	1	1	0	0	1	0	NC†
2024	GT World Challenge Europe Endurance Cup	Tresor Attempto Racing	5	0	0	0	0	60	**3rd**
2024	International GT Open	Eastalent Racing Team	14	4	1	1	7	124	**1st**
2024	Nürburgring Langstrecken-Serie - SP9	Scherer Sport PHX	2	0	0	0	0	0	NC†
2024	24 Hours of Nürburgring - SP9	Scherer Sport PHX	1	0	0	0	0	N/A	8th
2024	GT World Challenge Europe Sprint Cup	Tresor Attempto Racing	4	0	0	0	0	1.5	20th
2024	GT World Challenge Europe Sprint Cup	Eastalent Racing	2	0	0	0	0	1.5	20th
2024	FIA GT World Cup	Phantom Global Racing	1	0	0	0	0	N/A	6th
2025	International GT Open	Eastalent Racing Team	14	1	2	1	7	134	**3rd**
2025	Nürburgring Langstrecken-Serie - SP9	Scherer Sport PHX	2	0	0	0	0	0	NC†
2025	24 Hours of Nürburgring - SP9	Scherer Sport PHX	1	0	0	0	0	N/A	DNF
2025	FIA GT World Cup	FAW Audi Sport Asia Team Phantom	1	0	0	0	0	N/A	7th
2025–26	24H Series Middle East - GT3	Team WRT							
2026	GT World Challenge Europe Endurance Cup	Eastalent Racing	5	0	0	0	0	12	22nd
2026	GT World Challenge Europe Sprint Cup	Eastalent Racing	10	0	0	0	0	8	24th
2026	Nürburgring Langstrecken-Serie - SP9	Scherer Sport PHX							
2026	24 Hours of Nürburgring - SP9	Scherer Sport PHX	1	0	0	0	0	N/A	DNF

^{*} Season still in progress.^{†} As Haase was a guest driver, he was ineligible for points.

=== Complete 24 Hours of Nürburgring results ===
Year	Team	Co-Drivers	Car	Class	Laps	Pos.	Class Pos.
2009	(Germany) MSC Rhön AvD	(Germany) Benedikt Frey (Germany) Christian Leutheuser (Germany) Hubert Nacken	BMW M3 E46	SP5	136	24th	**1st**
2010		(Germany) Christoph Koslowski (Germany) Stephan Rösler (Germany) Heinz Schmersal	BMW Z4 M Coupe	SP6	127	56th	**3rd**
2011	(Germany) Audi Sport Team Phoenix	(Germany) Marc Hennerici (Germany) Frank Stippler (Germany) Markus Winkelhock	Audi R8 LMS	SP9 GT3	155	4th	**2nd**
2012	(Germany) Audi Sport Team Phoenix	(Germany) Marc Basseng (Germany) Frank Stippler (Germany) Markus Winkelhock	Audi R8 LMS Ultra	SP9 GT3	155	**1st**	**1st**
2013	(Belgium) Belgian Audi Club Team WRT	(Germany) Christopher Mies (Sweden) Edward Sandström (Belgium) Laurens Vanthoor	Audi R8 LMS Ultra	SP9 GT3	44	DNF	DNF
2014	(Germany) Phoenix Racing	(Germany) Christian Mamerow (Germany) René Rast (Germany) Markus Winkelhock	Audi R8 LMS Ultra	SP9 GT3	159	**1st**	**1st**
2015	(Germany) Audi Sport Team Phoenix	(Germany) Christian Mamerow (Germany) René Rast (Germany) Markus Winkelhock	Audi R8 LMS	SP9 GT3	59	DNF	DNF
2016	(Germany) Audi Sport Team Phoenix	(Germany) René Rast (Germany) Markus Winkelhock (Germany) Frank Stippler	Audi R8 LMS	SP9	67	DNF	DNF
2017	(Germany) Audi Sport Team Land / Land-Motorsport	(United States) Connor De Phillippi (Germany) Christopher Mies (Germany) Pierre Kaffer	Audi R8 LMS	SP9	113	DNF	DNF
2018	(Germany) Audi Sport Team Phoenix	(Switzerland) Nico Müller (Germany) Frank Stippler (Belgium) Frédéric Vervisch	Audi R8 LMS	SP9	133	7th	6th
2018	(Germany) Audi Sport Team BWT	(Switzerland) Nico Müller (Germany) Mike Rockenfeller (Germany) Markus Winkelhock	Audi R8 LMS	SP9	131	12th	11th
2019	(Germany) Audi Sport Team Car Collection	(Switzerland) Marcel Fässler (Germany) René Rast (Germany) Markus Winkelhock	Audi R8 LMS Evo	SP9	156	**3rd**	**3rd**
2019	(Germany) Audi Sport Team Land	(Germany) Christopher Mies (Germany) René Rast (South Africa) Kelvin van der Linde	Audi R8 LMS Evo	SP9	139	DNF	DNF
2020	(Germany) Audi Sport Team Car Collection	(Italy) Mirko Bortolotti (Netherlands) Robin Frijns (Germany) Markus Winkelhock	Audi R8 LMS Evo	SP9 PRO	85	**2nd**	**2nd**
2021	(Germany) Audi Sport Team Car Collection	(Switzerland) Nico Müller (Switzerland) Patric Niederhauser (Germany) Markus Winkelhock	Audi R8 LMS Evo	SP9 PRO	59	5th	5th
2022	(Germany) Audi Sport Team Car Collection	(Switzerland) Nico Müller (Switzerland) Patric Niederhauser (Germany) René Rast	Audi R8 LMS Evo II	SP9 PRO	159	4th	4th
2023	(Germany) Audi Sport Team Land	(Germany) Christopher Mies (Switzerland) Patric Niederhauser	Audi R8 LMS Evo II	SP9 PRO	161	6th	6th
2024	(Germany) Scherer Sport PHX	(Switzerland) Ricardo Feller (Belgium) Frédéric Vervisch (Germany) Markus Winkelhock	Audi R8 LMS Evo II	SP9 PRO	50	8th	8th
2025	(Germany) Scherer Sport PHX	(Germany) Luca Ludwig (Germany) Markus Winkelhock	Audi R8 LMS Evo II	SP9 PRO	28	DNF	DNF
2026	(Germany) Scherer Sport PHX	(United Kingdom) Ben Green (United Kingdom) Alexander Sims	Audi R8 LMS Evo II	SP9 PRO	16	DNF	DNF

=== Complete FIA GT1 World Championship results ===
Year	Team	Car	1	2	3	4	5	6	7	8	9	10	11	12	13	14	15	16	17	18	19	20	Pos	Points
2010	Reiter	Lamborghini Murciélago LP670 R-SV	ABU; QR; 15	ABU; CR; 8	SIL; QR; 10	SIL; CR; Ret	BRN; QR; DNS	BRN; CR; DNS	PRI; QR; 2	PRI; CR; 18	SPA; QR; 7	SPA; CR; Ret	NÜR; QR; 3	NÜR; CR; 2	ALG; QR; 12	ALG; CR; 7	NAV; QR; 17	NAV; CR; Ret	INT; QR; 9	INT; CR; 12	SAN; QR; Ret	SAN; CR; 10	18th	39
2011	DKR www-discount.de	Lamborghini Murciélago LP670 R-SV	ABU; QR	ABU; CR	ZOL; QR	ZOL; CR	ALG; QR	ALG; QR	SAC; QR	SAC; CR	SIL; QR	SIL; CR	NAV; QR	NAV; CR	PRI; QR	PRI; CR	ORD; QR	ORD; CR	BEI; QR	BEI; CR	SAN; QR; 9	SAN; CR; 2	21st	18

=== Complete GT World Challenge Europe results ===
==== GT World Challenge Europe Endurance Cup ====
(Races in bold indicate pole position) (Races in italics indicate fastest lap)

Year	Team	Car	Class	1	2	3	4	5	6	7	8	Pos.	Points
2011	Audi Sport Team Phoenix	Audi R8 LMS	Pro	MNZ	NAV	SPA; 6H; 1	SPA; 12H; 34	SPA; 24H; Ret	MAG	SIL		24th	12.5
2012	Belgian Audi Club WRT	Audi R8 LMS ultra	Pro	MNZ; 7	SIL; 3	LEC; 1	SPA; 6H; 2	SPA; 12H; 2	SPA; 24H; 2	NÜR; 4	NAV; 2	1st	114
2013	Phoenix Racing	Audi R8 LMS ultra	Pro	MNZ; 9	SIL; 12	LEC; 17	SPA; 24H; 13	SPA; 24H; 9	SPA; 24H; 4	NÜR; 10		17th	24
2015	Phoenix Racing	Audi R8 LMS	Pro	MNZ; 21	SIL	LEC; 20	SPA; 6H	SPA; 12H	SPA; 24H	NÜR		NC	0
2016	Saintéloc Racing	Audi R8 LMS ultra	Pro	MNZ; 12	SIL; 7	LEC; 6	SPA; 6H; 11	SPA; 12H; 13	SPA; 24H; 7	NÜR; 17		14th	21
2017	Saintéloc Racing	Audi R8 LMS	Pro	MNZ; Ret	SIL; 36	LEC; 9	SPA; 6H; 7	SPA; 12H; 13	SPA; 24H; 1	BAR; 17		8th	30
2018	Saintéloc Racing	Audi R8 LMS	Pro	MNZ; 14	SIL; Ret	LEC; 6	SPA; 6H; 16	SPA; 12H; 4	SPA; 24H; 4	BAR; 44		18th	27
2019	Saintéloc Racing	Audi R8 LMS Evo	Pro	MNZ; 15	SIL; 11	LEC; 9	SPA; 6H; 12	SPA; 12H; 10	SPA; 24H; 4	BAR; Ret		18th	14
2020	Saintéloc Racing	Audi R8 LMS Evo	Pro	IMO; 5	NÜR; 9	SPA; 6H; 15	SPA; 12H; 8	SPA; 24H; 6	LEC; 12			15th	22
2021	Saintéloc Racing	Audi R8 LMS Evo	Pro	MNZ	LEC	SPA; 6H; 17	SPA; 12H; 11	SPA; 24H; 6	NÜR; 41	CAT; 24		24th	8
2022	Tresor by Car Collection	Audi R8 LMS Evo II	Pro	IMO; 4	LEC; 12	SPA; 6H; 62	SPA; 12H; 62	SPA; 24H; Ret	HOC; 38	CAT; 42		24th	12
2023	Comtoyou Racing	Audi R8 LMS Evo II	Pro	MNZ; Ret	LEC; 42	SPA; 6H; 18	SPA; 12H; 16	SPA; 24H; 8	NÜR; 8	CAT; 49		19th	8
2024	Tresor Attempto Racing	Audi R8 LMS Evo II	Pro	LEC; 6	SPA; 6H; 3	SPA; 12H; 1	SPA; 24H; 12	NÜR; 4	MNZ; 4	JED; 6		3rd	60
2026	Eastalent Racing	Audi R8 LMS Evo II	Pro	LEC; 15	MNZ; 20	SPA; 6H; 1	SPA; 12H; 51	SPA; 24H; Ret	NÜR; Ret	ALG; Ret		22nd	12

* Season still in progress.

==== GT World Challenge Europe Sprint Cup ====
(Races in bold indicate pole position) (Races in italics indicate fastest lap)

Year	Team	Car	Class	1	2	3	4	5	6	7	8	9	10	Pos.	Points
2016	Saintéloc Racing	Audi R8 LMS	Pro	MIS; 1; 11	MIS; 2 Ret	BRH; 1; 11	BRH; 2; 6	NUR; 1; 31	NUR; 2; 14	HUN; 1; 6	HUN; 2; 6	CAT; 1	CAT; 2	16th	17
2017	Saintéloc Racing	Audi R8 LMS	Pro	MIS; 1; 6	MIS; 2; 14	BRH; 1 Ret	BRH; 2; 14	ZOL; 1; 31	ZOL; 2; 14	HUN; 1; 10	HUN; 2; 9	NÜR; 1	NÜR; 2	17th	16
2018	Saintéloc Racing	Audi R8 LMS	Pro	ZOL; 1; 10	ZOL; 2; 12	BRH; 1; 7	BRH; 2; 8	MIS; 1 Ret	MIS; 2; 3	HUN; 1; 4	HUN; 2; 2	NUR; 1; 10	NUR; 2; 3	8th	44.5
2019	Saintéloc Racing	Audi R8 LMS Evo	Pro	BRH; 1; 16	BRH; 2; 7	MIS; 1 Ret	MIS; 2; 3	ZAN; 1; 10	ZAN; 2; 1	NUR; 1; 3	NUR; 2; 2	HUN; 1; 6	HUN; 2; 6	5th	61
2020	Saintéloc Racing	Audi R8 LMS Evo	Pro	MIS; 1; 5	MIS; 2; 3	MIS; 3; 2	MAG; 1; 9	MAG; 2; 5	ZAN; 1 Ret	ZAN; 2; 2	CAT; 1; 14	CAT; 2; 5	CAT; 3 Ret	7th	52.5
2021	Saintéloc Racing	Audi R8 LMS Evo	Pro	MAG; 1 Ret	MAG; 2; 10	ZAN; 1; 11	ZAN; 2; 16	MIS; 1; 3	MIS; 2 Ret	BRH; 1; 10	BRH; 2; 10	VAL; 1; 2	VAL; 2; 10	11th	23.5
2022	Tresor by Car Collection	Audi R8 LMS Evo II	Pro	BRH; 1; 7	BRH; 2; 4	MAG; 1; 3	MAG; 2 Ret	ZAN; 1; 3	ZAN; 2 Ret	MIS; 1; 4	MIS; 2; 3	VAL; 1; 2	VAL; 2; 4	3rd	67
2023	Comtoyou Racing	Audi R8 LMS Evo II	Pro	BRH; 1; 4	BRH; 2; 5	MIS; 1; 9	MIS; 2; 2	HOC; 1; 7	HOC; 2; 2	VAL; 1; 4	VAL; 2; 9	ZAN; 1 Ret	ZAN; 2; 12	6th	50
2024	Tresor Attempto Racing	Audi R8 LMS Evo II	Pro	BRH; 1; 17	BRH; 2; 16	MIS; 1; 12	MIS; 2; 12	HOC; 1	HOC; 2					20th	1.5
2024	Eastalent Racing	Audi R8 LMS Evo II	Pro							MAG; 1; 10	MAG; 2; 9	CAT; 1	CAT; 2	20th	1.5
2026	Eastalent Racing	Audi R8 LMS Evo II	Pro	BRH; 1; 23	BRH; 2; 17	MIS; 1; 8	MIS; 2; 35	MAG; 1 Ret	MAG; 2; 5	ZAN; 1; 21	ZAN; 2 Ret	CAT; 1; 14	CAT; 2; 14	24th	8

=== Complete IMSA SportsCar Championship results ===
(key) (Races in bold indicate pole position; results in italics indicate fastest lap)

Year	Entrant	Class	Chassis	Engine	1	2	3	4	5	6	7	8	9	10	11	Pos.	Points
2014	Paul Miller Racing	GTD	Audi R8 LMS ultra	Audi CJJ 5.2 V10	DAY; 16	SEB; 12	LGA; 2	DET; 3	WGL; 8	MOS; 8	IMS; 2	ELK; 11	VIR; 4	COA; 6	PET; 1	2nd	295
2015	Paul Miller Racing	GTD	Audi R8 LMS ultra	Audi CJJ 5.2 V10	DAY; 5	SEB; 5	LGA; 2	DET; 3	**WGL**; 3	**LIM**; 10	ELK; 6	**VIR**; 5	**COA**; 3	PET; 10		3rd	277
2016	Flying Lizard Motorsports	GTD	Audi R8 LMS ultra	Audi CJJ 5.2 V10	DAY; 19†	SEB	LGA	DET	WGL	MOS	LIM	ELK	VIR	COA	PET	65th	1
2019	Starworks Motorsport	GTD	Audi R8 LMS Evo	Audi DAR 5.2 V10	DAY; 13	SEB	MDO	DET	WGL	MOS	LIM	ELK	VIR	LGA	PET	61st	18

=== Complete Super GT Series results ===
(key) (Races in bold indicate pole position) (Races in italics indicate fastest lap)

Year	Team	Car	Class	1	2	3	4	5	6	7	8	DC	Points
2014	Audi Team Hitotsuyama	Audi R8 LMS ultra	GT300	OKA	FUJ	AUT	SUG	FUJ	SUZ; Ret	BUR	MOT	NC	0

=== Complete Bathurst 12 Hour results ===
Year	Team	Co-drivers	Car	Class	Laps	Ovr. Pos.	Cla. Pos.
2015	(Germany) Phoenix Racing	(Austria) Felix Baumgartner (Monaco) Stéphane Ortelli	Audi R8 LMS Ultra	Pro	268	9th	8th
2016	(Australia) Melbourne Performance Centre	(Italy) Marco Mapelli (Germany) Christopher Mies	Audi R8 LMS	Pro	50	DNF	
2017	(Australia) Melbourne Performance Centre	(Germany) Christopher Mies (Australia) Garth Tander	Audi R8 LMS	Pro	282	13th	6th
2018	(Australia) Melbourne Performance Centre	(Germany) Christopher Mies (Germany) Markus Winkelhock	Audi R8 LMS	Pro	238	DNF	
2019	(Australia) Melbourne Performance Centre	(Germany) Christopher Mies (Germany) Markus Winkelhock	Audi R8 LMS	Pro	304	14th	9th
2020	(Australia) Melbourne Performance Centre	(Belgium) Dries Vanthoor (Belgium) Frédéric Vervisch	Audi R8 LMS Evo	Pro	148	DNF	
2023	(Australia) Melbourne Performance Centre	(Italy) Mattia Drudi (Switzerland) Patric Niederhauser	Audi R8 LMS Evo II	Pro	13	DNF	
2024	(Australia) Melbourne Performance Centre	(Australia) Liam Talbot (South Africa) Kelvin van der Linde	Audi R8 LMS Evo II	Pro	275	**3rd**	**3rd**
2026	(Australia) Jamec Racing Team MPC	(Australia) Will Brown (Australia) Brad Schumacher	Audi R8 LMS Evo II	Pro	262	4th	**3rd**

=== Complete Asian Le Mans Series results ===
(key) (Races in bold indicate pole position) (Races in italics indicate fastest lap)

Year	Team	Class	Car	Engine	1	2	3	4	5	Pos.	Points
2016–17	TianShi Racing Team	GT	Audi R8 LMS Ultra	Audi CJJ 5.2 L V10	ZHU; Ret	FUJ	BUR	SEP		22nd	0
2023–24	Saintéloc Racing	GT	Audi R8 LMS Evo II	Audi DAR 5.2 L V10	**SEP**; **1**; 1	SEP; 2; 2	DUB; Ret	ABU; 1; 10	ABU; 2; 4	4th	57

=== Complete Deutsche Tourenwagen Masters results ===
(key) (Races in bold indicate pole position) (Races in italics indicate fastest lap)

Year	Team	Car	1	2	3	4	5	6	7	8	9	10	11	12	13	14	15	16	Pos	Points
2021	Team Rosberg	Audi R8 LMS Evo	MNZ; 1	MNZ; 2	LAU; 1	LAU; 2	ZOL; 1	ZOL; 2	NÜR; 1 Ret	NÜR; 2; 10	RBR; 1	RBR; 2	ASS; 1	ASS; 2	HOC; 1	HOC; 2	NOR; 1	NOR; 2	21st	1

=== Complete International GT Open results ===
(key) (Races in bold indicate pole position) (Races in italics indicate fastest lap)

Year	Team	Car	Class	1	2	3	4	5	6	7	8	9	10	11	12	13	14	Pos.	Points
2023	Eastalent Racing	Audi R8 LMS Evo II	Pro	ALG; 1; 4	ALG; 2; 3	**SPA**; 2	HUN; 1; 2	**HUN**; **2** Ret	LEC; 1 Ret	LEC; 2; 2	RBR; 1; 5	RBR; 2; 3	MNZ; 1; 2	MNZ; 2; 6	CAT; 1; 1	CAT; 2; 6		2nd	119
2024	Eastalent Racing	Audi R8 LMS Evo II	Pro	ALG; 1; 10	ALG; 2; 4	HOC; 1 Ret	**HOC**; **2**; 1	SPA; 8	HUN; 1; 1	HUN; 2; 28†	LEC; 1; 1	LEC; 2; 2	RBR; 1; 9	RBR; 2; 1	CAT; 1; 10	CAT; 2; 3	MNZ; 2	1st	124
2025	Eastalent Racing	Audi R8 LMS Evo II	Pro	ALG; 1; 2	ALG; 2; 5	SPA; 2	HOC; 1; 2	HOC; 2; 2	HUN; 1; 5	**HUN**; **2**; 1	LEC; 1; 26†	LEC; 2; 6	RBR; 1; 3	RBR; 2; 18	CAT; 1; 2	**CAT**; **2**; 7	MNZ; 4	3rd	134

Sporting positions
Preceded by None	ADAC GT Masters Champion; 2007	Succeeded by Tim Bergmeister
Preceded by James Ruffier; Arnaud Peyroles	FIA GT3 European Champion; 2009 with: Christopher Mies	Succeeded by Christian Hohenadel; Daniel Keilwitz
Preceded by Greg Franchi	Blancpain Endurance Series champion 2012; With: Christopher Mies; Stéphane Ortelli	Succeeded by Maximilian Buhk
Preceded by Charlie Fagg; Sam De Haan	International GT Open; Champion; 2024; With: Simon Reicher	Succeeded by Levente Révész
