= Tobias Blättler =

Swiss racing driver (born 1981)

Tobias Blättler (born 11 October 1981, in Lucerne, Switzerland) is a Swiss professional race car driver. As a Formula Three driver, he is a two time vice-champion in this class in Switzerland 2003 and in Austria 2004.

Like many successful race car drivers, Blättler first got into racing in 1993 karting in Europe until 1999. Since 2000, he drove in the competitive Swiss Formula Three, where he became vice-champion in 2003. In 2004, he drove in the Austrian Formula Three and became vice-champion again. In 2005, he was a test-driver in the American Formula Atlantic Series, the European F3000 Series and he participated in the German Formula Three Recaro Trophy, where he held four pole positions and won two races (Assen and Nürburgring).

Since 2007, Blättler competed in several GT and Sportscar series races.
