= ADAC GT Masters =

Auto racing championship in Germany

- Category: Grand Touring racing
- Region: International
- Inaugural season: 2007
- Drivers: 56 (2024)
- Teams: 17 (2024)
- Constructors: Various
- Tyre suppliers: Pirelli
- Drivers' champion: (Germany) Salman Owega (Germany) Finn Wiebelhaus
- Teams' champion: (Germany) Haupt Racing Team
- Official website: Official website

The ADAC GT Masters is a grand tourer-based auto racing series founded by the international Stéphane Ratel Organisation (SRO) and supported by the German ADAC automotive club. Similar to an earlier ADAC GT Cup series in the 1990s, the new GT Masters ran their first season in 2007. Although the series is based in Germany, select events are run elsewhere in Europe.

== ADAC GT Cup ==
The original ADAC GT Cup was created in 1993, as a national grand tourer championship similar to the Deutsche Tourenwagen Meisterschaft (DTM). The series initially used two divisions, with the upper class running a variety of sports cars, and the smaller class for small coupes. Following dwindling support for the top division, the two classes were combined in 1995. By 1997, the series continued to dwindle, as the series was running only small coupes instead of high powered sports cars. The championship was officially cancelled after the 1997 season as most teams turned to the VLN championship.

== Competition ==
The ADAC GT Masters uses a similar formula to the one used in the FIA GT3 European Championship, also created by the SRO. The ADAC GT Masters is a "PRO-AM" Championship in which a professional driver shares a car with an amateur driver. The exact criteria for what determines an amateur driver and professional driver is laid out by the Fédération Internationale de l'Automobile (FIA). Drivers run in pairs, with each race requiring the team to make a pit stop and swap drivers.

The cars that run in the ADAC GT Masters are also regulated by the FIA. Only cars which have been approved are allowed to compete. Of the cars that are currently approved, all are artificially performance balanced in such a way that the performance of each type of car is as close to equal as possible. This makes the skills of the driver paramount. Vehicles that ran in the 2019 championship include Porsche 911 GT3 R, Audi R8 LMS GT3 Evo, Ferrari 488 GT3, Corvette C7 GT3-R, BMW M6 GT3, Lamborghini Huracan GT3, Mercedes-AMG GT3, Aston Martin Vantage GT3, Honda NSX GT3 EVO.

Each event consists of two races, with a duration of 60 minutes plus one lap. Each car must make a pit stop during each race and switch drivers. In the first race usually the amateur driver starts, if so the professional driver must drive the start in the second race of each round.

The current driver champions are Elias Seppänen and Tom Kalender in the No 1 Mercedes-AMG GT3.

== Circuits ==
- (Germany) Nürburgring (2007–present)
- (Germany) Motorsport Arena Oschersleben (2007–2022, 2024)
- (Germany) Lausitzring (2007–2017, 2020–2022, 2025–present)
- (Belgium) Circuit Zolder (2007, 2011)
- (Germany) Sachsenring (2007–2023, 2027)
- (Germany) Hockenheimring (2007, 2009–present)
- (Germany) Norisring (2008, 2023)
- (Netherlands) TT Circuit Assen (2008–2011)
- (Austria) Red Bull Ring (2011–present)
- (Netherlands) Circuit Zandvoort (2012, 2014–2019, 2021–2022, 2024–present)
- (Belgium) Circuit de Spa-Francorchamps (2013, 2015, 2024)
- Automotodróm Slovakia Ring (2013–2014)
- (Czech Republic) Autodrom Most (2018–2019)
- (Austria) Salzburgring (2025–2026)

== Champions ==
Season	Champion	Car	Team Champion	Secondary Class Champion	Ref
2007	(Germany) Christopher Haase	Lamborghini Gallardo GT3	(Germany) Reiter Engineering	P: (Germany) Jan Seyffarth; P: (Germany) Frank Schmickler; L: (Germany) Christopher Haase	
2008	(Germany) Tim Bergmeister	Porsche 997 GT3 Cup	(Germany) Team Flatex-Reiter (2)	P: (Germany) Tim Bergmeister; L: (Germany) Christopher Haase; L: (Germany) Albert von Thurn und Taxis; Pit: #30 (France) Hexis	
2009	(Germany) Christian Abt	Audi R8 LMS	(Germany) Callaway Competition	A: (Switzerland) Toni Seiler; Pit: #6 (Germany) Abt Sportsline	
2010	(Netherlands) Peter Kox (Germany) Albert von Thurn und Taxis	Lamborghini Gallardo LP560 GT3 (2)	(Germany) Abt Sportsline	A: (Switzerland) Toni Seiler (2); SRO: (Germany) Jürgen Bender; SRO: (Germany) Martin Dechent	
2011	(France) Dino Lunardi (Greece) Alexandros Margaritis	Alpina B6 GT3	(Germany) Reiter Engineering (3)	G: (Switzerland) Mark A. Hayek	
2012	(Germany) Sebastian Asch (Germany) Maximilian Götz	Mercedes-Benz SLS AMG GT3	(Germany) MS Racing Team	G: (Germany) Swen Dolenc	
2013	(Italy) Diego Alessi (Germany) Daniel Keilwitz	Corvette Z06.R GT3	(Germany) Prosperia C. Abt Racing (2)	G: (Denmark) Christina Nielsen	
2014	(Germany) René Rast (South Africa) Kelvin van der Linde	Audi R8 LMS ultra	(Germany) Prosperia C. Abt Racing (3)	G: (Austria) Handlos Herbert	
2015	(Germany) Sebastian Asch (2) (Germany) Luca Ludwig	Mercedes-Benz SLS AMG GT3 (2)	(Germany) BMW Sports Trophy Team Schubert	G: (Germany) Andreas Weishaupt	
2016	(United States) Connor De Phillippi (Germany) Christopher Mies	Audi R8 LMS	(Germany) Montaplast by Land-Motorsport	T: (Switzerland) Remo Lips; J: (United States) Connor De Phillippi	
2017	(France) Jules Gounon	Corvette C7 GT3-R (2)	(Germany) Callaway Competition (2)	T: (Switzerland) Remo Lips (2); J: (France) Jules Gounon	
2018	(France) Mathieu Jaminet (Germany) Robert Renauer	Porsche 911 GT3 R	(Germany) HTP-Winward Motorsport	T: (Switzerland) Remo Lips (3); J: (South Africa) Sheldon van der Linde	
2019	(Switzerland) Patric Niederhauser (South Africa) Kelvin van der Linde (2)	Audi R8 LMS Evo	(Germany) Rutronik Racing	T: (Germany) Sven Barth; J: (Austria) Max Hofer	
2020	(Germany) Michael Ammermüller (Germany) Christian Engelhart	Porsche 911 GT3 R (3)	(Germany) SSR Performance	T: (Germany) Elia Erhart; J: (Germany) Tim Zimmermann	
2021	(Switzerland) Ricardo Feller (Germany) Christopher Mies (2)	Audi R8 LMS Evo (5)	(Germany) Montaplast by Land-Motorsport (2)	T: (Germany) Florian Spengler; J: (Switzerland) Ricardo Feller	
2022	(Italy) Raffaele Marciello	Mercedes-AMG GT3 Evo (3)	(Germany) Mann-Filter Team Landgraf	T: (Germany) Florian Spengler (2); J: (United Kingdom) Ben Green	
2023	(Finland) Elias Seppänen (Germany) Salman Owega	Mercedes-AMG GT3 Evo (4)	(Germany) Haupt Racing Team	J: (Finland) Elias Seppänen (Germany) Salman Owega	
2024	(Germany) Tom Kalender (Finland) Elias Seppänen (2)	Mercedes-AMG GT3 Evo (5)	(Germany) Landgraf Motorsport (2)	S: (Germany) Tom Kalender (Finland) Elias Seppänen; PA: (Switzerland) Alexander Fach (Germany) Alexander Schwarzer; DTM: (Finland) Elias Seppänen	
2025	(Germany) Salman Owega (2) (Germany) Finn Wiebelhaus	Ford Mustang GT3	(Germany) Haupt Racing Team (2)	S: (Germany) Salman Owega (Germany) Finn Wiebelhaus; PA: (Switzerland) Alexander Fach (2) (Germany) Alexander Schwarzer (2); DTM: (Germany) Finn Wiebelhaus	
2026	(Switzerland) Felix Hirsiger (Germany) Finn Zulauf	Lamborghini Huracán GT3 Evo 2	(Germany) FK Performance Motorsport	S: (Switzerland) Felix Hirsiger (Germany) Finn Zulauf; PA: not held DTM: (Germany) Finn Zulauf	
