= Reiter Engineering =

German racing team and racing car manufacturer

- Industry: Automotive
- Founded: 2000; 26 years ago
- Founder: Hans Reiter
- Headquarters: Kirchanschöring, Bavaria, Germany
- Key people: Hans Reiter (Founder, owner)
- Subsidiaries: Sareni United
- Website: Official website

Reiter Engineering GmbH & Co Kg, commonly known simply as Reiter Engineering, is a German racing team and racing car manufacturer established in 2000 by motorsport engineer Hans Reiter.

Reiter was a partner of Lamborghini from 2000 to 2014, involved with the production of their GT race cars until the end of the Lamborghini Gallardo's racing tenure. The company first ventured into motorsport in the FIA GT Championship entering a Reiter-manufactured Diablo GTR for the 2000 season. Reiter continued their participation in the championship in 2003 with their purpose-built Murciélago R-GT jointly developed with Lamborghini and Audi Sport, and they would also later become the constructor of the Gallardo GT3 series of race cars for the FIA GT3 European Championship and later the ADAC GT Masters. Reiter's subsidiary Sareni United was also the constructor for the Camaro GT3. Currently, the company manufactures KTM's X-Bow GT4, GT4 EVO, GTX, and GT2 race cars. Reiter also builds and sells its cars to customer teams.

== Team history ==
=== In competition ===
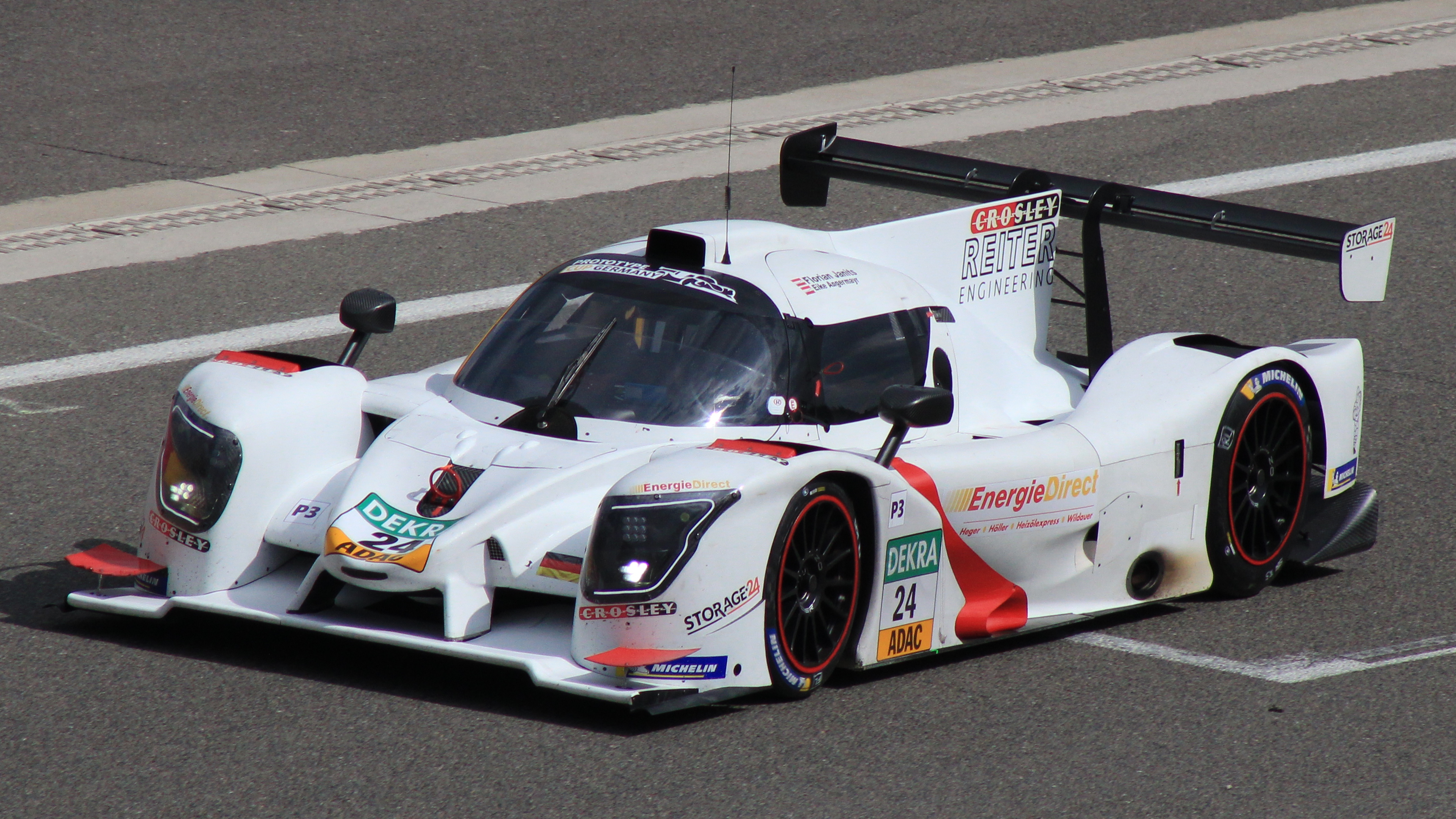
Reiter Engineering with the Ligier JS P320 at Spa-Francorchamps, participating in the 2022 Prototype Cup Germany.

Reiter Engineering first competed in sports car racing in 2000, entering a custom Lamborghini Diablo, modified from the spec used in the Lamborghini Supertrophy one-make series, to compete in the FIA GT Championship series. This car would be the first of many race cars across several years of competition built by Reiter Engineering.

The modified Diablo GTR that Reiter Engineering had developed would debut in the series in 2000. Their participation was short lived that year, however Reiter would score their first points with the Diablo the following year in 2001. This would be the only points scoring finish for the Diablo, as it would be replaced by Reiter's newer Murciélago R-GT based on the first generation Lamborghini Murciélago at the end of 2003.

This new car would earn points on its debut in 2004, with a third place at Valencia. The following year, Reiter managed another point at its home race in Oschersleben. Reiter managed to score sponsorship funding in 2006, leading to the team name being changed to B-Racing RS-Line Team early in the season and the ability to run two cars, before changing to become All-Inkl.com Racing halfway through the year. The team managed three points-scoring finishes, with a best result of sixth in Brno. 2007 saw Reiter's greatest success as the team opened the year with their first victory, drivers Christophe Bouchut and Stefan Mücke winning in Zhuhai. The two-car team managed to score points in six out of ten races that season, allowing the All-Inkl.com Racing squad to earn seventh in the Teams' Championship and Reiter Engineering tying for ninth.

In 2006, with the introduction of the new FIA GT3 European Championship and Reiter's new Lamborghini Gallardo-based Gallardo LP520 GT3, Reiter ran a three-car team in the series, alongside customer team S-Berg Racing. The team managed a best finish of third at Mugello, and going on to finish eighth in the Team's Championship. Their driver Albert von Thurn und Taxis won the Lamborghini Manufacturers' Cup as well. Following Reiter's success in FIA GT3, the team chose to move their Gallardos to the new ADAC GT Masters series in Germany for the inaugural 2007 season. Using the same formula as FIA GT3, Reiter was able to improve on their results from the previous year. The team managed nine victories in the twelve race season, handily winning the Teams' Championship and winning the Drivers' Championship for Christopher Haase in the No. 7 car. The No. 6 pairing of Thurn und Taxis and Peter Kox finished the season 2nd in the drivers' standings. For the following season in 2008, Haase and Thurn und Taxis finished 2nd in the drivers' standings. In 2011, team drivers Ferdinand Stuck and Johannes Stuck finished 2nd in the drivers' standings for the 2011 ADAC GT Masters, though Reiter Engineering became Team Champion that year.

Reiter Engineering undertook their first campaign in Le Mans Prototype racing in the LMP3 class, taking part in the 2022 Michelin Le Mans Cup with the Ligier JS P320, driven by factory drivers Freddie Hunt and Mads Siljehaug. This would be the first time the team would participate in a series in a car not originally built by them.

Reiter also took part in the 2022 Fanatec GT2 European Series with the KTM X-Bow GT2 Concept.

=== Relationship with Lamborghini and KTM ===
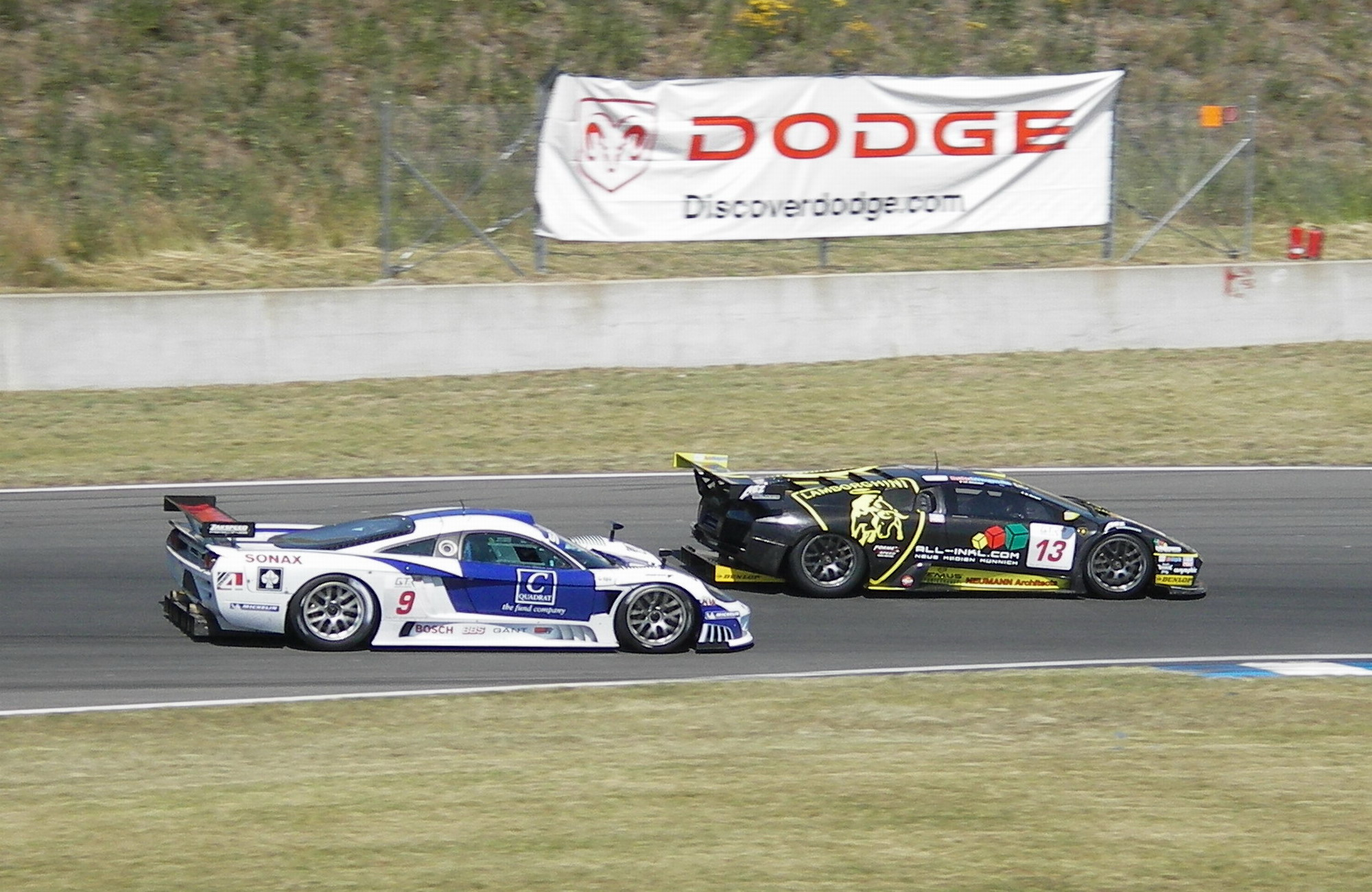
Reiter's Murciélago R-GT leading a Zakspeed Saleen S7-R at Oschersleben.

From 2000 to 2014, Reiter Engineering had developed a relationship with Lamborghini as their technical partner for their GT1, GT2, and GT3 series of race cars. The company's first venture into motorsport was in the 2000 FIA GT Championship entering a modified Diablo GTR from the Lamborghini Supertrophy one-make series to race in the GT1 class, with backing by Lamborghini.

The partnership would continue with the Lamborghini Murciélago, with the development of the Murciélago R-GT in 2003. The R-GT would be built with development aid from Lamborghini as well as Audi Sport. An evolution of the R-GT would be introduced in the 2010 24 Hours of Spa weekend with the Murciélago LP670 R-SV. The new car complied with the updated 2010 FIA GT1 World Championship rules and regulations.

Reiter and Lamborghini would enter the GT3 class in 2006, with Reiter's new Lamborghini Gallardo-based Gallardo LP520 GT3. From 2010 to 2014, Reiter Engineering developed three new Gallardos for the GT3 class in the form of the LP560 GT3 in 2011, LP600+ GT3 in 2012, and the GT3 FL2 in 2013. Reiter would enter the Blancpain GT Series with these cars alongside Grasser Racing Team and NSC Motorsports. Reiter also helped to develop Lamborghini's GT2 entry with the Gallardo LP560 GT2. The GT3 FL2 would be the last customer GT3 race car Lamborghini would use from Reiter Engineering, as they would move to the Lamborghini Huracán GT3 developed by Lamborghini Squadra Corse. Reiter would have one final run with the Gallardo with their upgraded Reiter Extenso R-EX. It would be the last motorsport incarnation of the Gallardo.

After Reiter Engineering's partnership with Lamborghini came to an end, they have helped manufacture GT4 and GT2 race cars for KTM since 2014, with the release of the X-Bow GT4 in 2015, and the X-Bow GTX and X-Bow GT2 in 2020. The new cars would be constructed in a collaborative effort between both companies, with additional design efforts from German design studio KISKA. The X-Bow GT4 made its debut in the 2015 GT4 European Series, and the X-Bow GT2 would debut in the 2022 Fanatec GT2 European Series.

=== Sareni United ===
Team owner Hans Reiter founded subsidiary Sareni United (stylized as SaReNi-United) in 2012. Sareni United was responsible for the company's GT3 race cars based on the fifth generation Chevrolet Camaro.

=== Reiter Young Stars ===
For 2016, Hans Reiter established the Reiter Young Stars programme, an initiative supporting rookie drivers and engineers in the GT4 European Series. Each rookie driver pairing drove a KTM X-Bow GT4 and, with aid from the primary Reiter Engineering team, was supported by two engineers, a marketing student and a business student from different universities across Europe, who would also be evaluated. Each team ran a number of programs in each race weekend they participated in, including setup with the Reiter engineers and courses with partners of the programme. The best male and female drivers of the programme were given a seat in the Blancpain GT Series Sprint Cup for the following year. Reiter Young Stars ran for two years in 2016 and 2017.

Caitlin Wood and Marko Helistekangas were the first Reiter Young Stars graduates in 2016, and as part of the prize, both drivers were entered into the 2017 Blancpain GT Series Sprint Cup with support from Reiter Engineering. They also entered the 2017 Blancpain GT Series Endurance Cup, racing alongside Tomáš Enge. Lennart Marioneck, Patric Niederhauser, and Mads Siljehaug were the final graduates of the programme, taking part in the 2018 Blancpain GT Series Endurance Cup with Reiter the following year.

== Automobiles produced ==
Reiter Engineering has been responsible for developing and helping create several GT racing cars, primarily for Lamborghini and KTM since the company's foundation in 2000. The company was a partner for Lamborghini for 14 years from 2000 to 2014, constructing race cars based on the Murciélago and the Gallardo. The company has also created a GT racing car based on the Chevrolet Camaro under their subsidiary Sareni United. In 2014, Reiter and KTM began collaborating together for the construction of their GT4-spec X-Bow for use in racing. Reiter Engineering have since helped manufacture their GT4 Evo, GTX, and GT2 Concept models.

=== Racing cars ===
==== Reiter-modified Diablo GTR (2000) ====
Reiter Engineering's Diablo GTR was an attempt to bring Lamborghini's motorsports presence to the international stage, by adapting the car to comply with FIA GT Championship regulations. Although other teams had previously attempted to adapt Diablo GTRs from the Lamborghini Supertrophy, Reiter's Diablo would be built just for FIA GT, allowing it to gain some performance advantages over its mass-produced siblings. The car retained several elements of the existing GTR, including the lack of a four-wheel drive system. The modified Diablo GTR debuted in the 2000 FIA GT Championship with backing from Lamborghini. It would race for three seasons until 2002, but would only score points once in 2001.

==== Lamborghini Murciélago R-GT (2003) ====
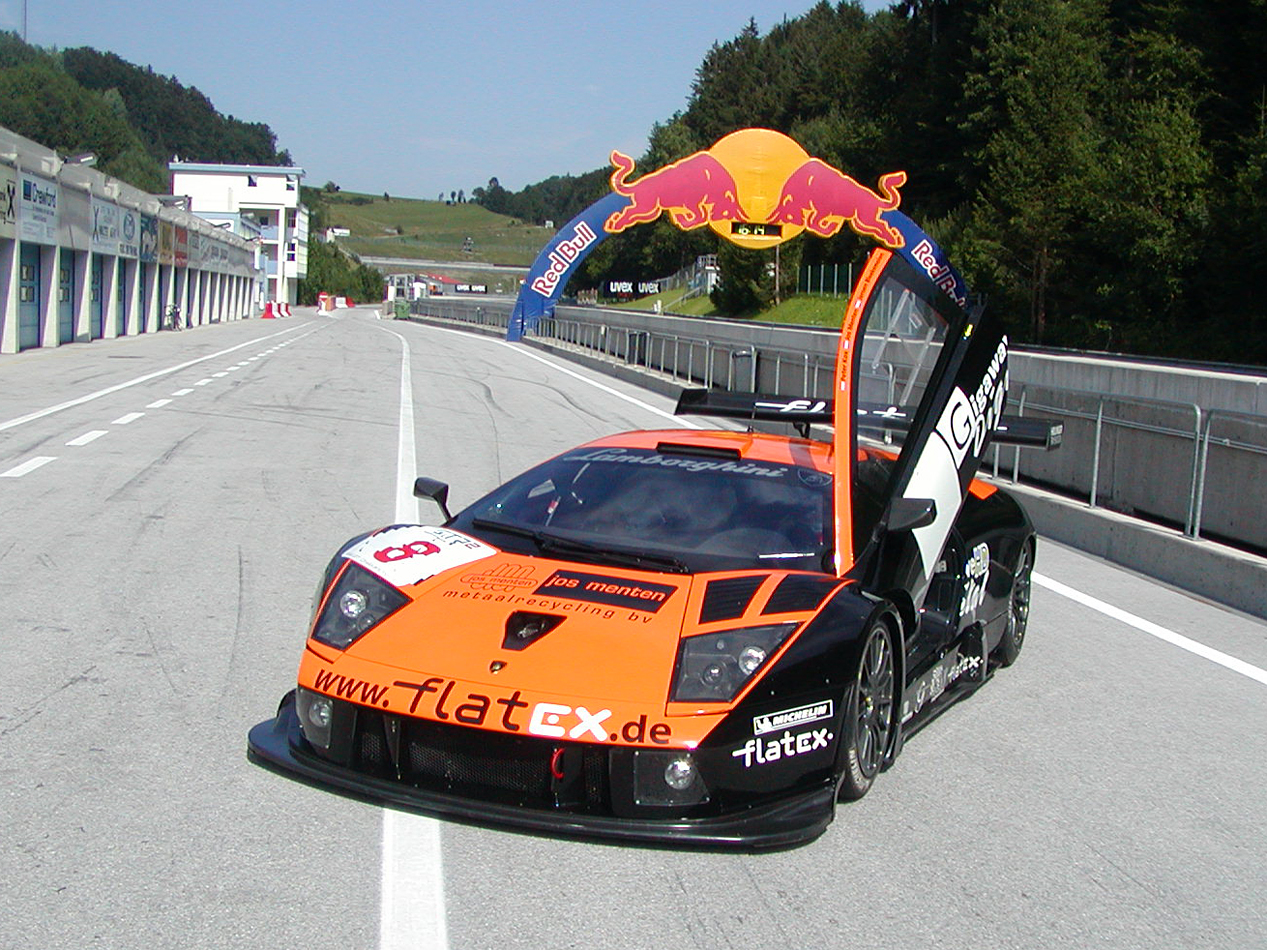
The Lamborghini Murciélago R-GT, Reiter Engineering's first Murciélago race car.

The Lamborghini Murciélago R-GT was the racing version of the Murciélago introduced in 2003, built with development aid from Lamborghini and Audi Sport. The R-GTs have been modified from their production versions, most notably by removing the four-wheel drive system to comply with FIA, ACO, and JAF regulations. The R-GT retains the standard V12, but has air restrictors to manage the power output. R-GTs were used by customer teams such as DAMS in the FIA GT Championship, and Krohn-Barbour Racing in the American Le Mans Series. Derivatives of the R-GT were built for the Japanese Lamborghini Owners Club to compete in the Super GT championship and 2006 24 Hours of Le Mans, called the RG-1 and the RG-1LM.

==== Lamborghini Gallardo LP520 GT3 (2006) ====
As the FIA GT3 European Championship became established as a series in 2006, Reiter developed the Lamborghini Gallardo LP520 GT3 based on the smaller Gallardo for use in the new series and to comply with Group GT3 regulations. A total of 49 Gallardo LP520 GT3s were built worldwide. In 2009, the Macau GT Cup was won by Keita Sawa in the Gallardo LP520 GT3.

==== Lamborghini Gallardo LP560 GT2 (2009) ====
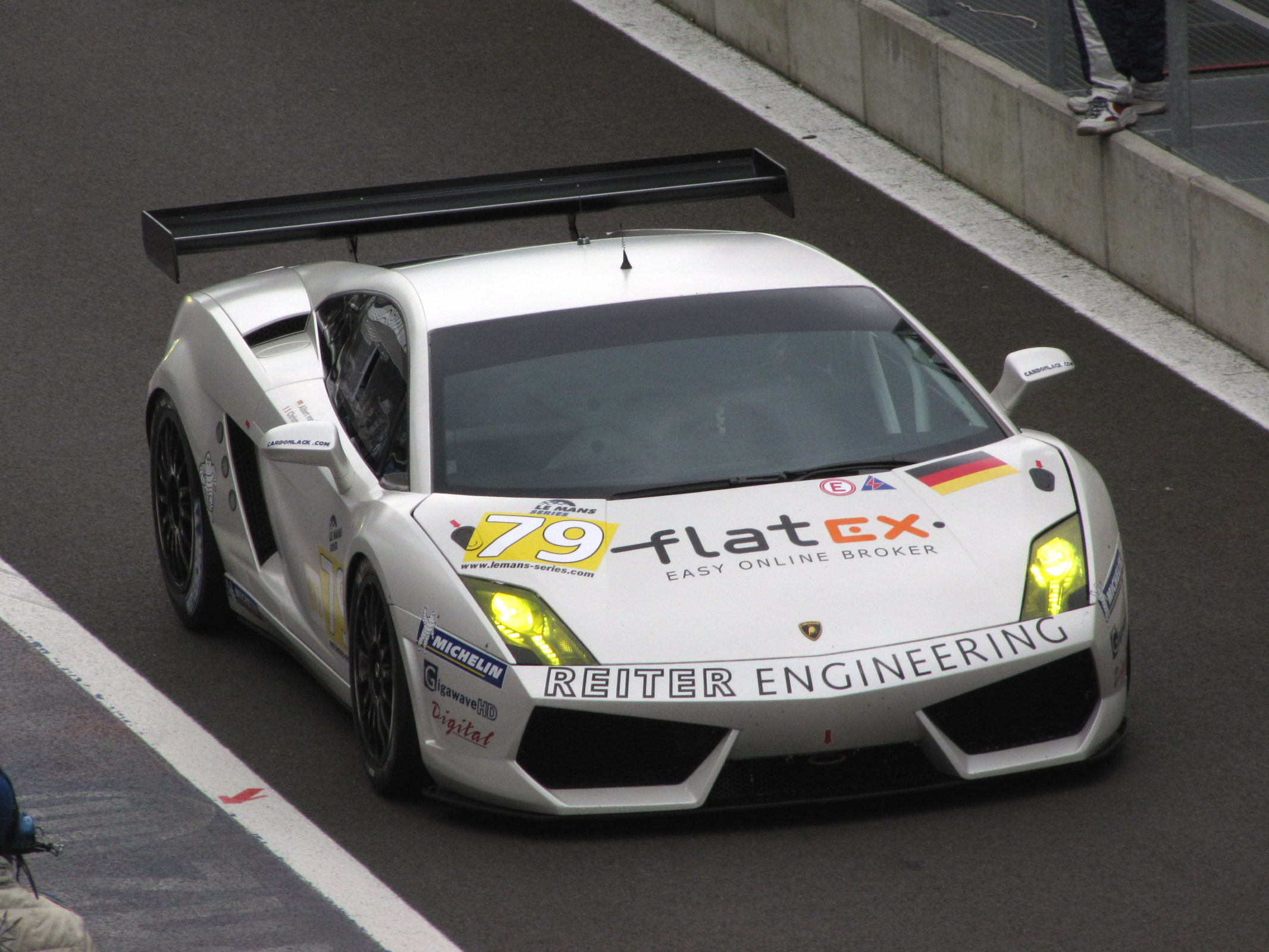
Reiter's Gallardo LP560 GT2 driven by Christophe Bouchut in Spa-Francorchamps.

For 2009, Reiter introduced the Lamborghini Gallardo LP560 GT2, based on the second generation Gallardo LP560-4, adapted to comply with ACO's GT2 class. The Gallardo LP560 GT2 underwent testing before racing the 2009 Le Mans Series season.

==== Lamborghini Gallardo LP560 GT3 (2009) ====
A new version of the GT3-spec Gallardo was released with the unveiling of the Gallardo LP560 GT3, based on the second generation Gallardo LP560-4, and is the result of engineering know-how from the Murciélago series of race cars as well as the previous Gallardo race cars. Like its predecessors, it was built to compete under Group GT3 regulations. The LP560 GT3 received a power increase, improved suspension geometry, updated aerodynamics, and a reduction in vehicle weight, resulting in a more efficient race car.

==== Lamborghini Murciélago LP670 R-SV (2010) ====
The Lamborghini Murciélago LP670 R-SV was an evolution of the R-GT based on the Murciélago LP670-4 SuperVeloce. It was introduced as an update to the previous car, and was built to comply with the updated 2010 FIA GT1 World Championship rules and regulations. The R-SV was unveiled in the 2010 24 Hours of Spa weekend.

==== Lamborghini Gallardo LP600+ GT3 (2012) ====
The Gallardo LP600+ GT3 is an evolution of the Gallardo LP560 GT3. It received a lighter Holinger transmission with faster response times, improved suspension, a larger front splitter and additional dive planes, and new braking and brake cooling systems with AP Racing brakes and six-piston calipers. The updated package was ready for customer teams in February 2012 at the Dubai 24 Hour.

==== Sareni Camaro GT3 (2012) ====
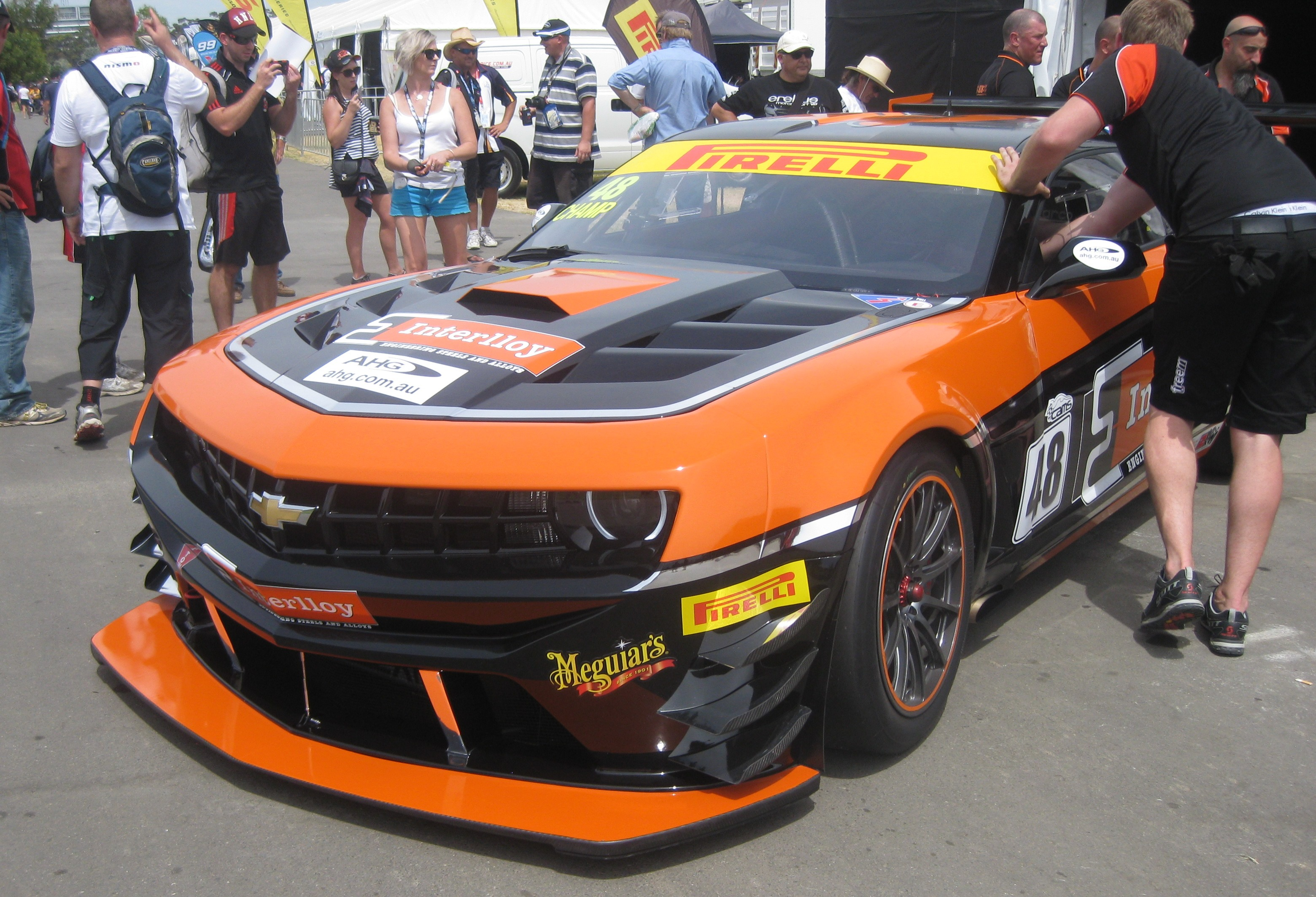
The Sareni Camaro GT3 at Adelaide Street Circuit for the 2015 Australian GT Championship.

In 2012, Reiter Engineering's subsidiary Sareni United were in charge of a GT3 specification race car project based on the fifth generation Chevrolet Camaro. The Sareni Camaro GT3 was unveiled later that year, as a cost-effective grand touring race car for customer teams to enter the racing world. The car is powered by a 7.9-litre Katech Engineering V8 delivering 650 hp (485 kW; 659 PS) and 627 lb⋅ft (850 N⋅m) unrestricted. It uses a 6-speed Holinger sequential transmission, racing suspension and a Teves Racing anti-lock braking system. The Camaro GT3 was released at €195,000, about two times cheaper than the average GT3 car.

In competition, despite being manufactured by Sareni, it would remain badged as a Chevrolet. The Camaro GT3 debuted in the 2012 ADAC GT Masters with YACO Racing and Mühlner Motorsport. Reiter ran a works entry in the series for three seasons in 2013 (as Sareni United), 2014, and 2015. It also participated in the Australian GT Championship with several customer teams from 2014 to 2016. One of those teams, Dale Paterson Motorsports, returned with the Camaro for 2018 and continued to use the chassis until the car was finally retired at the end of 2021. The Camaro was also entered into the NZ Endurance Championship and the North Island Endurance Series in a collaborative effort between Tulloch Motorsport and John McIntyre Racing.

==== Lamborghini Gallardo GT3 FL2 (2013) ====
The first Gallardo racer built in direct collaboration with Lamborghini, the Gallardo GT3 FL2 is a further update of the Gallardo LP600+ GT3. It has improved brakes for endurance racing, better engine cooling, and reduced fuel consumption. The car also includes improvements to the aerodynamics, with a more aggressive front splitter and rear diffuser. This would be the last Gallardo built in partnership with Lamborghini, as the Italian marque would move forward with the Lamborghini Huracán and use the race cars from their motorsport division Lamborghini Squadra Corse.

==== Reiter Engineering R-EX (2015) ====
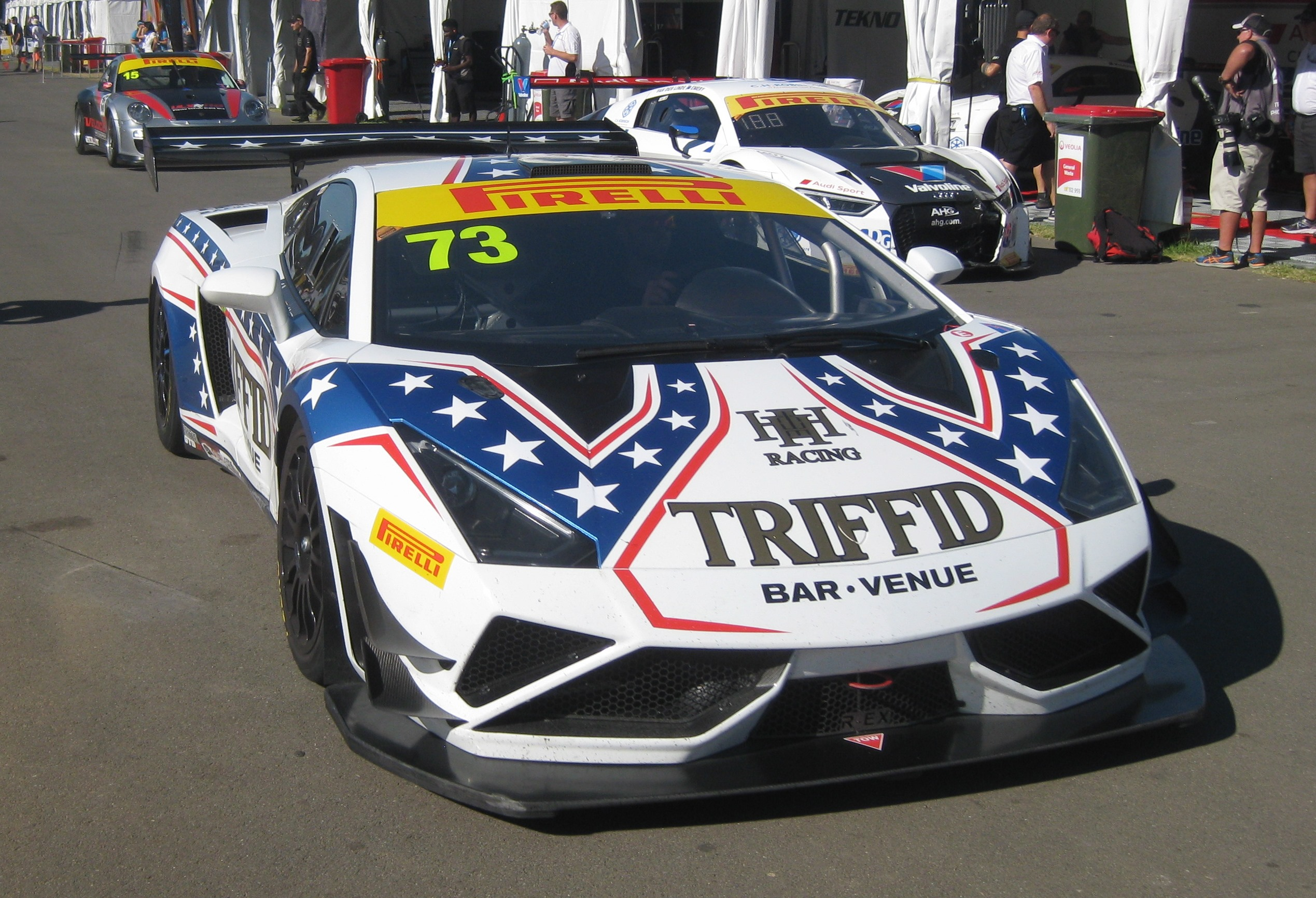
The Reiter Engineering R-EX at Adelaide Street Circuit for the 2017 Australian GT Championship.

Team owner Hans Reiter developed the Reiter Engineering R-EX with "emotion in mind", a quality he says was lost after the end of the FIA GT1 class of the 1990s.

An extensive update based on the Gallardo GT3 FL2, the R-EX, which stood for 'Reiter Extenso' referring to the car's wide range of extended updates, was introduced in 2015 and represented the culmination of the Gallardo in motorsport. It extended the life of the Gallardo in motorsport beyond the debut of Lamborghini's factory-built Huracán GT3. The R-EX maintains the 5.2-litre naturally-aspirated V10 engine from the previous Gallardos. It is 100% carbon fibre, and is wider by five inches than the Gallardo GT3 FL2 to improve rear-end grip. It also featured new front and rear lights, new camshafts for an improvement on low-end torque, Mahle pistons for better reliability and efficiency, and a retuned exhaust for a more aggressive sound. A total of 10 units were produced to compete in various GT3 racing series.

It debuted in the 2015 Blancpain GT Sprint Series and won the qualifying race of the fourth round with Reiter's works team at Moscow Raceway. Reiter returned to the series in 2017 with their Reiter Young Stars programme but with limited success, finishing below the top 20 in Misano and withdrawing a round later in Brands Hatch. Boutsen Ginion Racing entered as a customer team for the 2018 season at the first round in Circuit Zolder but only finished 19th in both Zolder races. The car also saw the track at the Australian GT Championship with several customer teams in the 2016 and 2017 seasons, finishing as high as 4th with Roger Lago and JBS Australia in 2016.

==== KTM X-Bow GT4 (2015) ====
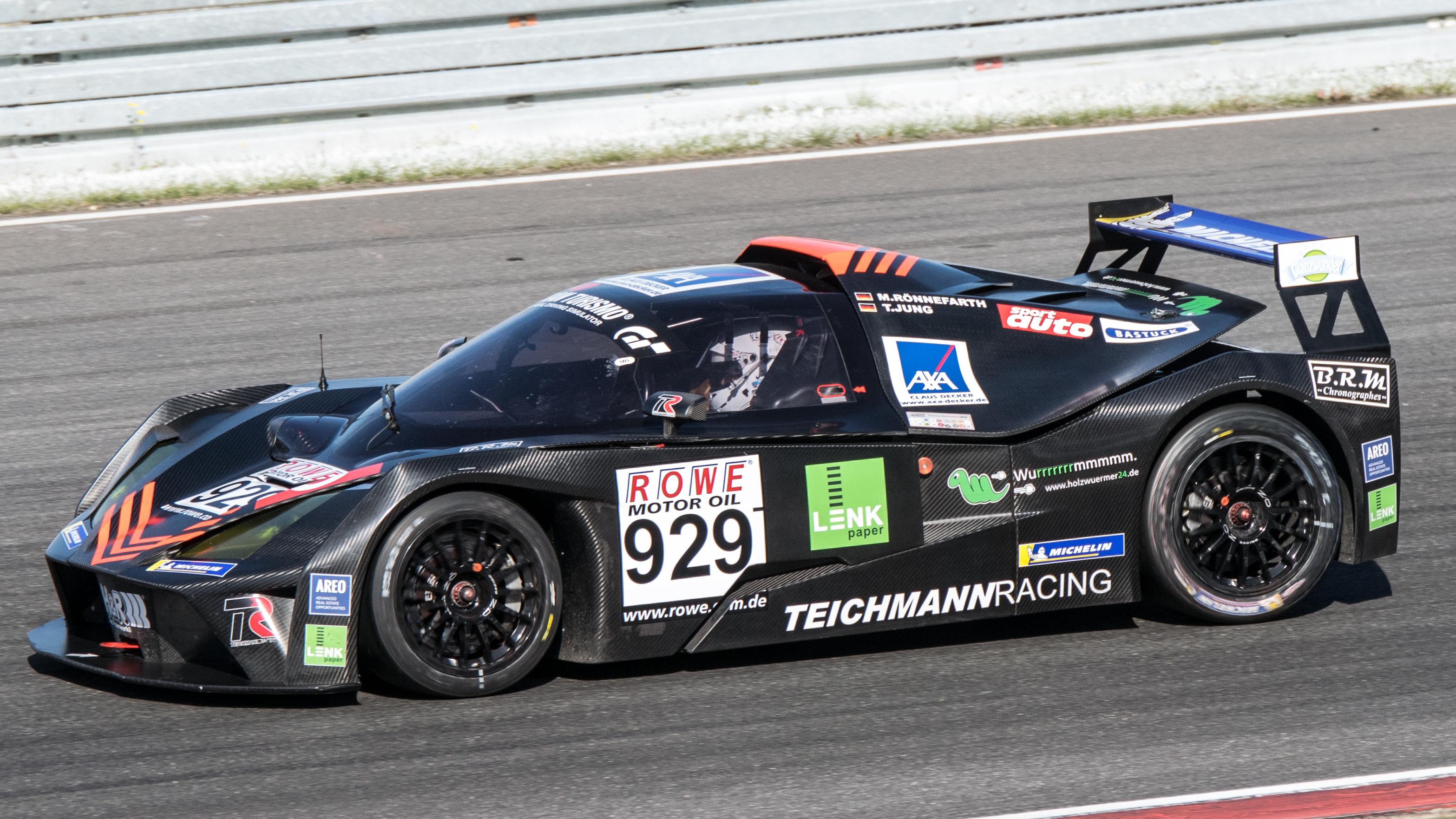
The X-Bow GT4 at the Nürburgring.

The KTM X-Bow GT4 was teased in 2014 by Reiter Engineering and later unveiled in 2015 as KTM's entry into the GT4 class. Initially called the X-Bow GTR, the car was built in collaboration with KTM and designed by KISKA, the studio that originally designed the X-Bow. To comply with GT4 regulations, the car features a closed cockpit design, the first in KTM's lineup to do so. The car retains the 2.0-litre turbocharged Audi I4 engine and the 6-speed Holinger sequential transmission from the road car, but are both modified for racing purposes. The carbon fibre and epoxy resin body has undergone a significant change and the car's wheelbase has been extended by 17 cm to accommodate the rules and regulations of GT4 racing. An upgrade was introduced to the X-Bow GT4 on 2018. The X-Bow GT4 debuted in the 2015 GT4 European Series and immediately took its first race win in its first race at the Circuit Zandvoort round.

==== KTM X-Bow GT4 Evo (2019) ====
An evolution of the X-Bow GT4 was unveiled in 2019 as the X-Bow GT4 Evo, as a result of research and development data derived from the X-Bow GTX during development of both cars. The update was focused on increasing the car's straight-line speed capabilities while maintaining the cornering performance of the previous X-Bow GT4. It also received a power increase of up to 440 hp (328 kW; 446 PS) unrestricted and 375 hp (280 kW; 380 PS) when subject to series balance of performance.

==== KTM X-Bow GTX / GT2 Concept (2020) ====
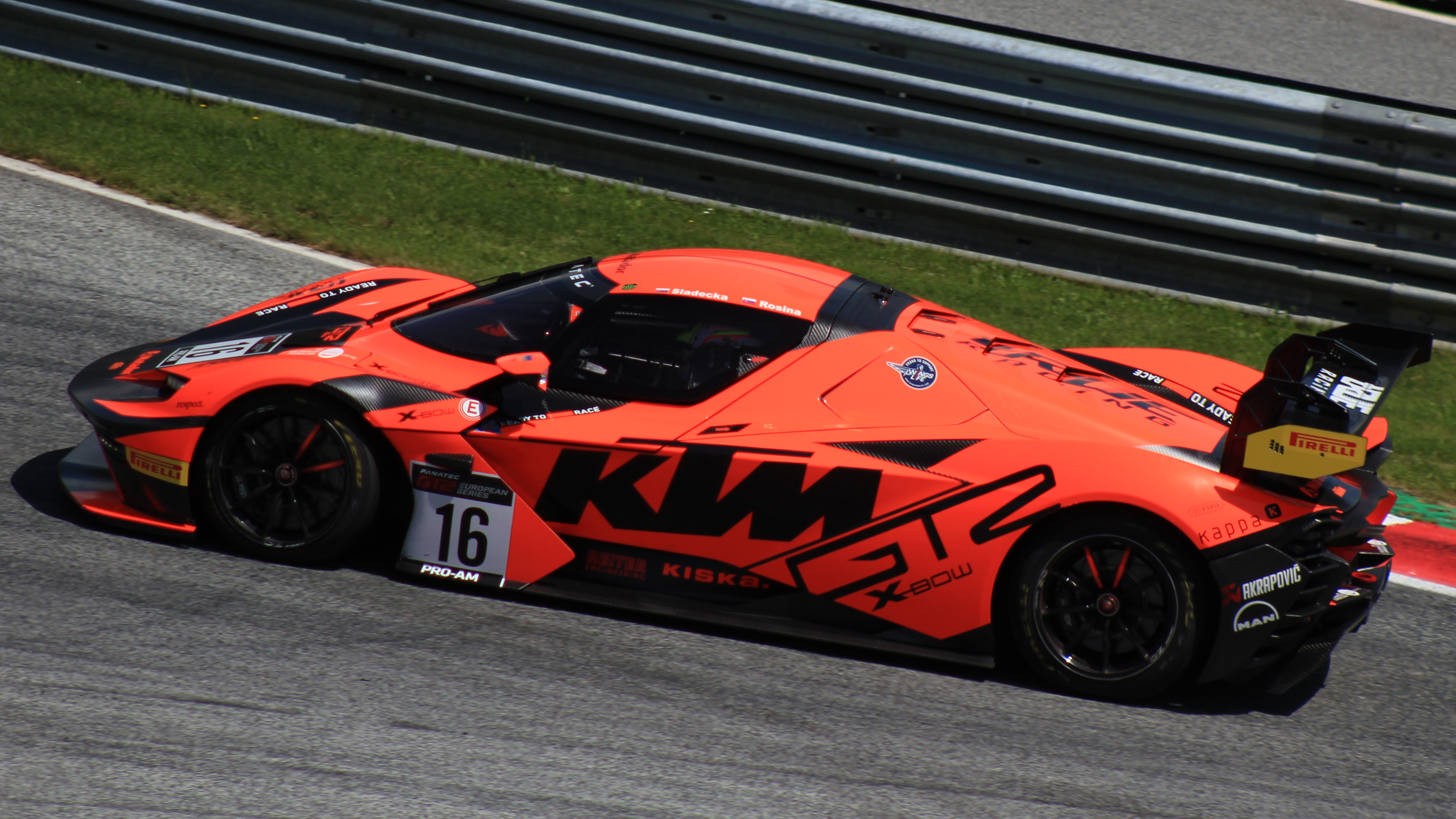
The X-Bow GT2 Concept at Red Bull Ring for the 2022 Fanatec GT2 European Series.

The X-Bow GTX is a longer wheelbase track-only race car built and based on the original X-Bow released in 2020. The car makes use of a 2.5-litre Audi TFSI 20-valve I5 engine. The 6-speed Holinger sequential transmission and its Formula 3 homologated carbon fibre monocoque are retained. The engine remains mostly standard, but receives upgraded injection valves, turbocharger waste gate, intake, exhaust, and engine management. The fuse box is engineered by Reiter's subsidiary Sareni United. The power steering is fully electric for the GTX.

A more powerful SRO GT2 specification race car of the GTX was released the same year, called the X-Bow GT2 Concept. It made its debut in the 2022 Fanatec GT2 European Series.

=== Road cars ===
==== Reiter Murciélago R-GT Streetversion (2008) ====
In 2008, Reiter Engineering introduced the Murciélago R-GT Streetversion, an aftermarket package for the Murciélago. The package featured extensive modifications to the car, including carbon fibre bodywork, aerodynamic upgrades, and black OZ alloy wheels. It also featured race-tuned suspension and a relocated exhaust, now positioned near the engine bay and below the rear wing. The car also featured a drivetrain conversion from all-wheel drive to rear-wheel drive in parallel with the R-GT race car. Reiter produced only one unit of the R-GT Streetversion, though the parts featured on it were mass-produced and sold separately as aftermarket parts for the Murciélago.

==== KTM X-Bow GT-XR (2022) ====
The X-Bow GT-XR is the street-legal version of the GTX and GT2 Concept race cars, unveiled in 2022. The car retains the 2.5-litre Audi TFSI 20-valve I5 engine from the original X-Bow sourced from the Audi RS3, and produces 493 hp (368 kW; 500 PS) and 429 lb⋅ft (582 N⋅m) of torque, with the power delivered to the rear wheels. It also uses a 7-speed DSG gearbox. The GT-XR also contains a 95-litre fuel tank for up to 620 miles (998 km) of range. The car has a dry weight of 1,250 kg (2,756 lb) with a front/rear weight distribution of 44:56. Its 0–60 mph (0–97 km/h) factory time is 3.4 seconds and has a top speed of 174 mph (280 km/h). The X-Bow GT-XR costs €284,900.

== Racing record ==
=== 24 Hours of Le Mans results ===
Year	Entrant	No.	Car	Drivers	Class	Laps	Pos.	Class Pos.
2008	(Russia) IPB Spartak Racing (Germany) Reiter Engineering	55	Lamborghini Murciélago R-GT	(Netherlands) Mike Hezemans (Netherlands) Peter Kox (Russia) Roman Rusinov	GT1	266	DNF	DNF
