= 1973 24 Hours of Le Mans =

41st 24 Hours of Le Mans endurance race

Previous: 1972	Next: 1974
Index: Races | Winners

The 1973 24 Hours of Le Mans was the 41st Grand Prix of Endurance and took place on 9 and 10 June 1973. It was the eighth round of the 1973 World Championship of Makes.

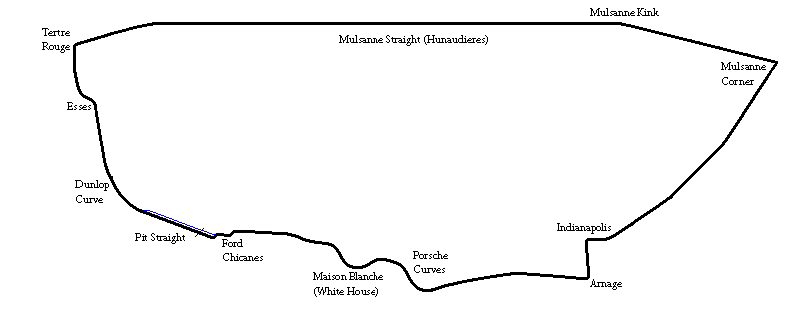
Le Mans in 1973

The race promised to be close, with Ferrari, Matra and Porsche all having two wins in the championship along with a surprise victory for Mirage at Spa. It did indeed turn out to be one of the most tense Le Mans, with the race won in the pits as both Ferrari and Matra took turns in the lead only to be stymied by mechanical failures. All three Ferraris had time in the lead, but as mechanical issues overtook them it was the Matra of Henri Pescarolo and Gérard Larrousse, despite its own challenges, that took the chequered flag. In the end it was a comfortable six-lap margin over the second-placed Ferrari of Merzario and Pace with the Matra of Jabouille/Jaussaud third.

There was a certain symmetry for a French car and a French team winning the fiftieth anniversary of the first 24 Hours of Le Mans. Ferrari did win the GT category after a close tussle with Porsche, and BMW had the only finisher in the Group 2 Touring Car category.

== Regulations ==
In the second year of the new regulations, there were no changes. This year the Automobile Club de l'Ouest (ACO) extended the eligible classes to eight with an extra one each in Group 5 and 2. Reserves were not kept, rather the ACO selected the 55 starters from those who arrived taking into account the results of the Four-Hour race at the Test Weekend.

The 1973 race marked the 50th anniversary of the inaugural race of Le Mans, celebrated with considerable pomp. Separate races were held for pre-war and post-war cars and a parade of the first historic Le Mans competitors was organized. The French Post Office issued a special commemorative stamp for the occasion.

== Entries ==
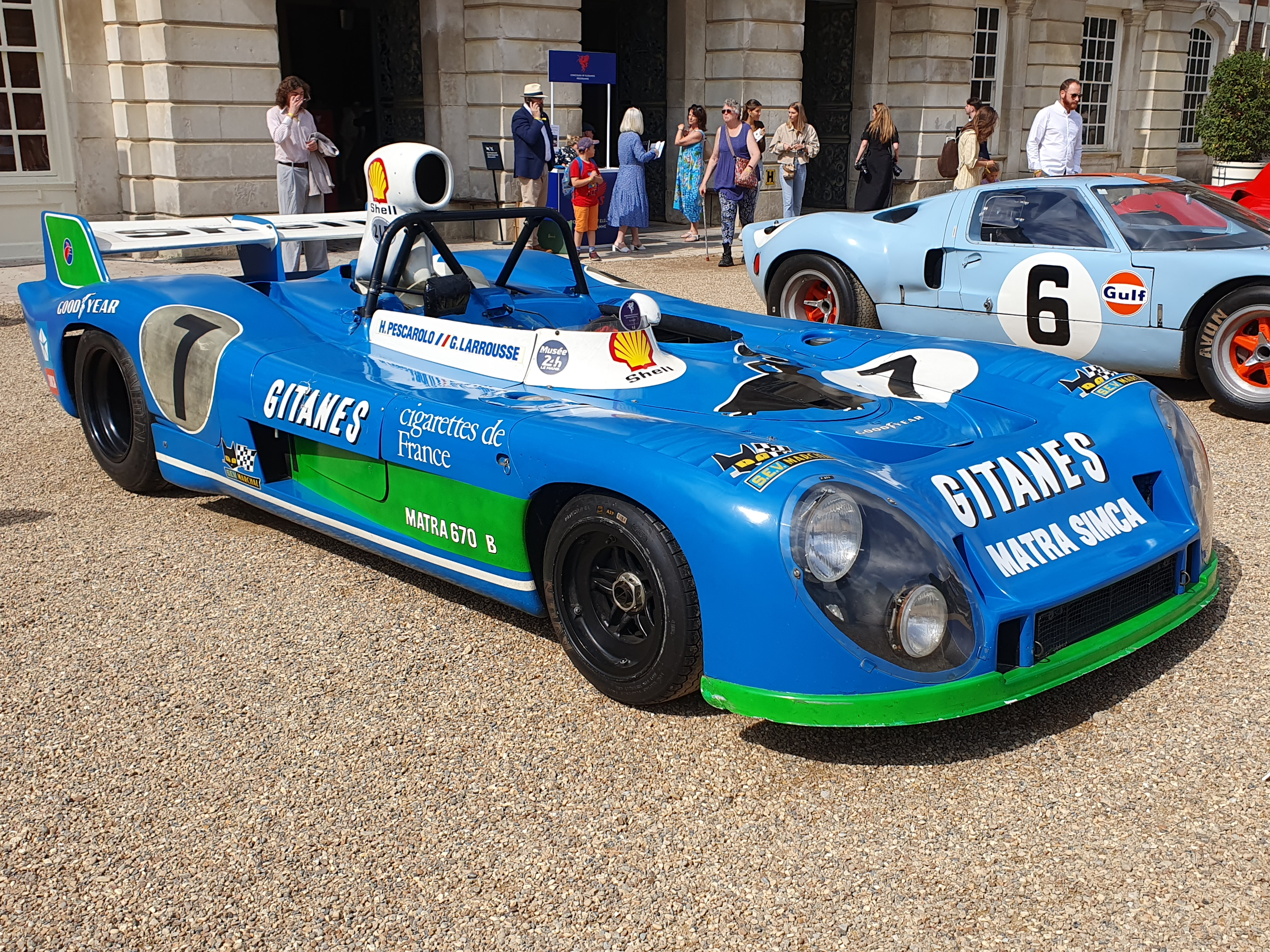
1973 Le Mans winning Matra-Simca 670B at Hampton Court in 2023

The ACO received 112 applications. Even though Autodelta, the Alfa Romeo works team withdrew just days before the event there were 61 cars present for practice on race-week. With Sports-prototypes from Matra, Ferrari, Mirage and Ligier as well as Ford and BMW in Group 2, there were 22 ‘works’ entries.

Category	Sports- Prototype Group 5	Special GT Group 4	Special Touring Group 2	Total Entries
Large-engines >2.5L classes	22	24	6	52
Medium-engines < 2.5L classes	9	0	0	9
Total Cars	31	24	6	61

After a distinct lack of success, Matra withdrew from Formula One to concentrate on contesting the World Championship of Makes against Ferrari. Its new longtail MS670B was made lighter, more aerodynamic and, importantly, equipped with Porsche "Type 1983" gearboxes. The V12 engine was tuned back to put out 450 bhp. and the car now ran on 13” tyres instead of the former 15”. Adding two cars to their regular Championship team made a strong 4-car challenge in an all-French driver line-up. Jean-Pierre Beltoise and François Cevert were constantly quickest but pushed their car hard, whereas Henri Pescarolo/Gérard Larrousse drove with endurance in mind, having got both of Matras victories to date. A third 670B was prepared for Jean-Pierre Jabouille/Jean-Pierre Jaussaud while Patrick Depailler/Bob Wollek had an older MS670.

After the 1972 sportscar season, Ferrari was having a tougher time running in two World Championships, entering only one car in F1 and skipping some GP altogether. Having come from the latest round with a 1–2 victory at the Nürburgring, and with the championship balanced, the works team had improved reliability. The latest iteration of the 312PB was wider and longer to take bigger tyres and improve handling. The aerodynamic longtail chassis increased speed on Le Mans’ big straights while the improved V12 was now capable of 460 bhp in race-trim. The regular team driver pairings of Jacky Ickx/Brian Redman (who had both Ferrari victories this year) and Arturo Merzario/Carlos Pace were augmented by Carlos Reutemann/Tim Schenken.

After 1971 John Wyer had retired from racing as the Porsche 917 sportscar class was discontinued. However, he resumed Mirage M3 plans for his own Cosworth-powered car-design and again convinced Gulf Oil to back the project. Former Ford engineer Len Bailey designed the Mirage M6 based around the Cosworth DFV engine, as he did in 1968 with the disappointing Ford P68. However, the DFV engine was renowned for vibration and being hard on components so a V12 engine, like in the Mirage M2 BRM, was commissioned from Weslake for a new coupé. But continual unreliability meant the Weslake project was shelved and the team focused on improving the V8 spyder refitted with ZF gearboxes, buoyed by a 1-2 result at Spa. Their drivers were Derek Bell/Howden Ganley and Mike Hailwood/John Watson (nursing a broken leg)/Vern Schuppan.

Alfa Romeo was more affected than Ferrari by the Years of Lead strikes and social troubles in Italy. Autodelta, the Alfa works team, felt their new 500 bhp flat-12 powered car was still unprepared for 24 hours and did not enter. But they were represented by their customer team, Scuderia Brescia Corse, with a V8 T33/3.

Lola did return to Le Mans after a promising, but tragic, race the previous year. The Scuderia Filipinetti had taken over Jo Bonnier’s team after his death. Despite the Swiss team’s owner Georges Filipinetti dying in May from a heart attack, a car was entered for Jean-Louis Lafosse and Hughes de Fierlandt. An ex-Bonnier Lola was also run by former hill-climb champion Daniel Rouveyran. Alain de Cadenet also returned to Le Mans after a strong run the previous year in his Duckhams-Cosworth, paired again with Chris Craft. The body was redesigned to be more aerodynamic although no high-speed testing had been able to be done. Ligier finally had the improved Citroen-Maserati V6 engine, now capable of 330 bhp and three cars were entered for the race, including one for Guy Ligier himself, with Jacques Laffite.

The 2-litre Group 5 class was well represented this year. The Chevron chassis was designed to accommodate a variety of engines and five were entered. Cosworth recommended an engine rebuild of their 2-litre FVC engine after only four hours of racing, so running 24 hours was problematic. They were up against a French ACE, a Lola and an old Porsche 910. Perhaps the most interesting entry was the first Japanese car to race at Le Mans, and with the first Japanese drivers. Shin Kato’s Sigma Automotive was entered to the race with the MC73, powered by a Mazda Wankel twin-rotary engine. With a claimed performance of 260 bhp it was calculated as a 2292cc equivalent. Three were built for the Japanese series and one came to Le Mans.

Once again it was Ferrari versus Chevrolet in the GTS Group 4. The 365 GTB/4 “Daytona” now developed 440 bhp and nine were entered by the customer teams, many with works-prepared engines. Vic Elford was coaxed out of semi-retirement by the French Charles Pozzi team and there were four from the North American Racing Team (NART) including their young drivers’ Trofeo car (managed by Phil Hill). Four Corvettes were entered: the two French cars of Henri Greder and the Ecurie Léopard. John Greenwood arrived with two cars, one carrying a special alloy 7-litre engine boosted to put out 700 bhp.

Porsche could have entered any of its old underpowered low drag Porsche 908 versions again, but these had to carry ballast now as minimum weight had been increased for 1972, thus only privateers raced 908s after 1971, with Joest finishing 3rd in 1972. Filling out the Group 5 field were four older Porsche 908s, including the regular entries from the Spanish Escuderia Montjuïch and Swiss André Wicky. Instead, in preparation of what should become the Porsche 935 for new rules in 1975 which were postponed to 1976, they updated the ten year old Porsche 911 design, which in 1972 was refined to the lightweight Carrera RS 2.7 "duck tail", and now had two RSR versions: homologated as GT, and somewhat unlimited, entered as 3-litre sportscar. Thus they came to Le Mans with bigger, burlier versions of the 911 to take on the big cars in Group 4 while developing a future car. Before homologation was granted the RSR versions scored three surprise wins, at 1973 24 Hours of Daytona, at Sebring beating the Group 5, and in what was to be the final World Championship Targa Florio. The Carrera RS was lightened, with a big rear spoiler and flared wheel-arches to take wider 11” tyres. The engine had been bored out to 2.7-litres, and now produced 240 bhp. The RSR-variant had a bigger 2.8-litre engine good for 300 bhp. As in 1971, Porsche factory entered as a Martini International sponsored team, now led by David Yorke (former team manager at Gulf-Wyer) and with two experimental versions capable of 320 bhp in the Sports category. Further lightened, they had 14” tyres and were driven by Gijs van Lennep/Herbert Müller and Reinhold Joest/Claude Haldi. Additionally, a squadron of eleven standard GT-class 911s arrived for practice from privateer teams.

In Group 2, the European Touring Car Championship (ETCC) was again very popular with top drivers and close racing, and the mighty battle between the works teams of BMW and Ford spilled over into Le Mans. Ford Germany arrived with three 3-litre V6 Ford Capri for drivers Dieter Glemser/John Fitzpatrick, Gerry Birrell/Hans Heyer and Helmut Koinigg/Jean Vinatier. In response, BMW turned up with the 3.0 CSL run by its newly set up BMW Motorsport works team under Jochen Neerpasch (formerly at Ford). The car had a more powerful inline-6 M49 with 360 bhp over the Capri's 300 bhp. Their drivers were Chris Amon/Hans-Joachim Stuck and Toine Hezemans/Dieter Quester with a third for the Wicky Racing Team.

== Practice ==
At the March test weekend, Beltoise put in a time for the Matra four seconds faster than Ferrari had 12 months earlier. Ferrari, citing labour strikes in Italy, did not attend. But Merzario and Ickx immediately set the pace on Wednesday night when official practice started. The only other sub-3:40 time was from the Cevert/Beltoise Matra; in fact these two works teams filled the top seven spots on the grid. Next were the two Gulf Mirages and the Gitanes Lola in tenth. None of the teams had been trying too hard to compete for a top time. The smaller teams had a far tougher time. Both the Duckhams and the Ligiers were suffering from unstable aerodynamics. The Duckhams was running over ten seconds slower than it had the previous year. In the small-engine class, the Spanish Chevron was 13th (4:11.0) just ahead of the Sigma rotary (4:11.1). The Porsche RSR prototypes were slower than their test weekend times, until van Lennep found performance improved with narrower rear tyres. Müller recorded a 4:14.9 to be 18th on the grid. Several incidents gave the mechanics all-nighter repair jobs: John Watson's Mirage spun in the Porsche curves and the rear section lifted and clouted him on the head; Lola had a tyre blowout rip up the rear bodywork and Ferrari got an urgent call from the factory saying the valve springs were set wrong needing 48 changes per engine.

It was close in the Group 2 and 4 categories with only three seconds covering the best Ferraris, Porsches, Fords and BMWs. Quickest was Glemser in the Ford Capri (4:16.0 for 22nd) ahead of Elford's Ferrari. The Corvettes were off the pace with Greenwood's being the best with a 4:19.6. His special-engine car was disqualified by the officials after Don Yenko had had an accident doing illegal road-testing on public roads after a full differential change. His daughter, also in the car, was taken to the hospital for stitches. The Kremer-Porsche caught fire when oil leaked onto the hot exhaust, necessitating a full engine-change, and Walter Brun put the Wicky-BMW into the Armco at the chicane.

== Race ==
=== Start ===
Bright sunshine in race week became dark clouds on Saturday morning, however by 4pm it was sunny again. Honorary starter this year was Sylvain Floirat, President of Matra. From the first lap, Merzario was bolting ahead, sent out as the ‘hare’ to lead the Matras into a race – a role he relished. However, none of the other teams took the bait. A number of cars were coming in immediately with problems: Reinhold Joest's Martini Porsche with gearbox problems and the Grossman Ferrari with a puncture. Hailwood's Mirage had no clutch and Amon's BMW only had fifth gear. The Gitanes Lola, the Duckhams and the Sigma also all had early issues.

By the pit stops around the end of the first hour, Merzario had built a significant lead but already needed to change brakepads. After the first driver changes, Carlos Pace only got six laps in the Ferrari until he had to stop, partly soaked in petrol from a split fuel tank, losing six laps. Matra was now 1-2-3 with Cevert leading from Larrousse and Wollek, chased by Reutemann in the Ferrari. While the Matras were all running at the same speed, the Ferraris had a variety of strategies. Carlos Reutemann and Tim Schenken were running among the Matras. Jacky Ickx and Brian Redman were running with the slowest 3-litre cars, the Lolas and the Alfa Romeo.

After four hours, Jaussaud's front tyre blew out while going down the Mulsanne Straight. Ten laps were lost repairing the suspension. Less than an hour later, Beltoise had almost the same thing happen, and his Matra lost eight laps. As the Pescarolo/Larrousse car had been delayed fixing its brakes the lead fell to the Wollek/Depailler Matra. Then at 9.30pm, their car was in the pits with a terminal oil-pump problem and suddenly the Matra challenge was looking very shaky. At the same time, the GT-leading Sam Posey’s NART Ferrari lost five minutes in a poor pitstop, allowing the Charles Pozzi car of Elford/Ballot-Léna to take the category lead. These cars were all having a close running battle with the Martini Porsche, the Spanish 908, the Maublanc Chevron 2-litre and the fastest Capri.

=== Night ===
So by 10pm after six hours, it was now the Schenken/Reutemann Ferrari leading from Pescarolo/Larrousse. Third was Ickx/Redman, hitherto run conservatively, ahead of the Hailwood/Watson/Schuppan Mirage, Merzario's Ferrari and the Brescia Alfa Romeo. Wollek's Matra was 7th and the Müller/van Lennep Porsche 8th. Then when Pescarolo was delayed again, this time by a faulty gear selector, Ferrari was running 1–2. Both Merzario and Cevert were pushing their cars hard to make up lost time and just before midnight, Cevert put in the fastest lap of the race.

Soon after midnight, Schuppan went wide at Tertre Rouge, hit the barrier and rolled his Mirage. The Merzario/Pace Ferrari was back in the pits, this time for 40 minutes replacing a slipping clutch. The Elford/Ballot-Léna spent 11 minutes changing brakepads, allowing the NART Ferrari through to the GT-lead again. In Group 2, all three Fords had been badly as night fell. The Birrell/Heyer car was out early, and its drivers transferred to the other team cars. The Glemser/Fitzpatrick car had got as high as tenth with the Hezemans/Quester BMW close by in 12th. Both cars were delayed before midnight and spent the rest of the night working back through the field.

Then at 2.30am the leader was stopped out on the track by a broken conrod, and soon after Beltoise's Matra (now running 5th) again had a tyre blow out on it but this time it threw him into the guard-rails. So at half-time, Ickx was leading Pescarolo by two laps, while 8 laps further back Facetti in the surprising Alfa Romeo was ahead of Merzario and the Martini Porsche. After all the mechanical problems with the Group 5 cars, the NART Ferrari 365 was sixth leading the GTs, hounded by the Kremer and Sonauto Porsches and Elford's Ferrari. Ecuadorian Guillermo Ortega's privateer Porsche 908 rounded out the top-10.

=== Morning ===
Dawn came with mist and a light drizzle, but cleared to be another sunny day. But then after leading for seven hours, the lead Ferrari started sounding rough and just after 9am Redman brought it in with a split exhaust header. Coincidentally, a lap later Pescarolo also came in, with brake problems. It was the Matra that got back out into the lead just 15 seconds before the Ferrari. Mid-morning the third-placed Alfa Romeo's gearbox's broke. Seventy minutes were spent repairing it.

In the GT race, the NART Ferrari was running sixth and still held a narrow lead over the Kremer Porsche, made easier when the Porsche lost time in the early morning with a jammed brake calliper and detached exhaust. The Gregg/Chasseuil Sonauto Porsche was in 8th overall at 6am when a puncture on the Mulsanne Straight damaged the suspension dropping down the order. They were not alone, as most of the GT field had serious problems in the morning. In Group 2, it was resolved when the remaining Ford of Glemser/Fitzpatrick/Heyer got a broken conrod at 10.40am, leaving the BMW as the last Group 2 car running.

Then at 11am Minter bought the GT-leading Ferrari from 7th, smoking badly from a cracked piston. At the same time Ickx brought the pursuing Ferrari in with a split fuel cell like its sister-car had had earlier, costing 25 minutes and six laps to repair. But an hour later the Matra's starter motor failed in a regular pit-stop costing 20 minutes, and it was even once again.

=== Finish and post-race ===
Finally, with barely 90 minutes to go, the Ickx/Redman Ferrari was out – another conrod had broken and the car was wheeled away to a standing ovation from the crowd in the grandstand opposite. After that Pescarolo and Larrousse were able to ease off and cruise to the finish. In the end they finished six laps ahead of the Merzario/Pace Ferrari. Eighteen laps further back (and still not overtaken Ickx's retired Ferrari on distance) was the recovering Matra of Jabouille/Jaussaud.

In a very close finish, the French Ferrari of Elford/Ballot-Léna was sixth, barely a lap ahead of the hard-charging Kremer Porsche, with Ortega's privateer Porsche 908 between them. Ninth was the other Pozzi Ferrari of Serpaggi/Dolhem with Georg Loos’ Porsche RSR in tenth. The Brescia Corse Alfa Romeo had had a troubled end to the race with gearbox, clutch then fuel-pump issues after a solid first half but eventually got home in 15th.

After the win at Le Mans, Matra stormed home in the Championship winning the next two rounds. The final round in Argentina was cancelled due to lack of support, giving Matra the championship with five victories (all to Pescarolo/Larrousse) to Ferrari's two. In the European GT season it was Claude Ballot-Léna and Clemens Schickentanz, both driving Porsche RSRs who shared the championship on equal points. Toine Hezemans won the European Touring Car Championship for BMW. Later in the summer, “Pesca” and Larrousse came back to Le Mans to be presented with the Legion d’Honneur, France's highest order of merit. Still to date, 1973 was the final time that the Alfa Romeo works team raced at Le Mans. Scuderia Ferrari's factory team would be absent from prototype racing at Le Mans for 50 years until their return and win in 2023.

== Official results ==
=== Finishers ===
Results taken from Quentin Spurring's book, officially licensed by the ACO Class Winners are in Bold text.

Pos	Class	No.	Team	Drivers	Chassis	Engine	Tyre	Laps
1	**S** **3.0**	**11**	**(France) Equipe Matra-Simca Shell**	**(France) Henri Pescarolo** **(France) Gérard Larrousse**	Matra-Simca MS670B	Matra 3.0L V12	G	355
2	S 3.0	16	(Italy) SpA Ferrari SEFAC	(Italy) Arturo Merzario (Brazil) Carlos Pace	Ferrari 312PB-73	Ferrari 3.0L F12	G	349
3	S 3.0	12	(France) Equipe Matra-Simca Shell	(France) Jean-Pierre Jabouille (France) Jean-Pierre Jaussaud	Matra-Simca MS670B	Matra 3.0L V12	G	331
4	S 3.0	46	(Germany) Martini Racing Team	(Switzerland) Herbert Müller (Netherlands) Gijs van Lennep	Porsche 911 Carrera RSR	Porsche 2.8L F6	D	328
5	S 3.0	3	(Spain) Escuderia Montjuïch (Switzerland) Haberthur Racing	(Spain) Juan Fernandez (Spain) Francisco Torredemer (Switzerland) Bernard Chenevière	Porsche 908/03	Porsche 3.0L F8	G	319
6	**GTS**; **5.0**	**39**	**(France) Automobiles Charles Pozzi**	**(United Kingdom) Vic Elford** **(France) Claude Ballot-Léna**	Ferrari 365 GTB/4	Ferrari 4.4L V12	MI	316
7	S 3.0	4	(Ecuador) G. Ortega (private entrant)	(Ecuador) Guillermo Ortega (Ecuador) Fausto Morello	Porsche 908/02K	Porsche 3.0L F8	G	316
8	**GTS**; **3.0**	**45**	**(Germany) Kremer Racing Team**	**(Germany) Erwin Kremer** **(Switzerland) Paul Keller** **(Germany) Clemens Schickentanz**	Porsche 911 Carrera RSR	Porsche 2.8L F6	D	316
9	GTS; 5.0	40	(France) Automobiles Charles Pozzi	(France) Alain Serpaggi (France) José Dolhem	Ferrari 365 GTB/4	Ferrari 4.4L V12	MI	315
10	GTS; 3.0	63	(Germany) Gelo Racing Team	(Germany) Georg Loos (Germany) Jürgen Barth	Porsche 911 Carrera RSR	Porsche 2.8L F6	D	311
11	**TS**; **5.0**	**51**	**(Germany) BMW Motorsport**	**(Netherlands) Toine Hezemans** **(Austria) Dieter Quester**	BMW 3.0 CSL	BMW 3.3L S6	D	307
12	**GTS** **+5.0**	**30**	**(France) Greder Racing Team**	**(France) Henri Greder** **(France) Marie-Claude Beaumont**	Chevrolet Corvette C3	Chevrolet 7.0L V8	MI	303
13	GTS; 5.0	38	(United States) North American Racing Team	(France) François Migault (United States) Luigi Chinetti Jr	Ferrari 365 GTB/4	Ferrari 4.4L V12	G	299
14	GTS; 3.0	48	(France) Sonauto BP Racing	(United States) Peter Gregg (France) Guy Chasseuil	Porsche 911 Carrera RSR	Porsche 2.8L F6	G	298
15	S 3.0	60 (reserve)	(Italy) Scuderia Brescia Corse	(Italy) Carlo Facetti (Italy) “Pam” (Marsillio Pasotti) (Italy) Teodoro Zeccoli	Alfa Romeo Tipo 33TT3	Alfa Romeo 3.0L V8	G	298
16	GTS; 3.0	41	(Switzerland) Schiller Racing Team (private entrant)	(Switzerland) Jean Selz (Switzerland) Florian Vetsch	Porsche 911 Carrera RS	Porsche 2.7L F6	F	298
17	GTS; 3.0	42	(France) R. Mazzia (private entrant)	(France) Pierre Mauroy (France) Marcel Mignot	Porsche 911 Carrera RS	Porsche 2.8L F6	D	290
18	GTS +5.0	69 (reserve)	(France) Écurie Léopard	(France) Jean-Claude Aubriet (France) "Dépnic" (Jean-Claude Depince)	Chevrolet Corvette C3	Chevrolet 7.0L V8	MI	282
19	S 3.0	18	(France) C. Laurent (private entrant)	(France) Claude Laurent (France) Martial Delalande (France) Jacques Marché	Ligier JS2	Maserati 3.0L V6	MI	270
20	GTS; 5.0	34	(Belgium) Ecurie Francorchamps	(France) Jean-Claude Andruet (United Kingdom) Richard Bond	Ferrari 365 GTB/4	Ferrari 4.4L V12	G	270
21	S 3.0	52	(Switzerland) Wicky Racing Team	(Switzerland) André Wicky (Morocco) Max Cohen-Olivar (Switzerland) Philippe Carron	Porsche 908/02K	Porsche 3.0L F8	F	270

=== Did Not Finish ===
Pos	Class	No	Team	Drivers	Chassis	Engine	Tyre	Laps	Reason
DNF	S 3.0	15	(Italy) SpA Ferrari SEFAC	(Belgium) Jacky Ickx (United Kingdom) Brian Redman	Ferrari 312PB-73	Ferrari 3.0L F12	G	332	Engine (24hr)
DNF	GTS; 5.0	6	(United States) North American Racing Team	(United States) Sam Posey (United States) Milt Minter	Ferrari 365 GTB/4	Ferrari 4.4L V12	G	254	Engine (21hr)
DNF	TS; 3.0	55	(Germany) Ford Motorenwerke; Deutschland	(Germany) Dieter Glemser (United Kingdom) John Fitzpatrick (Germany) Hans Heyer	Ford Capri LV	Ford 3.0L V6	D	239	Engine (20hr)
DNF	S 2.0	25	(Switzerland) M. Dupont (private entrant)	(Switzerland) Michel Dupont (Switzerland) Paul Blancpain	Chevron B23	Cosworth FVC 1980cc S4	F	229	Gearbox (22hr)
DNF	GTS; 5.0	33	(United Kingdom) J.C. Bamford Excavators (private entrant)	(United Kingdom) Neil Corner (United Kingdom) Willie Green	Ferrari 365 GTB/4	Ferrari 4.4L V12	MI	214	Gearbox (18hr)
DNF	GTS; 5.0	37	(United States) North American Racing Team	(Argentina) Rubén Luis di Palma (Argentina) Nestor García-Veiga	Ferrari 365 GTB/4	Ferrari 4.4L V12	G	211	Transmission (18hr)
DNF	GTS; 5.0	36	(United States) North American Racing Team	(United States) Bob Grossman (France) Lucien Guitteny	Ferrari 365 GTB/4	Ferrari 4.4L V12	G	192	Accident (19hr)
DNF	S 3.0	19	(France) Automobiles Ligier	(France) Alain Couderc (France) Jean-Pierre Paoli	Ligier JS2	Maserati 3.0L V6	MI	174	Oil leak (17hr)
DNF	GTS; 5.0	56 (reserve)	(France) Shark Racing Team (private entrant)	(France) Jean-Claude Guérie (France) Cyril Grandet	Ferrari 365 GTB/4	Ferrari 4.4L V12	D	174	Gearbox (17hr)
DNF	S 3.0	7	Équipe Gitanes; Cigarettes de France	(France) Jean-Louis Lafosse (Sweden) Reine Wisell (Belgium) Baron Hughes de Fierlandt	Lola T282	Ford Cosworth DFV 3.0L V8	G	164	Transmission (20hr)
DNF	S 3.0	8	(United Kingdom) Gulf Research Racing	(United Kingdom) Derek Bell (New Zealand) Howden Ganley	Mirage M6	Cosworth DFV 3.0L V8	F	163	Oil pump (18hr)
DNF	TS; 5.0	50	(Germany) BMW Motorsport	(New Zealand) Chris Amon (Germany) Hans-Joachim Stuck	BMW 3.0 CSL	BMW 3.3L S6	D	162	Accident (16hr)
DNF	S 3.0	17	(Italy) SpA Ferrari SEFAC	(Australia) Tim Schenken (Argentina) Carlos Reutemann	Ferrari 312PB-73	Ferrari 3.0L F12	G	162	Engine (12hr)
DNF	S 3.0	10	(France) Equipe Matra-Simca Shell	(France) François Cevert (France) Jean-Pierre Beltoise	Matra-Simca MS670B	Matra 3.0L V12	G	157	Accident (12hr)
DNF	TS; 3.0	53	(Germany) Ford Motorenwerke; Deutschland	(France) Jean Vinatier (Austria) Helmut Koinigg (United Kingdom) Gerry Birrell	Ford Capri LV	Ford 3.0L V6	D	152	Engine (15hr)
DNF	S 2.0	22	(France) R. Touroul (private entrant)	(France) Raymond Touroul (France) Jean-Pierre Rouget	Porsche 910	Porsche 1985cc F6	D	142	Fuel system (13hr)
DNF	GTS; 3.0	49	(France) J. Egreteaud (private entrant)	(France) Jean Egreteaud (France) Jean-Claude Lagniez	Porsche 911 Carrera RS	Porsche 2.8L F6	D	140	Axle (14hr)
DNF	S 3.0	9	(United Kingdom) Gulf Research Racing	(United Kingdom) Mike Hailwood (United Kingdom) John Watson (Australia) Vern Schuppan	Mirage M6	Cosworth DFV 3.0L V8	F	122	Accident (10hr)
DNF	GTS; 3.0	44	(Switzerland) Porsche Club Romand	(France) Jean-François Piot (Switzerland) Peter Zbinden	Porsche 911 Carrera RS	Porsche 2.8L F6	D	110	Gearbox (10hr)
DNF	GTS; 3.0	43	(Germany) Max Moritz Racing Team	(Germany) Gerd Qvist (Germany) Manfred Laub (Germany) Jürgen Zink	Porsche 911 Carrera RS	Porsche 2.8L F6	G	103	Accident (10hr)
DNF	GTS; 3.0	78 (reserve)	(France) J. Sage (private entrant)	(France) Hervé Bayard (France) René Ligonnet	Porsche 911 Carrera RS	Porsche 2.8L F6	F	95	Engine (10hr)
DNF	S 2.0	21	(France) P. Maublanc (private entrant)	(France) Pierre Maublanc (France) Robert Mieusset	Chevron B21/B23	BMW-Schnitzer M12 1991cc S4	F	90	Engine (9hr)
DNF	S 3.0	14	(France) Equipe Matra-Simca Shell	(France) Patrick Depailler (France) Bob Wollek	Matra-Simca MS670B	Matra 3.0L V12	G	84	Oil pump (8hr)
DNF	S 3.0	5	(United Kingdom) Duckhams Oil; Motor Racing	(United Kingdom) Alain de Cadenet (United Kingdom) Chris Craft	Duckhams LM72	Cosworth DFV 3.0L V8	D	81	Transmission (13hr)
DNF	S 2.5	26	(Japan) Sigma Automotive	(Japan) Tetsu Ikuzawa (Japan) Hiroshi Fushida (France) Patrick Dal Bo	Sigma MC73	Mazda 12A 2-Rotor (2.3L equiv.)	B	79	Transmission (12hr)
DNF	S 3.0	47	(Germany) Martini Racing Team	(Germany) Reinhold Joest (Switzerland) Claude Haldi	Porsche 911 Carrera RSR	Porsche 2.8L F6	D	65	Out of fuel (7hr)
DNF	S 2.0	28	(France) J. Henry (private entrant)	(France) Jacques Henry (France) Fred Stalder (France) Bernard-Etienne Grobot	Lola T290	Cosworth FVC 1850cc S4	G	64	Engine (8hr)
DNF	S 2.0	27	(Spain) Escuderia Montjuïch	(Spain) José Juncadella (Spain) Jorge de Bagration	Chevron B23	Cosworth FVC 1930cc S4	F	52	Gearbox (6hr)
DNF	S 3.0	61 (reserve)	(France) D. Rouveyran (private entrant)	(France) Daniel Rouveyran (France) Christian Mons (France) Christian Ethuin	Lola T280/282	Cosworth DFV 3.0L V8	G	38	Gearbox (5hr)
DNF	GTS +5.0	29	(United States) John Greenwood Racing	(United States) John Greenwood (United States) Bob Johnson	Chevrolet Corvette C3	Chevrolet 7.1L V8	BF	37	Engine (4hr)
DSQ	S 3.0	62 (reserve)	(France) Automobiles Ligier	(France) Guy Ligier (France) Jacques Laffite	Ligier JS2	Maserati 3.0L V6	MI	24	Premature oil refill (4hr)
DNF	S 2.0	2	(Switzerland) Dinitrol Total Blancpain (private entrant)	(France) Roger Dubos (Belgium) Christine Beckers (France) Pierre Pagani	Chevron B21/23	Cosworth FVC 1796cc S4	MI	9	Fuel injection (3hr)
DNF	TS; 3.0	54	(Germany) Ford Motorenwerke; Deutschland	(United Kingdom) Gerry Birrell (Germany) Hans Heyer	Ford Capri RS	Ford 3.0L V6	D	4	Electrics (3hr)
DNF	TS; 5.0	58 (reserve)	(Switzerland) Wicky Racing Team	(Switzerland) Walter Brun (Switzerland) Cox Kocher (Switzerland) Jean-Pierre Aeschlimann	BMW 3.0 CSL	BMW 3.3L S6	F	1	Engine (2hr)

=== Did Not Start ===
Pos	Class	No	Team	Drivers	Chassis	Engine	Tyre	Reason
DNS	S 3.0	57 (reserve)	(France) C. Poirot (private entrant)	(France) Christian Poirot (France) Jean Rondeau (Germany) Jürgen Barth	Porsche 908/02K	Porsche 3.0L F8	D	Did not qualify
DNQ	S 2.0	65 (reserve)	(France) M. Elkoubi (private entrant)	(France) Yves Martin (Italy) Ugo Locatelli (Italy) Massimo Martino	ACE PB-2	Cosworth BDA 1898cc S4	G	Did not qualify
DNQ	S 2.0	66	(United Kingdom) Promoto Racing Services (private entrant)	(United Kingdom) Brian Robinson (Spain) José Uriarte (France) Hervé Leguellec	Chevron B19/21	Cosworth FVC 1850cc S4	F	Did not qualify
DNS	GTS +5.0	68 (reserve)	(United States) John Greenwood Racing	(United States) Don Yenko (United States) Ron Grable (United States) Jim Greendyke	Chevrolet Corvette C3	Chevrolet 7.0L V8	BF	Disqualified
DNQ	GTS; 3.0	75 (reserve)	(Switzerland) Porsche Club Romand	(Switzerland) Pierre Greub (Germany) Paul Keller (France) Philippe Farjon	Porsche 911 Carrera RS	Porsche 2.8cc F6	D	Did not qualify
DNQ	GTS; 3.0	84 (reserve)	(France) L. Meznarie (private entrant)	(France) Jean-Claude Boucher (France) Jacques Guérin (France) Didier Jaunet	Porsche 911 Carrera RS	Porsche 2.8cc F6	D	Reserve

=== Class Winners ===
Class	Sports Winners		Class	Special GT Winners		Class	Special Touring Winners	
Sports 3000	#11 Matra-Simca MS670B	Pescarolo / Larrousse *	GTS >5000	#30 Chevrolet Corvette C3	Greder / Beaumont *	TS		
Sports 2500	no finishers		GTS 5000	#39 Ferrari 365 GTB/4	Elford / Ballot-Léna *	TS 5000	#51 BMW 3.0 CSL	Hezemans / Quester
Sports 2000	no finishers		GTS 3000	#45 Porsche 911 Carrera RSR	Kremer / Keller / Schickentanz	TS 3000	no finishers	

- Note: setting a new class distance record.

=== Index of Thermal Efficiency ===
For Group 2 and Group 4 cars.

Pos	Class	No	Team	Drivers	Chassis	Score
1	GTS; 3.0	45	(Germany) Kremer Racing Team	(Germany) Erwin Kremer (Switzerland) Paul Keller (Germany) Clemens Schickentanz	Porsche 911 Carrera RSR	1.049
2	GTS; 5.0	40	(France) Automobiles Charles Pozzi	(France) Alain Serpaggi (France) José Dolhem	Ferrari 365 GTB/4	1.043
3=	TS; 5.0	51	(Germany) BMW Motorsport	(Netherlands) Toine Hezemans (Austria) Dieter Quester	BMW 3.0 CSL	0.98
3=	GTS; 5.0	39	(France) Automobiles Charles Pozzi	(United Kingdom) Vic Elford (France) Claude Ballot-Léna	Ferrari 365 GTB/4	0.98
3=	GTS; 3.0	63	(Germany) Gelo Racing Team	(Germany) Georg Loos (Germany) Jürgen Barth	Porsche 911 Carrera RSR	0.98
6	GTS; 3.0	41	(Switzerland) Schiller Racing Team (private entrant)	(Switzerland) Jean Selz (Switzerland) Florian Vetsch	Porsche 911 Carrera RS	0.89
7	GTS; 3.0	48	(France) Sonauto BP Racing	(United States) Peter Gregg (France) Guy Chasseuil	Porsche 911 Carrera RSR	0.88
8	GTS +5.0	30	(France) Greder Racing Team	(France) Henri Greder (France) Marie-Claude Beaumont	Chevrolet Corvette C3	0.80
9	GTS; 3.0	42	(France) R. Mazzia (private entrant)	(France) Pierre Mauroy (France) Marcel Mignot	Porsche 911 Carrera RS	0.77
10	GTS +5.0	69 (reserve)	(France) Écurie Léopard	(France) Jean-Claude Aubriet (France) “Depnic” (Jean-Claude Depince)	Chevrolet Corvette C3	0.73

- Note: Only the top ten positions are included in this set of standings.

=== Statistics ===
Taken from Quentin Spurring's book, officially licensed by the ACO

- Fastest Lap in practice –A.Merzario, #16 Ferrari 312 PB-73 – 3:37.5secs; 225.77 km/h (140.29 mph)
- Fastest Lap – F. Cevert, #10 Matra-Simca MS670B – 3:39.6secs; 223.61 km/h (138.94 mph)
- Winning Distance – 4,853.94 km (3,016.10 mi)
- Winner's Average Speed – 202.25 km/h (125.67 mph)
- Attendance – ?

=== International Championship for Makes Standings ===
As calculated after Le Mans, Round 8 of 10

Pos	Manufacturer	Points
1	(Italy) Ferrari	85 (110)*
2	(France) Matra	84
3	(West Germany) Porsche	68 (82)*
4	(United Kingdom) Lola	36
5	(United Kingdom) Chevron	29
6	(United Kingdom) Mirage	28
7	(Italy) Lancia	15
8	(United States) Chevrolet	12
9	(Italy) Alfa Romeo	9

- Note: Only the best 7 of 10 results counted to the final Championship points. The full total earned to date is given in brackets

Citations
