= Hans Heyer =

German racing driver (born 1943)

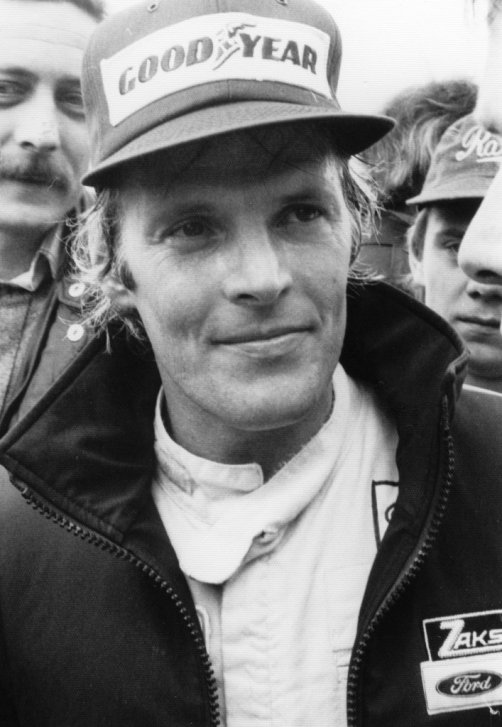
- Nationality: (Germany) German
- Born: Johann Josef Heyer; 16 March 1943 (age 83) Mönchengladbach, Rhine Province, Free State of Prussia, Nazi Germany

Championship titles
- Dutch Karting Championship (1962, 1963); Deutsche Kart-Meisterschaft (1968, 1969, 1970, 1971); Karting European Championship (1969, 1970, 1971); European Touring Car Championship (1974); Deutsche Rennsport Meisterschaft (1975, 1976, 1980); Major victories Brignoles 24 Hour Classic (1969, 1971); Kyalami 9 Hours (1975, 1977); 24 Hours of Spa (1982, 1983, 1984); 12 Hours of Sebring (1984)

Formula One World Championship career
- Active years: 1977
- Team: ATS
- Entries: 1 (no legal starts)
- Championships: 0
- Wins: 0
- Podiums: 0
- Career points: 0
- Pole positions: 0
- Fastest laps: 0
- First entry: 1977 German Grand Prix

Johann Josef "Hans" Heyer (German pronunciation: [hans ˈhaɪ̯ɐ]; born 16 March 1943) is a German retired racing driver who mainly raced touring cars. He is most commonly known for starting one Formula One World Championship race, the 1977 German Grand Prix, despite failing to qualify.

Heyer's trademark during his racing days was a Tirolerhut, a hat from Tyrol or Bavaria.

== Early life ==
Johann Josef Heyer was born in Mönchengladbach, Germany to parents who ran a bitumen and a concrete mixing company. Heyer developed his passion for motor racing and engineering when he was at boarding school at Adenau, which is near the Nürburgring. He later started an apprenticeship with Daimler-Benz as a mechanic which was completed in 1962.

== Racing career ==
=== 1960s ===
Living close to the Netherlands and not yet allowed to race in Germany at the age of 16, Heyer started his career there in 1959 with karts and won the 1962 Dutch Championship in the 100cc category which he followed up by winning the 125cc class in 1963. In an attempt to race in his native Germany, he initially encountered problems with his racing license but managed to compete in the Formula K class in 1965 finishing third in the next two years and backed up with the German and European Formula K titles in 1968 to 1971 driving in a Taifun/BM. Heyer also raced in France by competing in the Brignoles 24 Hour Classic in 1969 to 1971 winning twice and finished second in 1970.

=== 1970s ===
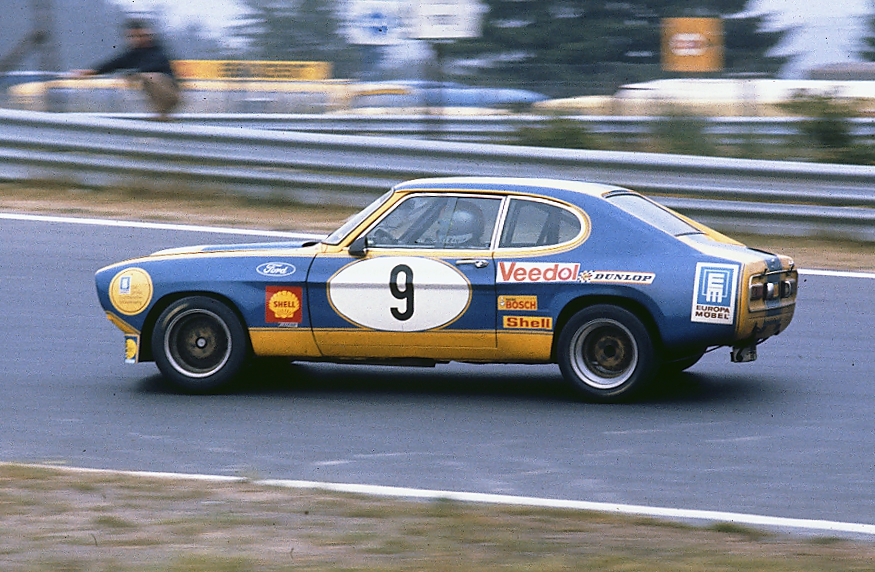
Hans Heyer driving a Ford Capri at the Nürburgring in 1973

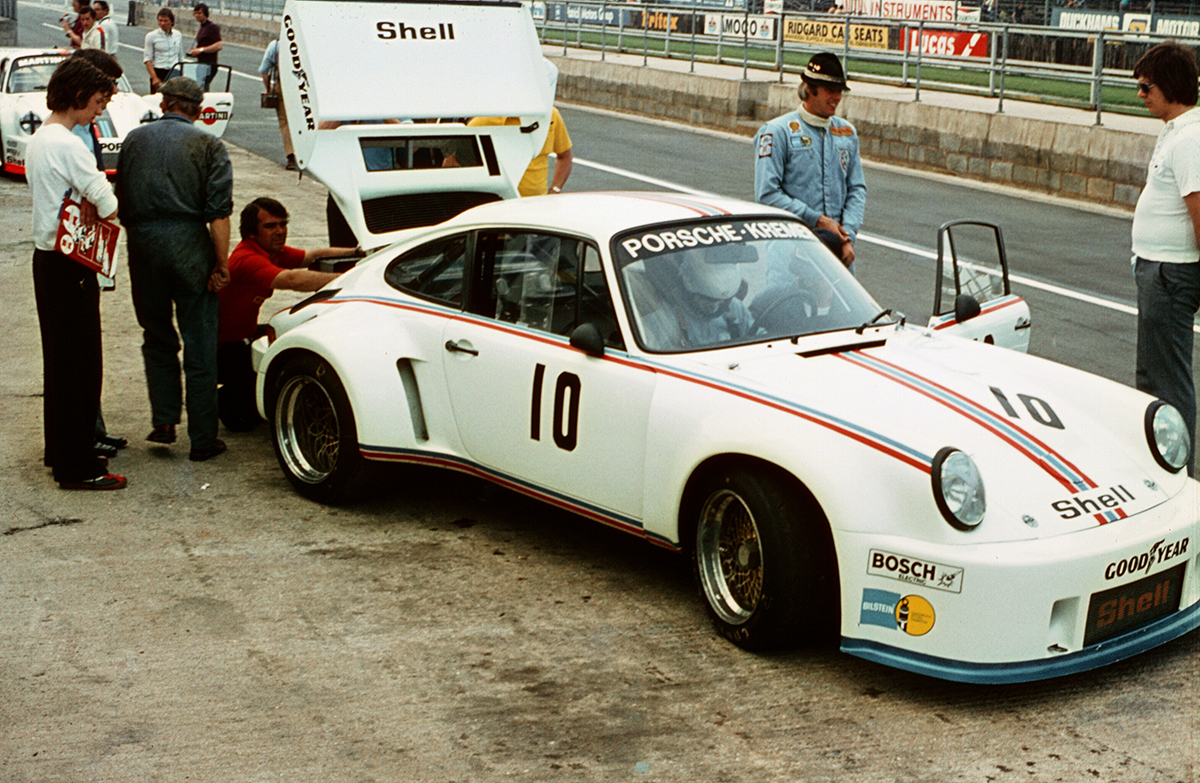
Heyer with his Tyrolean hat next to the Kremer-Porsche 935 K1, 1976 Silverstone 6h

For many years, Heyer was associated with Zakspeed, racing their Group 2 Ford Escorts in the European Touring Car Championship (champion 1974) and the Deutsche Rennsport Meisterschaft (champion 1975 and 1976). Heyer attempted two European F2 races in 1976, finishing sixth at the first Hockenheim race. He failed to qualify for the second Hockenheim race and made no further attempts in F2.

In his single attempt at Formula One, Heyer entered the 1977 German Grand Prix on 31 July 1977 with the second Penske car of the new German team ATS. With little experience in single seaters and a bad car, he did not qualify. He was the third reserve driver, meaning that he would get the chance to race if three drivers dropped out. But since Frank Williams chose not to prepare his driver Patrick Nève, who was the first reserve, for the race, and since Emilio de Villota, who was the second reserve, had a last-moment engine failure before the race, Heyer had effectively become the first reserve driver. Because of the crash and commotion on the starting grid at the start of the race, Heyer chose to start the race anyway, slipping out of the pits and joining the pack. Only when his gearbox failed after 9 laps was it realised that Heyer should not have been competing, whereupon he was disqualified. He never attempted another race in Formula One. He is the only driver to be credited with a DNQ (did not qualify), DNF (did not finish), and DSQ (disqualified) in the same race, technically being banned from 5 Formula One races afterwards (which effectively became a lifetime ban because he had no intention to compete any further in Formula One).

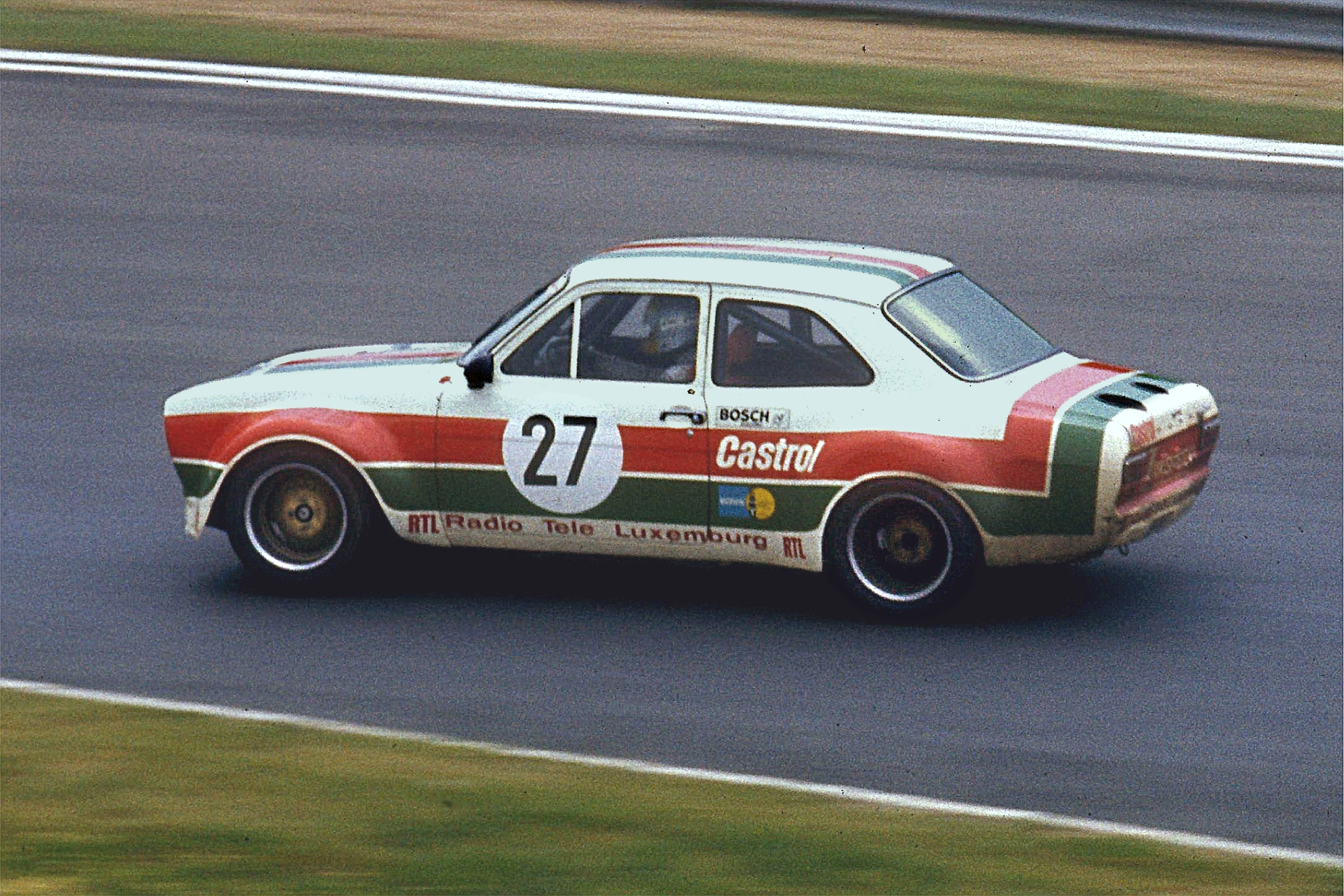
Heyer driving a Ford Escort in 1974

=== 1980s ===
In 1980, Heyer won the DRM again, this time for Lancia in a Group 5 Lancia Monte Carlo Turbo, a car he also helped develop. He crashed his 480 hp car badly at the Norisring in Nuremberg, rolling several times. Heyer switched to continuations cooling when control of the water supply failed when the brake light switch failed which had not worked resulting in the left front brake caliper failing which destroyed the tie rod and a burst affected the front left tyre. He escaped unhurt, but returned immediately to the wreck to recover his famous hat. In the following medical exam, the doctor was said to have been more nervous than Hans was.

Heyer won the 12 Hours of Sebring race in 1984 driving alongside Stefan Johansson and Mauricio de Narvaez in a Porsche 935.

During the years that the Spa 24 Hours was run as part of the European Touring Car Championship and the inaugural World Touring Car Championship (1982–1988), Heyer won the race three times in succession. He won in 1982 driving a BMW 528i with Armin Hahne and Eddy Joosen, 1983 in a BMW 635 CSi with Hahne and Thierry Tassin, and finally in 1984 driving a TWR Jaguar XJS with Tom Walkinshaw and Win Percy. Heyer retired in 1989 after 999 races in 30 years.

=== 1990s ===
Between 1990 and 1991, Heyer worked at his family concrete works business but came out of retirement to test Mercedes-Benz's truck racing vehicles and competed in the Nürburgring Truck Grand Prix in 1992. Heyer returned to the same track in 1994 to compete in the Nürburgring 24 Hours alongside Heiner Weiss, Rainer Braun driving a BMW M3 and returned to compete in the same race in 1995 albeit in a BMW veterans 'Dream Team'. Heyer also competed in the Nürburgring 500 km race in 1997.

=== 2000s ===
In 2004, Volkswagen director Kris Nissen found out Heyer's next race would be his 1000th and invited Heyer to race in the ADAC Volkswagen Polo Cup at the Norisring against youngsters.

== Personal life ==
Heyer's son Kenneth Heyer is also a racing driver, currently involved in the Blancpain GT Series Endurance Cup driving a Mercedes-AMG GT3 for MANN-FILTER HTP Motorsport.

== Racing record ==
=== Complete 24 Hours of Le Mans results ===
Year	Team	Co-Drivers	Car	Class	Laps	Pos.	Class Pos.
1972	(Germany) Team Schnitzer Motul	(Switzerland) René Herzog	BMW 2800CS	T 3.0	70	DNF	DNF
1973	(Germany) Ford Motorwerke	(United Kingdom) Gerry Birrell	Ford Capri RS	T 3.0	4	DNF	DNF
1973	(Germany) Ford Motorwerke	(Germany) Dieter Glemser (United Kingdom) John Fitzpatrick	Ford Capri RS	T 3.0	239	DNF	DNF
1974	(Germany) Samson Kremer Racing	(Switzerland) Paul Keller (Germany) Erwin Kremer	Porsche 911 Carrera RSR	GT	65	DNF	DNF
1976	(Germany) Porsche Kremer Racing	(Mexico) Juan Carlos Bolaños (Mexico) Eduardo Lopez Negrete (Mexico) Billy Sprowls	Porsche 935	Gr.5	272	DNF	DNF
1977	(Germany) Gelo Racing Team	(Netherlands) Toine Hezemans (Australia) Tim Schenken	Porsche 935	Gr.5	15	DNF	DNF
1977	(Germany) Gelo Racing Team	(Netherlands) Toine Hezemans (Australia) Tim Schenken	Porsche 935	Gr.5	269	DNF	DNF
1979	(Germany) Gelo Racing Sportswear Intl	(Liechtenstein) Manfred Schurti	Porsche 935	Gr.5 +2.5	201	DNF	DNF
1980	(Italy) Scuderia Lancia Corse	(France) Bernard Darniche (Italy) Teo Fabi	Lancia Beta Monte Carlo	Gr.5	6	DNF	DNF
1981	(Italy) Martini Racing	(Italy) Riccardo Patrese (Italy) Piercarlo Ghinzani	Lancia Beta Monte Carlo	Gr.5	186	DNF	DNF
1982	(Italy) Martini Racing	(Italy) Riccardo Patrese (Italy) Piercarlo Ghinzani	Lancia LC1	Gr.6	152	DNF	DNF
1983	(Italy) Martini Racing	(Italy) Michele Alboreto (Italy) Piercarlo Ghinzani	Lancia LC2	C	121	DNF	DNF
1984	(Italy) Martini Racing	(Italy) Paolo Barilla (Italy) Mauro Baldi	Lancia LC2	C1	275	DNF	DNF
1986	(United Kingdom) Silk Cut Jaguar	(United Kingdom) Brian Redman (United States) Hurley Haywood	Jaguar XJR-6	C1	53	DNF	DNF

=== Complete European Formula Two Championship results ===
(key) (Races in bold indicate pole position; races in italics indicate fastest lap)

Year	Entrant	Chassis	Engine	1	2	3	4	5	6	7	8	9	10	11	12	Pos	Pts
1976	Team Warsteiner Eurorace	Toj F201	BMW	HOC; 7	THR	VLL	SAL	PAU	HOC; DNQ	ROU	MUG	PER	EST	NOG	HOC	17th	1

=== Complete Formula One results ===
(key)

Year	Entrant	Chassis	Engine	1	2	3	4	5	6	7	8	9	10	11	12	13	14	15	16	17	WDC	Points
1977	ATS Racing Team	Penske PC4	Cosworth V8	ARG	BRA	RSA	USW	ESP	MON	BEL	SWE	FRA	GBR	GER; DSQ^{‡}	AUT	NED	ITA	USA	CAN	JPN	NC	0

^{‡} Started illegally after failing to qualify and did not finish.

== Bibliography ==
- Michael Behrndt, Ferdi Kräling & Uwe Mahla (1 July 2014). Hans Heyer – Rennsport am Limit (in German). Sportfahrer Verlag. ISBN 978-3945390023.

Sporting positions
Preceded by Toine Hezemans	European Touring Car Championship champion 1974	Succeeded by Alain Peltier and Siegfried Müller Sr.
Preceded by Dieter Glemser	Deutsche Rennsport Meisterschaft Champion; 1975–1976	Succeeded by Rolf Stommelen
Preceded by Klaus Ludwig	Deutsche Rennsport Meisterschaft Champion; 1980	Succeeded by Klaus Ludwig
