= Dick Smothers =

American actor, comedian, composer, and musician (born 1938)

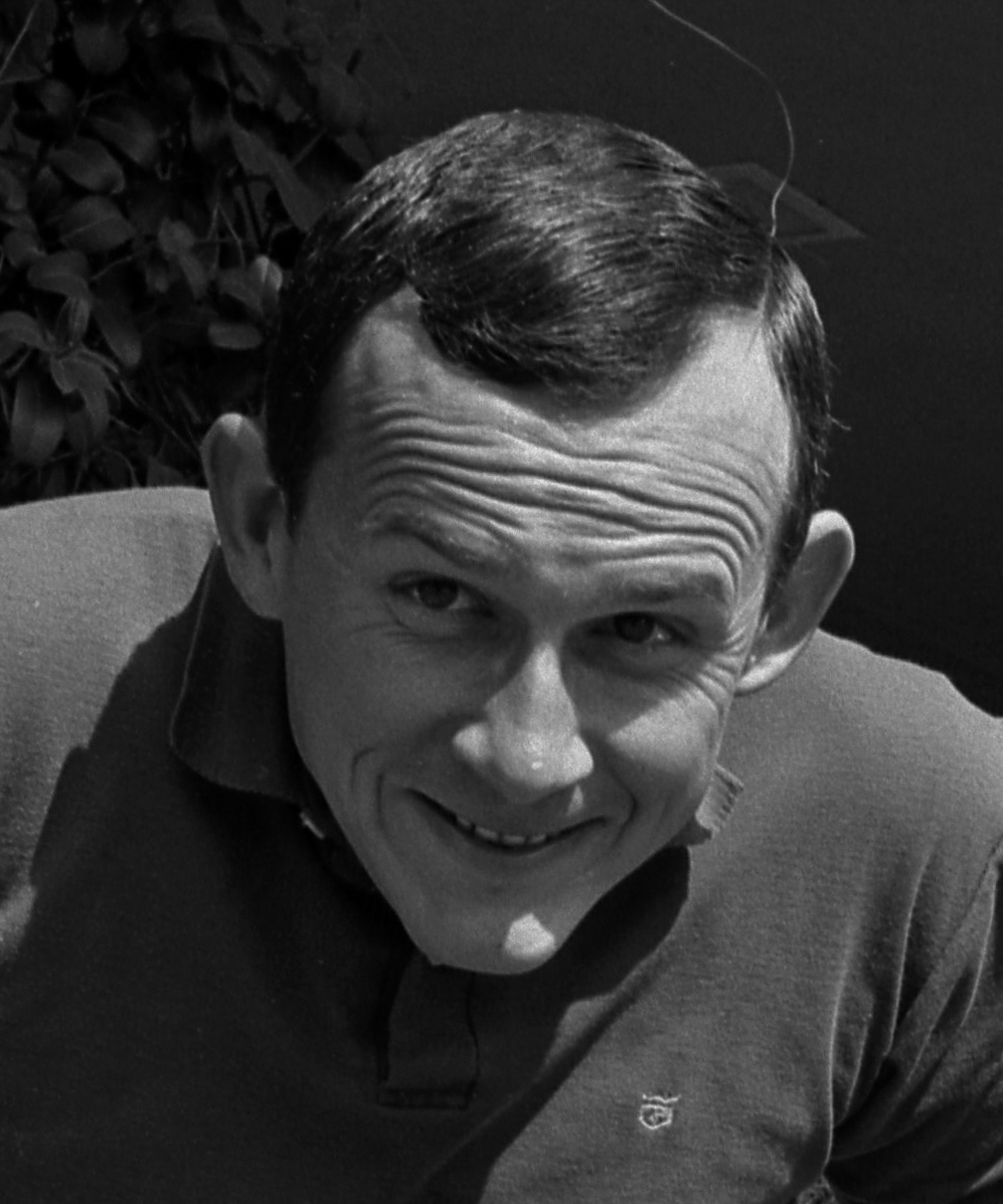
- Smothers in 1966
- Born: Richard Remick Smothers; November 20, 1938 (age 87); New York City, New York, U.S.
- Education: San Jose State University
- Occupations: Actor; comedian; composer; musician
- Years active: 1959–2010, 2019
- Spouses: Linda Miller (m. 1959; div. 1969) (m. 1972; div. 1984) Lorraine Martin (m. 1986; div. 1997) Denby Franklin (m. 1997; div. 2006) Marie Navaroli Kropp (m. 2022)
- Children: 6
- Relatives: Tom Smothers (brother)
- Musical career
- Genre: Folk
- Instruments: Vocals, bass
- Formerly of: Smothers Brothers

Richard Remick Smothers (born November 20, 1938) is an American actor, comedian, composer, and musician, best known as one half of the folk‑comedy duo the Smothers Brothers, alongside his older brother Tom Smothers.

== Early life ==
Smothers was born in New York City in 1938, the son of Ruth (née Remick), a homemaker, and Thomas B. Smothers, an Army officer who died as a prisoner of war of the Japanese in April 1945. His middle name, Remick, originates from his mother's maiden name.

After moving to Southern California, Dick attended Verdugo Hills High School in Tujunga, California, and graduated from Redondo Union High School in Redondo Beach, California, and later attended San Jose State University, then called San Jose State College. At SJSC, Smothers participated as a distance runner for the track team, coached by Lloyd (Bud) Winter.

== Career ==
=== The Smothers Brothers ===
The Smothers Brothers formed in the late 1950s and appeared on numerous television shows, including two shows of their own: The Smothers Brothers Show, a sitcom from 1965 to 1966; and The Smothers Brothers Comedy Hour, a variety show in 1967. The show was cancelled by CBS on April 4, 1969. After filing a lawsuit, the Smothers were given $776,300. Though he often aided Tom with various subjects which were deemed controversial, Dick was in reality "more conservative politically" than his older brother was, with Tom stating in 2006, "We still disagree about everything."

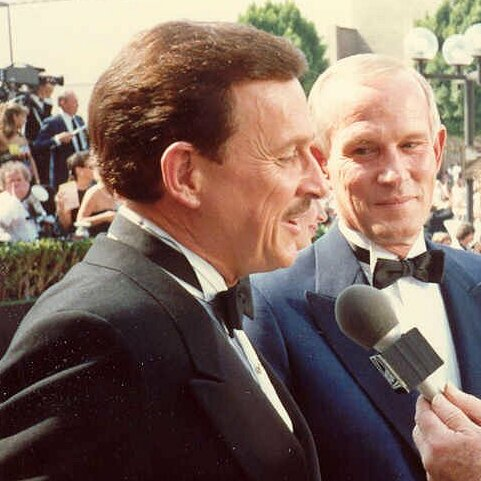
Dick (left) and Tom Smothers in August 1988

In December 2009, Dick and Tom both guest-starred in a 21st-season episode of The Simpsons that also featured Cooper, Peyton, and Eli Manning.

The Smothers Brothers both announced their retirement from touring in May 2010. On the December 11, 2022, episode of CBS News Sunday Morning, the brothers announced that they would be going on tour in 2023. However, the tour was cancelled and Tom Smothers announced in July 2023 that he was diagnosed with stage 2 lung cancer. He died on December 26, 2023, at the age of 86.

=== Other works ===
In 1977, he appeared twice as a panelist on the daytime TV game show Match Game. In 1993, he played one of the characters on cartoon Christmas movie Precious Moments: Timmy's Special Delivery. Without Tom, he also appeared in the 1995 Martin Scorsese-directed film Casino in an uncharacteristically serious role as a dishonest Nevada State Senator. His character and the dialogue in one scene were partly based on the career of former United States Senator Harry Reid, who once chaired the Nevada Gaming Commission.

Smothers has been active in amateur auto racing, both road racing and drag racing. He started the Smothers Brothers racing team, which competed in three championship seasons between 1968 and 1971. He specialized in endurance racing and drove cars at the famous Sebring and Le Mans events.

== Personal life ==
In 2004, Smothers was taken to court in a domestic violence incident by his then-wife Denby after she accused him of intentionally pushing her into her car and poking his finger into her chest, allegedly saying, "You have no rights to our house" and that "Our marriage is over." Denby and Dick Smothers filed for divorce in late 2005, and it was finalized in 2006. Their condo in Bird Key, Florida, was later foreclosed on and sold for just under $90,000.

In a 2006 interview with the Vancouver-based Comedy Couch, Tom Smothers stated that he and his brother actually "disagree about everything" and that while he was "a little bit looser," Dick was "more conservative politically and also is a pragmatist. He's very pragmatic and wants everything to line up and put in a box."

In February 2010, Smothers filed for Chapter 11 bankruptcy protection. In May, he and his brother announced their retirement from touring. In October 2010, he announced he had been diagnosed with Barrett's esophagus.

He is the father of six children — Dick Jr., Andrew, Steven, Sarah, Susan, and Remick. As of 2026, he resides in Lewiston, New York. In September 2022, Smothers married Marie Navarolli Kropp.

== Filmography ==
| Year | Title | Role | Notes |
|---|---|---|---|
| 1966 | Alice Through the Looking Glass | Tweedledee | |
| 1989 | Speed Zone | Nelson van Sloan | |
| 1995 | Casino | Senator Harrison Roberts | |
| 1997 | The Debtors | | |
| 2009 | The Informant! | Judge Harold Baker | |

== Racing results ==
=== 24 Hours of Le Mans results ===
| Year | Team | Co-Driver(s) | Car | Class | Laps | Pos. | Class Pos. |
|---|---|---|---|---|---|---|---|
| 1972 | (United States) John Greenwood Racing | (United States) John Greenwood | Chevrolet Corvette C3 | GTS +5.0 | 53 | DNF | DNF |
