= 1972 24 Hours of Le Mans =

40th 24 Hours of Le Mans endurance race

Previous: 1971	Next: 1973
Index: Races | Winners

The 1972 24 Hours of Le Mans was a motor race staged at the Circuit de la Sarthe, Le Mans, France on 10 and 11 June 1972. It was the 40th running of the 24 Hours of Le Mans and the ninth race of the 1972 World Championship for Makes.

1972 marked the start of a new era with revised FIA regulations dictating the demise of the 5 Litre Group 5 Sports Car and the 3 Litre Group 6 Sports Prototype categories and their replacement by a new 3 Litre Group 5 Sports Car class. There was also a significant change to the track with the construction of the new technical section subsequently named the Porsche Curves bypassing the dangerous Maison Blanche corner, which had been the site of many serious accidents in the past.

Having already won the World Championship for Makes, Ferrari chose not to contest the race. Matra-Simca were strong favourites for the outright win after not running the other races to focus on its Le Mans preparation. Once the challenge from Alfa Romeo and Lola had dissipated overnight, Matra were able to ease off to secure a popular 1–2 victory for the home country – France's first since 1950. Henri Pescarolo and Graham Hill were the winners, with a comfortable 11-lap margin over teammates François Cevert and Howden Ganley.

However the race was marred by the death of veteran Formula One racer Jo Bonnier who died when his Lola prototype collided with a Ferrari GT and flew over the barriers into the trees on the Sunday morning.

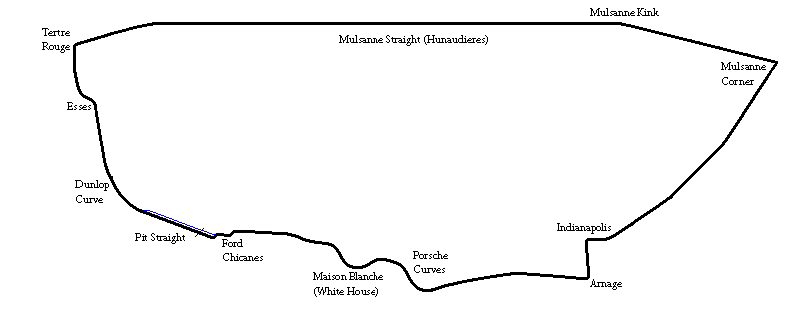
Le Mans in 1972

== Regulations ==
Once again, the CSI (Commission Sportive Internationale - the FIA’s regulations body) overhauled its FIA Appendix J, redefining its motorsport categories. The former Group 6 Prototypes and Group 5 Sports categories were combined into a new, third-generation, Group 5 Sports Car class with a 3-litre engine limit (or 2142cc if turbo-powered, using the x1.4 equivalency) with a minimum weight of 650 kg (1,433 lb). There was also no minimum production required. Not for the last time, the FIA’s idea was to encourage manufacturers to build, develop and use engines based around the current Formula One 3.0-litre standard.

Recognising the growing interest in touring car racing, the Automobile Club de l'Ouest (ACO) opened the entry list to Group 2 Special Touring Cars, alongside the Group 4 Special GTs and the new Group 5. Entries for the Group 2 and 4 categories had a 2-litre minimum but no upper limit on engine size. They also revamped the minimum distance and speed requirements. No longer a set lap-time to qualify, all cars had to be within 140% of an average of the three best practice laps put up. Also the sliding scale of target distances was discarded. Now cars had to achieve at least 70% of its class winner to be classified. Therefore the Index of Performance, now redundant, was discontinued. Also, the Index of Thermal Efficiency now only applied to Group 2 and 4.

But the biggest change was to the track layout, with a new series of technical curves being built between Arnage and the Ford chicane bypassing the dangerously fast Maison Blanche section. Financed by Porsche, it therefore became known as the “Porsche curves”. The Ford chicane was also redesigned with a second chicane added just up the track to allow a dedicated pit-lane entrance lane to be built. This allowed cars to decelerate off the racing line and off the main track, greatly increasing safety. Although the modifications only added 71 m (232 ft 11.28 in) to the overall track length, there was a noticeable change in lap times slowing the prototypes' average speeds by 30 km/h (18 mph). The circuit still had cars using full throttle for over 65% of the lap however.

Prize money this year included FF80000 (£6400) for outright victory, and half that to the respective winners of the GT category and Index of Thermal Efficiency.

== Entries ==
With the new regulations there were 91 applications, and this led to a solid 66 arriving for practice and for the first time for a few years a full grid of 55 cars took the start.

Category	Sports Cars Group 5	Special GT Groups 4	Special Touring Group 2	Total Entries
Large-engines >2.5L classes	13 (+8 reserves)	13 (+6 reserves)	3 (+2 reserves)	29 (+16 reserves)
Medium-engines < 2.5L classes	4 (+2 reserves)	9 (+3 reserves)	0	13 (+5 reserves)
Total Cars	17 (+11 reserves)	22 (+9 reserves)	3 (+2 reserves)	42 (+22 reserves)

In a major surprise, after winning every round in the Championship to date, and dominating the timing in the Test Weekend in March, Ferrari withdrew its works team less than a fortnight before the race. Having just secured the World Championship title, it claimed the engines on the Group 5 312 PB were only good for the 1000 km races, and not 24 hours. This did not sound convincing however, since they had achieved a 1–2 victory at the 12 Hours of Sebring, but during a 24-hour simulation run the flat-12 engine in the Ferrari blew up during the 14th hour. Alfa Romeo had voiced the same concern about their engines’ durability but still showed up to Le Mans. John Wyer also chose not to bring his team's Gulf-Mirages because their Weslake V12 engines were not ready and under-prepared.

Although everyone had been outclassed by the Porsche 917s in 1971, Alfa Romeo had proven the most competitive, even getting three wins that season. For 1972 they had developed the latest iteration of the Tipo 33, the open-top T33/3. Designer Carlo Chiti used a tubular chassis rather than a full monocoque making them narrower and 50 kg lighter. The 3-litre V8 developed 445 bhp. The team picked up a number of ex-Porsche drivers for the three cars entered: Vic Elford/Helmut Marko, Rolf Stommelen/”Nanni” Galli and Nino Vaccarella/Andrea de Adamich.

Matra, like Jaguar in the 1950s, chose to concentrate its efforts for the prestige of a Le Mans victory. The latest version of the 660, the MS660C had been over a second slower than Ickx's Ferrari at the test weekend. But a new model, the MS670 was entered for the race. The 3-litre V12 was detuned for the race down to 450 bhp, pushing it to 310 kp/h (195 mph) on the Mulsanne Straight. With the French media stirring up a patriotic fervour, team director Gérard Ducarouge took no chances and bought 4 cars and 60 crew. Aerodynamic long-tail versions were prepared for Jean-Pierre Beltoise/Chris Amon and François Cevert/Howden Ganley while Henri Pescarolo/Graham Hill (back at Le Mans for the first time since 1966) had a short-tail version. The fourth car was the reliable 660C, given to Jean-Pierre Jabouille/ David Hobbs.

Porsche was now focussing its efforts on its 917 Can-Am project. However, Reinhold Joest got considerable unofficial factory assistance with his 908 LH entry, and sponsored by ATE. The three-year old car had been owned by Jo Siffert who had been killed less than a year ago, and was loaned from the Schlumpf Collection. It was refitted by Porsche with a new 3-litre engine capable of 360 bhp. Other customer teams brought Porsche Group 5 cars: the Spanish Escuderia Montjuich had a 908/03, André Wicky’s Swiss team had one of several 908/02s as well as an older 907.

Jo Bonnier, Lola’s European agent, convinced Eric Broadley to develop a 3-litre version of its successful T210. Designed by Patrick Head and John Barnard, the new T280 used the Cosworth DFV engine. It was very fast and had easily won the four-hour race at the Test Weekend. With works-support, Bonnier entered two cars: one for himself and 1971 winner Gijs van Lennep (released from Mirage for the race) and the other for Gérard Larrousse/Hughes de Fierlandt. Sponsored by Swiss cheese, they were this year’s art-cars painted up with gruyere cheese-holes. There were also a pair of privateer entries.

After a positive first run at Le Mans the previous year, Brit Alain de Cadenet decided to build his own car to race. He employed Brabham designer Gordon Murray to build a car around the Cosworth DFV (developing 390 bhp) and Brabham BT33 suspension. The lightest of the 3-litre prototypes, De Cadenet got sponsorship from Duckhams Oil and the car was just ready in time for the race. Guy Ligier, keen to progress his JS-2 GT racecar, approached Citroën about getting a Maserati engine – whom they had bought out three years previously. They obliged and three 3-litre V6 JS-2s were present. Because insufficient numbers had been produced it had to run in the Group 5 category.

Ferrari had not released its Group 5 car to its customer teams yet, but had been able to homologate the 365 GTB/4 “Daytona” as a GT car, and nine of those cars were entered by the Ferrari agents of six different countries. These comprised Luigi Chinetti’s North American Racing Team (NART), Jacques Swaters’ Ecurie Francorchamps, Georges Filipinetti's Swiss team, Colonel Ronnie Hoare's Maranello Concessionaires from London and Charles Pozzi’s Paris-based team.

Chevrolet had five entries this year to take on the Ferrari challenge. The French teams of Henri Greder (once again with Marie-Claude Beaumont as his co-driver) and the Ecurie Léopard returned. American John Greenwood also brought a pair of specially lightened Corvettes that proved to be very fast, reaching 330 kp/h (210 mph) on the Mulsanne Straight. They ran on standard BF Goodrich radial road-tyres. Their competitor, Goodyear tyres, had run successfully with the Florida-based English Racing Team winning the GT division at Daytona and Sebring. They asked NART if they could use an entry to get to Le Mans, who agreed as long as the car displayed the Ferrari motif on the side of the car.

A new manufacturer for Le Mans was the Italian De Tomaso company. The newly homologated Pantera had a Ford 5.3-litre V8, pushing out 330 bhp was less powerful than the Ferrari and Chevrolet competition. Four cars were entered and the Spanish Escuderia Montjuich ones had strong works support.

In the smaller GT-category, there were seven Porsche 911s from privateer teams. This year NART ran a Dino 246 on behalf of Ferrari to contest the 2.5-litre class. Once again, NART offered its junior car to winners of the Trofeo Chinetti - a competition for young drivers.

The European Touring Car Championship (ETCC) was proving popular with manufacturers and spectators. When the ACO opened the entry list to Group 2 cars, the Ford-Germany works team calculated that their pace in winning the Spa 24 Hours could get them into the top-10 overall at Le Mans. Three cars were prepared: the Capri RS2600 was refitted with a 2.9-litre V6 that could put out almost 300 bhp. Its drivers were all Le Mans debutants: current ETCC champion Dieter Glemser with Alex Soler-Roig, Jochen Mass/Hans-Joachim Stuck and Birrell/Bourgoignie. Their opposition in the ETCC was the Schnitzer Motorsport team running a BMW 2800 CS. Although BMW had recently head-hunted Jochen Neerpasch from Ford-Germany to set up BMW Motorsport, this was essentially a privateer effort for the company's first post-war entry. Despite the BMW's 3-litre engine putting out 340 bhp, the car was 250 kg heavier. The other entry was a British entry of an ex-rally Datsun 240Z.

== Practice ==
Ferrari was fastest in the test weekend in March with a 3:40.4, but they were a no-show for race-week. On the damp first night of practice on Wednesday, it was Stommelen in the Alfa Romeo and Larrousse in the Bonnier-Lola who set the pace. The session was cut short though by a serious accident when an advertising hoarding blew onto the track. The Thompson/Heinz Corvette was damaged but the next lap the 2-litre GRAC sports-prototype crashed and burst into flames. Driver Lionel Noghès (grandson of Antony Noghès, founder of the Monaco GP), received serious burns to his face. Matra went all out on Thursday and salvaged French pride with a 1-2-3 qualification for Cevert (3:42.2), Pescarolo and Beltoise. Stommelen (3:47.9) and Bonnier were next then Elford's and Vaccarella's Alfas in sixth and seventh. The fourth Matra of Jabouille headed Larrousse with the Joest Porsche (4:03.3) and de Cadenet's Duckhams performing impressively for the cars’ age and youth respectively.

Fastest GT was Migault in his Ferrari in 20th (4:21.7), and the best Touring Car was the Capri of Mass/Stuck in 30th (4:25.9). As if to prove a point, the Capris were right among the Daytonas, faster than most of the Corvettes, Panteras and Porsche 911s. Three of the Panteras blew their engines, traced to a faulty batch of pistons from the US. Fastest in the small GT class was the Kremer 911 which did manage an identical time to the Capri (despite reserve driver Bolanos rolling the car in practice). Last on the grid were the young NART drivers in the Dino (4:53.9), getting in when several faster cars were withdrawn.

== Race ==
=== Start ===
For the first time a French President was the honorary starter. In front of Georges Pompidou and a large partisan crowd, Matra started with all four of their French drivers. Pescarolo took the lead from Cevert on the first lap but things started going wrong straight away. On the second lap, Beltoise's engine expired on the front straight and then Bonnier cut through to take the lead on the third lap. During a short rain-shower, Bonnier's teammate de Fierlandt put in some quick laps to take the lead. But the Lolas’ smaller fuel-tanks meant they had to pit earlier, and more often, than the other prototypes. After that, it was the Alfa Romeos’ chance to take up the challenge as first Elford, then Stommelen moved up the order. In the GT class, Migault's French Ferrari had the lead until a jammed gearbox sidelined it, whereupon the sister car of Ballot-Léna/Andruet took over. Three of the Panteras had already retired due to the dodgy pistons – the remaining one of Claude Dubois being the only one that had not used a new American engine.

At 6:20 pm, the Jabouille/Hobbs Matra 660 ran out of fuel within reach of the pits. Someone had accidentally flicked it across to the reserve tank, which dropped them down to 12th and 5 laps down. After four hours, the two Matra 670s were being pursued by Larrousse in the Lola. Stommelen had been delayed by a fuel-pump change but the Alfas still ran fourth, fifth and seventh split by Joest's Porsche. Weigel's 908/02 was eighth followed by the Duckhams and the charging Matra 660. The Pozzi Ferrari led GT in 12th and the Glemser/Soler-Roig Capri was 15th.

Another short shower wet the track and de Fierlandt put his car in the sandbank at the Mulsanne corner. He then burnt out an already weakened clutch trying to extricate himself. The Bonnier/van Lennep Lola had also been delayed by gear selection issues and when Bonnier had a tyre blowout at the Mulsanne kink at 320 kp/h (200 mph).

=== Night ===
As night fell and the track dried, Bonnier and van Lennep were putting in quick times to catch up and set the fastest lap of the race with a 3:46.9. At quarter-distance still had the two Matras swapping the lead (89 laps) with a comfortable 3-lap margin over the three Alfa Romeos. Sixth was Joest (84 laps) The Ferraris had a strong hold on GT as the Corvette engines failed; Pozzi leading NART (both 77 laps) while the three Capris were running like clockwork (76 laps).

But during the night first Vaccarella then Elford had clutch problems and each lost half an hour as new ones were fitted. So, by half time, at 4am, the Matras were running 1-2-3. The 670s still exchanging the lead at pit stops (178 laps) and the 660 recovering well, having just overtaken the Alfas (running Stommelen, Elford then Vaccarella - all 171 laps). Seventh was Joest's longtail Porsche (167) with the hard-charging Lola back up to eighth, 15 laps behind the leaders. With Weigel's Porsche ninth (161) and the Duckhams tenth (155 laps) the field was now very strung out. Things were still the same in GT – Pozzi and NART Ferraris on 154 laps, while Mass and Stuck (151) had stolen a 3-lap lead over the team cars in Group 2.

=== Morning ===
Right through the night the two leading Matras stayed on the same lap, exchanging places based on pit strategy. A misty dawn broke up the routine, as the Alfa Romeos fell away with their engine issues. The Lola lost over an hour with brake problems and Weigel's Porsche also had clutch problems. Although the BMW had retired with a broken engine there were also cracks in the Capri team too – Mass/Stuck stopped on the Mulsanne Straight with a broken conrod and Glemser's car needed a differential change.

In the early morning, Bonnier (after being again delayed) was running very fast and had got his Lola back up to eighth. Then at 8:25 am, he came up to the Filipinetti Ferrari GTB4 of Florian Vetsch on the straight with 2 slight kinks in it between Mulsanne and Indianapolis, with thick forest on either side. The Ferrari kept its line and, deciding to force an overtake before the curve, his Lola hit the Ferrari at speed and flew 100 metres over the barriers into the trees. Fellow driver Vic Elford described Bonnier's Lola as "spinning to the air like a helicopter". Critically injured, Jo Bonnier died soon afterward. He was a veteran of 13 Le Mans and chairman of the Grand Prix Drivers' Association. Vic Elford, coming upon Vetsch's car on fire, immediately stopped to rescue the driver who had already escaped with burned hands. By coincidence it was right beside a broadcasting television camera. Shaken by the accident, Elford then pulled into the pits to be substituted by Marko, only for them to retire soon after when the replacement clutch packed up. Ninety minutes later the Alfa of Stommelen/Galli also retired with a broken differential, leaving the last Alfa Romeo running in fourth.

It started raining again at 10:30 am. The Weigel 907 hit the barrier at the Dunlop Curve while running 7th. Cevert and Ganley lost time in the pits fixing wet electrics. Then just before noon, as the rain got heavier, Ganley was going slowly down the Mulsanne Straight when he was hit from behind by the Corvette of Marie-Claude Beaumont. He made it to the pits to get the rear-end repaired (taking nine minutes), but the Corvette was too badly damaged to continue. This allowed the Pescarolo/Hill car to build a secure lead over Cevert/Ganley and Jabouille/Hobbs, with the Joest Porsche well back in fourth. De Cadenet's Duckhams was doing very well in fifth until a slow brakepad change and bodywork repair dropped behind it the remaining Alfa Romeo.

=== Finish and post-race ===
The rain returned with two hours to go and created havoc. Cevert, de Adamich and Craft were on slick tyres and all aquaplaned off the track approaching the waterlogged Esses. The Duckhams had the heaviest damage and fell to 12th before getting back on the track for the final lap. As a final twist, the third-placed Jabouille/Hobbs Matra 660 was stopped by gearbox problems with less than 90 minutes remaining, and the Spanish Porsche running 8th was stopped by a wheel-bearing failure in the final minutes.

In the end, the Matra 670 of Pescarolo and Hill took the chequered flag with a comfortable margin of eleven laps over their teammates Cevert and Ganley. This was the first victory of a French car since the Rosier's Talbot-Lago victory in 1950. It also made Graham Hill the first and, to date, only driver to win the Triple Crown of the 24 Hours of Le Mans, the Indianapolis 500 and the Formula One World Championship. Although aware of the bad accident, Hill was only told of Bonnier's death after the race and was deeply affected. They were former teammates, close friends and had been the “senior statesmen” of the Formula One grid in the early 1970s.

Nine laps further back in third was the unheralded Porsche 908LH driven by Reinhold Joest, Mario Casoni and Michel Weber. It was then a close flurry for the minor places: The sole remaining Alfa Romeo, of Vaccarella and de Adamich finished just a lap ahead of the French Ferrari of Ballot-Léna/Andruet. Charles Pozzi's car was first GT home and also won the Index of Thermal Efficiency doing about 6.75 mpg. A late-race spin for the NART Ferrari cost it time to repair, finishing two laps further back. In a strong performance, five of the nine Ferraris finished, with Mike Parkes’ Filipinetti car just overhauling the Belgian car in the last hour. All the other GT manufacturers had bad races with a number of engine problems. Chevrolet, De Tomaso and Porsche only had a single finisher each. Three months after the race, Porsche unveiled its new 911 customer model: the 2.7-litre Carrera RS to even up the competition in Group 4.

The advent of the Group 2 Touring Cars was successful, with two of the Ford Capris finishing, in 10th and 11th. René Ligonnet's private entry Lola T290, coming home in 14th became the first Lola to finish at Le Mans.

== Official results ==
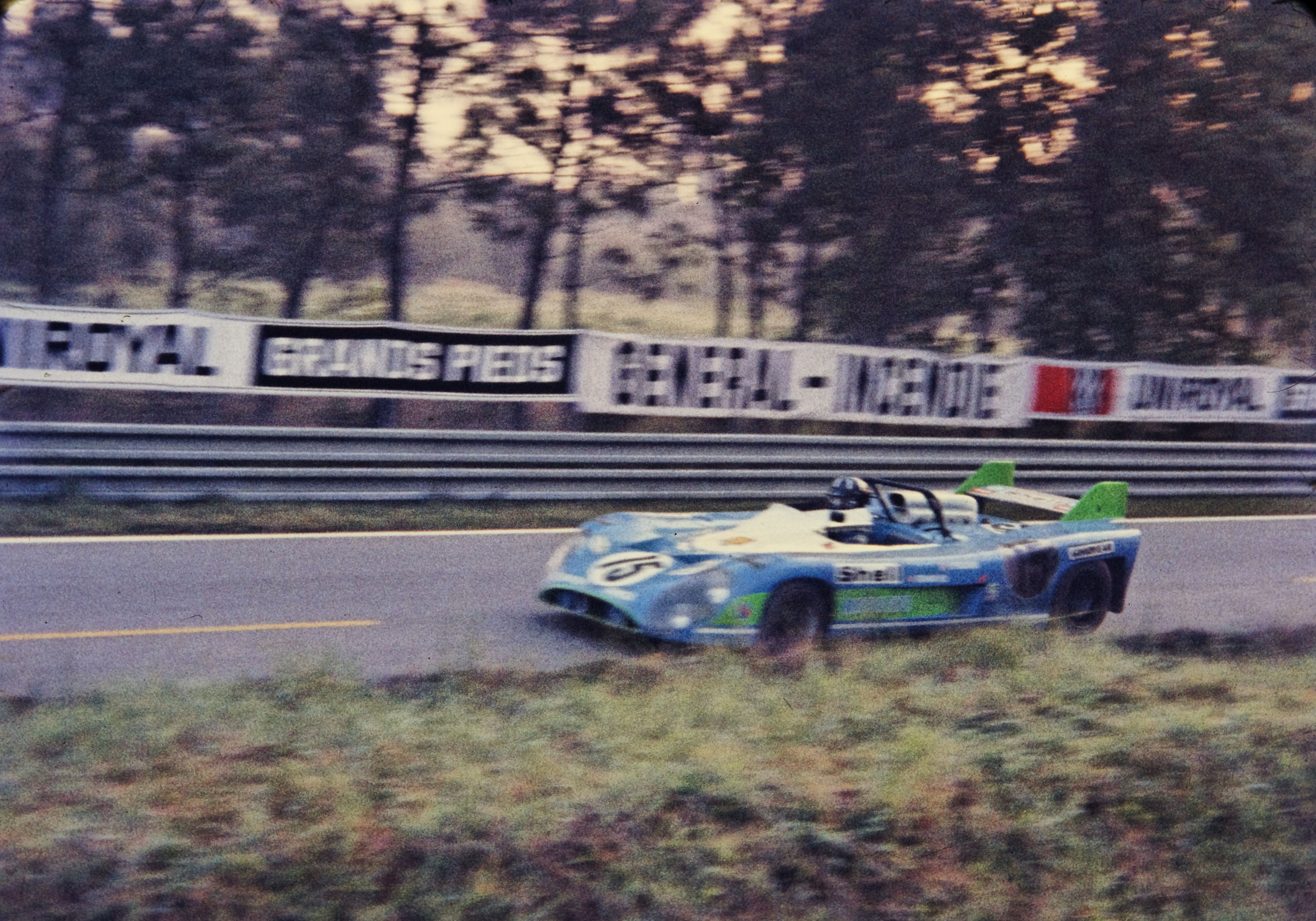
The race winning Matra-Simca MS670 which was driven by Henri Pescarolo and Graham Hill.

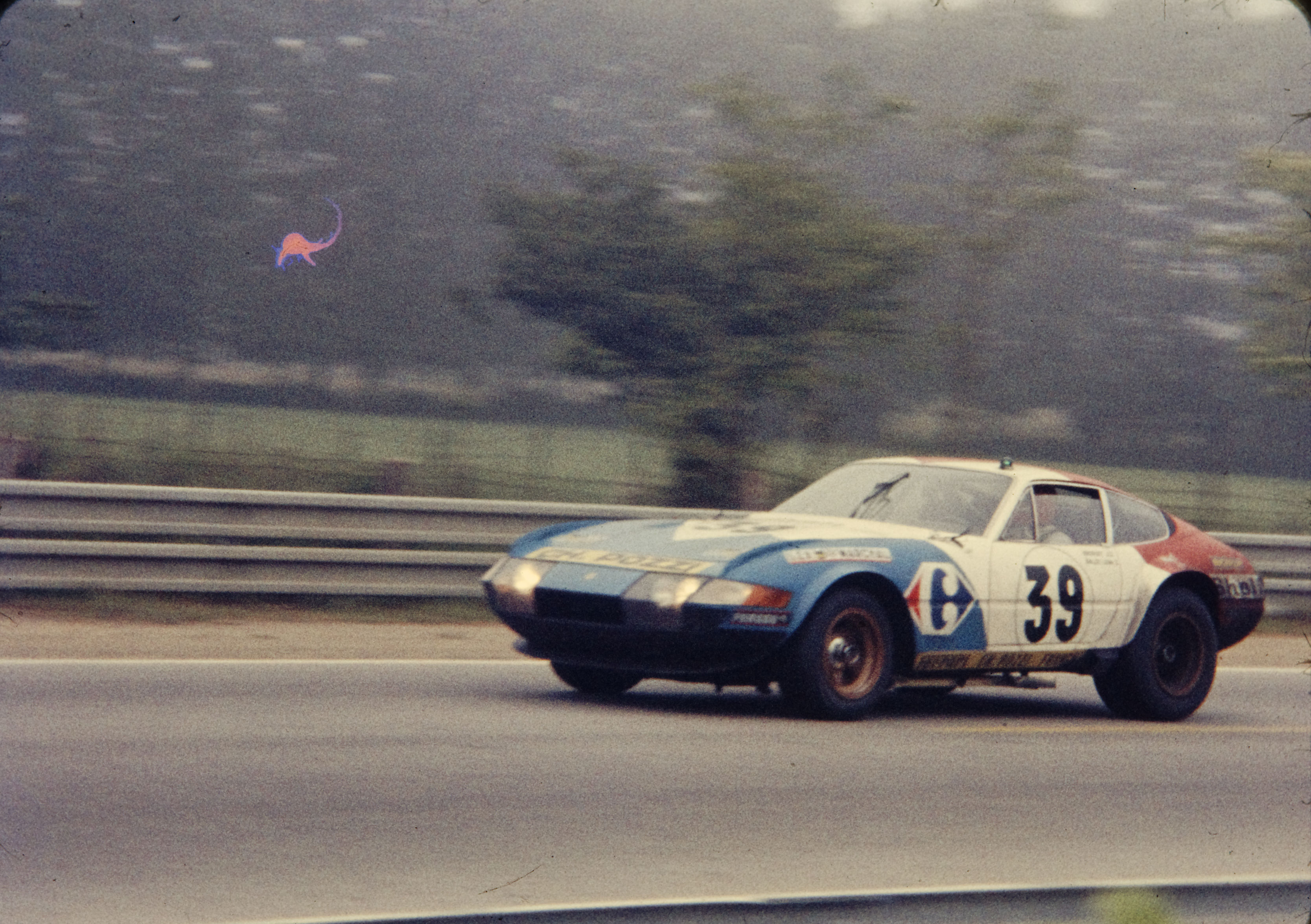
The Group 4 Special Grand Touring class-winning Ferrari 365 GTB/4 which was driven by Claude Ballot-Léna and Jean-Claude Andruet.

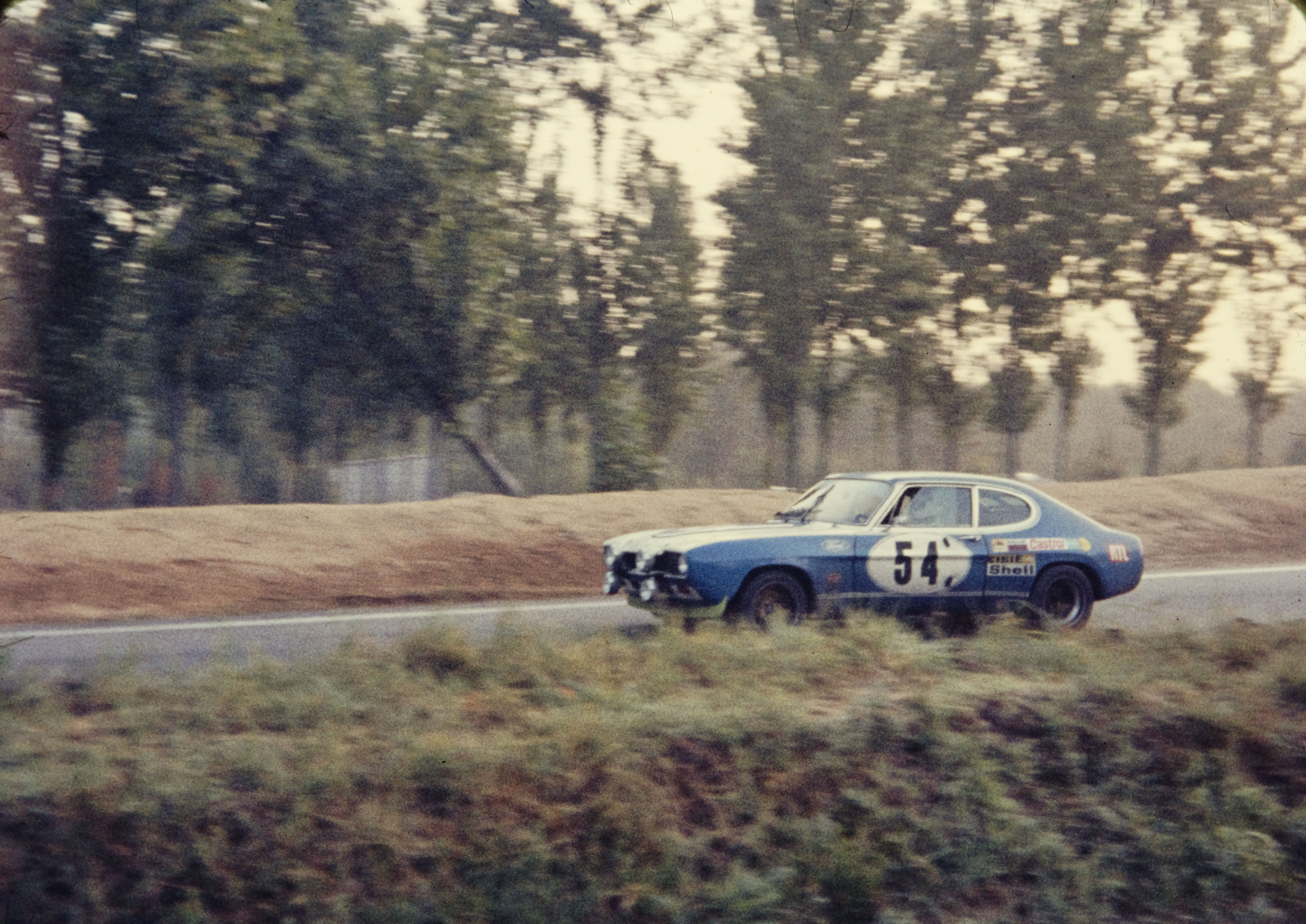
The Group 2 Special Touring class-winning Ford Capri 2600RS which was driven by Gerry Birrell and Claude Bourgoignie.

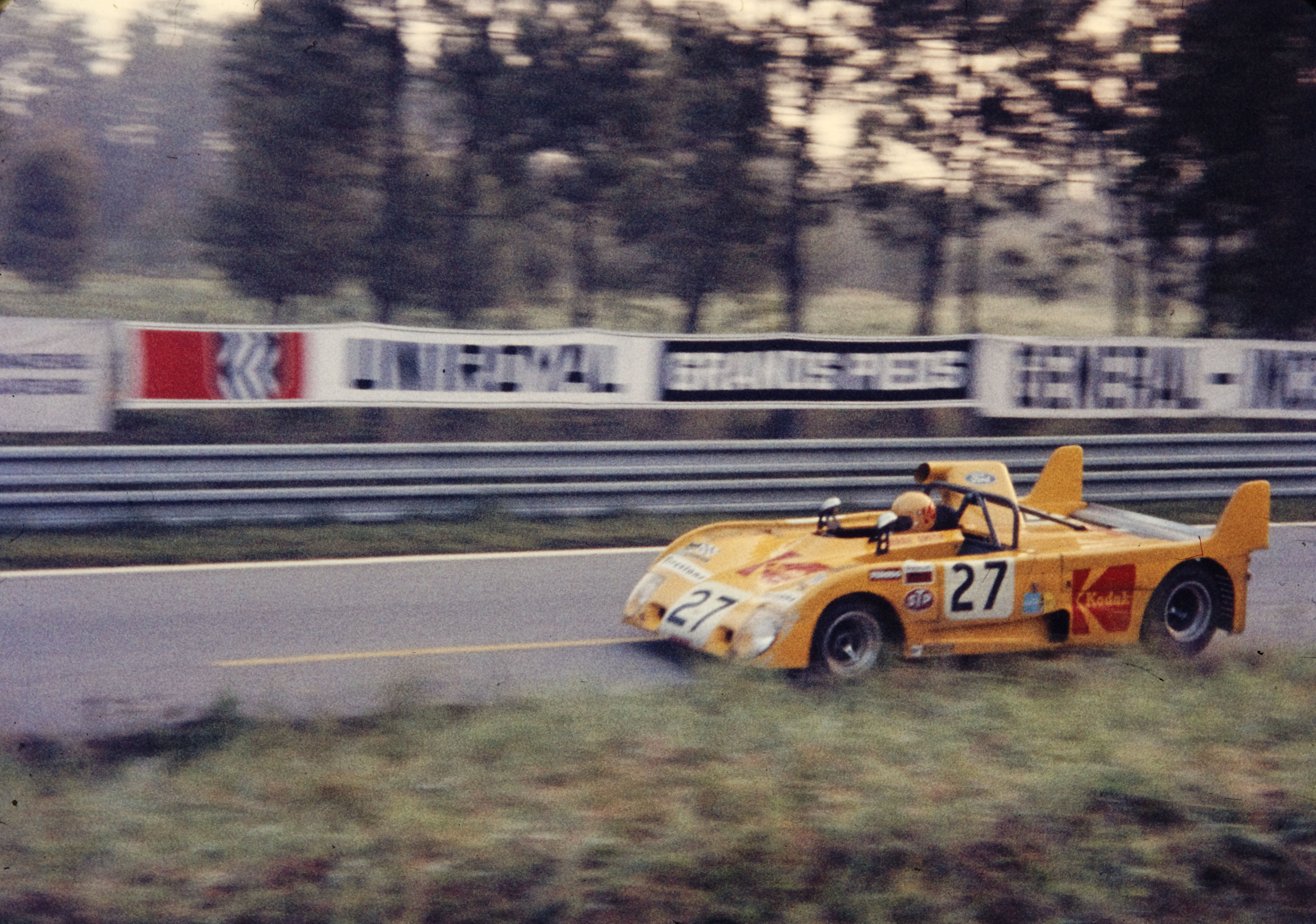
The 2 Litre Group 5 Sport Car class-winning Lola T290, driven by René Ligonnet and Barrie Smith.

=== Finishers ===
Results taken from Quentin Spurring's book, officially licensed by the ACO Class Winners are in Bold text.

Pos	Class	No.	Team	Drivers	Chassis	Engine	Tyre	Laps
1	**S** **3.0**	**15**	**(France) Equipe Matra-Simca Shell**	**(France) Henri Pescarolo** **(United Kingdom) Graham Hill**	Matra-Simca MS670	Matra 3.0L V12	G	344
2	S 3.0	14	(France) Equipe Matra-Simca Shell	(France) François Cevert (New Zealand) Howden Ganley	Matra-Simca MS670	Matra 3.0L V12	G	333
3	S 3.0	60 (reserve)	(Germany) Siffert ATE Racing	(Germany) Reinhold Joest (Germany) Michel Weber (Italy) Mario Casoni	Porsche 908LH Coupé	Porsche 3.0L F8	D	325
4	S 3.0	18	(Italy) Autodelta SpA	(Italy) Nino Vaccarella (Italy) Andrea de Adamich	Alfa Romeo Tipo 33TT3	Alfa Romeo 3.0L V8	G	307
5	**GTS**; **5.0**	**39**	**(France) Automobiles Charles Pozzi**	**(France) Claude Ballot-Léna** **(France) Jean-Claude Andruet**	Ferrari 365 GTB/4	Ferrari 4.4L V12	M	306
6	GTS; 5.0	74 (reserve)	(United States) North American Racing Team	(United States) Sam Posey (United States) Tony Adamowicz	Ferrari 365 GTB/4	Ferrari 4.4L V12	G	304
7	GTS; 5.0	34	(Switzerland) Scuderia Filipinetti	(United Kingdom) Mike Parkes (France) Jean-Louis Lafosse (Switzerland) Jean-Jacques Cochet	Ferrari 365 GTB/4	Ferrari 4.4L V12	M	302
8	GTS; 5.0	36	(Belgium) Ecurie Francorchamps	(United Kingdom) Derek Bell (Belgium) Teddy Pilette (United Kingdom) Richard Bond	Ferrari 365 GTB/4	Ferrari 4.4L V12	M	301
9	GTS; 5.0	38	(United States) North American Racing Team	(France) Jean-Pierre Jarier (France) Claude Buchet	Ferrari 365 GTB/4	Ferrari 4.4L V12	G	297
10	**TS**; **3.0**	**54**	**(Germany) Ford Motorenwerke Deutschland**	**(United Kingdom) Gerry Birrell** **(Belgium) Claude Bourgoignie**	Ford Capri 2600RS	Ford 2.9L V6	D	292
11	TS; 3.0	52	(Germany) Ford Motorenwerke Deutschland	(Germany) Dieter Glemser (Spain) Alex Soler-Roig	Ford Capri 2600RS	Ford 2.9L V6	D	289
12	S 3.0	68 (reserve)	(United Kingdom) Duckham's Oil Motor Racing (private entrant)	(United Kingdom) Alain de Cadenet (United Kingdom) Chris Craft	Duckhams LM72	Ford Cosworth DFV 3.0L V8	D	288
13	**GTS**; **2.5**	**41**	**(France) L. Meznarie** (private entrant)	**(Switzerland) Sylvain Garant** **(Germany) Jürgen Barth** **(United States) Michael Keyser**	Porsche 911S	Porsche 2492cc F6	F	285
14	**S** **2.0**	**27**	**(France) R. Ligonnet** (private entrant)	**(France) René Ligonnet** **(United Kingdom) Barrie Smith**	Lola T290	Cosworth FVC 1790cc S4	F	284
15	**GTS** **+5.0**	**4**	**(United States) North American Racing Team**	**(United States) Bob Johnson** **(United States) Dave Heinz**	Chevrolet Corvette C3	Chevrolet 7.0L V8	G	284
16	GTS +5.0	32	(Belgium) C. Dubois (private entrant)	(Belgium) Jean-Marie Jacquemin (Belgium) Yves Deprez	De Tomaso Pantera	Ford 5.8L V8	G	282
17	GTS; 2.5	46	(United States) North American Racing Team	(France) Jean-Pierre Laffeach (France) Gilles Doncieux	Dino 246 GT	Ferrari 2418cc V6	G	265
18	S 2.0	24	(Switzerland) Wicky Racing Team	(Switzerland) Peter Mattli (Switzerland) Hervé Bayard (Switzerland) Walter Brun	Porsche 907	Porsche 1997cc F6	F	252
n/c *	S 3.0	67 (reserve)	(France) C. Poirot (private entrant)	(France) Christian Poirot (France) Philippe Farjon	Porsche 908/02K	Porsche 3.0L F8	D	206

- 'Note *: Not Classified because insufficient distance covered.

=== Did Not Finish ===
Pos	Class	No	Team	Drivers	Chassis	Engine	Tyre	Laps	Reason
DNF	S 3.0	16	(France) Equipe Matra-Simca Shell	(France) Jean-Pierre Jabouille (United Kingdom) David Hobbs	Matra-Simca MS660C	Matra 3.0L V12	**G**	278 or 313	Transmission (24hr)
DNF	S 3.0	5	(Spain) Escuderia Montjuïch	(Spain) Juan Fernandez (Spain) Francesco Torredemer (Spain) Eugenio Baturone	Porsche 908/03	Porsche 3.0L F8	**G**	278	Accident (24hr)
DNF	S 3.0	19	(Italy) Autodelta SpA	(Germany) Rolf Stommelen (Italy) Giovanni ‘Nanni’ Galli	Alfa Romeo Tipo 33TT3	Alfa Romeo 3.0L V8	**G**	263	Transmission (19hr)
DNF	S 3.0	6	(Germany) H.-D. Weigel (private entrant)	(Germany) Hans-Dieter Weigel (Germany) Helmuth Krause	Porsche 908/02K	Porsche 3.0L F8	**F**	244	Accident (20hr)
DNF	GTS +5.0	29	(France) Greder Racing	(France) Henri Greder (France) Marie-Claude Beaumont	Chevrolet Corvette C3	Chevrolet 7.0L V8	**M**	235	Accident (21hr)
DNF	S 3.0	17	(Italy) Autodelta SpA	(United Kingdom) Vic Elford (Austria) Dr. Helmut Marko	Alfa Romeo Tipo 33TT3	Alfa Romeo 3.0L V8	**G**	232	Transmission (19hr)
DNF	GTS; 5.0	57 (reserve)	(United States) North American Racing Team	(United States) Masten Gregory (United States) Luigi Chinetti Jr	Ferrari 365 GTB/4	Ferrari 4.4L V12	**G**	226	Engine (20hr)
DNF	S 3.0	8	(Switzerland) Ecurie Bonnier	(Sweden) Jo Bonnier (Netherlands) Gijs van Lennep	Lola T280	Cosworth DFV 3.0L V8	**G**	213	Fatal Accident (18hr)
DNF	GTS; 2.5	42	(Switzerland) C. Haldi (private entrant)	(Switzerland) Claude Haldi (Switzerland) Paul Keller (France) "Gédéhem" (Gérard Dantan-Merlin)	Porsche 911S	Porsche 2492cc F6	**D**	208	Engine (18hr)
DNF	GTS; 5.0	35	(Switzerland) Scuderia Filipinetti	(Switzerland) Bernard Cheneviére (Switzerland) Florian Vetsch (Switzerland) Gérard Pillon	Ferrari 365 GTB/4	Ferrari 4.4L V12	**M**	204	Accident (18hr)
DNF	S 3.0	22	(France) Automobiles Ligier	(France) Jacques Laffite (France) Pierre Maublanc	Ligier JS2	Maserati 3.0L V6	**M**	195	Engine (24hr)
DNF	GTS +5.0	71 (reserve)	(France) Écurie Léopard	(France) Jean-Claude Aubriet (France) "Dépnic" (Jean-Claude Depince)	Chevrolet Corvette C3	Chevrolet 7.0L V8	**M**	188	Engine (19hr)
DNF	S 3.0	65 (reserve)	(France) "Novestille" (private entrant)	(France) Louis Cosson (France) Jean-Louis Ravenel	Porsche 910	Porsche 2379cc F6	**D**	188	Wheel bearing (16hr)
DNF	S 3.0	56 (reserve)	(France) C. Laurent (private entrant)	(France) Claude Laurent (France) Martial Delalande (France) Jacques Marché	Ligier JS2	Maserati 3.0L V6	**M**	186	Engine (19hr)
DNF	GTS; 2.5	45	(France) R. Touroul (private entrant)	(Greece) "Lee Banner" (Fernand Saropoulos) (France) Dominique Bardini	Porsche 911S	Porsche 2492cc F6	**D**	183	Engine (16hr)
DNF	TS; 3.0	53	(Germany) Ford Motorenwerke Deutschland	(Germany) Jochen Mass (Germany) Hans-Joachim Stuck	Ford Capri 2600RS	Ford 2.9L V6	**D**	152	Oil pump (14hr)
DNF	S 3.0	7	(Switzerland) Ecurie Bonnier	(Belgium) Baron Hughes de Fierlandt (France) Gérard Larrousse	Lola T280	Cosworth DFV 3.0L V8	**G**	86or 28or 26	Transmission (7hr)
DNF	S 3.0	76 (reserve)	(France) J. Egreteaud (private entrant)	(France) Jean-Claude Lagniez (France) Raymond Touroul	Porsche 908/02K	Porsche 3.0L F8	**D**	83	Out of fuel (8hr)
DNF	GTS +5.0	72 (reserve)	(United States) John Greenwood Racing	(France) Alain Cudini (France) Bernard Darniche (United States) John Greenwood	Chevrolet Corvette C3	Chevrolet 7.0L V8	**BF**	82	Engine (9hr)
DNF	S 2.0	23	(United Kingdom) G.Edwards (private entrant)	(United Kingdom) Brian Robinson (France) Jean Rondeau	Chevron B21	Cosworth FVC 1790cc S4	**F**	76	Engine (10hr)
DNF	GTS; 5.0	37	(United Kingdom) Maranello Concessionaires	(United Kingdom) Peter Westbury (United Kingdom) John Hine	Ferrari 365 GTB/4	Ferrari 4.4L V12	**M**	72	Engine (9hr)
DNF	TS; 3.0	49	(Germany) Team Schnitzer-Motul	(Germany) Hans Heyer (Switzerland) René Herzog	BMW 2800 CS	BMW 3.0L S6	**D**	70	Engine (7hr)
DNF	GTS; 2.5	44	(France) J. Sage (private entrant) (Germany) Gelo Racing Team	(France) Jean Sage (Germany) Georg Loos (Germany) Franz Pesch	Porsche 911S	Porsche 2492cc F6	**D**	64	Engine (8hr)
DNF	GTS +5.0	28	(United States) John Greenwood Racing	(United States) John Greenwood (United States) Dick Smothers	Chevrolet Corvette C3	Chevrolet 7.0L V8	**BF**	53	Engine (10hr)
DNF	GTS; 2.5	80 (reserve)	(Germany) Porsche-Kremer Racing Team	(Germany) Erwin Kremer (United Kingdom) John Fitzpatrick	Porsche 911S	Porsche 2492cc F6	**D**	39	Engine (5hr)
DNF	GTS; 2.5	79 (reserve)	(Belgium) J.-P. Gaban (private entrant)	(Belgium) Hermes Delbar (Belgium) Roger van der Schrick	Porsche 911S	Porsche 2450cc F6	**D**	36	Transmission (4hr)
DNF	GTS +5.0	30	(Spain) Escuderia Montjuïch	(Spain) José Juncadella (Spain) Fernando de Baviera	De Tomaso Pantera	Ford 5.8L V8	**G**	36	Engine (9hr)
DNF	GTS +5.0	31	(Spain) Escuderia Montjuïch	(Switzerland) Herbert Müller (Switzerland) Cox Kocher	De Tomaso Pantera	Ford 5.8L V8	**G**	36or 31	Engine (10hr)
DNF	S 2.0	69 (reserve)	(Switzerland) M. Dupont (private entrant)	(Switzerland) Michel Dupont (France) Jean-Paul Bodin (Switzerland) Paul Blancpain	Chevron B19/21	Cosworth FVC 1790cc S4	**F**	29	Transmission (5hr)
DNF	GTS; 2.5	40	(France) R. Mazzia (private entrant)	(France) Pierre Mauroy (France) Marcel Mignot	Porsche 911S	Porsche 2492cc F6	**D**	27	Engine (4hr)
DNF	TS; 3.0	84 (reserve)	(France) Shark Team (private entrant)	(France) Jean-Claude Guérie (France) Jean-Pierre Rouget (France) Cyril Grandet	Ford Capri 2600RS	Ford 2.9L V6	**D**	26	Engine (4hr)
DNF	GTS; 5.0	75 (reserve)	(France) Automobiles Charles Pozzi	(France) François Migault (France) Daniel Rouveyran (France) Jean-Claude Andruet	Ferrari 365 GTB/4	Ferrari 4.4L V12	**M**	22	Transmission (9hr)
DNF	S 3.0	58 (reserve)	(Austria) Bosch Racing Team	(Austria) Walter Roser (Austria) Otto Stuppacher	Porsche 908/02K	Porsche 3.0L F8	**F**/ **D**	11	Accident (2hr)
DNF	S 3.0	21	(France) Automobiles Ligier	(France) Guy Ligier (France) Jean-François Piot	Ligier JS2	Maserati 3.0L V6	**M**	7	Engine (3hr)
DNF	S +3.0	33	(France) Société Franco-Brittanic	(France) Guy Chasseuil (France) Jean Vinatier	De Tomaso Pantera	Ford 5.8L V8	**G**	3	Engine (2hr)
DNF	S 3.0	12	(France) Equipe Matra-Simca Shell	(France) Jean-Pierre Beltoise (New Zealand) Chris Amon	Matra-Simca MS670	Matra 3.0L V12	**G**	1	Engine (2hr)

=== Did Not Start ===
Pos	Class	No	Team	Drivers	Chassis	Engine	Tyre	Reason
DNS	S 2.0	26	(France) Veglia GRAC Racing	(Monaco) Lionel Noghès (France) “Cyprien” (Christian Mons) (France) Alain Finkelstein	GRAC MT16	Cosworth FVC 1825cc S4	F	Practice Accident
DNS	GTS; 2.5	43	(France) J. Mesange (private entrant)	(France) Jean Mesange (Switzerland) Paul Keller	Porsche 911S	Porsche 2492cc F6	D	Did not start
DNS	S 3.0	61 (reserve)	(Switzerland) Wicky Racing Team	(Switzerland) André Wicky (Switzerland) Walter Brun (Morocco) Max Cohen-Olivar	Porsche 908/02K	Porsche 3.0L F8		Mechanical issues
DNS	GTS; 2.5	78 (reserve)	(France) Gelo Racing Team	(France) Jean Sage (Germany) Georg Loos (Switzerland) Pierre Greub	Porsche 911S	Porsche 2492cc F6	F	Did not start
DNQ	TS; 3.0	47	(France) Motor Racing Facilities (private entrant)	(United Kingdom) Robert Grant (Republic of Ireland) Martin Birrane (Belgium) Serge Trosch	Datsun 240Z	Datsun 2394cc F6	D	Did not qualify
DNQ	GTS; 2.5	51	(Switzerland) Wicky Racing Team	(Switzerland) Jean-Pierre Aeschlimann (Spain) Juan Diez	Porsche 911S	Porsche 2480cc F6	F	Did not qualify
DNQ	TS; 2.5	55	(France) AGACI	(France) Guy Verrier (France) Gérard Foucault (France) François Monath	Citroën SM	Maserati 2.9L V6	M	Did not qualify
DNQ	S 3.0	64 (reserve)	(Switzerland) Scuderia Filipinetti	(Switzerland) Dominique Martin (Switzerland) Jean-Jacques Cochet (Switzerland) Gérard Pillon	Lola T280	Cosworth DFV 3.0L V8		Did not qualify
DNQ	GTS +5.0	73 (reserve)	(Italy) Scuderia Brescia Corse	(Italy) Gianpiero Moretti (Italy) Enrico Pasolini (Italy) “Pooky” (Vincenzo Cazzago)	De Tomaso Pantera	Ford 5.8L V8	G	Did not qualify
DNQ	TS; 3.0	82 (reserve)	(France) C. Buchet (private entrant)	(France) Claude Buchet (France) Joël Bonnemaison	Ford Capri 2600RS	Ford 2.9L V6		Did not qualify
DNQ	S 2.0	85 (reserve)	(France) Société Darnval	(France) Jean-Daniel Jakubowski (Switzerland) Peter Schweitzer	Taydec Mk3	Cosworth FVC 1790cc S4	F	Did not qualify

=== Class Winners ===
Class	Sports Winners		Class	Special GT Winners		Class	Special Touring Winners	
Sports			GTS >5000	#4 Chevrolet Corvette C3	Johnson / Heinz *	TS		
Sports 3000	#15 Matra-Simca MS670	Pescarolo / Hill *	GTS 5000	#39 Ferrari 365 GTB/4	Ballot-Léna / Andruet *	Special Touring	#54 Ford Capri 2600RS	Birrell / Bourgoignie *
Sports 2000	#27 Lola T290	Ligonnet / Smith *	GTS 2500	#41 Porsche 911 S	Garant / Barth / Keyser *	TS		

- Note: setting a new class distance record.

=== Index of Thermal Efficiency ===
For Group 2 and Group 4 cars.

Pos	Class	No	Team	Drivers	Chassis	Score
1	GTS; 5.0	39	(France) Automobiles Charles Pozzi	(France) Claude Ballot-Léna (France) Jean-Claude Andruet	Ferrari 365 GTB/4	1.05
2	GTS; 5.0	36	(Belgium) Ecurie Francorchamps	(United Kingdom) Derek Bell (Belgium) Teddy Pilette (United Kingdom) Richard Bond	Ferrari 365 GTB/4	0.95
3	GTS; 5.0	74 (reserve)	(United States) North American Racing Team	(United States) Sam Posey (United States) Tony Adamowicz	Ferrari 365 GTB/4	0.93
4	GTS; 5.0	34	(Switzerland) Scuderia Filipinetti	(United Kingdom) Mike Parkes (France) Jean-Louis Lafosse (Switzerland) Jean-Jacques Cochet	Ferrari 365 GTB/4	0.91
5	GTS; 5.0	38	(United States) North American Racing Team	(France) Jean-Pierre Jarier (France) Claude Buchet	Ferrari 365 GTB/4	0.89
6	GTS; 2.5	41	(France) L. Meznarie (private entrant)	(Switzerland) Sylvain Garant (Germany) Jürgen Barth (United States) Michael Keyser	Porsche 911S	0.85
7	GTS; 3.0	46	(United States) North American Racing Team	(France) Jean-Pierre Laffeach (France) Gilles Doncieux	Dino 246 GT	0.84
8	TS; 3.0	54	(Germany) Ford Motorenwerke Deutschland	(United Kingdom) Gerry Birrell (Belgium) Claude Bourgoignie	Ford Capri 2600RS	0.81
9=	GTS +5.0	32	(Belgium) C. Dubois (private entrant)	(France) Jean-Marie Jacquemin (Belgium) Yves Deprez	De Tomaso Pantera	0.78
9=	TS; 3.0	52	(Germany) Ford Motorenwerke Deutschland	(Germany) Dieter Glemser (Spain) Alex Soler-Roig	Ford Capri 2600RS	0.78
9=	GTS +5.0	4	(United States) North American Racing Team	(United States) Bob Johnson (United States) Dave Heinz	Chevrolet Corvette C3	0.78

=== Statistics ===
Taken from Quentin Spurring's book, officially licensed by the ACO

- Fastest Lap in practice –F.Cevert, #14 Matra-Simca MS670 – 3:42.2secs; 220.99 km/h (137.32 mph)
- Fastest Lap – G. van Lennep, #8 Lola T280 – 3:46.9secs; 216.41 km/h (134.47 mph)
- Winning Distance – 4,691.34 km (2,915.06 mi)
- Winner's Average Speed – 195.46 km/h (121.45 mph)
- Attendance – ?

=== International Championship for Makes Standings ===
As calculated after Le Mans, Round 9 of 11

Pos	Manufacturer	Points
1	(Italy) Ferrari	160 (168)*
2	(Italy) Alfa Romeo	85
3	(West Germany) Porsche	58 (60)*
4	(United Kingdom) Lola	44
5	(United Kingdom) Chevron	37
6=	(United Kingdom) Mirage	20
6=	(France) Matra	20
8	(United States) Chevrolet	13
9	(Italy) De Tomaso	12
10	(Italy) Abarth	4

- Note: Only the best 8 of 11 results counted to the final Championship points. The full total earned to date is given in brackets

Citations
