= John Greenwood (racing driver) =

John Greenwood (April 5, 1945 – July 7, 2015) was an American race car driver, entrepreneur and automotive performance car builder and engineer.

== 24 Hours of Le Mans ==
Greenwood raced three times at the 24 Hours of Le Mans - 1972 24 Hours of Le Mans, 1973 24 Hours of Le Mans, and 1976 24 Hours of Le Mans.

== Trans-Am Series ==
Greenwood won the title for the 1975 Trans-Am season.

== IMSA GT Championship ==
Greenwood won the pole position for the 1975 24 Hours of Daytona.

== John Greenwood Racing ==
With Greenwood Corvettes, he built many successful race cars.

== Racing results ==
=== 24 Hours of Le Mans results ===
Year	Team	Co-Driver(s)	Car	Class	Laps	Pos.	Class Pos.
1972	(United States) John Greenwood Racing	(United States) Dick Smothers	Chevrolet Corvette C3	GTS +5.0	53	DNF	DNF
1972	(United States) John Greenwood Racing	(France) Alain Cudini (France) Bernard Darniche	Chevrolet Corvette C3	GTS +5.0	82	DNF	DNF
1973	(United States) John Greenwood Racing	(United States) Bob Johnson	Chevrolet Corvette C3	GTS +5.0	37	DNF	DNF
1976	(United States) IMSA (United States) Greenwood Corvettes	(France) Bernard Darniche	Chevrolet Corvette Stingray	IMSA GT	29	DNF	DNF
