= Toine Hezemans =

Dutch racing driver (born 1943)

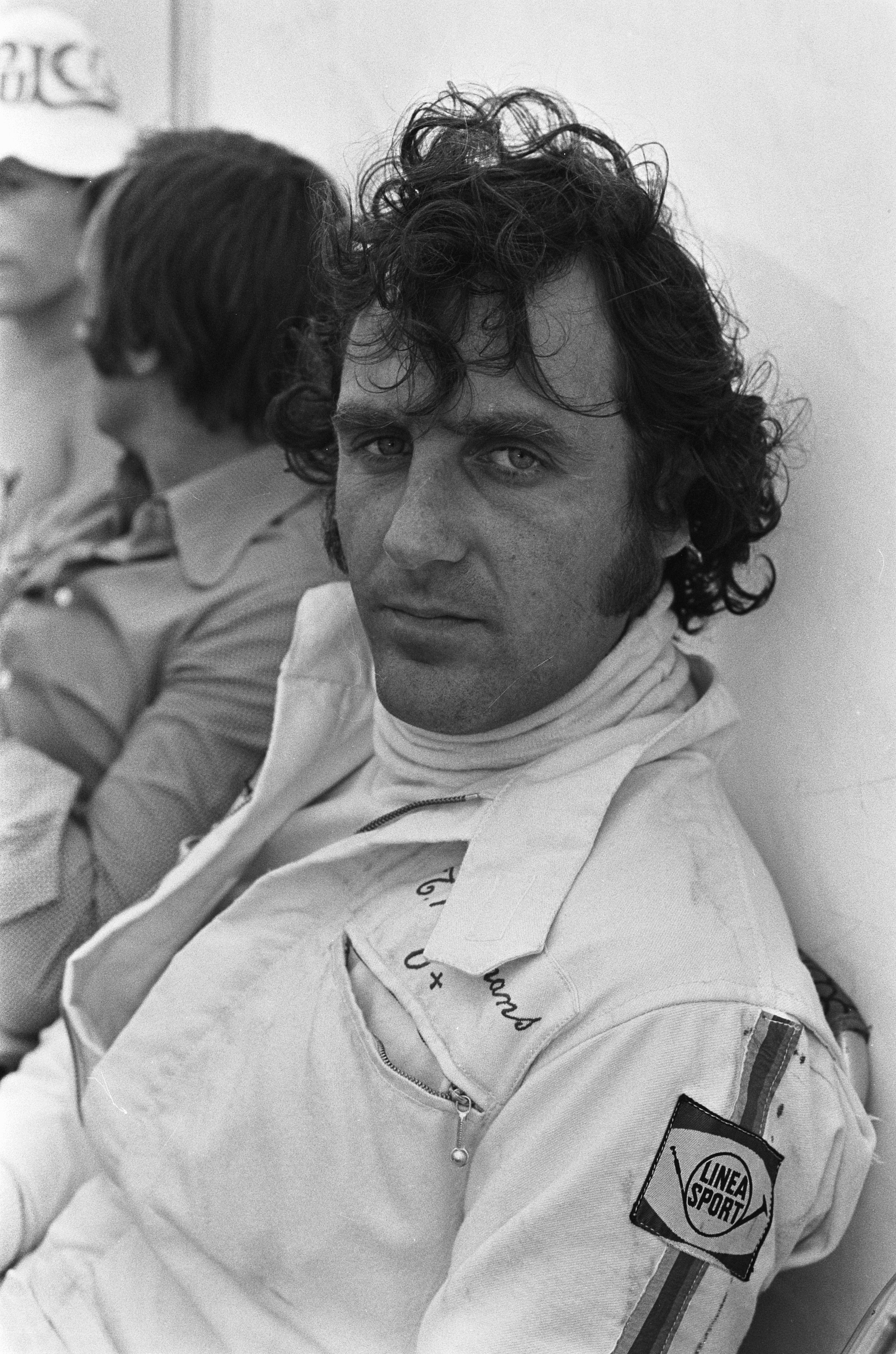
- Hezemans at the Circuit Zandvoort in 1973
- Born: Antoine Emile Hezemans; April 15, 1943 (age 83) Eindhoven, Netherlands
- Children: Mike; Loris; Liam

Antoine Emile Hezemans (born 15 April 1943, in Eindhoven) is a Dutch former touring and prototype racing car driver in the 1960s and 1970s. After retiring from racing, Hezemans started manufacturing karting engines. He developed the Rotax 100 cc engines into a World championship winner in his new factory at Eindhoven Airport in the Netherlands. His Rotax engines won ten times the world championships in various classes and wiped out the Italian karting competition. He sold his company Bombardier Rotax Holland b.v. back to Bombardier in Canada in 1996. In 2000, he started his own team with Dodge Vipers and won numerous races in the Gt 1 Championship. He made a deal with GM in the US and got hold of two Corvettes C6 and was successful privateer Team, winning 2 times the 24 hours of Spa. One of the drivers was his son, Mike Hezemans. Even today, he has a European NASCAR team where his sons Loris Hezemans and Liam Hezemans won the European NASCAR championships three times. Since 1978, he is very active in real estate projects in Miami, Brussels and Amsterdam.

Hezemans won the European Touring Car Championship in 1970 with Alfa Romeo GTAm and in 1973 with BMW 3.0 CSL and in 1975 the Euro GT class with Porsche 934. In the 1970s Hezemans drove also Alfa Romeo Tipo 33 prototype racers, winning the 1971 Targa Florio with Nino Vaccarella in an Alfa Romeo 33/3.

In 2022, Team Hezeberg joined the NASCAR Cup Series, fielding a Ford Mustang. Team Hezeberg was a partnership between Hezemans and Ernest Berg. Jacques Villeneuve did the first race for the team and after that Loris Hezemans drove five races. Daniil Kvyat was added to the roster by fielding a Toyota Camry. Due to training limitations, Team Hezeberg stopped at the end of 2022 season.

Toine has three sons: Mike Hezemans, Loris Hezemans and Liam Hezemans and daughter Davy.

== Wins ==
- Winner of the European Touring Car Championship 1970 and 1973
- Winner of the Targa Florio 1971
- Winner of the Spa 24 Hours 1973
- Winner of the 24 Hours of Le Mans in the TS category 1973 and GTS category in 1975
- Winner of the European GT Championship 1976
- Winner of the 24 Hours of Daytona 1978
- Winner of the 6 Hours of Watkins Glen 1978

== 24 Hours of Le Mans results ==
Year	Team	Co-Driver(s)	Car	Class	Laps	Pos	Class Pos
1970	(Italy) Autodelta SpA	(United States) Masten Gregory	Alfa Romeo T33/3	P 3.0	5	DNF	DNF
1973	(Germany) BMW Motorsport	(Austria) Dieter Quester	BMW 3.0 CSL	TS 5.0	307	11th	1st
1975	(Germany) Gelo Racing Team	(Netherlands) Gijs van Lennep	Porsche 911 Carrera RSR	GTS	316	5th	1st
1975	(Germany) Gelo Racing Team	(United Kingdom) John Fitzpatrick	Porsche 911 Carrera RSR	GTS	316	5th	1st
1975	(Germany) Gelo Racing Team	(Liechtenstein) Manfred Schurti	Porsche 911 Carrera RSR	GTS	316	5th	1st
1976	(Germany) Gelo Racing Team	(Australia) Tim Schenken	Porsche 934	Gp.4 GT	277	16th	2nd
1977	(Germany) Gelo Racing Team	(Australia) Tim Schenken	Porsche 935	Gr. 5	269	DNF	DNF
1977	(Germany) Gelo Racing Team	(Germany) Hans Heyer	Porsche 935	Gr. 5	269	DNF	DNF
1978	(Germany) Weisberg Gelo Team	(United Kingdom) John Fitzpatrick	Porsche 935/77	Gr.5 +2.0	19	DNF	DNF
