= Dieter Glemser =

German racing driver (1938–2026)

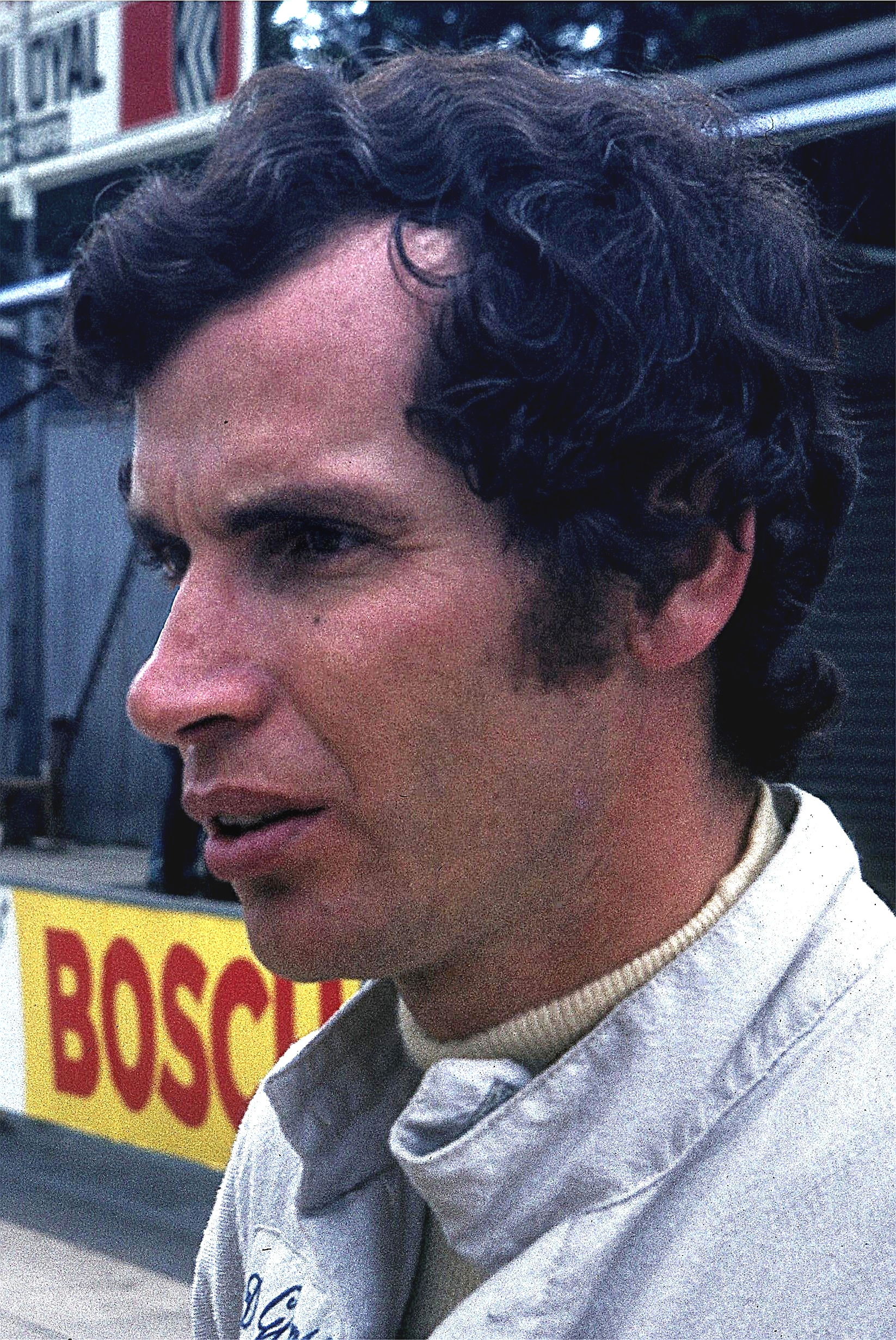
- Glemser in 1972
- Nationality: German
- Born: 28 June 1938
- Died: 10 June 2026 (aged 87)

Dieter Glemser (28 June 1938 – 10 June 2026) was a German touring car racing driver from Stuttgart. He started his career in the early 1960s in rallying with a Porsche 356, and in 1963 won the Rally Poland with a Mercedes-Benz 220SE. Glemser died on 10 June 2026, at the age of 87.

== Overview ==
In circuit racing, he became very successful in the early 1970s for Ford:

- 1971 winner European Touring Car Championship
- 1971 winner 24 Hours Spa
- 1971 Guia Race at the Macau Grand Prix in a Ford Capri 2600RS
- 1972 24 Hours of Le Mans 11th overall with a Ford Capri 2600RS
- 1973 Deutsche Rennsport Meisterschaft with Zakspeed Racing Ford Escort
- 1974 Deutsche Rennsport Meisterschaft with Zakspeed Racing Ford Escort.

Glemser also drove one time in Australia, partnering then three-time and defending race winner Allan Moffat in Moffat's V8 powered Ford XB Falcon GT Hardtop in the 1974 Hardie-Ferodo 1000 at the Mount Panorama Circuit. After numerous engine and transmission troubles in practice (which saw them qualify in 15th) and again in the race, the Falcon was retired from the 163 lap race on lap 92. The Allan Moffat Racing team had gone into the race as favourites after Moffat easily won the traditional lead up event to the Bathurst 1000, the Sandown 250 just one month earlier.

| Preceded by Toine Hezemans | European Touring Car Championship champion 1971 | Succeeded by Jochen Mass |
