= Greenwood Corvettes =

Greenwood Corvettes is an American automotive performance tuning and racing company specializing in Corvette sportscars and race cars founded by automotive enthusiasts and professional race car drivers, American brothers Burt and John Greenwood.

Throughout his career as a professional race car driver and builder John Greenwood successfully piloted Chevrolet Corvettes in several significant races in the 1970s, including the 24 Hours of Le Mans (1972, 1973, 1976), the 24 Hours of Daytona (1971), and the 12 Hours of Sebring (1971).
