= Jean-Pierre Rouget =

French former racing driver (born 1941)

Jean-Pierre Rouget (born 22 February 1941) is a French former racing driver.
