= Huayra Pronello Ford =

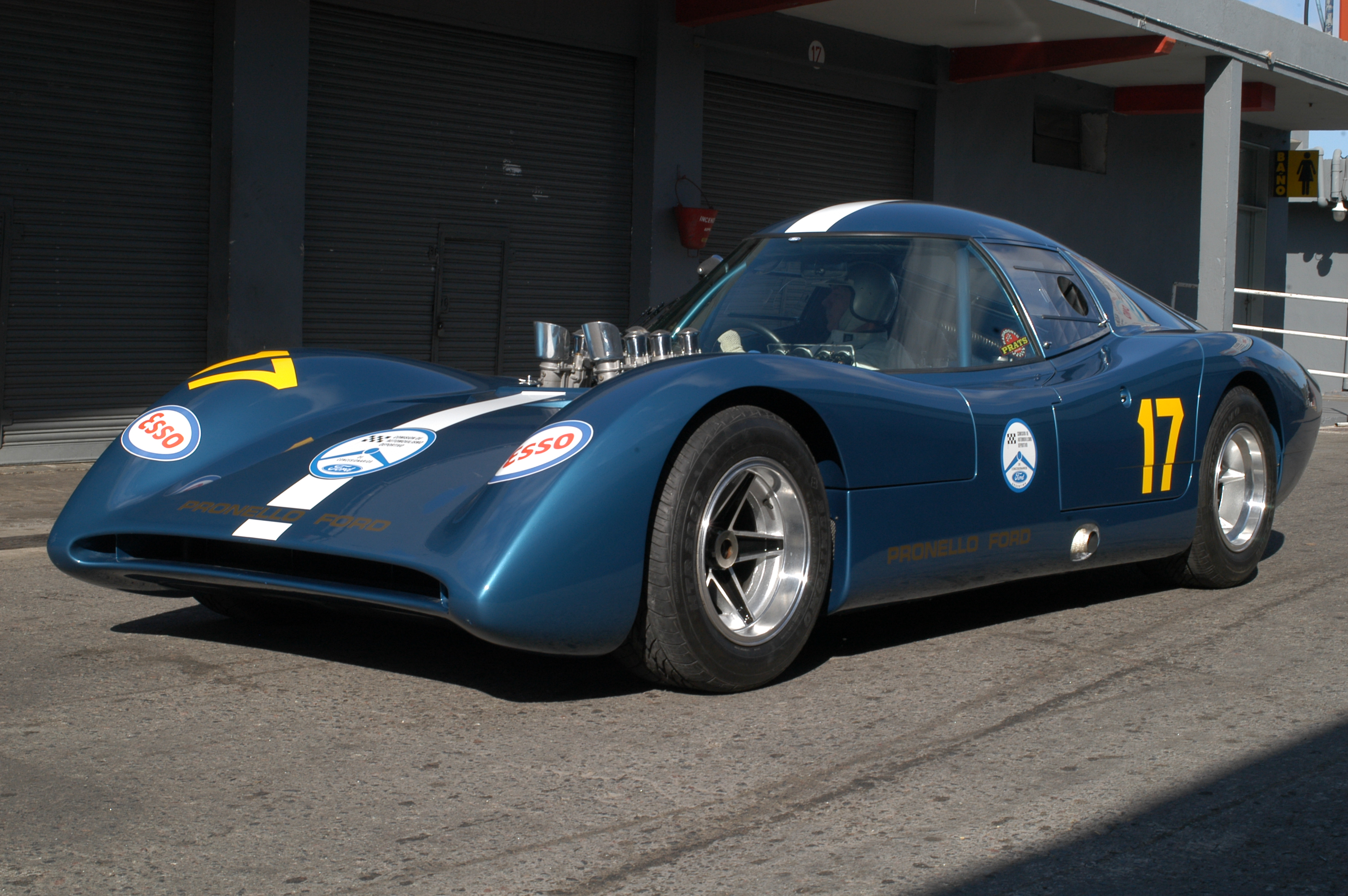

Overview
- Manufacturer: Heriberto Pronello, Ford Official Team
- Production: Villa Nueva, Córdoba, Argentina
- Model years: 1968-1970

Body and chassis
- Class: racing Sport Prototipo, CX 0.22
- Body style: Reticulado artesanal de caños.
- Related: Chevitú, Chevytres, Garrafa, Falcon F-100, Trueno Naranja, Liebre MkII Torino, Torino Crespi

Powertrain
- Engine: front engine
- Transmission: rear wheel drive

Dimensions
- Length: 4350 mm
- Width: 1880 mm
- Height: 1105 mm

Huayra Pronello Ford is an Argentine racing car built in 1969. It was designed by Heriberto Pronello for the official Ford Sports-Prototype team. The Huayra was powered by a heavily modified Ford Y-block V8, downsized to four liters, producing 430 hp, with four Weber 48/48 IDF carburetors. Driven by Carlos Pascualini and future competitive Formula One driver Carlos Reutemann, it was the fastest car in both qualifying and race in nearly all of Argentina's Turismo Carretera races in 1969.

== History ==
=== Context ===
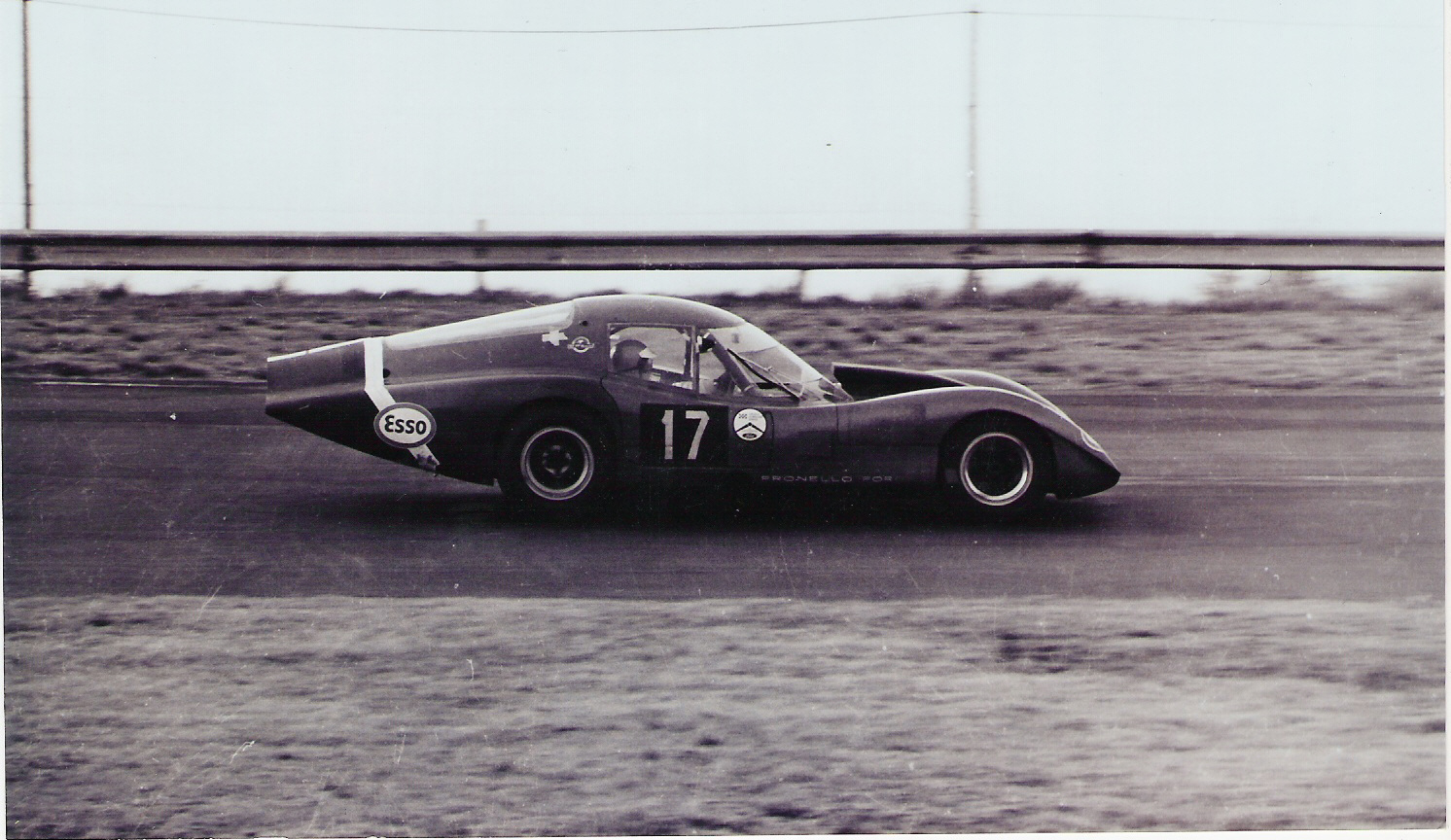
The Huayra running with the bodywork extension for high speed circuits.

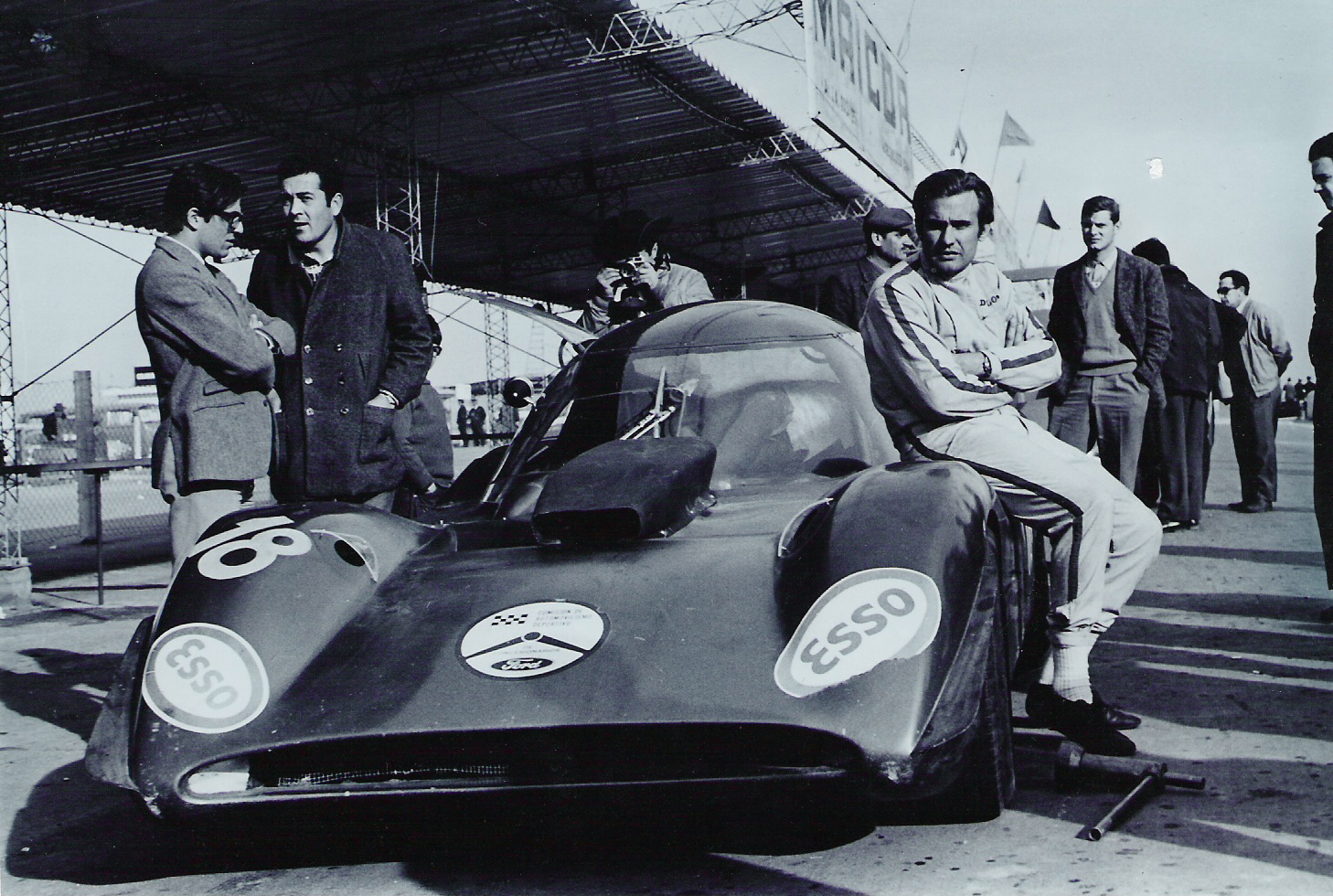
Carlos Reutemann moments before a race, sitting on a Huayra

The Argentine Turismo Carretera racing series had been dominated by Ford and Chevrolet until the end of the 1960s. In 1967, IKA introduced the Torino and set up a team to promote it. The IKA team drivers were Eduardo Copello, Héctor Gradassi and Jorge Ternengo. But in the team there were also two outstanding figures, chief mechanic Oreste Berta, and designer Heriberto Pronello. Their modified Torinos, the Liebre I (Hare I) and Liebre II, dominated the 1967 season.

In 1968, IKA officially withdrew from TC, but Pronello presented two new models, the Liebre 1 1/2 and later the Liebre III. However, the championship went to Carlos Pairetti in his Trueno Naranja Chevrolet, designed by Pedro Campo. Still, Pronello's cars were chosen by many pilots, and the series became a showcase of advanced design and technology. Moreover, due to the dangers involved in street racing, the series began to move to the tracks, and by 1969, a new, race-track only, series with its own regulations was established -the Sports-prototype.

== The Huayra ==
=== Origin of the name ===
Wayra (pronounced waɪ-rah) is the word for "wind" in the South American language of Quechua. The name was suggested to Pronello by a visual artist friend of his upon seeing the car being tested in the wind tunnel.

== Origin ==
In 1969, Heriberto Pronello signed with Ford Motor Argentina to build six cars for the make's official Sports-prototype and Turismo Carretera teams. He built two Huayra SPs, and four Halcón TCs (two of the latter would be sold to private drivers). Pronello had been designing the Huayra since 1966, but had not had a chance to develop his project. Ford would now provide the F100 V8 engines, but Pronello would have to finance the project, until one condition was met: the car had to be among the four fastests in one of the first four races of the championship. This was achieved without much difficulty.

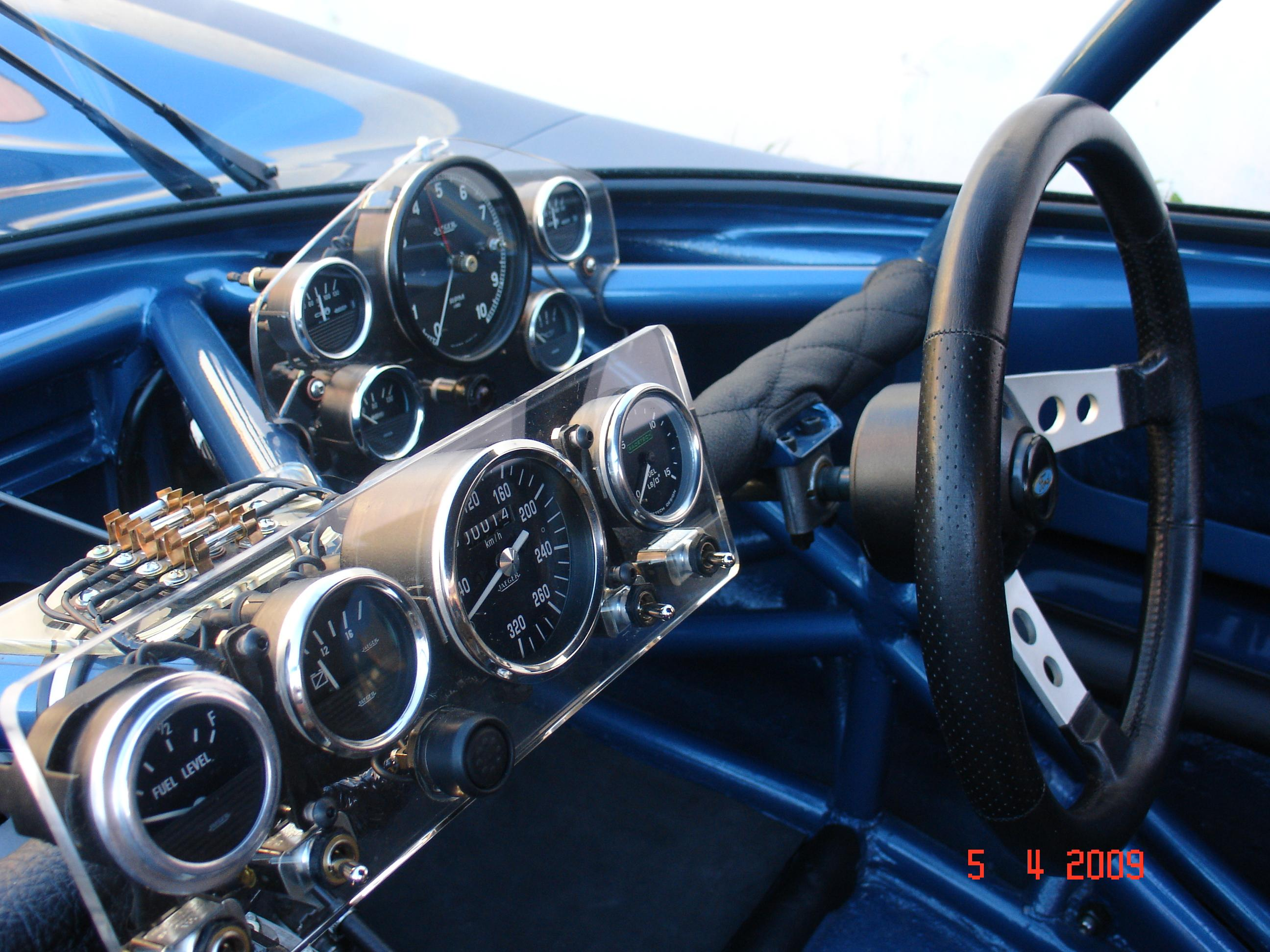
Interior of the Huayra SP

Meanwhile, the team took shape. Carlos Reutemann and Carlos Pascualini drove the SPs, while Jorge Ternengo and Reutemann or Pascualini drove the Halcón TCs. The Halcón, though very similar to the Huayra, was 19 cm longer, thinner tyres, a different chassis, and other different characteristics. In the beginning, Pronello himself tested the car on the street and on the Oscar Cabalén racetrack in Córdoba. On April 22, the car was being tested by Pascualini in Buenos Aires when it caught fire and was almost completely destroyed. Despite this, Ford continued to support Pronello.

== On the track ==
=== Huayra's first steps ===
The Huayra debuted on May 18, in Córdoba. Both Huayras qualified second, but had to abandon due to mechanical problems. The only absolute win would be on the following race, on June 22, in the Rafaela oval track. During qualifying, Reutemann averaged 231,223 km/h, with Pascualini a mere 7 tenths behind. During the race, both cars had a lap record of 1' 13" 8/10, at 225,583 km/h. Pascualini also set the year's race average for the series, an impressive 216,078 km/h. Pascualini recalls how "we took the curves at almost 300 km/h. It was the fastest race car I've ever driven. But the Huayra had an amazing grip, it was well-balanced, and the brakes and steering were faultless. That was without a doubt the most important victory of my career."

Pascualini and Pronello both recall that in those days they used to give each engine a name. Thus, there was "The Kerusha," "Lolita," and "Black Party." The Huayras were almost always the fastest cars, but it was mostly due to engine failures that they often had to abandon. In 1970, the Huayras continued to race in SP, but as spiders, since the new regulations allowed for open cars. Though the engines were more reliable, they were not as superior as the previous year's and lost protagonism. In 1971, the Huayras raced less and less as manufacturers lost interest in the series.

== The Huayra today ==
=== Restoration ===
In 1996, Ricardo Zeziola began restoring one of the Halcón-Fords. The reconstructed car was shown in various exhibitions, and was awarded the Best Restoration prize in Autoclasica 1999. Due to this restoration's repercussion, more information about the other cars began to appear.

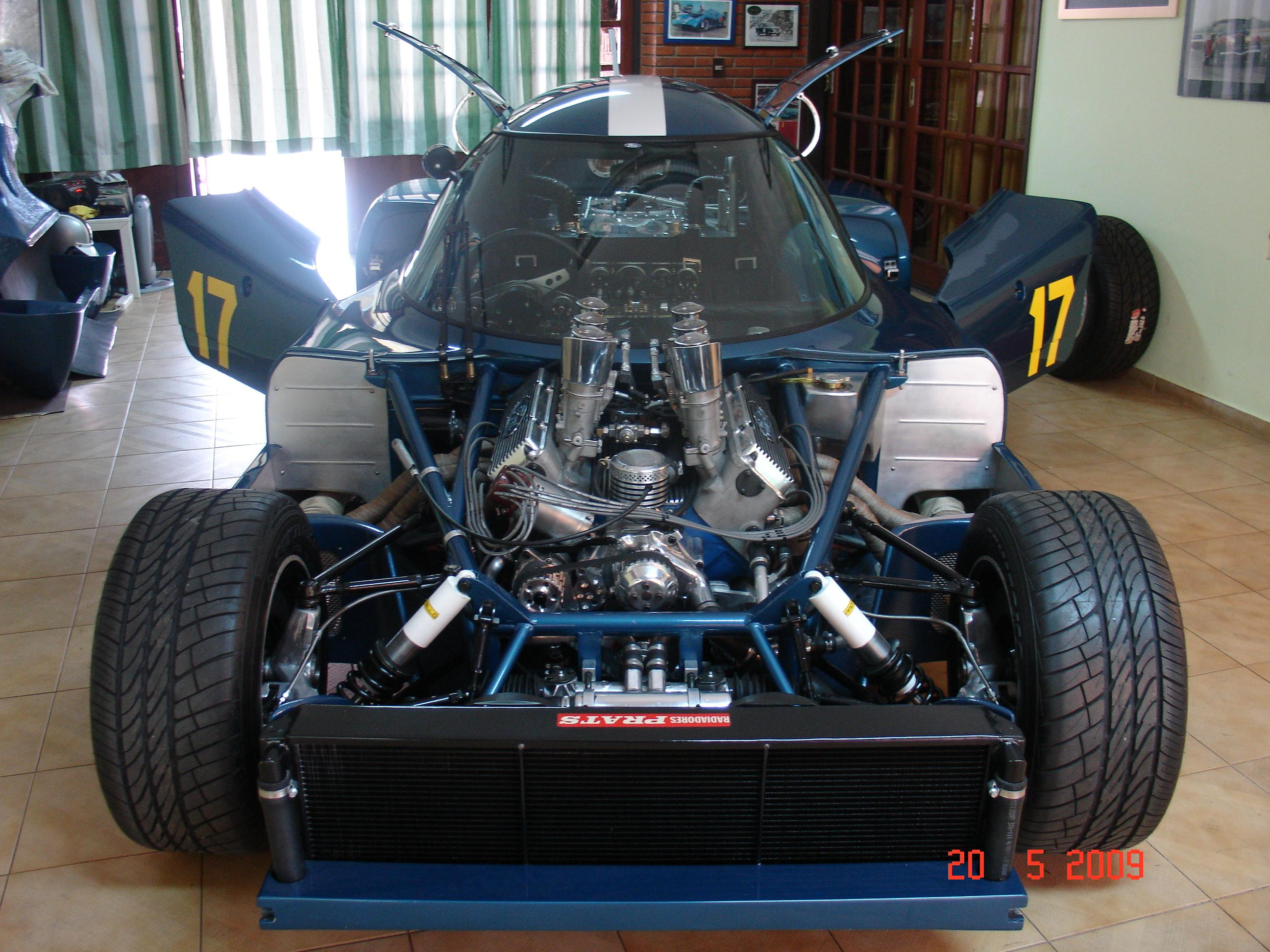
The Huayra SP's mechanics

In 2005, Mr Zeziola found the surviving Huayra in Córdoba, and began working on his second Pronello-Ford. Again, Pronello himself supervised and collaborated with Zeziola in the restoration of the Huayra.
