= Baufer-Ford =

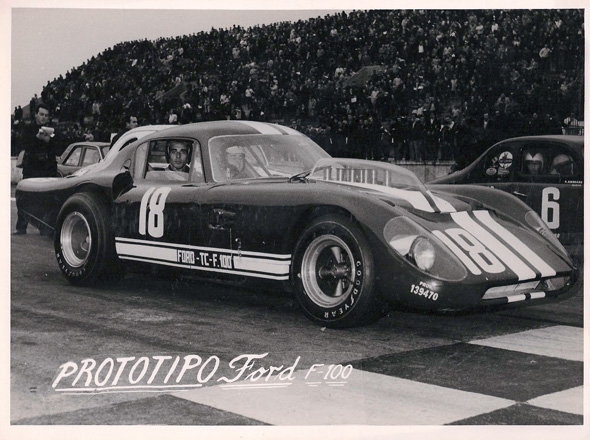
- Category: ACTC stock car
- Constructor: Ford
- Designer(s): Baufer; Horacio Steven
- Production: 1967

Technical specifications
- Suspension (front): Double wishbones, pushrod actuated coil springs over shock absorbers, anti-roll bar (Deformable parallelogram)
- Suspension (rear): Double wishbones, pushrod actuated coil springs love shock absorbers, anti-roll bar (formerly rigid axle)
- Engine: Chevrolet 250 cu in (4 L) OHV I6 naturally-aspirated FR; Ford 292 cu in (5 L) OHV V8 naturally-aspirated FR
- Transmission: ZF 4-speed manual + reverse
- Power: 275–380 hp (205–283 kW)
- Weight: 950 kg (2,094 lb)
- Brakes: Disc brakes all-round

Competition history

The Baufer-Ford or Steven-Ford was a racing prototype designed and manufactured in Argentina by the defunct Baufer bodybuilder, and serviced by the preparer Horacio Steven to compete in Turismo Carretera. This prototype was created at the request of the official Ford Motor Argentina team, to face the IKA-Renault Torino, which the successful preparer Oreste Berta had presented in 1966, making the official IKA team debut. Ford's objective was to fight and hunt these cars prepared in Alta Gracia, in order to recover the leadership lost in 1966. With the regulatory change of 1967, which allowed the creation of racing prototypes at the pleasure and convenience of the preparers, the prototype devised had V8 engines from Ford F-100 trucks and was mounted on the chassis of a Ford T. This car was indistinctly known as Baufer-Ford for its creator body, or as Steven-Ford, for its preparer.

Although it had been possible to create a highly competitive car at first glance, the results were brutally negative, since the cars that had been prepared were the protagonists of terrible accidents, the last one in which the driver Oscar Cabalén died. These results caused Ford to withdraw official support for Steven and he was forced to leave the category.

Paradoxically, a year later, Carlos Pairetti decided to hire Steven again to redesign this prototype, but in this case, equipping it with a Chevrolet 250 engine, giving rise to the Trueno Naranja, which won the 1968 title.

== History ==
In 1967, the CDA of the Automóvil Club Argentino decided to change the Highway Tourism regulations regarding automobiles. The new regulation stipulated that car preparers were allowed to create racing prototypes at will and at convenience.

IKA, the new official team that had been presented in 1966 with the attention of Oreste Berta, continued with the development of the IKA Torino. On this occasion, IKA decided to test a series of reforms on its flagship car covered by the new regulations, which would later give rise to the prototypes known as Liebre-Torino.

Chrysler had not presented major changes, however, the new regulations allowed Luis Rubén Di Palma to prepare his Chevrolet coupe with a Valiant IV engine. Carlos Pairetti resorted to the body of a Chrysler coupe, which he equipped with a Chevrolet engine. It was the genesis of the famous Barracuda-Chevrolet.

Chevrolet for its part had among its hosts the Chevitú, a model that under the direction of José Froilán González, was created on a Chevrolet Nova II coupé and with the engine of a Chevrolet 400 for the official team. Also, the Bellavigna brothers, who had disassociated themselves from the official team, were in charge of developing a model based on a Kaiser Brigantine and with a Chevrolet engine. This car was made by the chassis driver Jorge Parodi, and received the name La Garrafa, due to its color and its sponsor ( AgipGas ). Also, Felix PeduzziHe prepared a rather unusual and old car for the time: An ancient '30 Chevrolet coupe equipped with a 250 engine of the same brand. Due to its characteristic shape, the car received the nickname "The Square".

Despite all this, Ford continued to rely on his old banners, including the Emiliozzi Brothers ' Galera and Eduardo Casa's El Tractor, runner-up the previous year. Also, the official team had the development of the Falcon F-100, with Oscar Cabalén at the helm, who after having obtained a victory, showed up to run later with a Ford Mustang with an F-100 engine. However, the need to renew itself was seen in the Ford hosts. It was so that in order to achieve his goal and stop the advance of IKA (the rival on duty), Ford decided to hire an old engineer who had worked for IKA and who knew the rival's environment very well: Horacio Steven.

Steven was out of work after IKA withdrew support to make way for Oreste Berta. When he left there, he was hired by Ford for the development of a new prototype created by the Baufer company. In its attempt to make its laurels green again, Ford's idea was to create a highly competitive vehicle. To do this, Baufer based his project on the chassis of a Ford T, incorporating a V8 engine from Ford F-100 trucks. For this project, Steven had the official support of Ford, and to crew his new machines the chosen ones were Atilio Viale del Carril, who in 1965 debuted a Ford Falcon with official support, and Oscar Cabalén, who had been campaigning in 1967 aboard the official team's Ford Mustang with an F-100 engine.

These cars were developed according to the new regulations of the year 1967. For their development, the structure was mounted on the chassis of a Ford T, which was reinforced to be able to withstand the demands imposed on it by the enormous power and weight of the 292 V8 engines. cubic inches with which it was equipped. The body design involved some hits and misses. On the one hand, the aerodynamic conception with which it was designed was very revolutionary, showing an innovative design with curved lines that predominated on the roof and the trunk, giving the appearance of being a true fearsome rival for all.

However, this car had its cons, since to make it lighter, in order to reach higher speeds, its nose, and rear part was made of a highly flammable polymer, which in the event of a minor accident with fire included, the car would be consumed in a matter of seconds. In addition, the car's gasoline tanks were located on both sides of the doors.

Their presentation was very promising, appearing at the Buenos Aires Autodromo on July 16, 1967, with a victory in their series. The remaining series were won by Andrea Vianini (aboard La Garrafa) and by Jorge Cupeiro with Chevitú.

=== Skills ===
In this race, the Baufer-Ford started in the lead along with other drivers, including Andrea Vianini who won the pole position. The race began when Julio Devoto's car stopped at the start with transmission problems, unable to remove it from the road. The actions of the banderilleros in the first lap made Atilio Viale del Carril, who had taken the lead, park at the start to wait for the rest, then Copello and Vianini arrived, so they began to slow down. However, other pilots who came from behind (among them Carlos Marincovich, could not do it and rammed the cars. In the incident, Viale del Carril's car was hit and his companion suffered a broken arm.

After that accident, the TC returned to the Buenos Aires Autodrome a month later. Viale del Carril had changed companions. During the third series, Viale's car lost its way in a curve against a wire fence, digging into the ground and starting a series of bumps that ended with the car engulfed in flames. Viale managed to get out of the car, but his companion, known as Pepe Giménez, was not trapped inside the burning car. The unfortunate thing was that the anti-flame overalls that they had to use were being processed at customs and could not be withdrawn.

=== Cabalén fatal accident ===
Shortly after, the return of San Nicolás would come. Oscar Cabalén was going to be in charge of running the Baufer-Ford. For that occasion, Cabalén decided to test the car on the open road. While they were testing the car, Cabalén's companion introduces a friend to the pilot and invites him to take a ride in the Baufer. In a curve and trying to overtake a truck, the prototype stepped on the shoulder, stuck on the ground, and began to tumble to also catch fire. Both Cabalén and his occasional companion named Guillermo Arnaiz died.

With these accidents, Ford decided to momentarily withdraw its official support from Turismo Carretera and also break relations with Horacio Steven, leaving the honor of the brand to those pilots who ran with Ford Falcon.

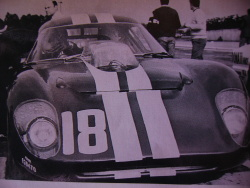
Front view of the Steven-Ford

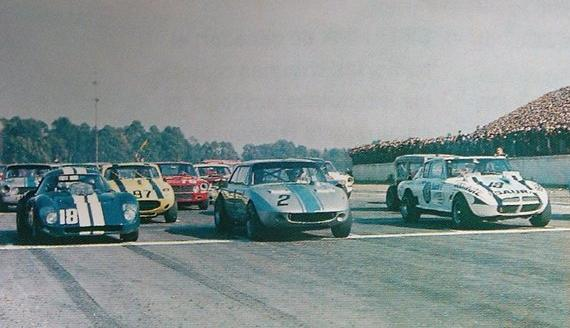
Start of TC race. The Steven-Ford can be seen on the left of the photo.

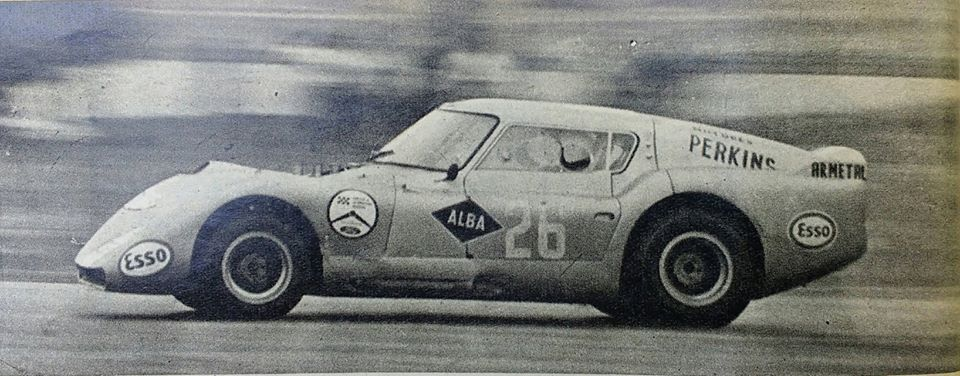
Baufer-Ford de Carmelo Galbato en la primera carrera de Sport Prototipo Argentino, Buenos Aires 1969

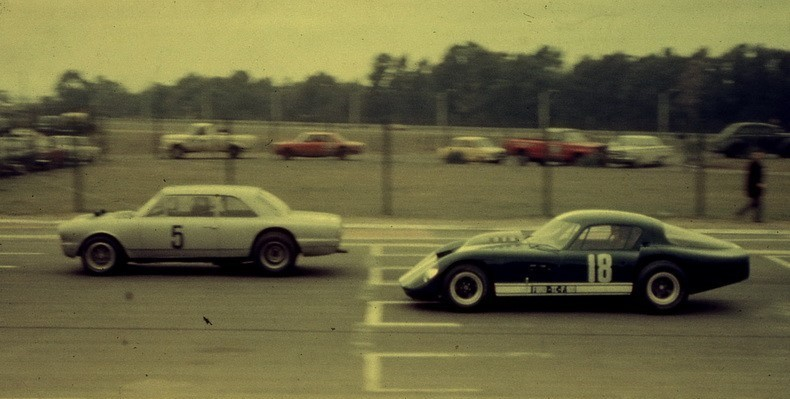
Atilio Viale in his Baufer-Ford prototype (number 18) chasing Héctor Luis Gradassi's Torino 380w (number 5) during the "VII Premio de TC Autódromo de Buenos Aires" sixteenth round of the 1967 Turismo Carretera season.

== Orange Thunder ==
Paradoxically, in 1968, Carlos Pairetti, a Chevrolet driver for almost 12 years, heard the news that Steven kept the failed prototype, so he decided to buy it and develop a new vehicle on its basis, which he would reconvert by motoring it with a Chevrolet 250 engine. cubic inches and performing different reforms compared to the original car, in aspects related to safety, such as relocating its fuel tank to the rear and replacing the car's polymer tail with a metal one. These replacements would finally prove successful, Pairetti managing to win several competitions in 1968, which would finally end up giving him the title of Road Tourism champion that year.
