= Heriberto Pronello =

Argentine automotive designer and constructor

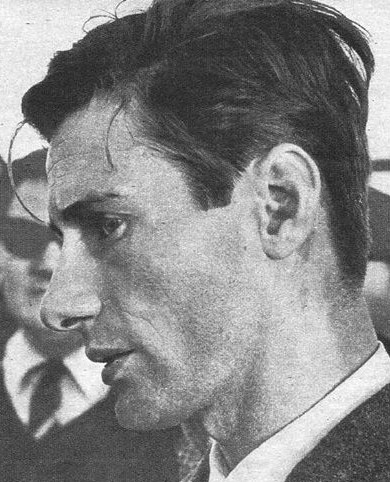
- Born: Heriberto Pronello; February 2, 1936 (age 90); Morteros, Córdoba Province, Argentina
- Education: Aeronautical engineering
- Alma mater: Escuela de Aviación Militar, Córdoba
- Occupations: Designer, constructor and engineer
- Years active: 1965–present
- Employer(s): Industrias Kaiser Argentina; Pronello Competition Research
- Known for: Designer and builder of racing prototypes
- Notable work: Torino Liebre, Pronello Huayra Ford

Heriberto Pronello (born 2 February 1936 in Morteros) is an Argentine designer, constructor and engineer who has worked in the fields of motorsport, defense, and industrial development. He was the builder of the Torino Liebre cars, which stood out in the Argentine Turismo Carretera category during the 1960s and 1970s.

His career began in the 1960s, when he was hired by Industrias Kaiser Argentina to develop modifications to its flagship model, the IKA Torino, with the goal of competing in Turismo Carretera. After leaving IKA, he went on to develop a prototype for Ford Motor Argentina, named the Halcón TC. When the "TC B" division (a category for sports prototypes) was cancelled in 1971, Pronello turned to military engineering, working mainly at the Argentine state-owned TAMSE (builders of the Tanque Argentino Mediano) and the Brazilian company Engesa (developers of the Cascavel and Jararaca armored vehicles).

After leaving IKA in 1968, Pronello founded Pronello Competition Research, his own engineering and motorsport development company, based in Buenos Aires.

Afterward, he also worked on armored and official state vehicles, such as the presidential limousines based on the IKA Renault Rambler Ambassador, starting in 1967.

In 1979, Pronello won a design contest in Brazil for the Alfa Romeo 2300 ti 4, made locally between 1980 and 1986.

By the mid-1980s, Pronello returned to motorsports, designing and building the Renault Fuego for Silvio Oltra, which won the TC2000 in 1987, and the Peugeot 505 raced by Jose "Coco" Fortunato in the same category in 1988. Later on, taking on the championship winning Ford Falcon for Oscar Aventin in the 1991 and 1992 seasons.

In 1994 Pronello introduced his "Mini Auto Popular" (M.A.P.), a light, economical car, to be produced and built in collaboration between Argentina and Spain.

His latest major project in motorsports was an evolution of the Liebre concept, adapted to compete in the Dakar Rally. This prototype, built in 2008, was presented for the 2009 Argentina–Chile Dakar Rally with a 221 cubic inch Ford straight six engine, similar to that of the Argentine-built Ford Falcon. However, a gearbox failure prevented the car from starting the race.

As of 2025, Pronello is working on a revamped and modernized sports car based on the original concept of the Liebre, called the "Liebre IV", the fourth evolution of the model, carrying the ethos with modern technology.

== Biography ==
Pronello was born in Morteros, later moving to Mar Chiquita. He completed secondary school there before moving to the city of Córdoba, where he enrolled in the Escuela de Aviación Militar. Although he only stayed for a few months, he began to acquire knowledge of aerodynamics that would later be applied to automobiles.

After graduating, he settled in Villa Nueva, where he opened his first workshop to begin designing and building mechanical components. Initially, he worked outside motorsport while also running a laundry business, but soon, with the support of his wife Laura Borga, he began manufacturing automotive parts for Jeep IKA vehicles and cylinders for motorcycles. In 1965, he had his first direct involvement with motorsport, designing a plastic aerodynamic nosecone for a Valiant III, which debuted on track that year with Ricardo De Paoli as driver. The car was recognized by the Automóvil Club Argentino as the most attractive of the category. Around the same time, Pronello also collaborated with former Formula One driver José Froilán González on the Chevitú prototype.

His innovations in aerodynamics attracted the attention of Industrias Kaiser Argentina, who hired him to lead the development of its official factory racing team. Another prominent Argentine engineer, Oreste Berta, was recruited to work on the engines. Together, Pronello and Berta created one of the most memorable teams in the history of Argentine motorsport.

In August 2024, the Legislature of the City of Buenos Aires declared Pronello a "Distinguished Personality of Buenos Aires" in the fields of culture and sport.

== Prototypes ==
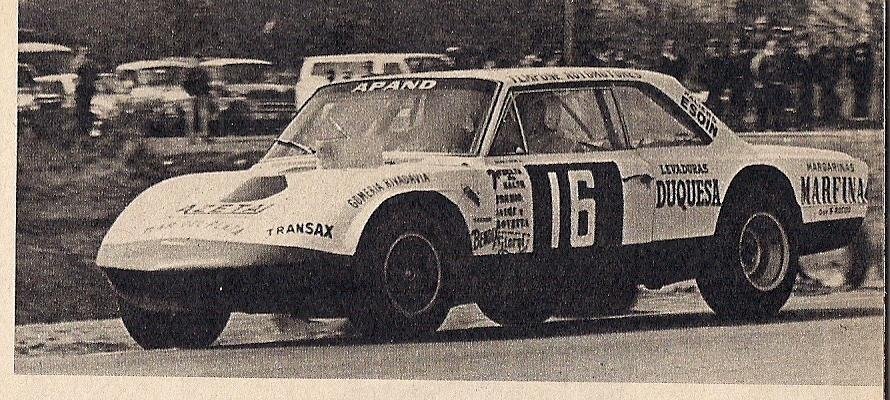
Torino Liebre

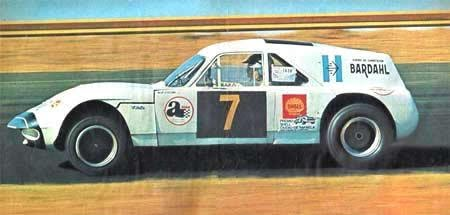
Liebre Mk II Torino

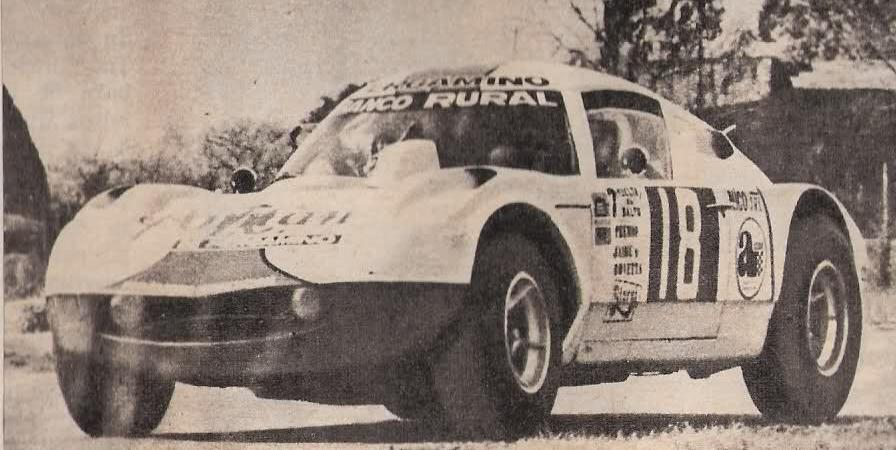
Liebre Mk III Torino

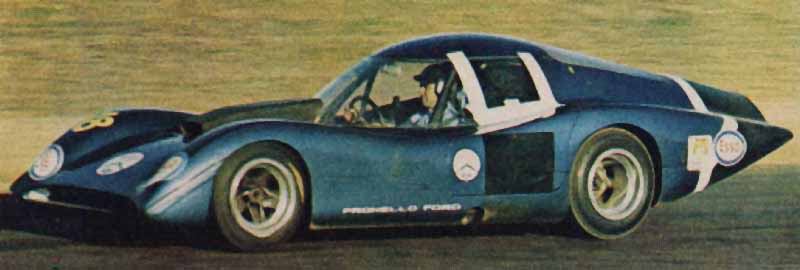
Halcón TC

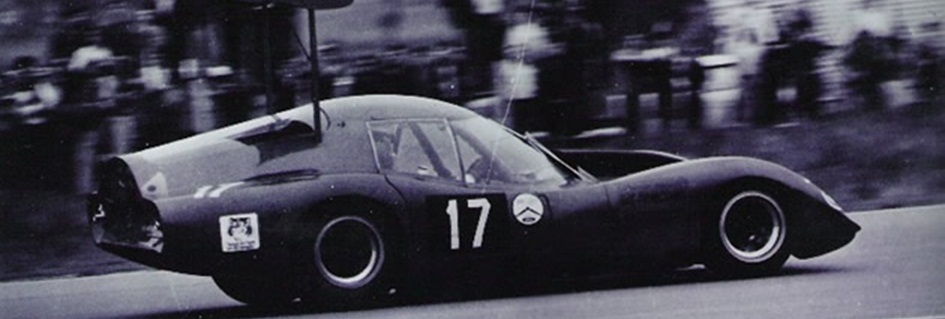
Pronello Huayra Ford

== Pioneering ground effect with the Pronello Huayra ==
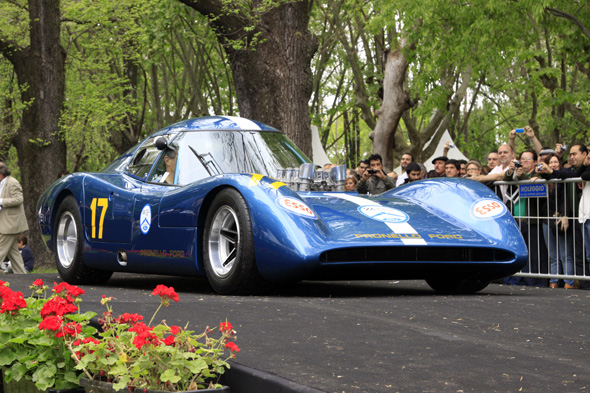
Pronello Huayra Ford at Autoclásica, Argentina

The Pronello Huayra Ford was a sports prototype racing car designed by Heriberto Pronello for the Sport Prototipo Argentino category. Developed in 1968, the car debuted in 1969 at the Córdoba circuit, driven by Carlos Reutemann and Carlos Pascualini.

The Huayra's design incorporated a flat underbody and diffuser to generate ground effect, making it the first racing car to apply this aerodynamic principle. This provided significant downforce without the additional drag of other systems.

In 2023, chassis #002 of the Pronello Huayra was invited to the Goodwood Festival of Speed in the United Kingdom, one of the world's most prestigious motorsport events. During the event, it was taken to the Catesby Tunnel for a full aerodynamic analysis, led by Argentine engineer Sergio Rinland. Tests confirmed that the Huayra achieved the aerodynamic efficiency that Pronello had originally envisioned.

== Championships ==
Title	Category	Driver	Model	Year
Champion	(Argentina) Turismo Carretera	Eduardo José Copello	Liebre Mk II Torino	1967
Champion	(Argentina) Turismo Carretera	Gastón Perkins	Liebre Mk III Torino	1969
Champion	(Argentina) TC B	Eduardo José Copello	Liebre Mk II Torino	1970
Champion	(Argentina) TC2000	Silvio Oltra	Renault Fuego	1987
Champion	(Argentina) Turismo Carretera	Oscar Aventín	Ford Falcon	1991
Champion	(Argentina) Turismo Carretera	Oscar Aventín	Ford Falcon	1992

== Pronello M.A.P ==
Pronello MAP Project was an initiative in the 1990s aimed at developing an affordable, fully Argentine-built compact car. Led by engineer Heriberto Pronello, the project was backed by the Buenos Aires provincial government under Governor Eduardo Duhalde.

Launched in 1994, the project sought to produce a “Mini Auto Popular” with a maximum retail price of 5,000 pesos (or dollars, under the Convertibility Plan). The vehicle was designed to weigh 500 kilograms, accommodate four passengers, and achieve fuel efficiency of one liter per 20 kilometers, powered by an 800 cc, two-cylinder V engine producing 48 hp. The car was intended to be manufactured by a cooperative of auto parts producers in Tandil, while the chassis and bodywork were to be built in Spain.

Despite significant progress, including the completion of a full-scale prototype and engine tests, the project was canceled due to political disputes between the national government and the province, which led to the diversion of state funding. The MAP prototype was displayed in France, but mass production never occurred. The project remains a notable attempt to develop a low-cost, domestic car in Argentina.

== Honors and tributes ==
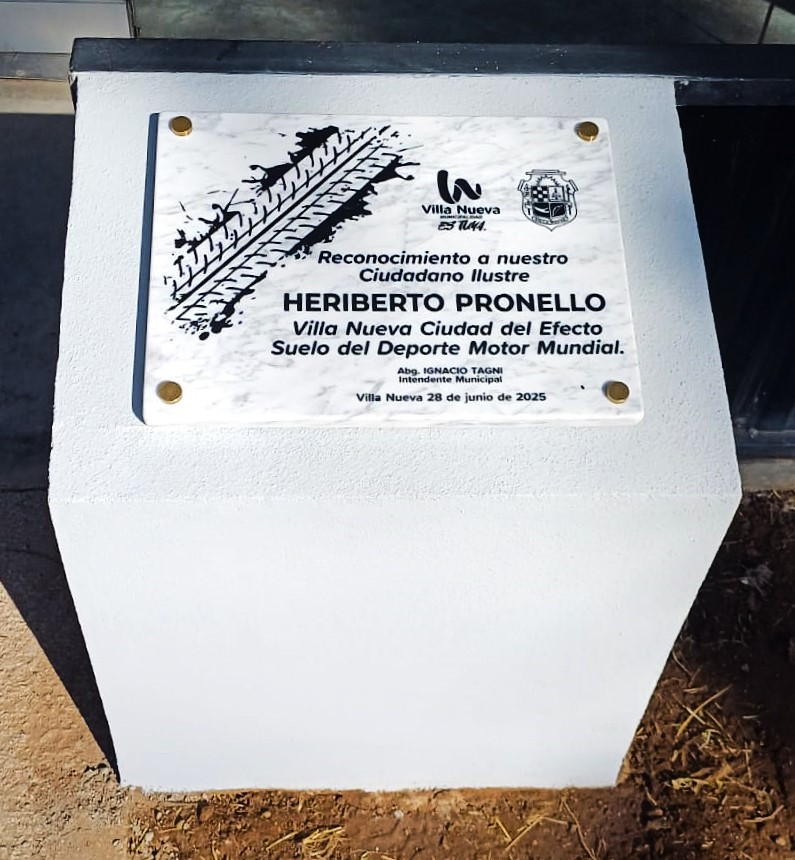
Heriberto Pronello

Throughout his career, Pronello has been honored by several municipalities and institutions for his contributions to Argentine engineering and motorsport.

In September 2015, Pronello was honored as a distinguished visitor in the city of Rosario, Santa Fe.

In January 2023, he was named Guest of Honor in the province of La Pampa as part of cultural events celebrating Argentine motorsport.

In February 2024, he was honored as a Distinguished Visitor in Miramar de Ansenuza, Córdoba Province. In March 2024, he was declared Distinguished Citizen of Villa María.

In August 2024, the Buenos Aires City Legislature declared him an Illustrious Citizen of Buenos Aires, recognizing his contributions to Argentina's technological and industrial development and his legacy in automotive design.

In March 2025, Pronello was honored in two cities in Córdoba: as Guest of Honor in Morteros and as Illustrious Citizen of San Francisco. In June 2025, he was declared Illustrious Citizen of Villa Nueva.

Finally, in August 2025, the University of Buenos Aires awarded him an honorary doctorate, the institution's highest academic distinction.

== Honorary doctorate from the University of Buenos Aires ==
In August 2025, Pronello was awarded the title of Doctor Honoris Causa by the University of Buenos Aires (UBA), one of the most prestigious academic institutions in Latin America. The distinction recognized his career in engineering, his contributions to automotive design in Argentina, and his influence on the technical education of generations of students and engineers.
