= Liebre Torino =

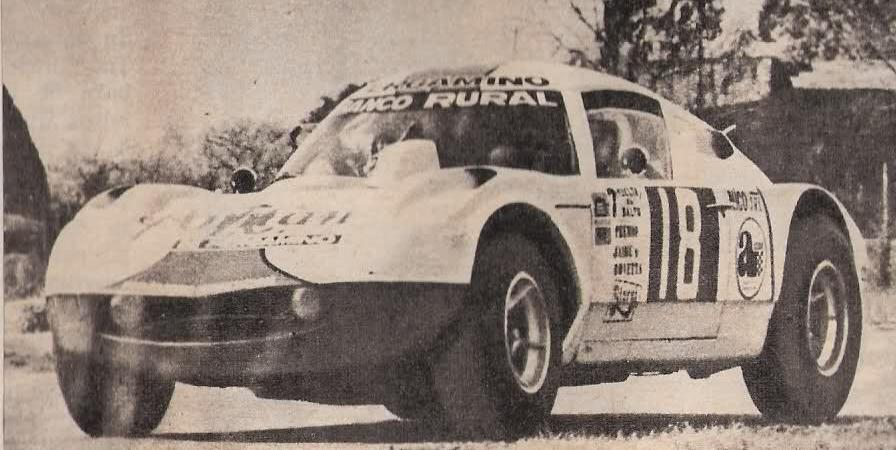
- Category: ACTC stock car
- Designer: Heriberto Pronello
- Production: 1967–1970

Technical specifications
- Suspension (front): Double wishbones, pushrod actuated coil springs over shock absorbers, anti-roll bar (Deformable parallelogram)
- Suspension (rear): Double wishbones, pushrod actuated coil springs love shock absorbers, anti-roll bar (formerly rigid axle)
- Length: 4,100 mm (161.4 in)
- Width: 1,710 mm (67.3 in)
- Height: 1,150 mm (45.3 in)
- Axle track: 1,420 mm (55.9 in) (front and rear)
- Wheelbase: 2,720 mm (107.1 in)
- Engine: Tornado 4.0 L (244 cu in) SOHC I6 naturally-aspirated FR; Ford 5.0 L (305 cu in) OHV V8 naturally-aspirated FR
- Transmission: ZF 4-speed manual + reverse
- Power: 275–380 hp (205–283 kW)
- Weight: 950 kg (2,094 lb)
- Brakes: Disc brakes all-round

Competition history

The Liebre Torino, also known as the Hare Torino, is a series of race cars that were manufactured between the 1960s and 1970s in Argentina, for use in the Turismo Carretera and Sport Prototipo Argentino categories. These are prototypes created by coachbuilder Heriberto Pronello and motorist Oreste Berta on the basis of the IKA Torino production car.

The idea of creating these cars was feasible thanks to the revolutionary regulations imposed at the end of the 60s in order to generate an evolution within the category, a product of the fact that they had been competing since the 40s with the same units of that time. This extensive regulation opened up a true range of possibilities for both pilots and trainers to compete with models designed to their liking and convenience, and combining elements from different brands. Among these machines, the Liebre-Torino marked dominance within the specialty.

There were four evolutions of the Liebre-Torino, known as:

- Hare Mk I
- Hare Mk I and ½
- Hare Mk II
- Hare Mk III.

Of these units, the Liebre Mk II and Mk III became champions in 1967 and 1969 with Eduardo Copello and Gastón Perkins, respectively.

== Hare Mk I Torino ==
In 1966 and attentive to what was happening in Road Tourism with the arrival of the first compact cars, Industrias Kaiser Argentina decided to enter the aforementioned category, presenting a completely new model: the IKA Torino. The first official team was under the command of the renowned trainer Horacio Steven (who in 1968 would obtain the title for preparing the Thunder Orange Chevrolet engine), who did not have much brilliance in the direction of it. It was then that IKA decided to hire Oreste Berta.

His landing on the official team was somewhat revolutionary, he also showed his innovative stamp by trying to implement his own ideas. Despite the fact that the new regulation imposed for Highway Tourism allowed the free preparation of units at ease and convenience, IKA tried to present its units, maintaining its original lines, in order to achieve a greater identification of the product with the buying public. However, Berta tried to get the most out of this new regulation and pour it into the preparation of her cars. It was then that she became associated with Heriberto Pronello, who worked for IKA and with whom they began the development of new units. Pronello undertook the construction of a pointed design nose on reinforced fiber, which ended up giving his car a highly aerodynamic cut. Thus, at the team's debut in 1967, two of its three cars maintained their original lines, while the third used the novelty designed by Pronello. The first two vehicles were entrusted to the drivers Héctor Gradassi and Jorge Ternengo, while the refurbished Torino was used by Eduardo Copello. It was the beginning of the society that would be known as the "CGT" (for C opello, Gradassi, and T ernengo).

This last model was known as "Lebrel" because an American engineer called it that the first day he saw it (believing it was the support car since in the United States reserve cars are known that way). . The car finally adopted the pseudonym "Hare Mk I-Torino", a product of the deformation of the nickname given by this engineer and the model on which it was based.

== Hare Mk I and ½ Torino ==
The debut of the Liebre Mk I took place at the Rafaela Grand Prix in 1967. That race was won by Héctor Gradassi with a conventional Torino 380 W. However, according to Oreste Berta, Eduardo Copello's Liebre was 5 km/h higher than Gradassi's and Ternengo's Torino, which maintained their original lines. At that time, the Hare Mk I, apart from its revolutionary trunk, had been equipped with a new suspension system that allowed it to have a better hold on the road compared to its "big brother".

These solutions suggested by Berta for the design of the vehicles of the official team led Pronello to project itself once again and experiment with improvements in the design of the Hare. It was then that he decided to implement new parameters in the vehicle, shortening its chassis, running the engine a few centimeters further into the cabin, and adding a nose with a slightly sharper section, thanks to the cut that was made to the chassis. In this way, Pronello created a new evolution, which was called "Hare Mk I and ½-Torino". This Hare presented as novelties, in addition to the cut in its chassis and the relocation of its engine that allowed a better distribution of weights., the development of new suspensions, presented modifications in the anchorage points of the tensioners that improved the car's hold.

This Hare was presented a few races later to the Hare Mk I, and it was driven by Jorge Ternengo. However, beyond the fact that it would continue to compete in the following years, the prototype would undergo its most radical evolution that same year, due to the dizzying advances posed by the new regulations, presenting a new design in the middle of that championship.

== Hare Mk II Torino ==
The arrival of the Liebre Mk I and ½ made the other terminals rethink the use of their competition units for Road Tourism. Ford was the first to respond to Berta and Pronello's proposal, putting the Baufer-Ford on the track, a prototype designed by Alain Baudena and used by the firm for its official team. The attention of this vehicle was in charge of Horacio Steven, who to motorize these cars implemented the V8 engines of the Ford F-100 trucks. From Chevrolet, the most attractive models began to appear, such as the evolution of the Chevitú created by José Froilán González and used by the official squad, the Garrafacreated by the Bellavigna brothers and driven by Andrea Vianini or the Barracuda-Chevrolet used by Carlos Paretti. This batch of prototypes put IKA at a disadvantage compared to the rest, so Pronello once again set out to design a prototype that would neutralize the advance of the competition. The answer to all this challenge, was baptized with the name of "Pachamama", being renamed later as "Liebre Mk II-Torino".

The Mk II Hare was the most radical evolution that the prototype had experienced, this being a born competition prototype. Nothing remained of the original design of the IKA Torino except the engine and its gearbox. For this model, the bodywork of the Torino was taken as a base, from which the trunk, trunk, and roof were cut, being adapted to the chassis of the Liebre Mk I y ½ and a trunk similar to that of this model. But the most radical change would be on the roof since the roof of a Renault Dauphine was used for its design, which was adapted for the new bodywork. The rear of the car featured a design reminiscent of old estate cars, which was so aerodynamic that it never required the use of spoilers for its development.

The debut of the new model took place on August 17, 1967, with two units available for the two main pilots of the squad, Eduardo Copello, and Héctor Gradassi. In their debut, both units ended up with their windshields broken and with various suspicions about the causes of said failures. La Liebre Mk II marked an important domain and took the championship with Eduardo Copello from TC, who was the first champion with a brand other than the traditional Chevrolet and Ford.

== Hare Mk III Torino ==
The appearance of the Mk II Hare on the tracks generated a revolution within the Road Tourism environment. After the success achieved in 1967, the official IKA team would end up dissolving once the championship was over, giving rise to new teams. In 1968, Pronello had already managed to create four Liebre-Torino, which he had to distribute after the dissolution of the official team. Oreste Berta had managed to get hold of two of these units by creating his own structure, which was sponsored by the lubricant firm Bardahl and led by Eduardo Copello and Nasif Estéfano as pilots. The other two Liebre-Torino remained in the hands of Gradassi and Gastón Perkins, who decided to present their own structures.

To all this, the competition came to the track with new weapons. Ford renewed its squad after the failed attempt the previous year with the Baufer. In this way, it put the so-called Falcon F-100 on the track, a prototype based on the Ford Falcon to which a reduction in its width was applied and it was equipped with the V8 engine of the Ford F-100 trucks. General Motors once again trusted José Froilán González who presented the third evolution of the Chevitú, known as Chevytres. While in the middle of that year, a prototype emerged that would end up revolutionizing this championship: The Orange Thunder. This year, Copello and Gradassi would each try on their own to defend the honor of Torino, however, their attempts were in vain before the onslaught provided by the Orange Thunder with Carlos Pairetti at the wheel.

It was so, in 1969, Pronello would return to develop a new evolution in the Hare. He decided to redesign the body of the Hare Mk II, modifying the roof drop at the rear, giving it a sharper profile and higher drag coefficient. As for other items such as the suspension or the chassis, the new design maintained the characteristics of its predecessor, the torpedo, and the location of the seats being reformed, among others, to improve weight distribution. Pronello would end up presenting his new work, which received the name "Pronello Nova", finally renamed by users as "Hare Mk III-Torino". The first Liebre was presented in 1969 and its first driver was the pilot Gastón Perkins.

A peculiarity that Pronello had that year was that, since it was no longer linked to IKA, it decided to rescind the exclusivity of its designs for those users of that brand, leaving them available to pilots from other brands who showed interest in developing this prototype. with impellers from other brands such as Chevrolet or Ford. The most relevant case was that of the champion Carlos Pairetti, who put aside his prototype named Thunder Orange to buy a Hare from Pronello, which he equipped with a Chevrolet impeller and decorated with the same color as his previous car, giving rise to the Orange Nova, a name that derived from the original name of the car and its color. Torino would end up taking that year's title with Perkins behind the wheel of a Liebre Mk III-Torino.

In the following years, the Liebre continued to dominate the actions on the field of play, taking a new title in 1970, again at the hands of Eduardo Copello. But on this occasion and in order to be able to give more participation to the production models, Formula A was created and Formula B was created in parallel to it, which would end up becoming the Argentine Sports Prototype a few years later. Precisely, Copello would take the Formula B title with the Liebre Mk III, while Luis Rubén Di Palma would take the Formula A crown.
