= Ground effect (cars) =

Aerodynamic principle

In car design, ground effect is a series of effects that have been exploited in automotive aerodynamics to create downforce, particularly in racing cars, through underbody tunnels and floor design. This has been the successor to the earlier dominant aerodynamic focus on streamlining. The international Formula One series and American racing IndyCars employ ground effects in their engineering and designs. Similarly, they are also employed in other racing series to some extent; however, across Europe, many series employ regulations (or complete bans) to limit its effectiveness on safety grounds.

== Theory ==
In racing cars, a designer's aim is for increased downforce and grip to achieve higher cornering speeds. A substantial amount of downforce is available by understanding the ground to be part of the aerodynamic system in question, hence the name "ground effect". Starting in the mid-1960s, 'wings' were routinely used in the design of race cars to increase downforce (which is not a type of ground effect). Designers shifted their efforts at understanding air flow around the perimeter, body skirts, and undersides of the vehicle to increase downforce with less drag than compared to using a wing.

This kind of ground effect is easily illustrated by taking a tarpaulin out on a windy day and holding it close to the ground: it can be observed that when close enough to the ground the tarp will be drawn towards the ground. This is due to Bernoulli's principle; as the tarp gets closer to the ground, the cross sectional area available for the air passing between it and the ground shrinks. This causes the air to accelerate and as a result pressure under the tarp drops while the pressure on top is unaffected, and together this results in a net downward force. The same principles apply to cars.

The Bernoulli principle is not the only aspect of mechanics in generating ground-effect downforce. A large part of ground-effect performance comes from taking advantage of viscosity. In the tarp example above, neither the tarp nor the ground is moving. The boundary layer between the two surfaces works to slow down the air between them which lessens the Bernoulli effect. When a car moves over the ground, the boundary layer on the ground becomes helpful. In the reference frame of the car, the ground is moving backwards at some speed. As the ground moves, it pulls on the air above it and causes it to move faster. This enhances the Bernoulli effect and increases downforce. It is an example of Couette flow.

While such downforce-producing aerodynamic techniques are often referred to with the catch-all term "ground effect", they are not strictly speaking a result of the same aerodynamic phenomenon as the ground effect which is apparent in aircraft at very low altitudes.

== History ==
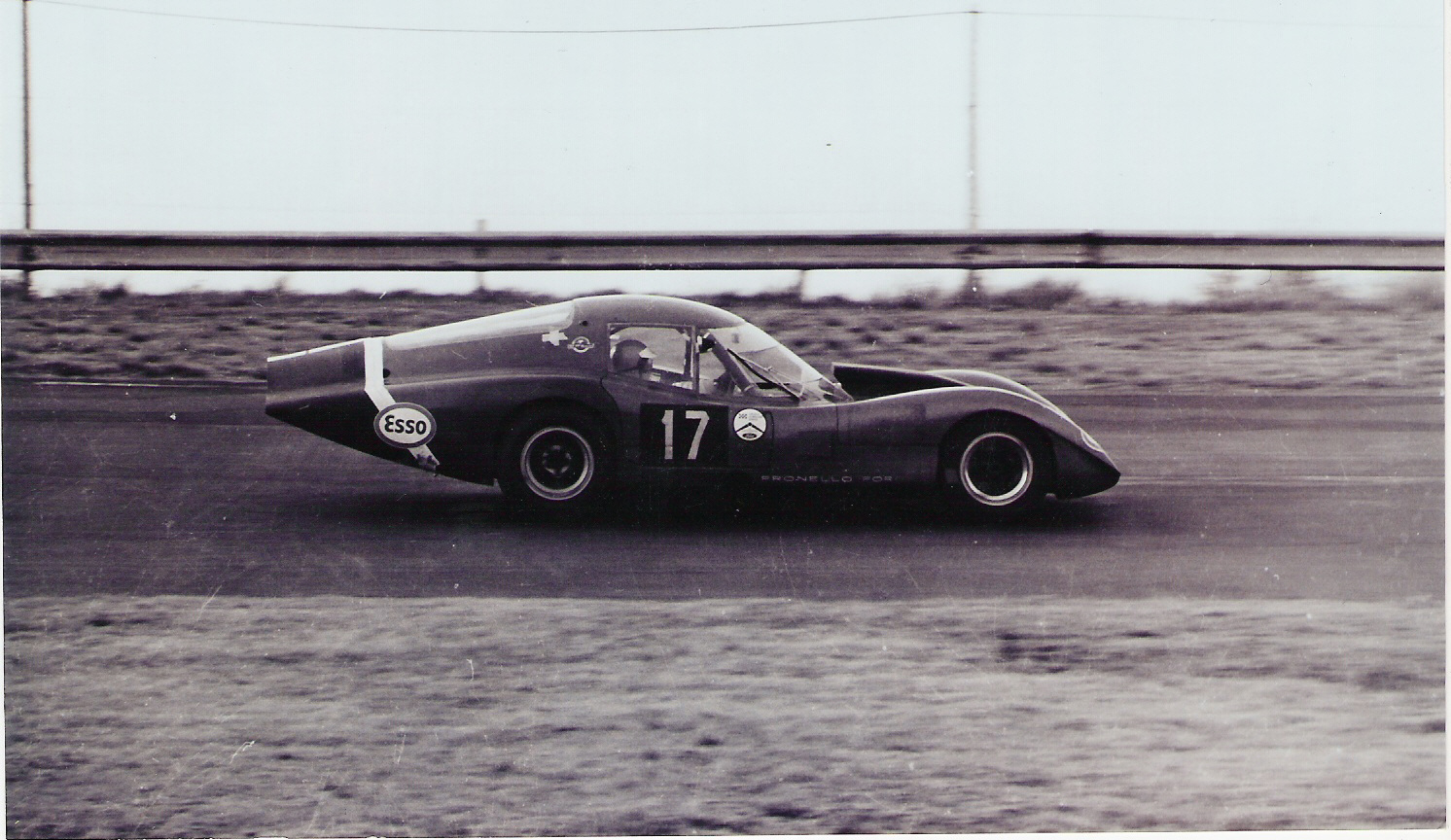
Pronello Huayra-Ford, in its long tail, high speed configuration

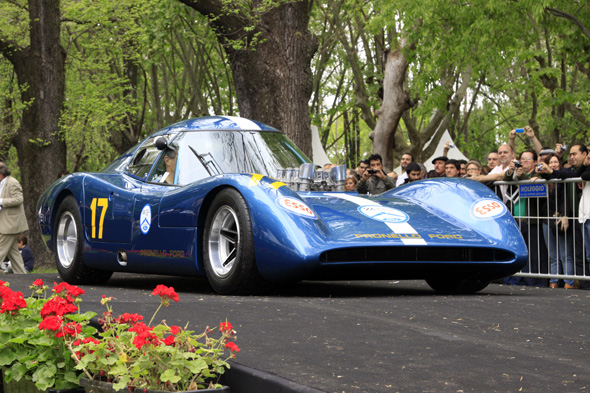
Pronello Huayra-Ford

American Jim Hall developed and built his Chaparral cars around the principles of ground effects, pioneering them. His 1961 car attempted to use the shaped underside method but there were too many other aerodynamic problems with the car for it to work properly. His 1966 cars used a dramatic high wing for their downforce. His Chaparral 2J "sucker car" of 1970 was revolutionary. It had two fans at the rear of the car driven by a dedicated two-stroke engine; it also had "skirts", which left only a minimal gap between car and ground, to seal the cavity from the atmosphere. Although it did not win a race, some competition had lobbied for its ban, which came into place at the end of that year. Movable aerodynamic devices were banned from most branches of the sport.

In 1968, the Argentine designer and engineer, Heriberto Pronello, developed the Pronello Huayra-Ford for the Sport Prototipo Argentino category, making its first appearance in Córdoba for the 1969 season with Carlos Reutemann and Carlos Pascualini as drivers.

During 1968, a 1/5 scale model was made, which was tested in the wind tunnel of the Fábrica Militar de Aviones (FMA) usually employed by the Argentine Air Force, demonstrating the functionality of the ground effect at that scale. In 2023, the Pronello Huayra chassis #002 was invited to the Goodwood Festival Of Speed. During its stay in England, the car was taken to the Catesby tunnel, where a complete aerodynamic analysis was carried out by Argentine engineer and professor Sergio Rinland.

"We always thought it had ground effect... When Heriberto tested it at the National University of Córdoba, he verified its air resistance with a 1/5 scale model that was perfect, without door and hood openings, without the intake turrets..." Rinland said.

He further added, “The tests we did in the Catesby Tunnel demonstrated its great aerodynamic efficiency: we obtained a Cx 0.25 with the short tail and a Cx 0.23 with the long tail, which it used on the fastest circuits. Almost, almost what Heriberto had measured at the time”

“It has a slippery upper shape and a flat floor with a diffuser that gave it quite an edge in its day. The diffuser has an expansion ratio that puts it staggeringly close to the maximum downforce you can get from a diffuser. The car was at the tunnel with pressure tapings added to it, in order to look at the pressure distribution around the car which looks to completely confirm that it works exactly as the designer expected.”, explained Willem Toet. These tests were carried out with and without the "long tail" which was used for high-speed circuits, with the vehicle propelled by its own means, at working temperature, returning consistent and repeatable results.

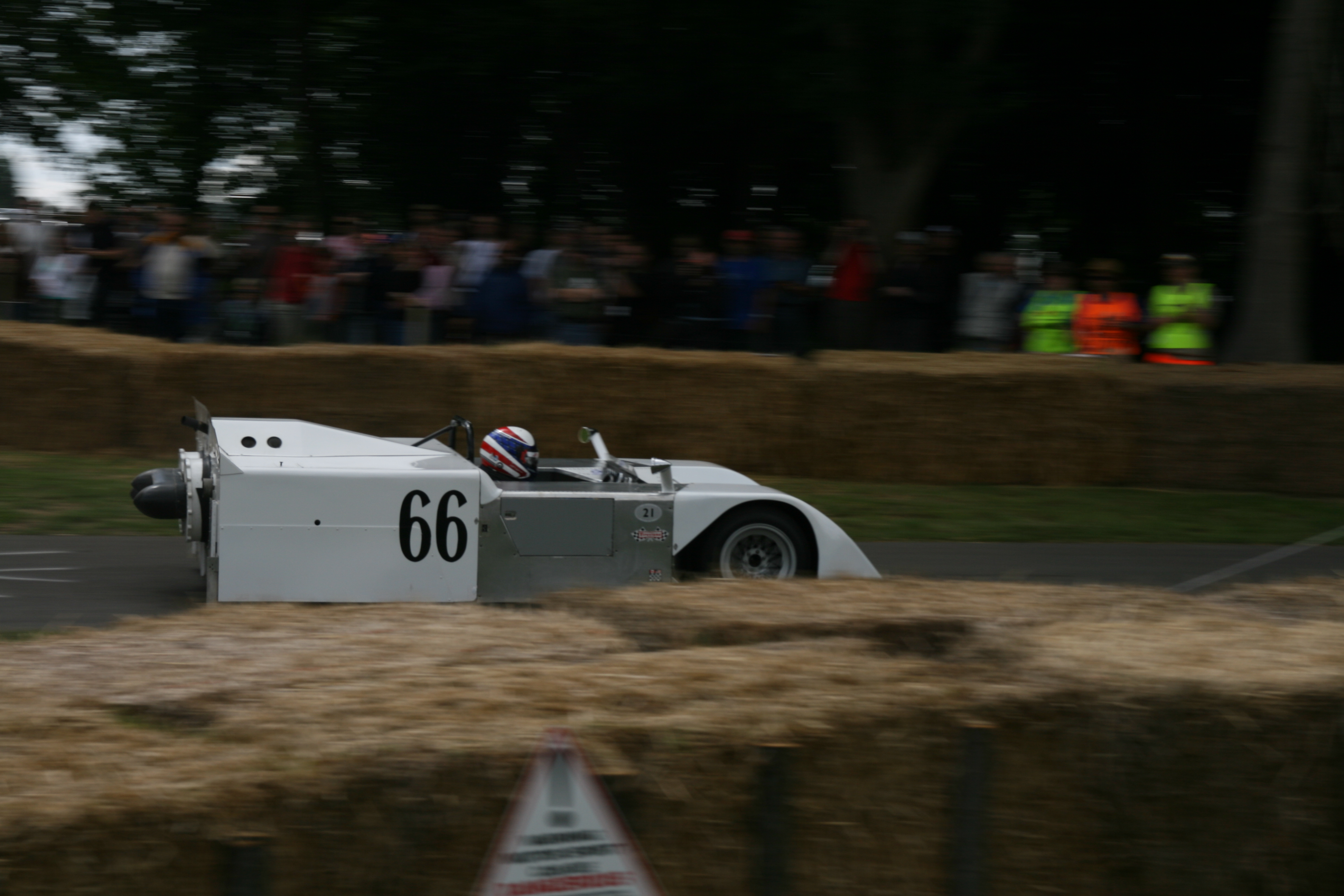
Chaparral 2J at Goodwood historic

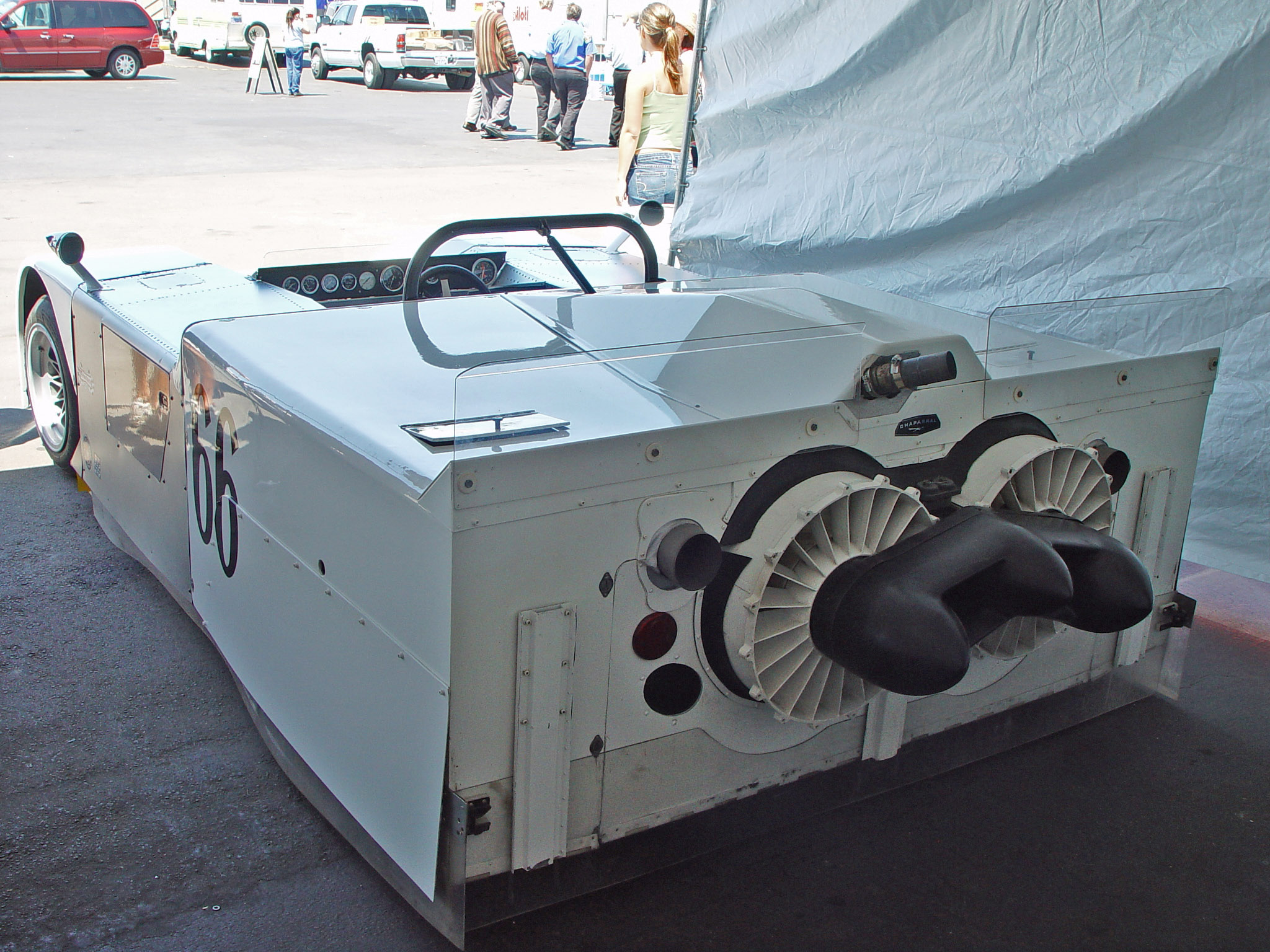
Rear of Chaparral 2J with large dual suction fan exhausts

Formula One was the next setting for ground effect in racing cars. Several Formula One designs came close to the ground-effect solution which would eventually be implemented by Lotus. In 1968 and 1969, Tony Rudd and Peter Wright at British Racing Motors (BRM) experimented on track and in the wind tunnel with long aerodynamic section side panniers to clean up the turbulent airflow between the front and rear wheels. Both left the team shortly after and the idea was not taken further. Robin Herd at March Engineering, on a suggestion from Wright, used a similar concept on the 1970 March Formula One car. In both cars the sidepods were too far away from the ground for significant ground effect to be generated, and the idea of sealing the space under the wing section to the ground had not yet been developed.

At about the same time, Shawn Buckley began his work in 1969 at the University of California, Berkeley on undercar aerodynamics sponsored by Colin Chapman, founder of Formula One Lotus. Buckley had previously designed the first high wing used in an IndyCar, Jerry Eisert's "Bat Car" of the 1966 Indianapolis 500. By proper shaping of the car's underside, the air speed there could be increased, lowering the pressure and pulling the car down onto the track. His test vehicles had a Venturi-like channel beneath the cars sealed by flexible side skirts that separated the channel from above-car aerodynamics. He investigated how flow separation on the undersurface channel could be influenced by boundary layer suction and divergence parameters of the underbody surface. Later, as a mechanical engineering professor at MIT, Buckley worked with Lotus developing the Lotus 78.

On a different tack, Brabham designer Gordon Murray used air dams at the front of his Brabham BT44s in 1974 to exclude air from flowing under the vehicle. Upon discovering that these tended to wear away with the pitching movement of the car, he placed them further back and discovered that a small area of negative pressure was formed under the car, generating a useful amount of downforce - around 70 kg (150 lb). McLaren produced similar underbody details for their McLaren M23 design.

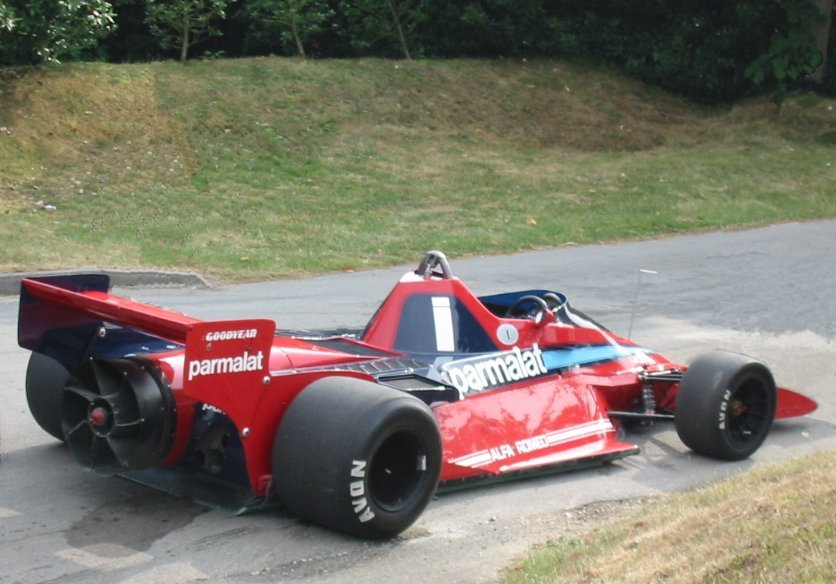
Brabham-Alfa's BT46B used a large fan to reduce underbody air pressure.

In 1977 Rudd and Wright, now at Lotus, developed the Lotus 78 'wing car', based on a concept from Lotus owner and designer Colin Chapman. Its sidepods, bulky constructions between front and rear wheels, were shaped as inverted aerofoils and sealed with flexible "skirts" to the ground. The design of the radiators, embedded into the sidepods, was partly based on that of the de Havilland Mosquito aircraft. The team won five races that year, and two in 1978 while they developed the much improved Lotus 79. The most notable contender in 1978 was the Brabham-Alfa Romeo BT46B Fancar, designed by Gordon Murray. Its fan, spinning on a horizontal, longitudinal axis at the back of the car, took its power from the main gearbox. The car avoided the sporting ban by claims that the fan's main purpose was for engine cooling, as less than 50% of the airflow was used to create a depression under the car. It raced just once, with Niki Lauda winning at the 1978 Swedish Grand Prix. The car's advantage was proven after the track became oily. While other cars had to slow, Lauda was able to accelerate over the oil due to the tremendous downforce which rose with engine speed. The car was also observed to squat when the engine was revved at a standstill. Brabham's owner, Bernie Ecclestone, who had recently become president of the Formula One Constructors Association, reached an agreement with other teams to withdraw the car after three races. However the Fédération Internationale de l'Automobile (FIA), governing body of Formula One and many other motorsport series, decided to ban 'fan cars' with almost immediate effect. The Lotus 79, on the other hand, went on to win six races and the world championship for Mario Andretti and gave teammate Ronnie Peterson a posthumous second place, demonstrating just how much of an advantage the cars had. In the following years other teams copied and improved on the Lotus until cornering speeds became dangerously high, resulting in several severe accidents in 1982; flat undersides became mandatory for 1983. Part of the danger of relying on ground effects to corner at high speeds is the possibility of the sudden removal of this force; if the underside of the car contacts the ground, the flow is constricted too much, resulting in almost total loss of any ground effects. If this occurs in a corner where the driver is relying on this force to stay on the track, its sudden removal can cause the car to abruptly lose most of its traction and skid off the track.

After a forty-year ban, ground effect returned to Formula 1 in 2022 under the latest set of regulation changes.

The effect was used in its most effective form in Indy car designs. Indy cars did not use ground effects as substantially as Formula One. For example, the use of skirts to seal off the underbody was banned in 1983. Indy cars also had a slightly higher ride height. They relied on wings for significant downforce as well, creating an effective balance between over-the-car downforce and ground effects.

== Porpoising ==
"Porpoising" is a term commonly used to describe a particular fault encountered in ground-effect racing cars. Racing cars had only been using their bodywork to generate downforce for just over a decade when Colin Chapman's Lotus 78 and 79 cars demonstrated that ground effect was the future in Formula One, so at this point under-car aerodynamics were still very poorly understood. To compound this problem, the teams that were very keen to pursue ground effects tended to be the more poorly funded British "garagista" teams, who had little money to spare for wind tunnel testing, and tended simply to mimic the front-running Lotuses (including the Kauhsen and Merzario teams).

This led to a generation of cars that were designed as much by hunch as by any great knowledge of the finer details, making them extremely pitch-sensitive. As the centre of pressure on the sidepod aerofoils moved about depending on the car's speed, attitude, and ground clearance, these forces interacted with the car's suspension systems, and the cars began to resonate, particularly at slow speeds, rocking back and forth—sometimes quite violently. Some drivers were known to complain of sea-sickness. This rocking motion, like a porpoise diving into and out of the sea as it swims at speed, gives the phenomenon its name. These characteristics, combined with a rock-hard suspension, resulted in the cars giving an extremely unpleasant ride. Ground effects were largely banned from Formula One in the early 1980s until 2022; however, Group C sportscars and other racing cars continued to suffer from porpoising until better knowledge of ground effects allowed designers to minimise the problem. At the first pre-season test in Barcelona ahead of the 2022 Formula One World Championship, George Russell said extreme porpoising could lead to safety issues and later stated he was suffering from chest pain due to such porpoising during the 2022 Emilia Romagna Grand Prix. At the 2022 Azerbaijan Grand Prix, Lewis Hamilton struggled to get out of the car after the race due to porpoising.

== See also ==
- Automotive aerodynamics
- Formula One car
- Ground effect in aircraft
- Ground-effect train
- Venturi effect
