= Víctor Rosso =

Argentine international racing driver (born 1960)

Víctor Rubén Rosso
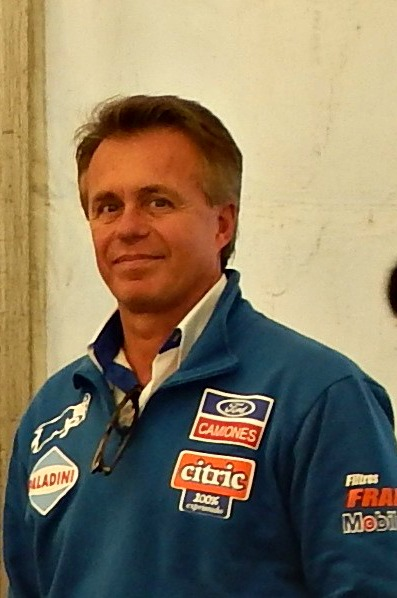
- Born: 16 October 1960 (age 65); Marcos Juárez, Córdoba Province, Argentina
- Occupation: Team Principal of RAM Racing

Victor Rubén Rosso (born 1960) is an Argentine international racing driver who competed in motorsports from 1978 to 2012. He has continued to be involved in motor sports as a Team Principal.

== Early and personal life ==
Rosso was born in Marco Juarez, Argentina on 16 October 1960 where his mother called him Vichín. In 1973, he had his first experience in the sport with kart racing. In subsequent years, Rosso gained more experience by racing in different categories of karting. In 1982, Rosso moved to Europe because of the Falklands War.

== Career ==
In 1978, at age 18, Rosso made his racing debut in Fórmula Renaut (previously Fórmula 4). Two years later, he became the first champion of the division and the youngest driver to win a national title. From 1975 to 2002, Rosso raced in Argentina, England, Germany, and Japan. He once competed against Ayrton Senna of Brazil and won pole positions over him at Mallory Park and Brands Hatch.

After several years as driver, Rosso retired in order to create his own racing team. As the Team Principal, he entered the Formula 3, rally and TC2000 formats. His new professional racing team included Dario and Gustavo Ramonda, Jorge Recalde, Pablo Peón and Luis Soppelsa. In 1994, he entered the Formula 3 Sudamericana and was the runner-up with Omar Martinez. In 1995, 1996 and 1997, Rosso entered the South American Formula 3 Championship and the National Rally Championship (with a team called Pro Rally). Rosso was the first Team Principal to enter an imported care in the TC2000. Rosso won four drivers' titles in the TC 2000: with Omar Martinez (1998), with Juan Manuel Silva (1999) and with José María "Pechito" Lopez (2008, 2009.)

Since 2002, Rosso has worked with racing teams in the role of Team Principal and has taken part in different motorsport events such as Rally Master. From 1996 to 2011, Rosso worked as the Team Principal for Honda Racing in TC 2000, winning four drivers' titles and six manufacturer championships. The Honda Civic has a record 92 wins in the TC2000. In the Argentine car market it is considered to be at the same level as Ford, Chevrolet and Renault.

Between 1998 and 2010, Rosso won six manufacturer championships (1998, 1999, 2003, 2008, 2009, and 2010). Then, in 2012, he became the Team Principal of Renault in Súper TC2000 and won the manufacturers championship, which was the team's first title in 19 years. Rosso's legacy is seen in staff of the official teams of the Super TC2000 (Peugeot, Fiat, Chevrolet, Toyota, Renault) being drawn from his Víctor Rubén Rosso structure.

== Driver career ==
=== 1980s ===
In 1980, Rosso won his first championship in the Argentina Renault Formula. This was one year after Renault had fielded a local team. In 1981, he competed in the British Marlboro Formula 3 championships with, for the first time, a full Argentinian team. He also competed in the European Formula 3 at Silverstone. In 1982, Rosso competed in eight races in the British Formula Ford 2000 and he won twice at Brands Hatch. He also competed twice at the European Championship and won one race in Hockenheim, Germany. Rosso was then the runner up at Donington Park in the 1983 Radio Trent competition. The following year, he was the Superguard champion at Donington.

In 1985, Rosso became the German Formula Ford 2000 champion and in 1986, he placed third in the German Formula 3 competition as part of the Dallara automobile company team. He also competed in the Formula 3 Macau GP. In 1987, Rosso returned to the German Formula 3 as part of the official Volkswagen team. He also drove in the Formula 3 EFDA Euroseries, winning at the Nürburgring, Germany. He finished the series in the runner up position.

In 1988, Rosso aimed to lead a team to race in Germany with a one hundred percent Argentine made car. It was the first Argentine carbon fiber car. The engine was the 088 Berta F3. For this challenge, Rosso worked with the Córdoba military aircraft factory and the engine preparer, Oreste Berta. Rosso did compete but could not complete the season due to financial problems. In the last year of the decade, Rosso drove in the German Formula 3 in a Russian-German EUFRA project team under the direction of Franz Tost.

=== 1990s ===
In 1990, Rosso placed fourth in the Fuji World Cup. In 1990 and 1991, he competed in the Japan Formula 3, placing fourth in 1991. In 1990, 1991 and 1992, he drove with the Tom's Toyota official team in a Toyota Corolla for the Tourism Group "A". Rosso competed in two races of the TC2000 in Argentina in 1993 and again was part of Tom's Toyota. Rosso's driver for the South American and Argentine rally competitions in 1995 was Jorge Recalde.

In 1996, for the first time, Rosso presented a project to Honda to compete the TC2000 in Argentina. He entered the TC2000 again in 1997 with Honda (a notable event for the imported brand) and won. Rosso won the TC2000 again with Honda and Omar Martinez in 1998 and with Juan Manuel Silva in 1999.

1999 was the year of construction of Pro Racing's high-tech garages to accommodate different brands as well as the Córdoba Racing Research Model Workshop used for the preparation of high competition cars. Pro Racing opened a rally circuit in December 1999. It was used for Rally Master Argentina in 1999 and 2000 and several times for the WRC Rally Argentina Super Special Stage.

The drivers invited to come to the circuit included Markku Alen, Miki Biasion, Stig Blomqvist, Timo Salonen, Ari Vatanen, Jorge Recalde, Gabriel Raies, Gustavo Trelles, Jimmy McRae, Alister McRae, Bruno Thiry, Uwe Nittel, Manfred Stohl, Giggi Galli, Miguel Campos, and Jani Paasonen.

=== 2000s ===
In each year of the 2000s, Rosso entered the TC2000 with Honda. In 2000 he had two pole positions and two wins; in 2001, one pole position and one win; and in 2002, five pole positions and 4 wins. In 2003, Rosso won the TC2000 manufacturers championship with Honda. In 2004, Rosso had seven pole positions and two wins; in 2005, two wins; in 2006, two pole positions and five wins; and in 2007, nine pole positions and five wins. In 2008, Rosso was the winner of the TC2000 manufacturer championship with Honda Racing and the drivers' championship with José María López.

Despite his winning the 2008 competition with José María "Pechito" Lopez, Honda retired from the TC2000 as they disagreed with new engine regulations. As a result, from 2009 to 2011, the team's name was changed to Team Petrobras. In 2009, Rosso won the TC2000 manufacturer championship with Honda Racing and also the driver's championship with José María López.

=== 2010s ===
Rosso and Felipe McGough were involved with the January 22, 2010 event where José María López was confirmed as one of the drivers of the new USF1 Formula 1 Team, led by the journalist Peter Windsor. Three days later, López and Windsor were received by President Cristina Fernandez de Kirchner at the Argentine Government House. Argentina was to pay twenty-five percent of the $8 million required by the US team. However, in the end, the USF1 team did not compete in Formula 1 due to problems in development and withdrawal of the financial support from YouTube co-founder Chad Hurley.

In 2010, Rosso again won the TC2000 manufacturer championship with Honda Racing. In 2011, he won one pole position and had one win. In 2012, Rosso was engaged by Renault to represent the brand in the super TC2000 championship with a team called Racecraft. In this year, he was the winner of the TC2000 manufacturer championship with the Renault LoJack Team. In 2013, Rosso was the runner up with the Renault LoJack Team in the TC2000 manufacturer championship and also the runner up in the driver's championship with Leonel Pernia.

Also in 2013, Rosso attended the FIA meetings at Paris with William de Braekeleer to represent the interests of Honda and establishing the rules for the 2014 World Touring Car Championship. Honda Argentina quit the project because of internal changes but Honda Europe and Honda Japan continued.
