= Formula Two Codasur =

- Category: Single seaters
- Country: South America
- Inaugural season: 1983
- Folded: 1986
- Constructors: Berta, Muffatão and others
- Engine suppliers: Volkswagen, Renault, Fiat, Ford and others
- Tyre suppliers: Pirelli and others
- Last Drivers' champion: (Argentina) Guillermo Maldonado (four times)

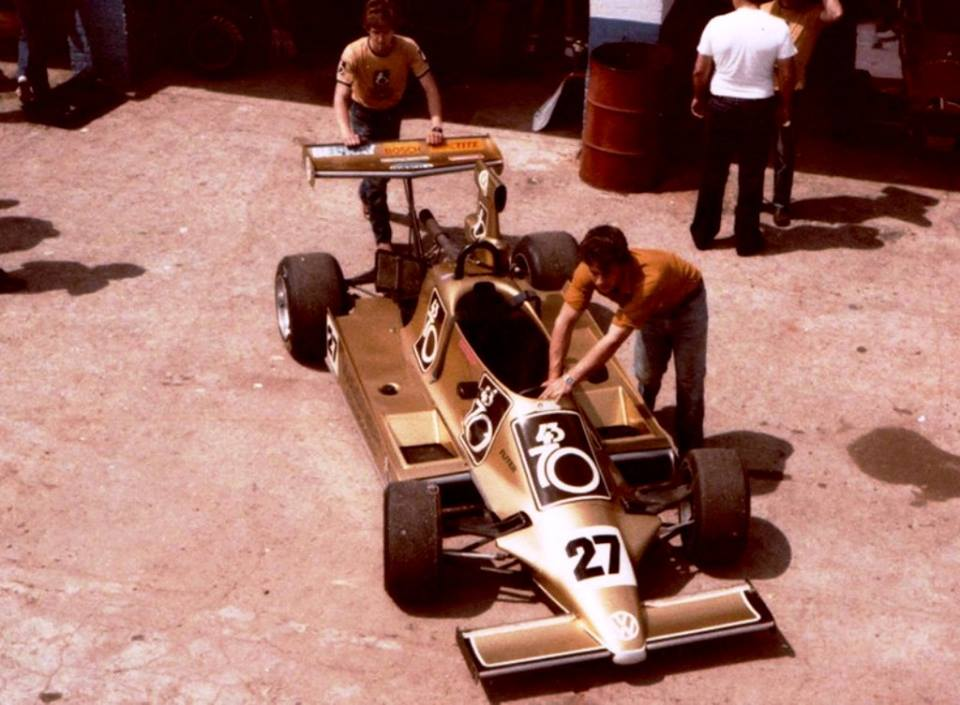
Berta-VW car.

Formula Two Codasur, or South American Formula Two Championship, was a Formula Two championship organized by the Confederación Deportiva Automovilística Sudamericana (CODASUR) held in South America between 1983 and 1986. This series only had one champion in its four championships: Guillermo Maldonado (Berta-Volkswagen).

CODASUR decided to unify the national Formula Two championships of Argentina (which was already about 20 years old) and Brazil (created in 1980 from the remnants of Formula Super Vee), and thus the South American championship was born in 1983, which visited circuits in Argentina, Brazil, Chile, Uruguay and other countries. In 1982, two test events were held in Tarumã (Brazil) and Buenos Aires. This series was replaced in 1987 by the South American Formula Three, introducing exported chassis.

The cars were local chassis, equipped with engines from different manufacturers, for example Volkswagen and Renault. The most successful chassis were those of the Argentine engineer Oreste Berta. Maldonado won all championships with Berta chassis equipped with 1800 cc L4 engines based on the Volkswagen 1500 (Hillman Avenger) engine.

== Champions ==
Year	Driver	Car
1983	(Argentina) Guillermo Maldonado	Berta-Volkswagen
1984	(Argentina) Guillermo Maldonado	Berta-Volkswagen
1985	(Argentina) Guillermo Maldonado	Berta-Volkswagen
1986	(Argentina) Guillermo Maldonado	Berta-Volkswagen
