= Guillermo Maldonado (racing driver) =

Argentine racing driver

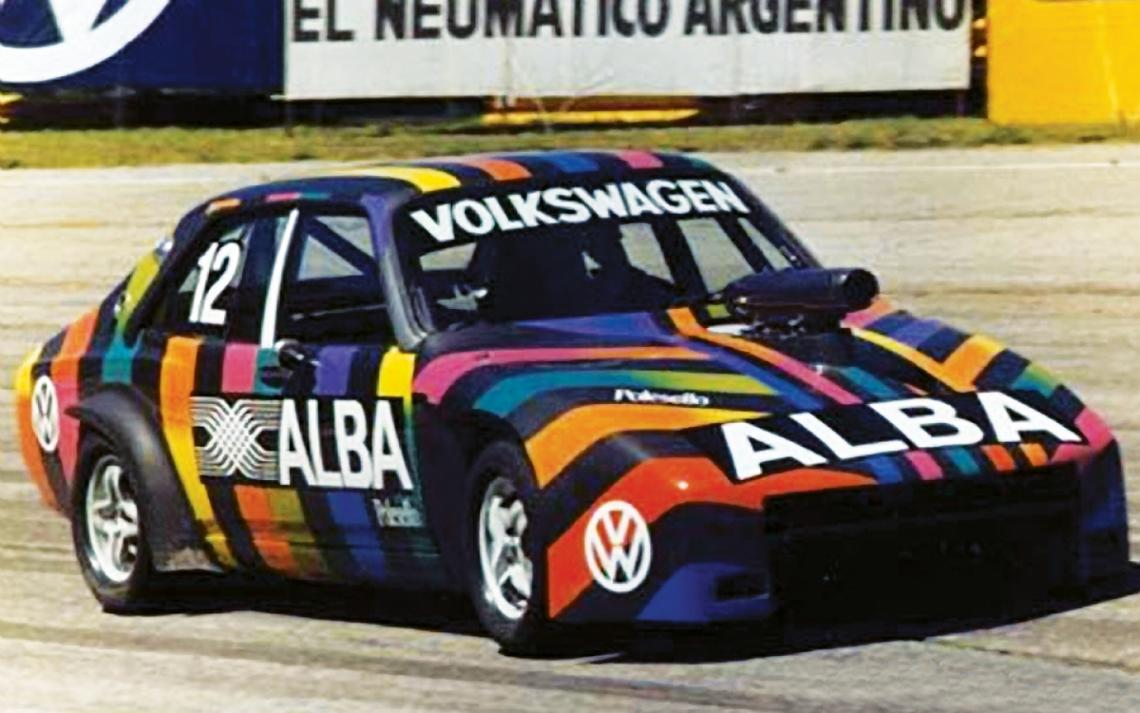
Guillermo Maldonado in a Volkswagen, 1988.

Guillermo Fausto Maldonado (born October 29, 1952, in Buenos Aires Province), is an Argentine racing driver. He started his career in the late 70s and retired after 1996.

Maldonado won the Fórmula Two Argentina championship 1980 and 1982, the four editions of the Formula Two Codasur championship (from 1983 to 1986) and the TC2000 championship in 1994. He also raced at the 1983 24 Hours of Daytona.

Sporting positions
Preceded by Juan María Traverso	TC2000 champion 1994	Succeeded by Juan María Traverso
