= Oreste Berta =

Argentinian auto mechanic and automotive designer

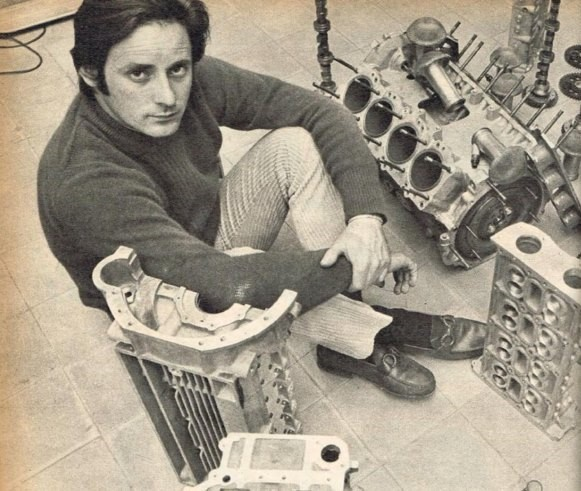
Oreste Berta in 1971

Oreste Berta (born 29 September 1938 in Rafaela, Argentina) is an Argentinian engineer who has built and entered racing cars in various championships since the 1960s. He founded his own engineering company in Alta Gracia, and ran a successful racing team in the Turismo Carretera championship. After his two sons took over, they continued the success in TC2000 Championship in collaboration with Ford. Berta entered two Formula One Grands Prix in 1975 but withdrew from both after failing to build a reliable engine.

== Touring car racing ==
In 1966 the Argentinian automobile manufacturer Industrias Kaiser Argentina (IKA) entered the Turismo Carretera, a popular touring car racing championship in Argentina, with their Torino model. Technician Oreste Berta was hired as team leader. Together with coachbuilder Heriberto Pronello, he developed a streamlined version of the Torino model. Driver Eduardo Copello won the 1967 championship, marking the first time that another manufacturer than Ford and Chevrolet won. The team also took home the trophy from 1969 to 1971.

To break ground in international racing, Oreste Berta entered the 1969 Marathon de la Route (also known as the Nürburgring 84 Hours and 'The World's Longest Motor Race') with three IKA Torino's. The team was supported by five-time Formula 1 champion Juan Manuel Fangio. The three cars qualified in the first three positions, but just one car finished, in fourth position.

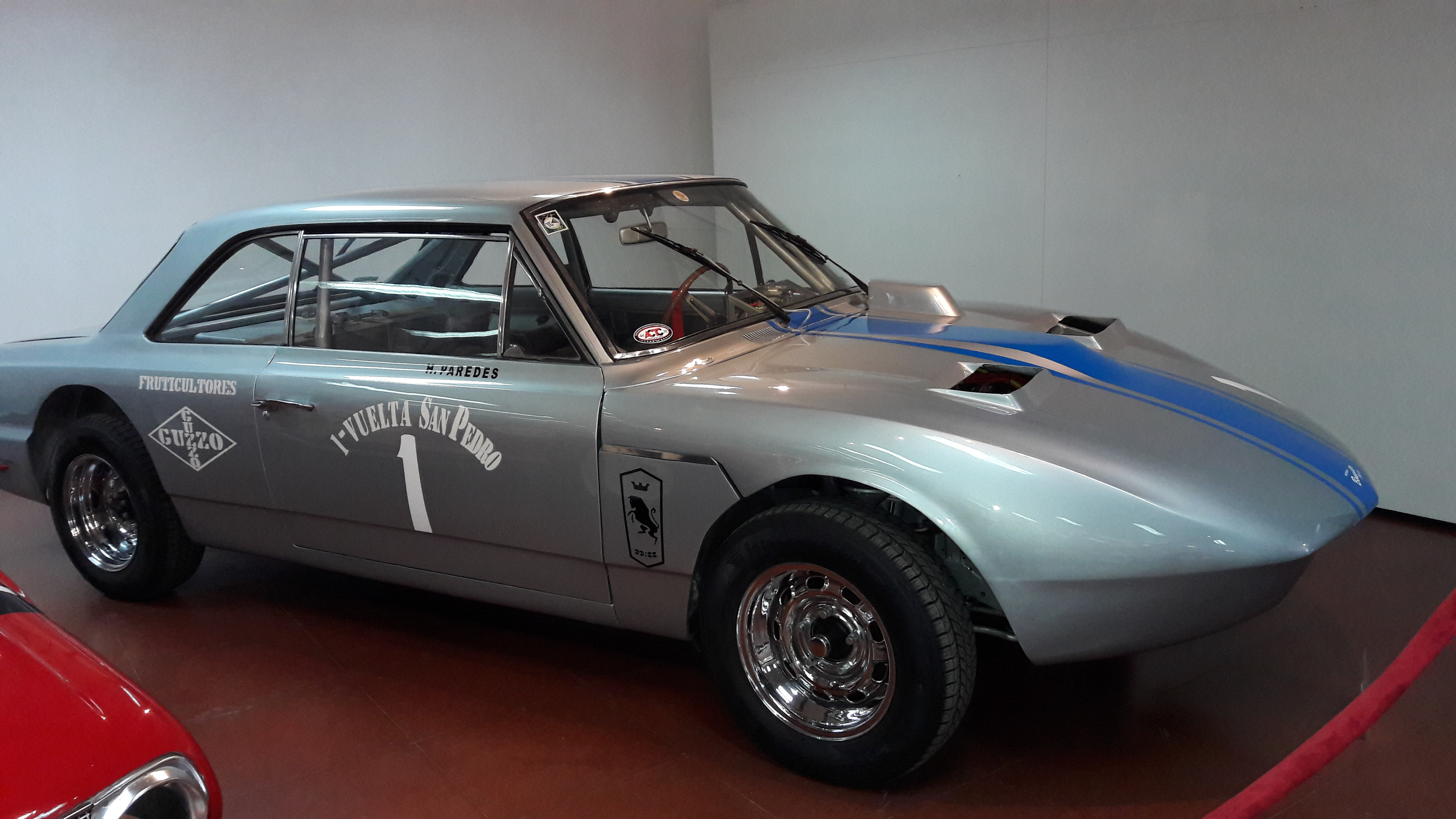
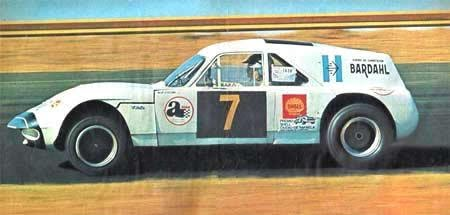
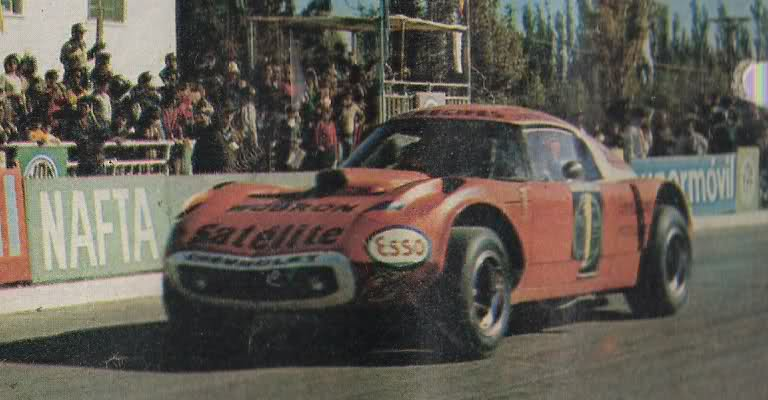
Liebre Torino Mk I, II and III developed by Berta

From 1985 to 1995 Berta participated in the TC2000 Championship with a line-up of Renault Fuego's. They won the championship 7 times in 11 years with drivers Juan María Traverso and Miguel Ángel Guerra.

In 1997 Berta started a collaboration with Ford and, leading the team together with his son Oreste Jr., went on to win the championship 5 more times in the next 13 years. Their most notable driver of the time was Gabriel Ponce de León.

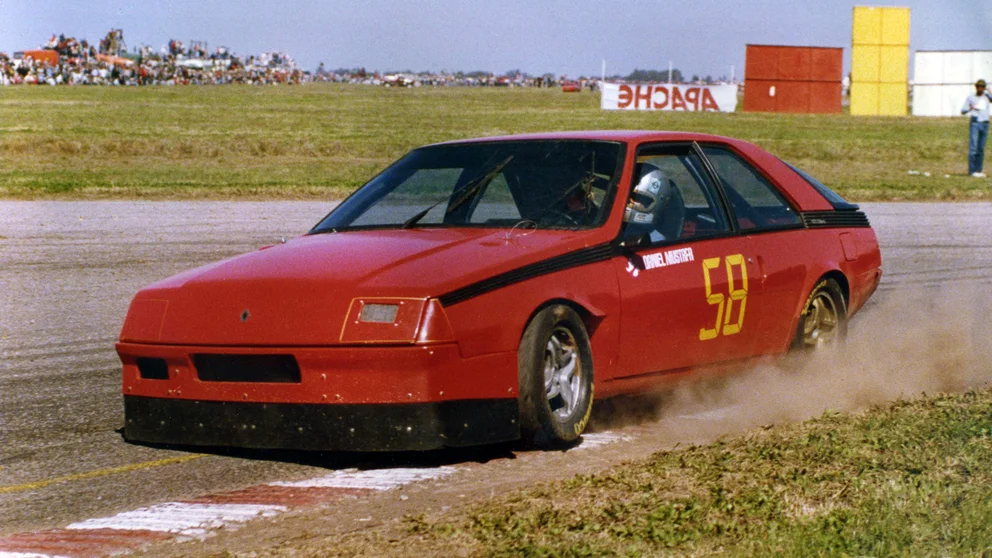
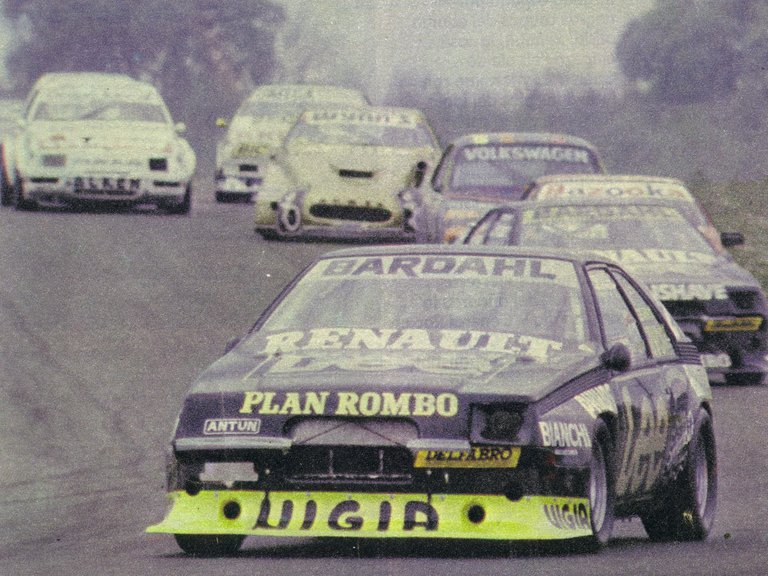
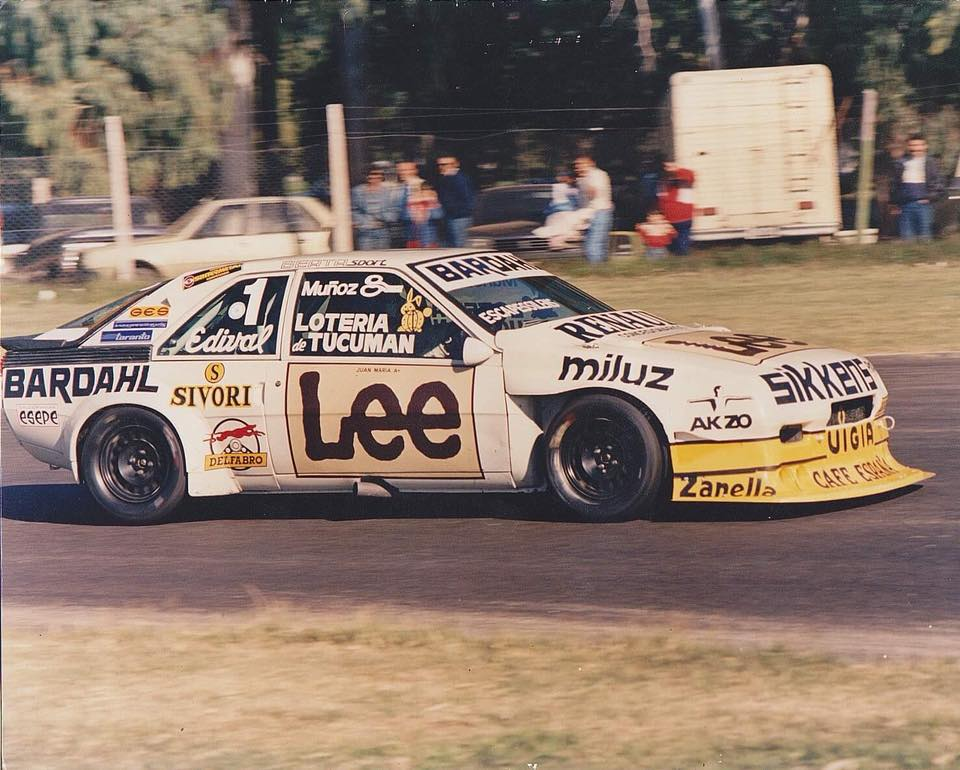
Berta Motorsport cars in the TC2000 championship (from left to right: 1985, 1988, 1989, 1990 and 1997)

== Sports car racing ==
After their semi-successful partnership in 1969, Juan Manuel Fangio opted to build an all-Argentinian car to race in the 1970 1,000 km of Buenos Aires. The plan was supported financially by Patricio Peralta Ramos, CEO of the newspaper La Razón, which led Berta to name the new car the Berta LR. The team qualified in third place with drivers Carlos Marincovich and Luis Rubén di Palma but suffered engine troubles during the race. They decided to withdraw after 28 laps to save the engine. In the 200 Miles of Buenos Aires, just one week later, they finished second. This earned them an invitation to the 1,000 km of the Nürburgring, but with a 14th place qualifying and a retirement after six laps, they were unable to repeat the success.

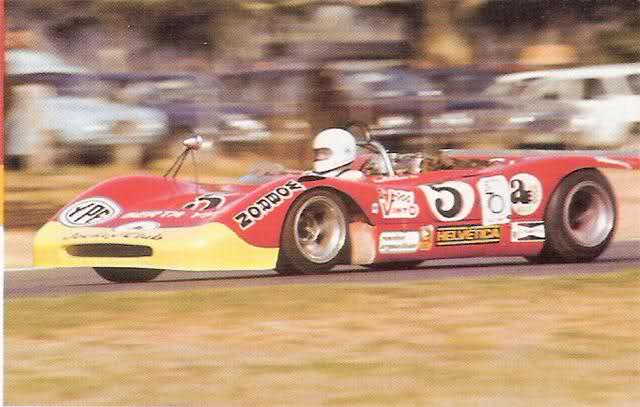
1972 Berta LR

Problems with the Cosworth engine and the self-produced bodywork continued in 1971 and did not fade when Berta developed his own engine in 1972. For 1973, Berta tried to get financial support from the Argentine government, but was unable to do so.

In 1974 Berta finally adapted the LR for the Brazilian Sports Car Championship together with designer Anísio Campos and racing driver Luiz Bueno, both working for Porsche before the manufacturer left. The LR received an engine from a Ford Maverick and was entered in the 1975 Division 4 championship. Although most of the races did not go smoothly, the car was way more powerful than the competition, breaking multiple track records and winning the Class B championship.

== Formula One ==
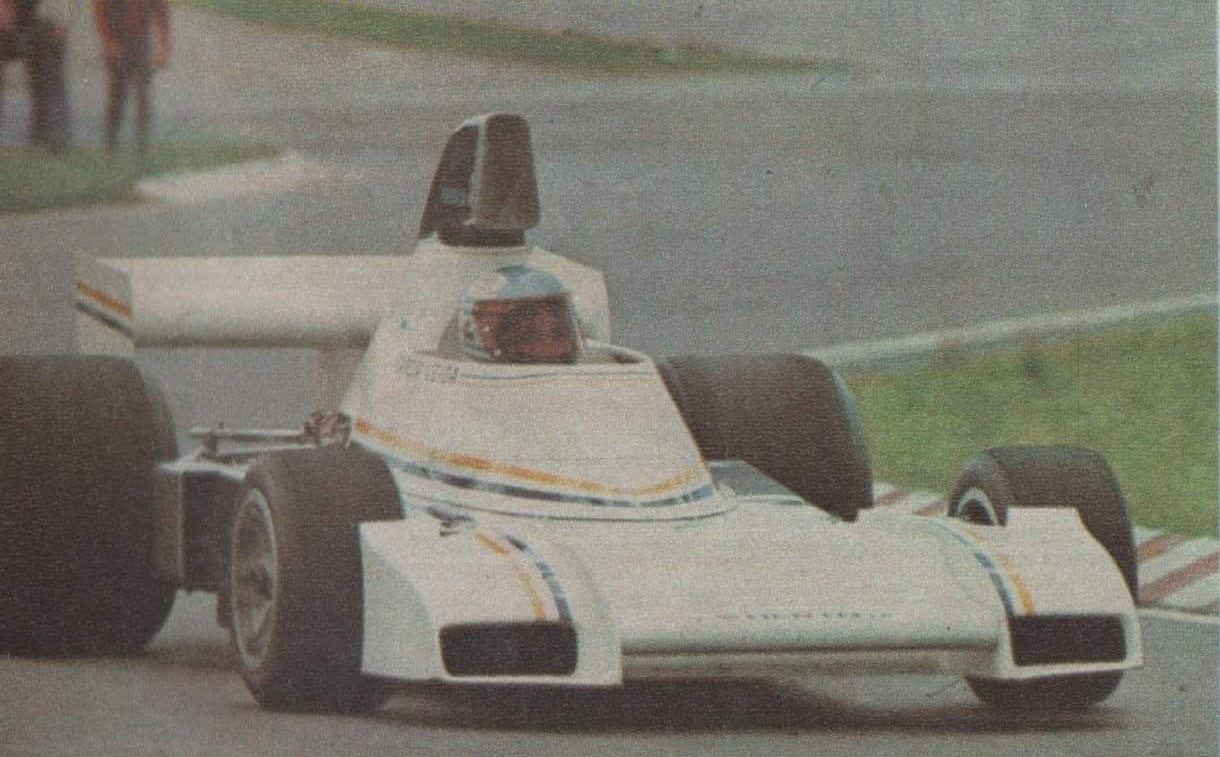
Veiga testing the Berta F1

In December 1974 Oreste Berta built an F1 chassis, based on his Formula 5000 car that raced in the United States without success. He also designed and produced his own engine. However, during a test session at the Autódromo Oscar y Juan Gálvez, with Nestor García-Veiga at the wheel, all four engines blew up. Berta entered the first two races of the 1975 Formula One season, remembering an offer from Wilson Fittipaldi to loan his Cosworth DFV engine. However, he decided against racing when Fittipaldi demanded the engine should be returned as new.

== Formula Two and Three ==
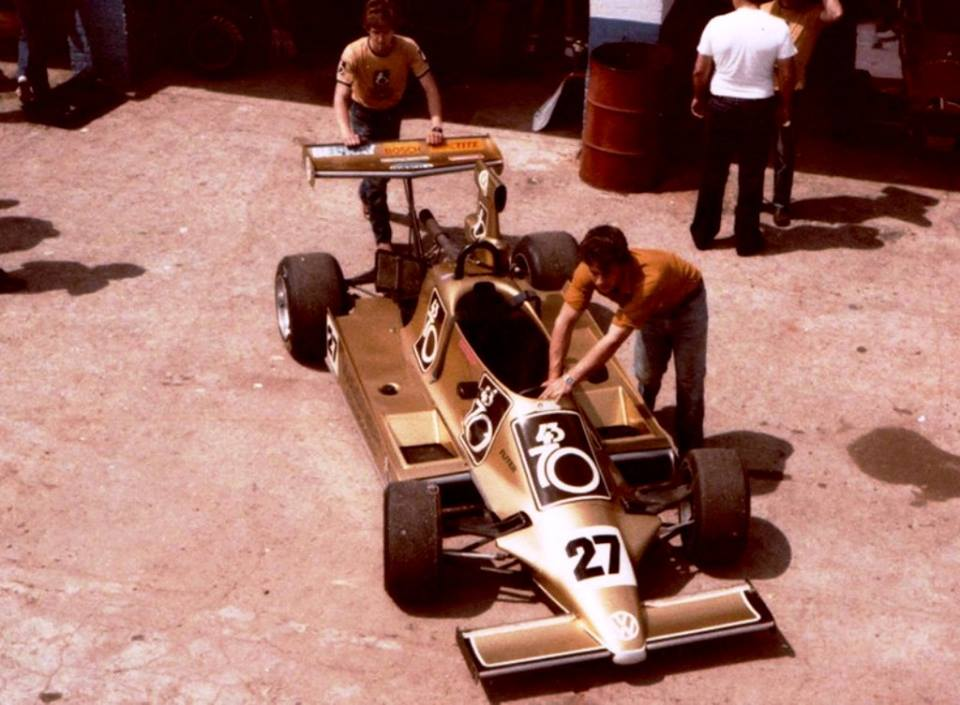
One of the Berta-VW cars in the F2 Codasur series

In 1980 Berta collaborated with Guillermo Maldonado and entered the Argentine Formula Two championship. With the support of Volkswagen Argentina, they combined a Berta chassis with a Volkswagen engine to create the 'Berta-VW' and they won the championship at least one time. When in 1983 the Argentinian and Brazilian Formula Two series were merged to form the South American Formula Two Championship, Berta supplied almost all vehicles and Maldonado won every championship until the cancellation of the series in 1986. The series evolved into the Formula 3 Sudamericana championship and Berta supplied a standardised chassis based to all teams. The organisers quickly opened up to other suppliers and eventually favoured Dallara as the de facto choice, but the Berta company produced all the engines until the series' eventual demise in 2017.

In 1988 Berta built a Renault-powered chassis together with Marc Hessel to race in the German Formula 3 Championship, but their driver Victor Rosso was unable to finish higher than in the midfield.

== Company ==
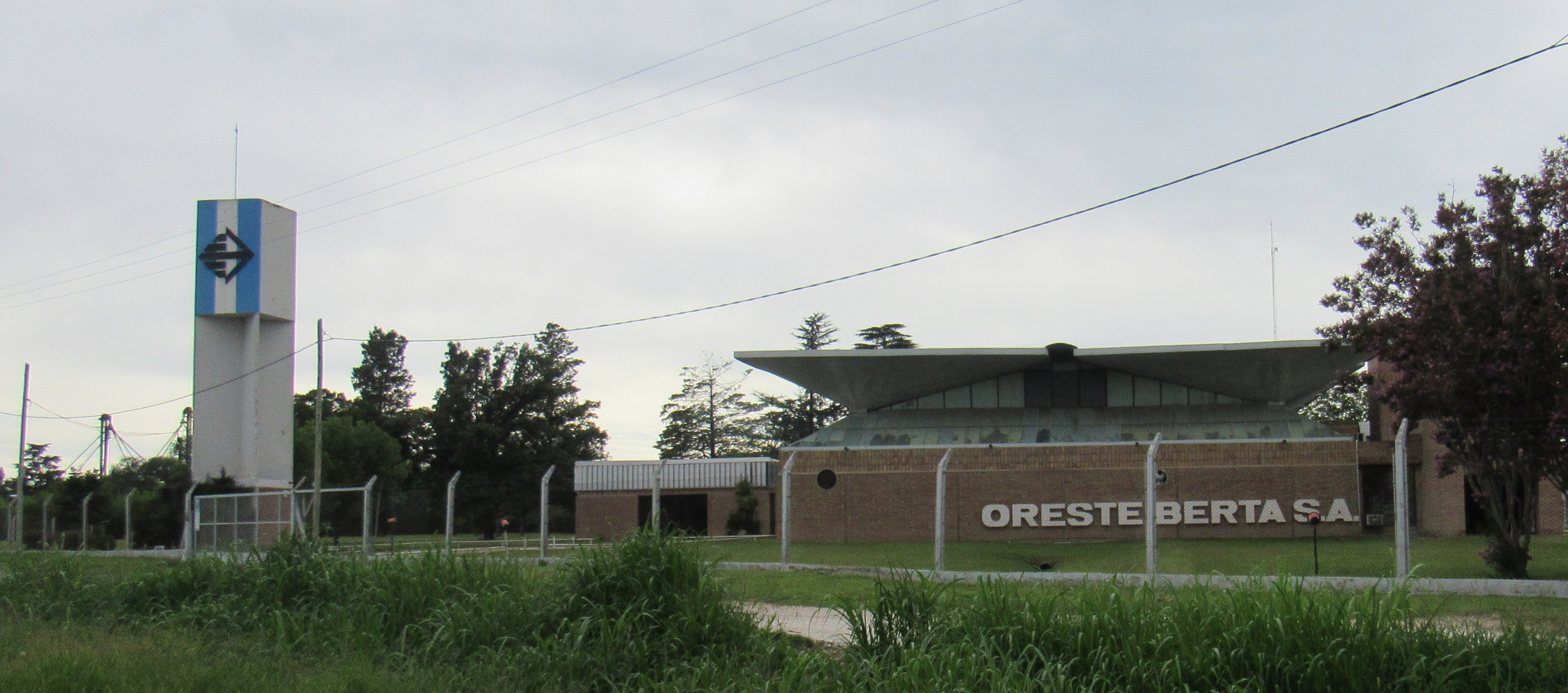
The entrance to Oreste Berta S.A.

The company Oreste Berta S.A. is located in Alta Gracia and owns a test track. It is considered an important center for developing and testing cars, and for training young racing drivers.
