= Villa Nueva, Córdoba =

Villa Nueva
- Town
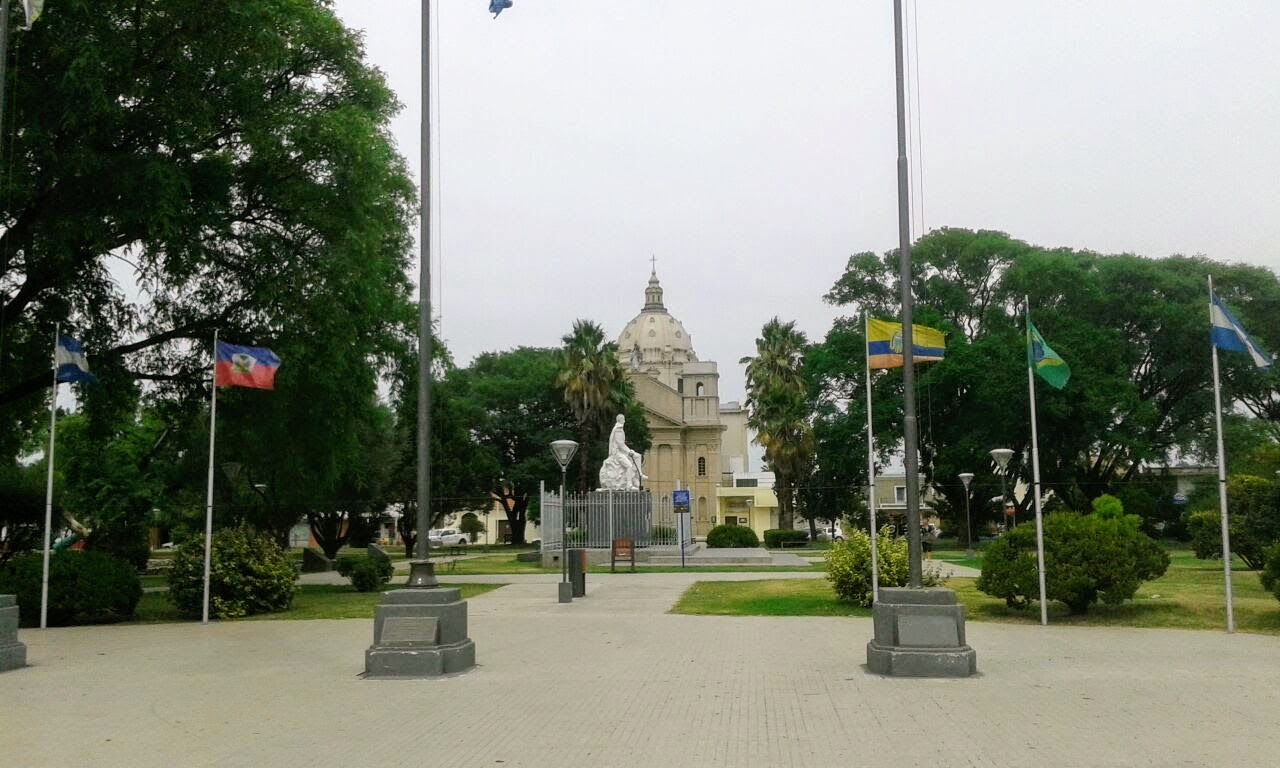

- Location within Córdoba Province Location within Argentina
- Coordinates: 32°25′59″S 63°14′51″W
- Country: Argentina
- Province: Córdoba
- Department: General San Martín
- Foundation: 7 October 1826

Government
  - Intendant: Ignacio Tagni
- Elevation: 194 m (636 ft)

Population (2010)
  - Total: 18,818
- Time zone: UTC−3 (ART)

Villa Nueva is a town located in the General San Martín Department in the Province of Córdoba in central Argentina.
