= IKA-Renault Torino =

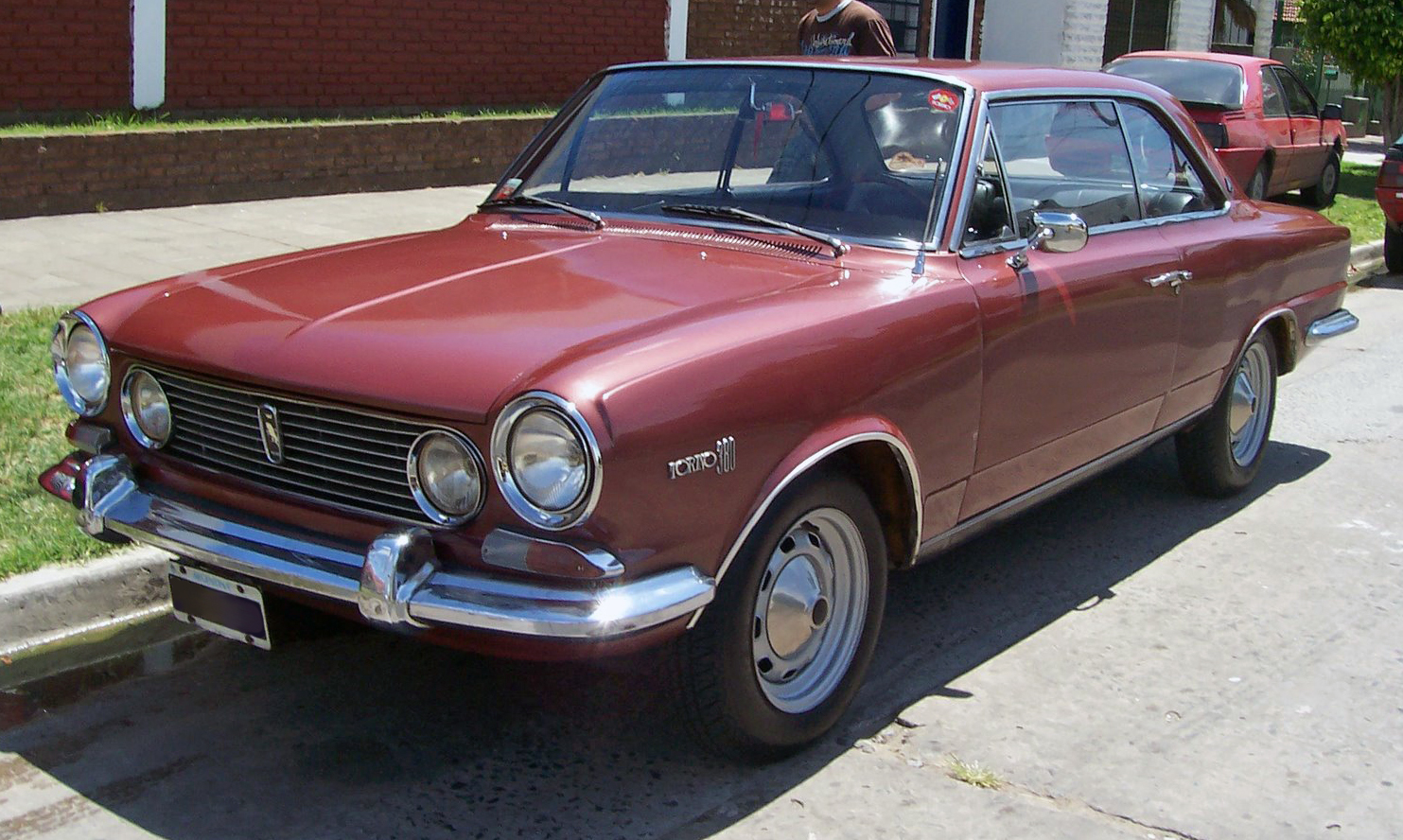
- IKA Torino 380 coupé (1966–1970)

Overview
- Manufacturer: IKA (1966–1975); Renault Argentina (1975–1981)
- Production: 1966–1981
- Assembly: Argentina: Santa Isabel, Córdoba
- Designer: Dick Teague and Pininfarina

Body and chassis
- Class: Mid-size
- Body style: 2-door hardtop coupé 4-door sedan
- Layout: FR layout
- Related: Rambler American (third generation)

Powertrain
- Engine: 2968 cc Tornado Special I6; 3770 cc Tornado Interceptor I6; 3770 cc Torino 233 I6; 3950 cc Tornado Interceptor 241 I6
- Transmission: 4-speed ZF manual

Dimensions
- Wheelbase: 107.2 in (2,723 mm)
- Length: 4,724 mm (186.0 in)
- Width: 1,798 mm (70.8 in)
- Height: 1,410 mm (55.5 in)
- Curb weight: 1,060–1,471 kg (2,337–3,243 lb)

The IKA Torino, later renamed as the Renault Torino, is a mid-sized automobile made by Industrias Kaiser Argentina (IKA) between 1966 and 1981, under an agreement with American Motors Corporation (AMC). The 1966 Torino was IKA's first national product. IKA was eventually bought out by Renault in 1975 to form Renault Argentina S.A.

The Torino was built on the same hybrid AMC platform through 1981 in both two-door hardtop and four-door sedan variants. It has been described as "Argentina's national car".

== Background ==
In 1961, IKA (Industrias Kaiser Argentina) was looking for a car that could break into the Argentinian market, a car that could combine American reliability with European elegance. The automaker provided two 1965 Rambler Americans (a coupe hardtop and a sedan) to Pininfarina seeking styling updates. The new design largely maintained the general shape of the original Rambler with a completely new interior and facelifted "European" grille and rear end.

The car was presented on 30 November 1966, at the Autódromo Juan y Oscar Gálvez racing circuit, and was marketed as the quintessential Argentinian car. The Torino proved popular throughout the 1960s and the 1970s. It continued to be produced after IKA was bought out by Renault.

Renault continued the production until the early 1980s. In 1978, the Argentinian automobile market began to slow down considerably. This coincided with the relaxation of trade restrictions and the introduction of foreign-made cars. The Torino was unable to compete with the newer, cheaper, more reliable foreign models. Production of the Torino line ended in 1982.

A total of 99,792 two and four-door IKA Torinos were built.

== Engines ==
All engines were manufactured in Argentina.

Tornado Special engine is only available on the 300 (the 300S is the 4-door version of the 300). It has four main bearings.

Tornado Special engine
Model	Engine			Power	Torque
Model	Disp.	Bore x Stroke	Redline	Power	Torque
300 & 300S	2968 cc	84.94 mm × 87.31 mm 3.344 in × 3.437 in	5,000 rpm	120 hp (89 kW; 122 PS) @ 4,500 rpm	26 kg⋅m (188 lb⋅ft; 255 N⋅m) @ 3,000 rpm

Tornado Interceptor engine. Available models: 380, 380W, TS, SE, GS200. It has 4 main bearings. The 380S is the 4-door version of the 380. The 'W' in 380W is for the 3 Weber 45 Dcoe 17 carburetors. The TS/S is the 4-door version of the TS. The GS200 replaced the 380W and was the first Argentine car to be able to exceed 200 km/h (124 mph), with a top speed of 203 km/h (126 mph).

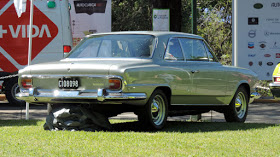
Rear view

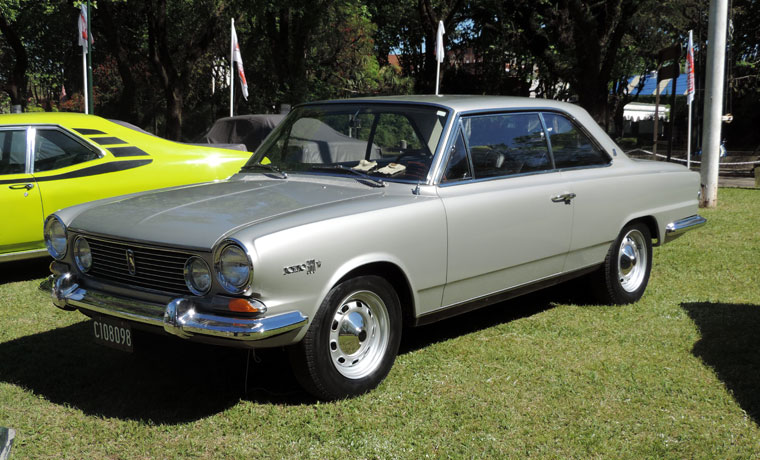
1967 IKA Torino 380 W, the top version between 1966 and 1970. The body has the basic shape of the 1965 Rambler American 2-door hardtop

Tornado Special engine
Model	Engine			Power	Torque
Model	Disp.	Bore x Stroke	Redline	Power	Torque
380 & 380S	3770 cc	84.94 mm × 111.125 mm 3.3441 in × 4.3750 in	5,000 rpm	155 hp (116 kW; 157 PS) @ 4,300 rpm	32 kg⋅m (231 lb⋅ft; 314 N⋅m) @ 3,500 rpm
380W	3770 cc	84.94 mm × 111.125 mm 3.3441 in × 4.3750 in	5,000 rpm	176 hp (131 kW; 178 PS) @ 4,500 rpm	33 kg⋅m (239 lb⋅ft; 324 N⋅m) @ 3,500 rpm
TS	3770 cc	84.94 mm × 111.125 mm 3.3441 in × 4.3750 in	5,000 rpm	160 hp (119 kW; 162 PS) @ 4,500 rpm	31 kg⋅m (224 lb⋅ft; 304 N⋅m) @ 2,500 rpm
TS/S	3770 cc	84.94 mm × 111.125 mm 3.3441 in × 4.3750 in	5,000 rpm	152 hp (113 kW; 154 PS) @ 4,200 rpm	30 kg⋅m (217 lb⋅ft; 294 N⋅m) @ 2,500 rpm
GS200	3770 cc	84.94 mm × 111.125 mm 3.3441 in × 4.3750 in	5,000 rpm	185 hp (138 kW; 188 PS) @ 4,700 rpm	34 kg⋅m (246 lb⋅ft; 333 N⋅m) @ 3,500 rpm

1972 Renault Torino

The Torino 233 engine features a new block and a new cylinder head. Available models: SE, GR, TS, TSX, GS, ZX. It has 7 main bearings. Power and torque figures for the GS are estimated.

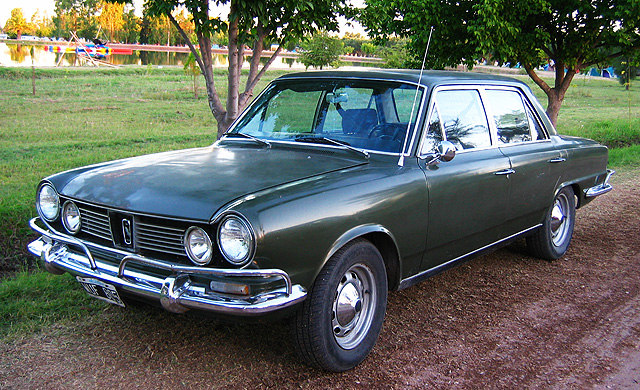
IKA Torino TS sedan

Torino 233 engine
Model	Engine			Power	Torque
Model	Disp.	Bore x Stroke	Redline	Power	Torque
SE (4-door)	3770 cc	84.94 mm × 111.125 mm 3.3441 in × 4.3750 in	5,200 rpm	170 hp (127 kW; 172 PS) @ 4,500 rpm	31 kg⋅m (224 lb⋅ft; 304 N⋅m) @ 2,500 rpm
GR (4-door) & TS	3770 cc	84.94 mm × 111.125 mm 3.3441 in × 4.3750 in	5,200 rpm	180 hp (134 kW; 182 PS) @ 4,500 rpm	31 kg⋅m (224 lb⋅ft; 304 N⋅m) @ 2,500 rpm
TSX & ZX	3770 cc	84.94 mm × 111.125 mm 3.3441 in × 4.3750 in	5,200 rpm	200 hp (149 kW; 203 PS) @ 4,500 rpm	33 kg⋅m (239 lb⋅ft; 324 N⋅m) @ 3,000 rpm
GS	3770 cc	84.94 mm × 111.125 mm 3.3441 in × 4.3750 in	5,200 rpm	215 hp (160 kW; 218 PS) @ 4,700 rpm	34 kg⋅m (246 lb⋅ft; 333 N⋅m) @ 3,200 rpm

The Tornado Interceptor 241 engine prepared for use in competition. Available in the Torino 380W TC. It has 4 main bearings.

Tornado Interceptor 241 engine
Model	Engine			Power	Torque
Model	Disp.	Bore x Stroke	Redline	Power	Torque
380W TC	3950 cc	86.70 mm × 111.125 mm 3.4134 in × 4.3750 in	5,400 rpm	248 hp (185 kW; 251 PS) @ 5,000 rpm	39 kg⋅m (282 lb⋅ft; 382 N⋅m) @ 4,000 rpm

== Racing ==
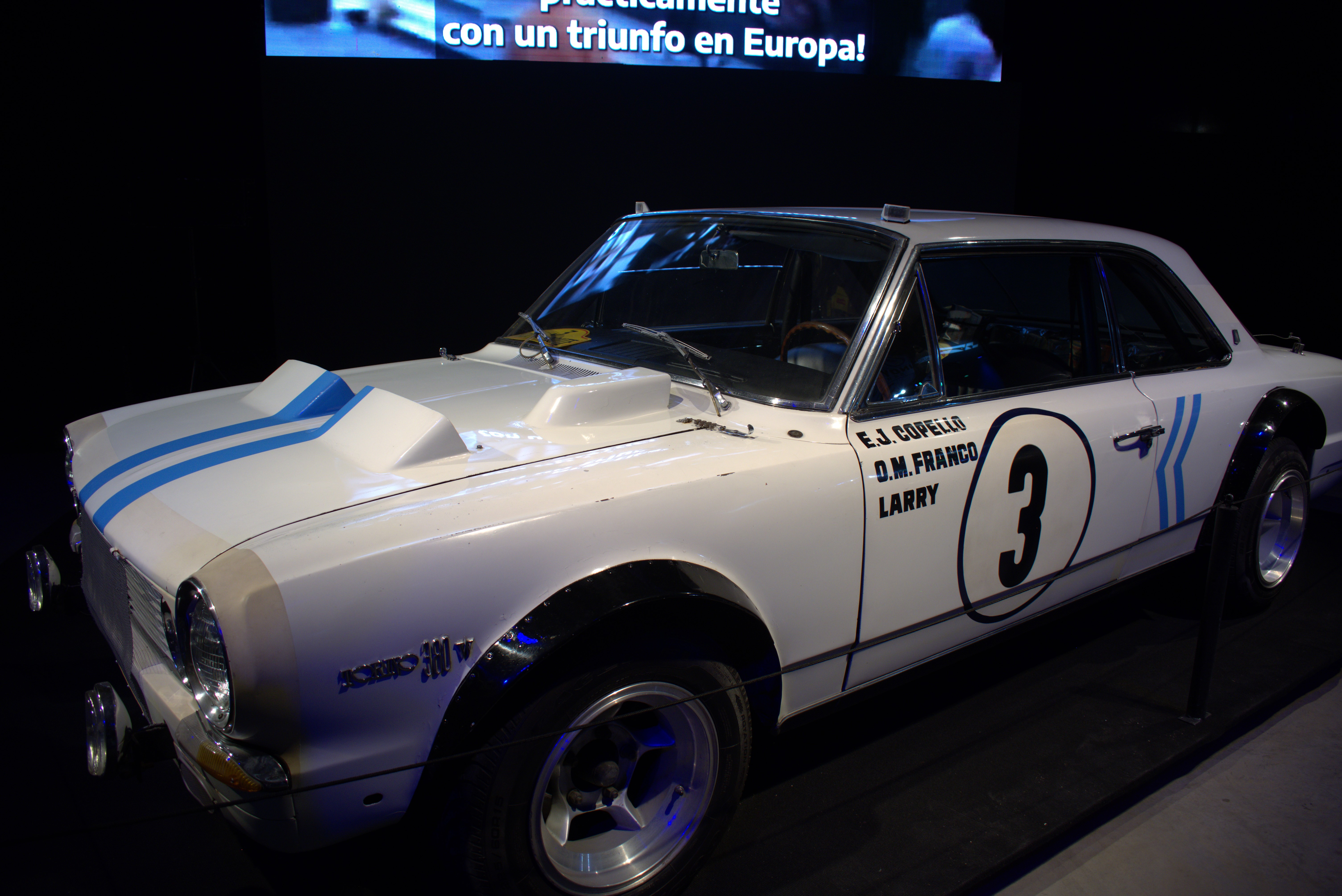
The Torino used in the 1969 Marathon de la Route showcased in Tecnópolis.

A marketing effort was established by IKA, known as the "Argentine Mission of 1969" with coordination by engineer Oreste Berta and under the leadership of Juan Manuel Fangio because competing in auto racing was viewed as an investment in brand image.

The IKA Torino's most notable international success was in the Marathon de la Route race of 1969, with a Torino finishing in fourth place.

The factory modified three cars by reducing their weight from 1,407 to 1,365 kg (3,102 to 3,009 lb) and increasing the engine output to 250 hp (186 kW; 253 PS) at 5,200 rpm to give them a top speed of 230 km/h (143 mph) as well as suspension adjustments using wider tires. The three cars were shipped to Germany and given numbers 1, 2, and 3 due to Fangio's renown in Europe as well as a special classification due to the car's larger engine displacement.

After the three and a half days of racing, the No. 3 Torino that was driven by Eduardo Copello, Alberto Rodríguez Larreta, and Oscar Mauricio Franco, had covered the most laps of all – 334, but lost the top position because they accumulated various penalties during the race. The IKA Torino became "the pride and joy of Argentine car enthusiasts" when their country's team "showed that it could run with the best of Europe on Europe’s toughest circuit." This became "one of the great feats of Argentine motorsport having managed to gather the support of the entire national industry in a feat that showed the world the potential of this model built entirely in the country."

The No. 3 car is displayed in the Juan Manuel Fangio Museum located in Balcarce, Buenos Aires Province, the birthplace of Argentina's Fangio who dominated the first decade of Formula One racing. When not competing on race tracks, Fangio's daily diver was a 1970 IKA Torino 380S four-door sedan. The car was a gift after the 1969 Nürburgring 84-hour race and Fangio drove it until he became president of Mercedes-Benz Argentina in 1974. the car remained in Fangio's name until his death in 1995 and then kept within his family until 2013. The car was auctioned with no reserve at the Silverstone NEC Classic Motor Show Sale in Birmingham, England in 2022 for £28,175, or about $45,000.

The IKA Torino won the Turismo Carretera, a popular touring car racing series in Argentina in 1967 with Eduardo Copello, 1969 with Gastón Perkins, 1970 and 1971 with Rubén Luis di Palma and 2022 with José Manuel Urcera.

The Torino is still being raced, albeit in silhouette form with Jeep Cherokee engines, in the Argentinian Turismo Carretera and other series.

== Legacy ==
By the late 1970s, the Torino was the only non-Renault product manufactured by the French company. It could also be considered the last front-engine, rear-wheel drive Renault, a rarity in itself.

Many Argentines think of the Torino as the national car. Parts are still available and there are fan clubs.

The appeal of the IKA Torino to collectors outside of Argentina is limited because exporting one is difficult due to numerous registration and ownership regulations.
