= 1973 World Championship for Makes =

Racing tournament

1973 World Sportscar Championship

Seasons
- ← 1972 1974 →

The 1973 World Sportscar Championship season was the 21st season of FIA World Sportscar Championship motor racing. It featured the 1973 World Championship for Makes and the 1973 Cup for GT Cars which were contested concurrently over a ten race series. The World Championship for Makes, which was open to Group 5 Sports Cars and Group 4 GT Cars, was won by Matra and the Cup for GT Cars, which was open only to Group 4 GT Cars, was won by Porsche.

== Schedule ==
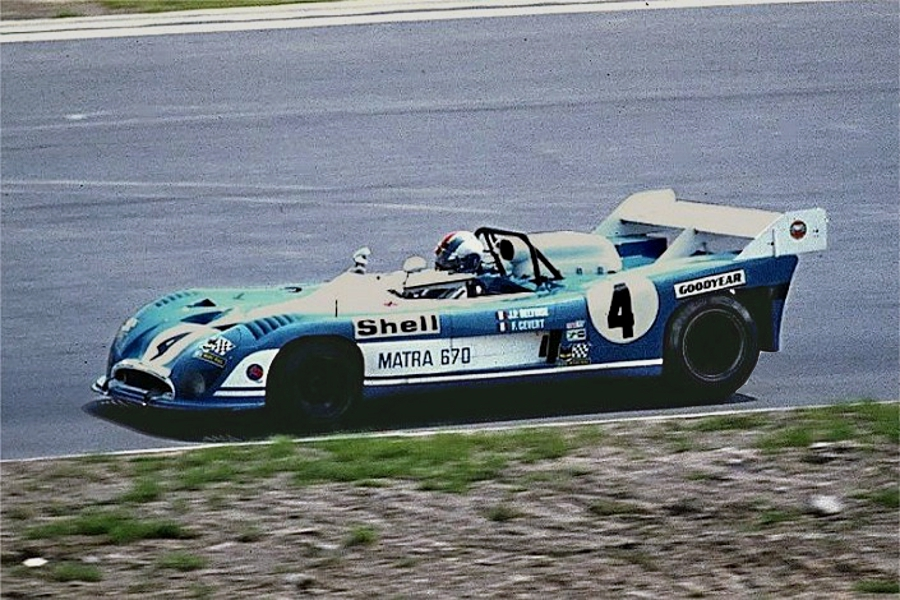
Matra won the 1973 World Championship for Makes

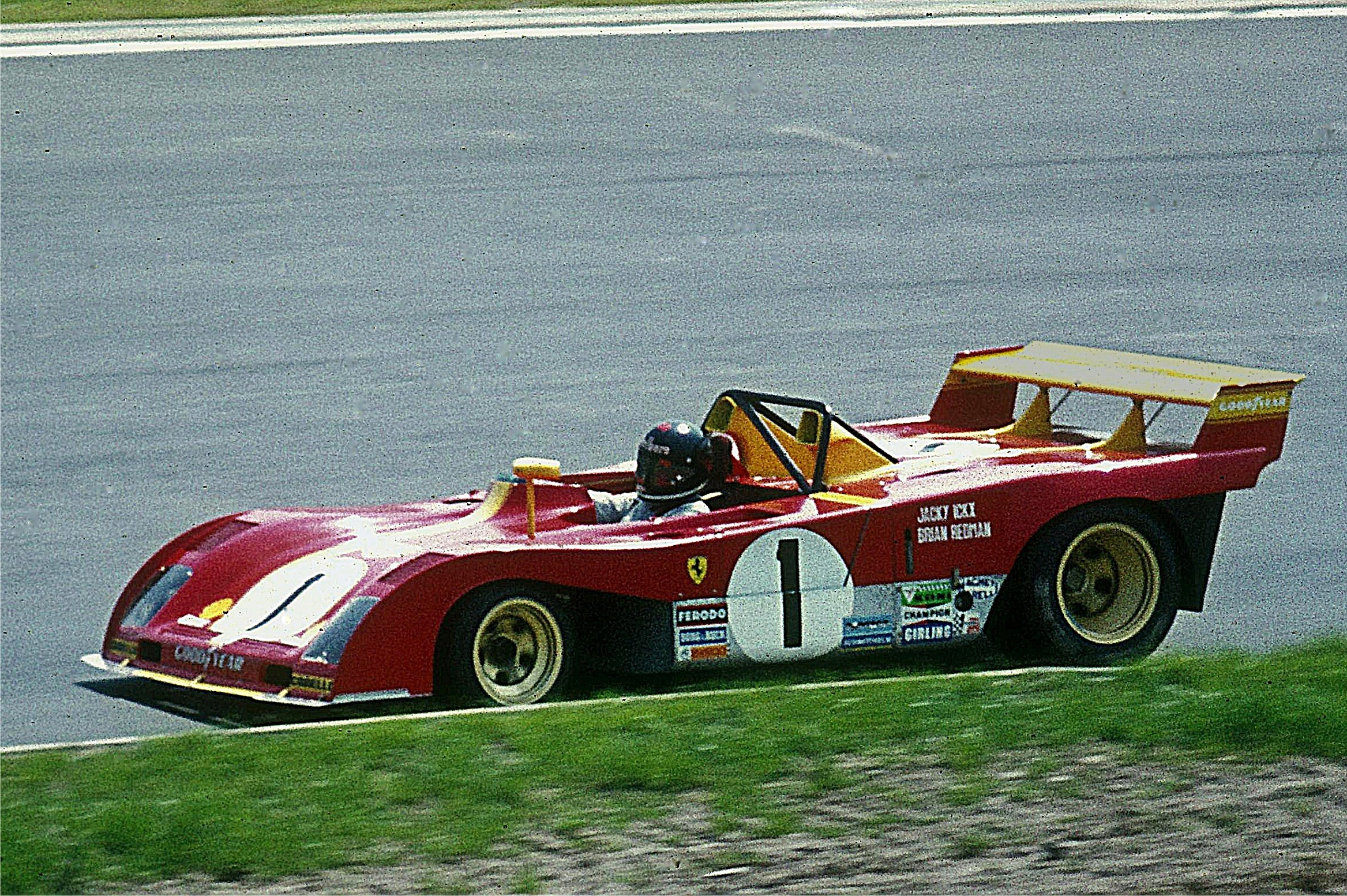
Ferrari placed second in the championship

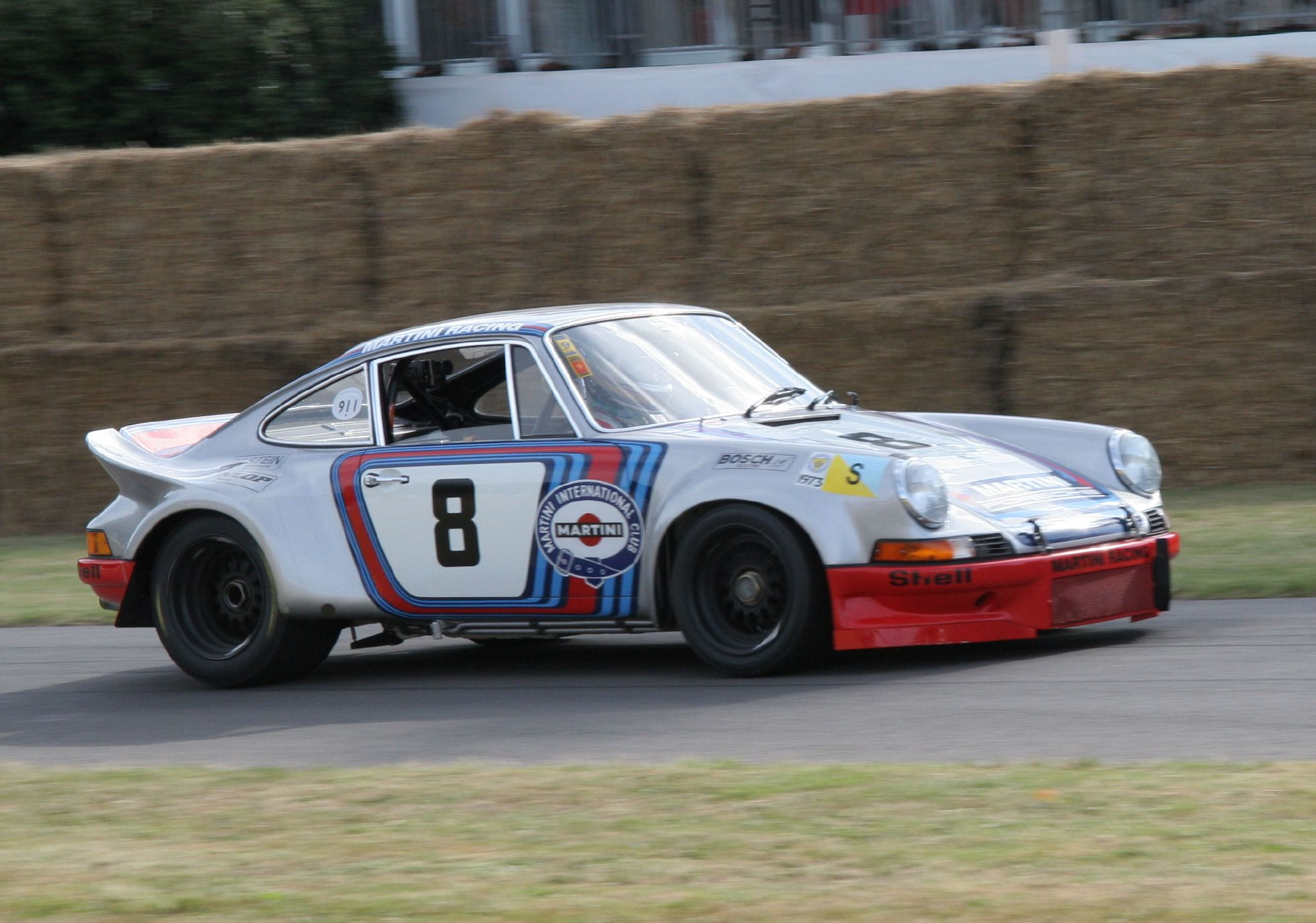
Porsche placed third in the championship

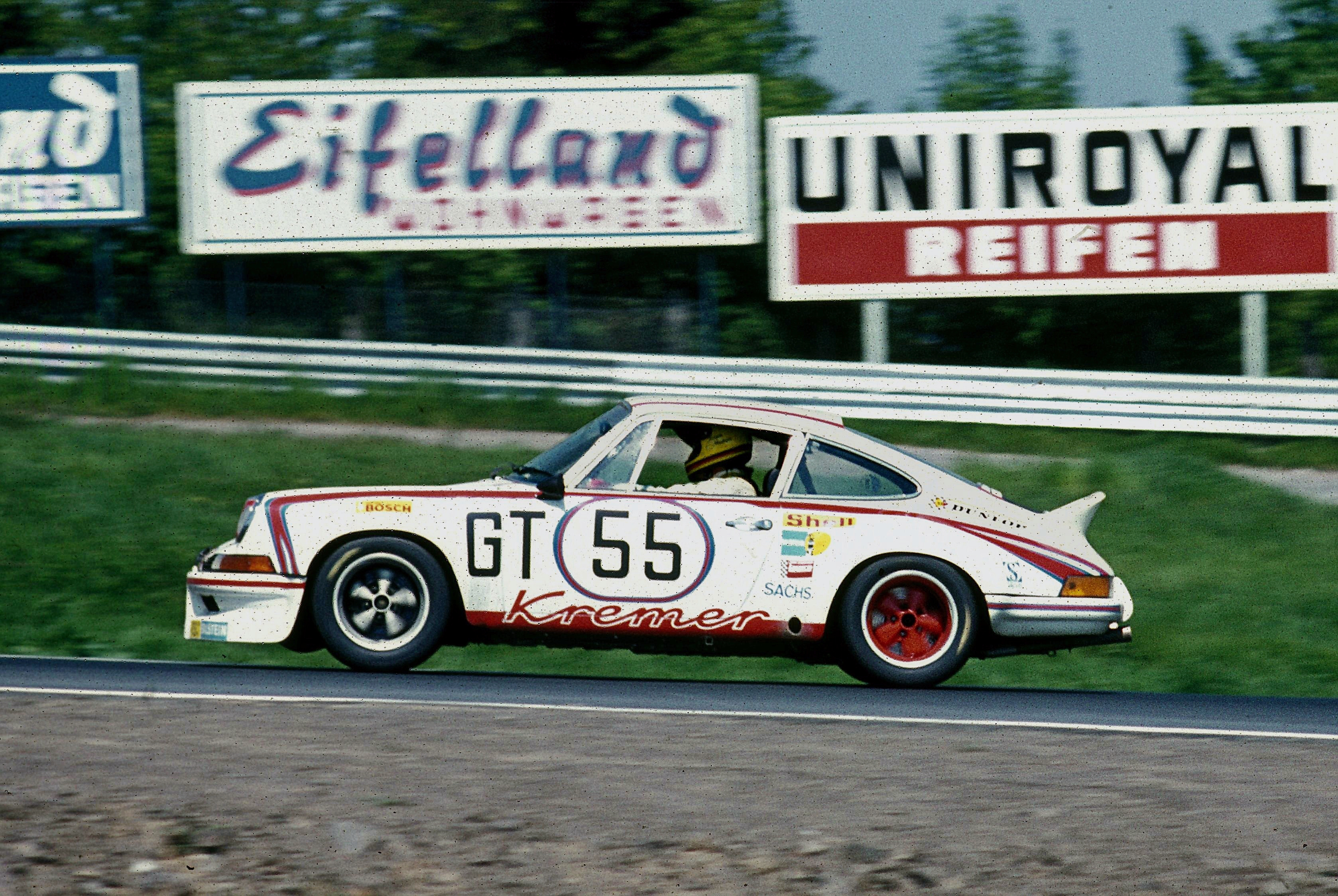
Porsche won the 1973 Cup for GT Cars with 911S and Porsche 911 Carrera RSR (pictured)

The following races counted towards the 1973 World Championship for Makes and the 1973 Cup for GT Cars.

Rnd	Race	Circuit or Location	Date
1	(United States) 24 Hours of Daytona	Daytona International Speedway	3 February; 4 February
2	(Italy) Vallelunga 6 Hours	Vallelunga	25 March
3	(France) Dijon 1000 Kilometres	Dijon-Prenois	15 April
4	(Italy) 1000km Monza	Autodromo Nazionale Monza	25 April
5	(Belgium) 1000km Spa	Circuit de Spa-Francorchamps	6 May
6	(Italy) Targa Florio	Circuito Piccolo delle Madonie	13 May
7	(Germany) ADAC 1000km Nürburgring	Nürburgring	27 May
8	(France) 24 Hours of Le Mans	Circuit de la Sarthe	9 June; 10 June
9	(Austria) Austrian 1000km^{†}	Österreichring	24 June
10	(United States) Watkins Glen 6 Hours	Watkins Glen International	21 July

† - No GT entries were received for the Österreichring event which was held only two weeks after Le Mans. The Buenos Aires 1000 km, scheduled to be held on 21 October, was cancelled six weeks after the running of the Watkins Glen 6 Hours.

== Results ==
=== Races ===
Rnd	Circuit	Sportscar winning team	GT winning team	Results
Rnd	Circuit	Sportscar winning drivers	GT winning drivers	Results
Rnd	Circuit	Sportscar winning car	GT winning car	Results
1	Daytona	(United States) #59 Brumos Porsche	(United States) #22 North American Racing Team	Results
1	Daytona	(United States) Hurley Haywood (United States) Peter Gregg	(France) François Migault (United States) Milt Minter	Results
1	Daytona	(Germany) Porsche 911 Carrera RSR	(Italy) Ferrari 365 GTB/4 Daytona	Results
2	Vallelunga	(France) #5 Equipe Matra-Simca	(Germany) #9 Martini Racing	Results
2	Vallelunga	(France) Henri Pescarolo (France) Gérard Larrousse	(Germany) Willi Kauhsen (United States) George Follmer	Results
2	Vallelunga	(France) Matra-Simca MS670	(Germany) Porsche 911 Carrera RSR	Results
3	Dijon-Prenois	(France) #2 Equipe Matra-Simca	(Germany) #26 Martini Racing	Results
3	Dijon-Prenois	(France) Henri Pescarolo (France) Gérard Larrousse	(Switzerland) Herbert Müller (Netherlands) Gijs van Lennep	Results
3	Dijon-Prenois	(France) Matra-Simca MS670	(Germany) Porsche 911 Carrera RSR	Results
4	Monza	(Italy) #1 SpA Ferrari SEFAC	(Germany) #84 Porsche Kremer Racing	Results
4	Monza	(United Kingdom) Brian Redman (Belgium) Jacky Ickx	(Germany) Erwin Kremer (Germany) Clemens Schickentanz	Results
4	Monza	(Italy) Ferrari 312PB	(Germany) Porsche 911 Carrera RSR	Results
5	Spa-Francorchamps	(United Kingdom) #5 Gulf Racing	(Germany) #40 Martini Racing	Results
5	Spa-Francorchamps	(United Kingdom) Derek Bell (United Kingdom) Mike Hailwood	(Germany) Reinhold Joest (United States) George Follmer	Results
5	Spa-Francorchamps	(United Kingdom) Mirage M6 Ford Cosworth	(Germany) Porsche 911 Carrera RSR	Results
6	Targa Florio	(Germany) #8 Martini Racing	(Italy) #106 Scuderia Brescia Corse	Results
6	Targa Florio	(Switzerland) Herbert Müller (Netherlands) Gijs van Lennep	(Italy) Giovanni Borri (Italy) Mario Barone	Results
6	Targa Florio	(Germany) Porsche 911 Carrera RSR	(Germany) Porsche 911 Carrera RSR	Results
7	Nürburgring	(Italy) #1 SpA Ferrari SEFAC	(Germany) #55 Porsche Kremer Racing	Results
7	Nürburgring	(United Kingdom) Brian Redman (Belgium) Jacky Ickx	(Switzerland) Paul Keller (Germany) Jürgen Neuhaus (Germany) Clemens Schikentanz	Results
7	Nürburgring	(Italy) Ferrari 312PB	(Germany) Porsche 911 Carrera RSR	Results
8	La Sarthe	(France) #11 Equipe Matra-Simca	(France) #39 Automobile Charles Pozzi	Results
8	La Sarthe	(France) Henri Pescarolo (France) Gérard Larrousse	(France) Claude Ballot-Léna (United Kingdom) Vic Elford	Results
8	La Sarthe	(France) Matra-Simca MS670B	(Italy) Ferrari 365 GTB/4 Daytona	Results
9	Österreichring	(France) #11 Equipe Matra-Simca	None	Results
9	Österreichring	(France) Henri Pescarolo (France) Gérard Larrousse		Results
9	Österreichring	(France) Matra-Simca MS670	None	Results
10	Watkins Glen	(France) #33 Equipe Matra-Simca	(United States) #16 Toad Hall Motor Racing	Results
10	Watkins Glen	(France) Henri Pescarolo (France) Gérard Larrousse	(United States) Milt Minter (United States) Michael Keyser	Results
10	Watkins Glen	(France) Matra-Simca MS670	(Germany) Porsche 911 Carrera RSR	Results

=== World Championship for Makes ===
Pos	Make	Rd 1	Rd 2	Rd 3	Rd 4	Rd 5	Rd 6	Rd 7	Rd 8	Rd 9	Rd 10	Total
1	(France) Matra		20	20	12	12			20	20	20	124
2	(Italy) Ferrari	15	15	15	20	(10)		20	15	(12)	15	115
3	(Germany) Porsche	20	8	(3)	(3)	8	20	10	10	(3)	6	82
4	(United Kingdom) Mirage			8		20				10	10	48
5	(United Kingdom) Lola		6	6	10	6	8					36
6	(United Kingdom) Chevron		1		4	2	10	12		1		30
7	(Italy) Alfa Romeo				8		1		4	4		17
8	(Italy) Lancia						15					15
9	(United States) Chevrolet	12									2	14
10	(France) Ligier								3			3

Championship points were awarded to the top 10 finishers in the order of 20-15-12-10-8-6-4-3-2-1 but only for the highest placed car of each make. The 7 best results were retained for each make. Discarded points are shown in the above table within brackets.

=== Cup for GT Cars ===
Pos	Make	Rd 1	Rd 2	Rd 3	Rd 4	Rd 5	Rd 6	Rd 7	Rd 8	Rd 9	Rd 10	Total
1	(Germany) Porsche	(12)	20	20	20	20	20	20	(15)		20	140
2	(Italy) Ferrari	20							20			40
3	(United States) Chevrolet	15							8		15	38
4	(Italy) Alfa Romeo						10					10

No GT entries were received for Round 9.

=== The cars ===
The following models contributed to the nett pointscores of their respective makes.

==== World Championship for Makes ====
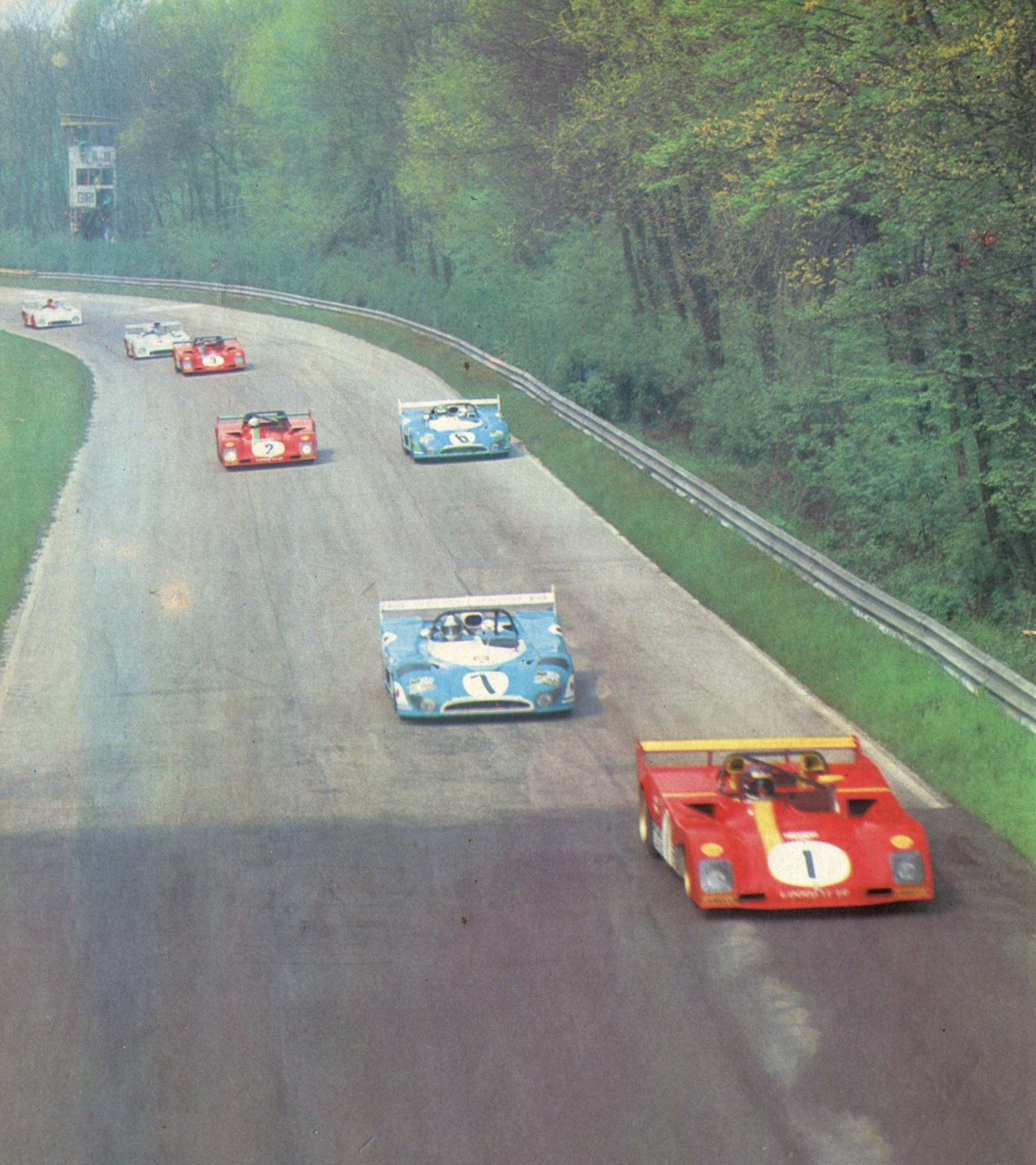
A group of sportscar competitors (Ferrari, Matra Simca and Mirage) for the 1973 season during the Monza round

- Matra Simca MS670 & Matra Simca MS670B
- Ferrari 365 GTB/4 Daytona & Ferrari 312PB
- Porsche 911 Carrera RSR & Porsche 908/3
- Mirage M6 Ford Cosworth
- Lola T282 Ford Cosworth & Lola T290 Ford Cosworth
- Chevron B21 Ford Cosworth & Chevron B23 Ford Cosworth
- Alfa Romeo 33TT3 & Alfa Romeo Giulia GTAm
- Lancia Stratos
- Chevrolet Corvette
- Ligier JS2 Maserati

==== Cup for GT Cars ====
- Porsche 911S & Porsche 911 Carrera RSR
- Ferrari 365 GTB/4 Daytona
- Chevrolet Corvette
- Alfa Romeo Giulia GTAm
