= Matra-Simca MS680 =

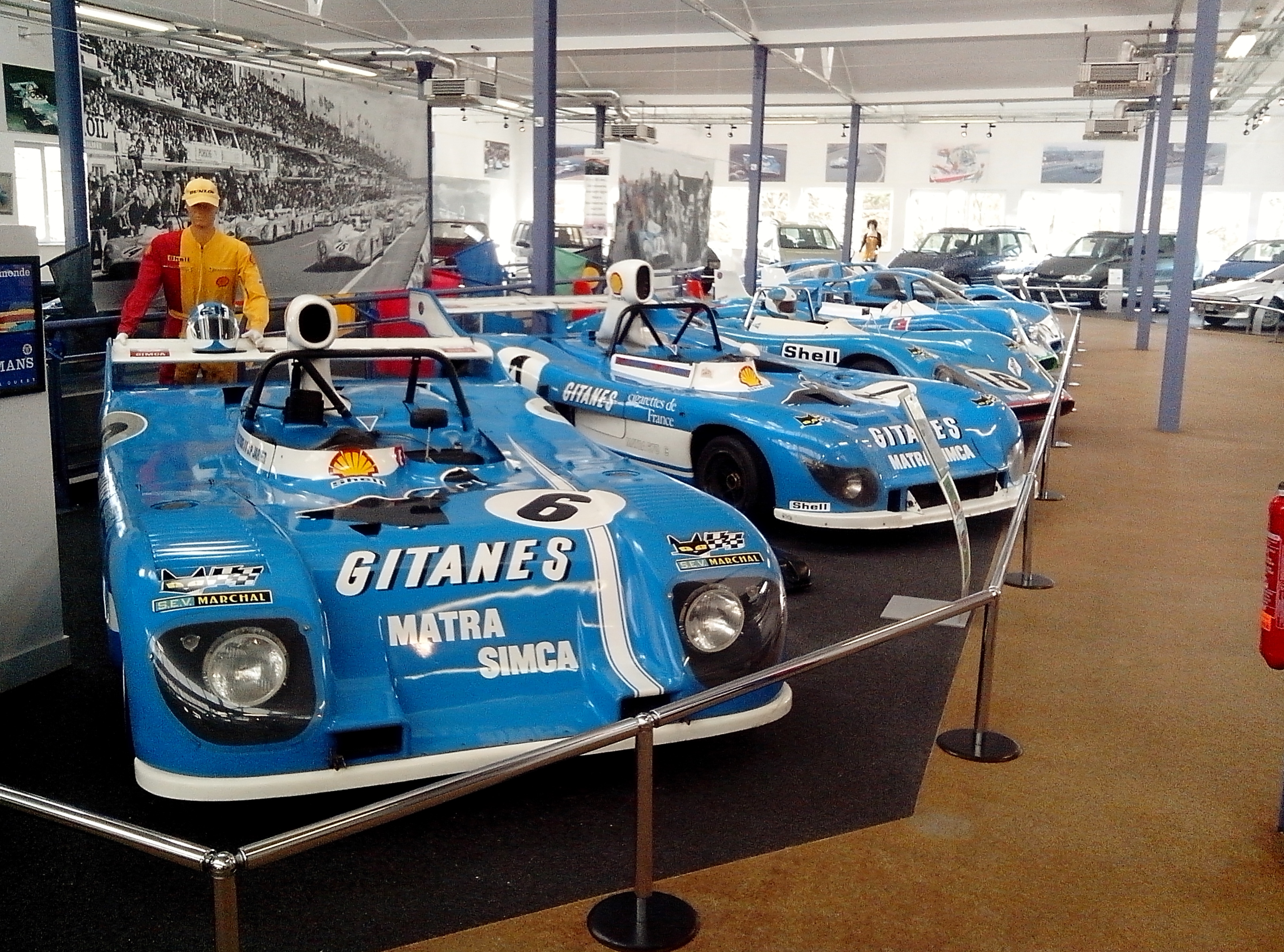
1974 Matra MS680 (car at the front; closest to the camera)

The Matra MS680 (sometimes referred to as Matra-Simca MS680) is a sports prototype racing car made by the French manufacturer Matra, which raced in the 1974 World Sports Prototype Championship and the 1974 24 Hours of Le Mans.

== Description ==
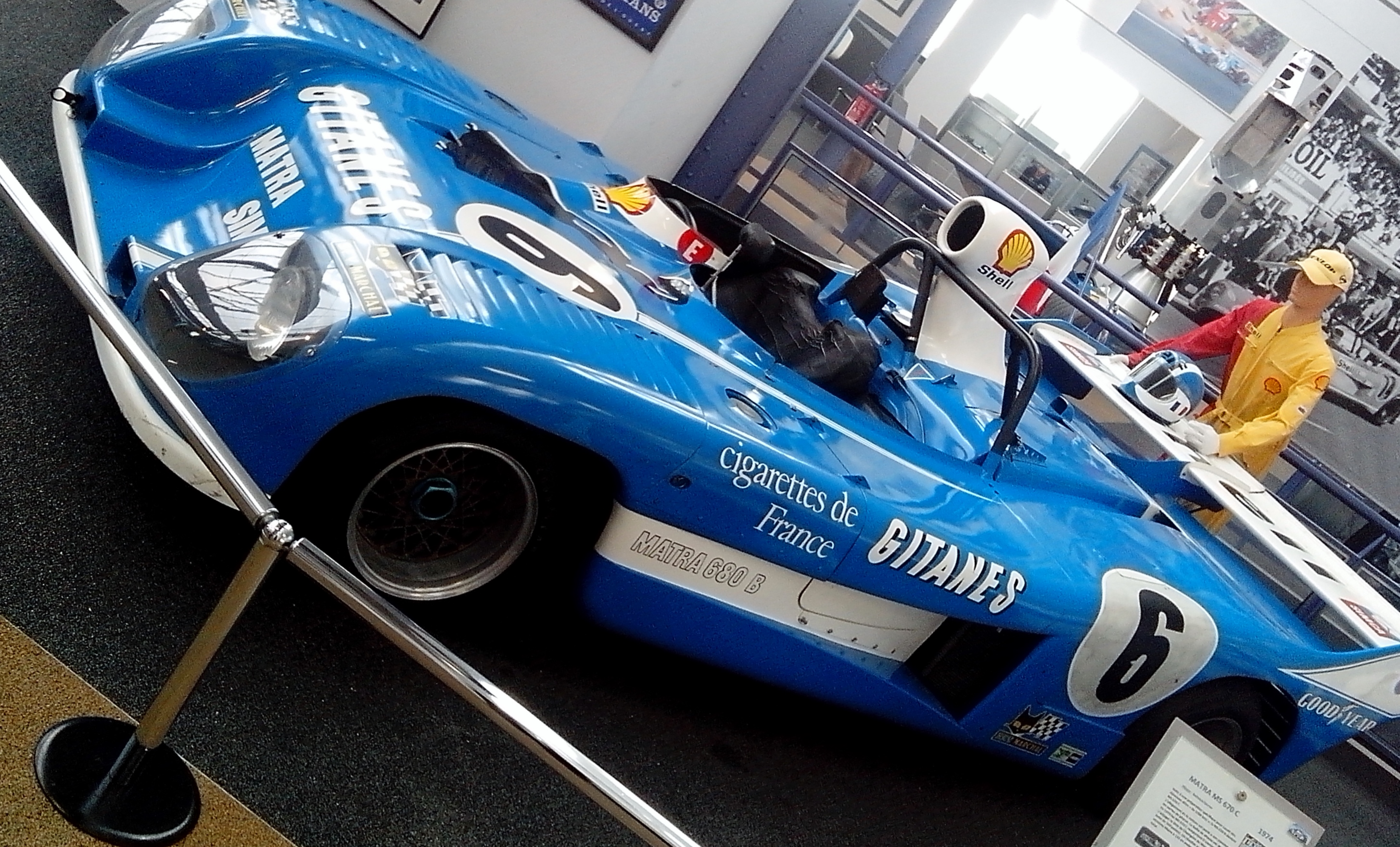
Matra MS680B

The MS680 was the last sports car developed by Matra. The only MS680 made was based on a modified chassis of the MS670C. Powering the car was the 3.0 L (180 cu in) Matra Sports V12 engine.

The MS680 was used in the first pre-race tests and in the race at the 1974 24 Hours of Le Mans. The car was driven by Jean-Pierre Beltoise and Jean-Pierre Jarier. During the race Matra suffered from engine overheating problems, causing the car to break down after 104 laps of the race.

Matra retired from international motor racing in late 1974 and the car was no longer used. The only example of MS680 is kept inside the Matra Museum in Romorantin-Lanthenay.
