= 1974 World Sportscar Championship =

Racing tournament

Seasons
- ← 1973 1975 →

The 1974 World Sportscar Championship season was the 22nd season of FIA World Sportscar Championship motor racing. It featured the 1974 World Championship for Makes and FIA Cup for GT Cars which were contested concurrently over a ten race series from 25 April to 9 November 1974. The World Championship for Makes, which was open to Group 5 Sports Cars and Group 4 GT Cars, was won by Matra and the FIA Cup for GT Cars by Porsche.

== Schedule ==
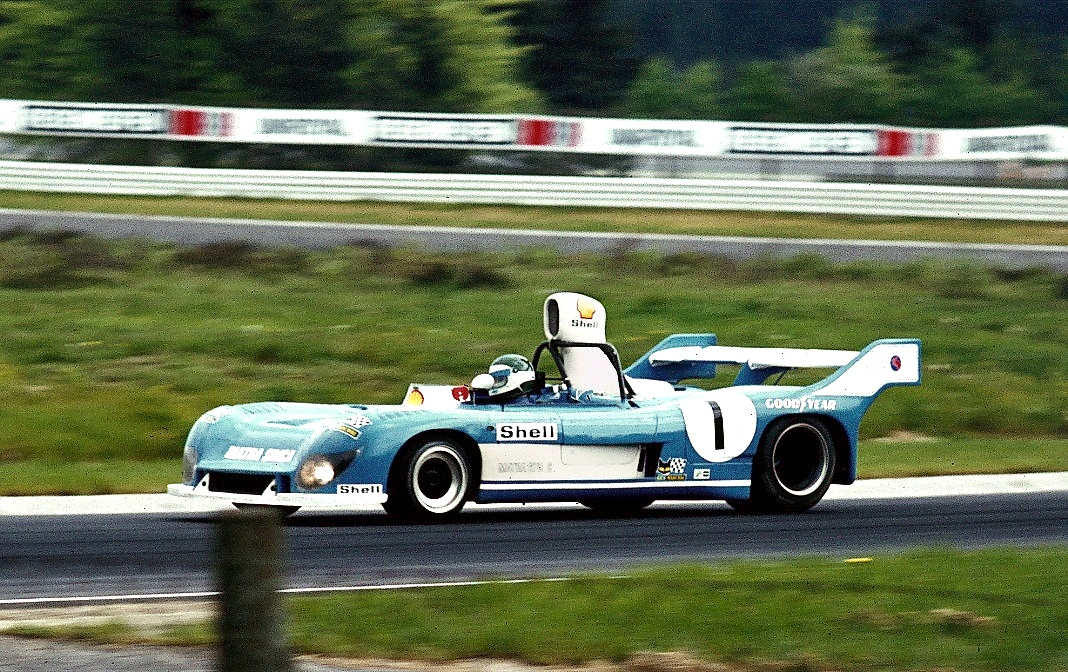
Matra won the championship with its MS670s

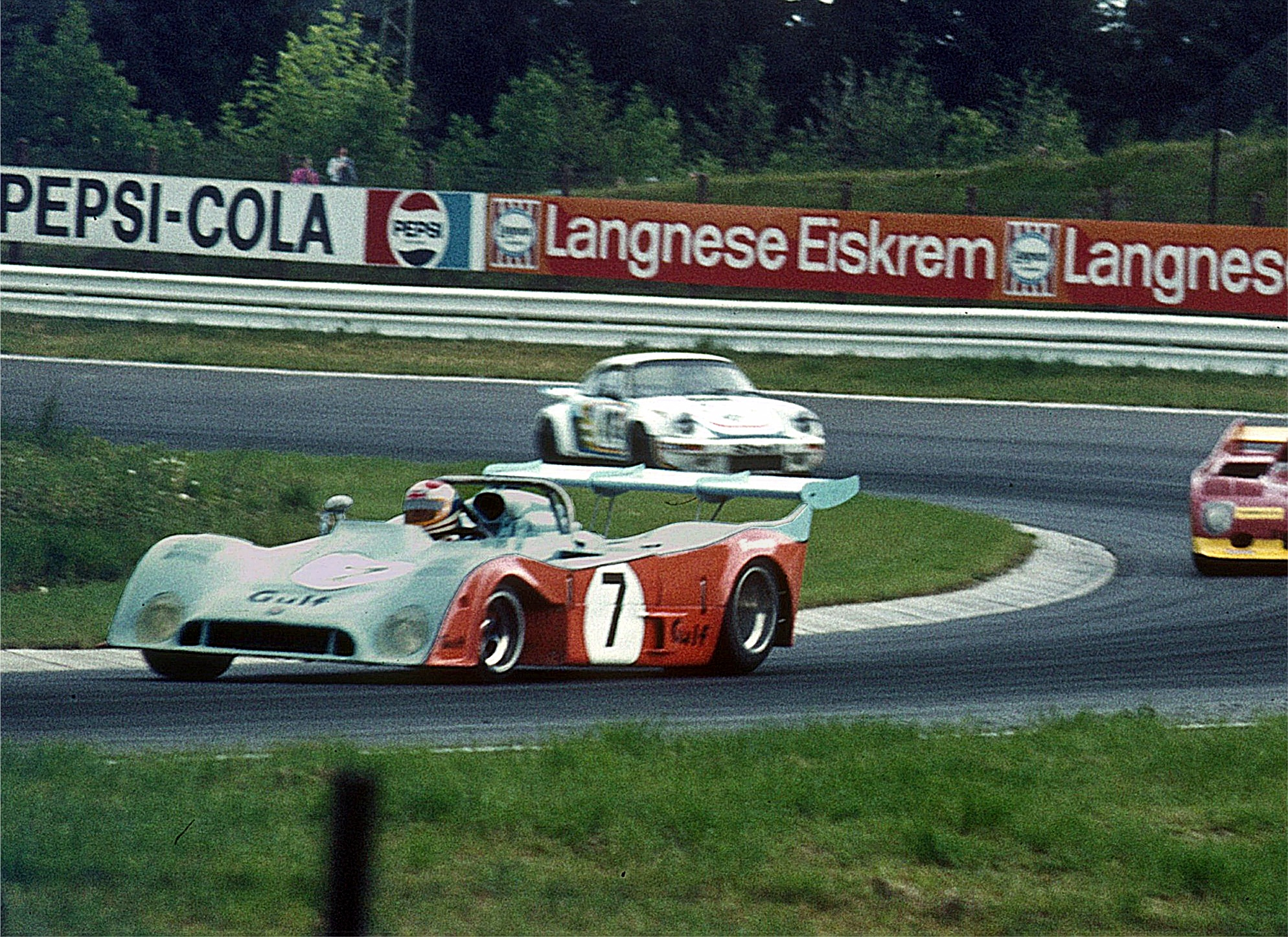
Gulf Ford placed second with its GR7s

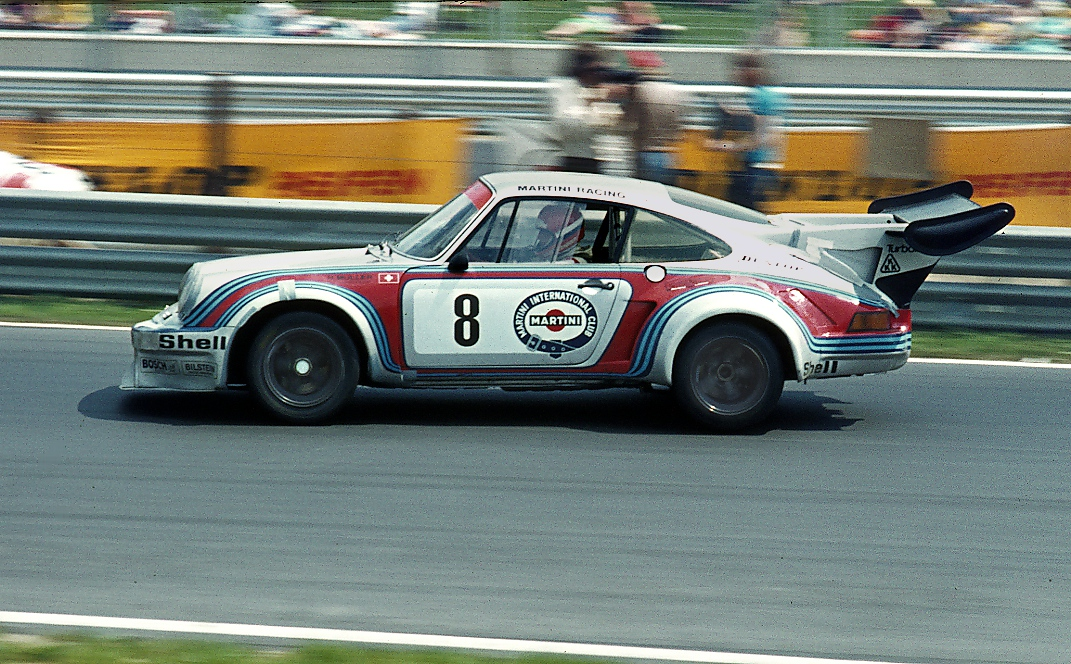
Porsche placed third with its Carrera (pictured) & 908/3 models

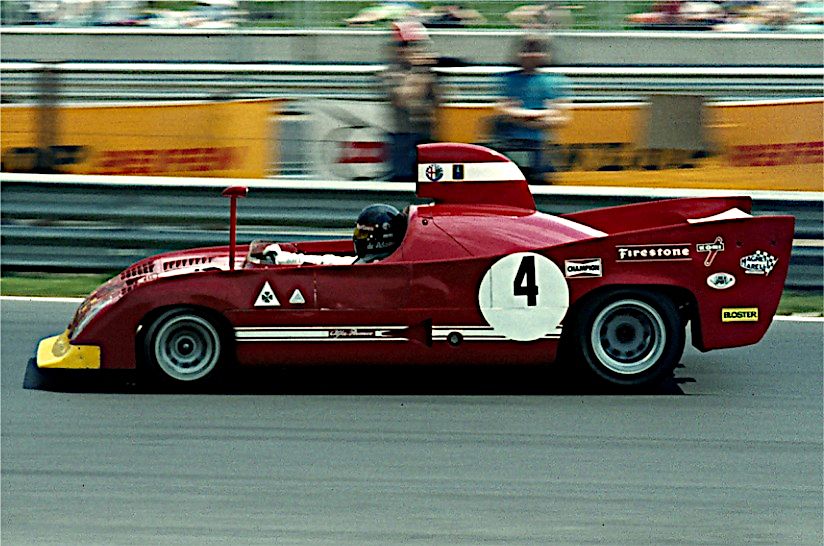
Alfa Romeo placed fourth with its 33TT12s

The 1974 World Championship for Makes and FIA Cup for GT Cars were contested concurrently over a ten race series.

| Rnd | Race | Circuit or Location | Date |
|---|---|---|---|
| 1 | (Italy) 1000km Monza | Autodromo Nazionale Monza | 25 April |
| 2 | (Belgium) 1000km Spa | Circuit de Spa-Francorchamps | 5 May |
| 3 | (Germany) 1000km Nürburgring | Nürburgring | 19 May |
| 4 | (Italy) 1000 km Imola | Autodromo Dino Ferrari | 2 June |
| 5 | (France) 24 Hours of Le Mans | Circuit de la Sarthe | 15 June; 16 June |
| 6 | (Austria) 1000km Zeltweg | Österreichring | 30 June |
| 7 | (United States) Watkins Glen 6 Hours | Watkins Glen International | 13 July |
| 8 | (France) 1000 km Le Castellet | Circuit Paul Ricard | 15 August |
| 9 | (United Kingdom) Brands Hatch 1000km | Brands Hatch | 29 September |
| 10 | (South Africa) Kyalami 6 Hours | Kyalami | 9 November |

== Results ==
=== Races ===
| Rnd | Circuit | Outright winning team | GT winning team | Results |
| Rnd | Circuit | Outright winning drivers | GT winning drivers | Results |
| Rnd | Circuit | Outright winning car | GT winning car | Results |
|---|---|---|---|---|
| 1 | Monza | (Italy) #3 Autodelta SpA | (Germany) #87 Gelo Racing | Results |
| 1 | Monza | (United States) Mario Andretti (Italy) Arturo Merzario | (United Kingdom) John Fitzpatrick (Germany) Georg Loos (Germany) Jürgen Neuhaus | Results |
| 1 | Monza | Alfa Romeo 33TT12 | Porsche 911 Carrera RSR | Results |
| 2 | Spa-Francorchamps | (France) #4 Equipe Gitanes | (Germany) #53 Gelo Racing | Results |
| 2 | Spa-Francorchamps | (France) Jean-Pierre Jarier (Belgium) Jacky Ickx | (United Kingdom) John Fitzpatrick (Germany) Jürgen Barth | Results |
| 2 | Spa-Francorchamps | Matra-Simca MS670C | Porsche 911 Carrera RSR | Results |
| 3 | Nürburgring | (France) #1 Equipe Gitanes | (Germany) #45 Gelo Racing | Results |
| 3 | Nürburgring | (France) Jean-Pierre Jarier (France) Jean-Pierre Beltoise | (United Kingdom) John Fitzpatrick (Germany) Jürgen Barth | Results |
| 3 | Nürburgring | Matra-Simca MS670C | Porsche 911 Carrera RSR | Results |
| 4 | Imola | (France) #2 Equipe Gitanes | (Germany) #152 Porsche Kremer Racing | Results |
| 4 | Imola | (France) Henri Pescarolo (France) Gérard Larrousse | (Germany) Hans Heyer (Switzerland) Paul Keller | Results |
| 4 | Imola | Matra-Simca MS670B/C | Porsche 911 Carrera RSR | Results |
| 5 | La Sarthe | (France) #7 Equipe Gitanes | (France) #71 Raymond Touroul | Results |
| 5 | La Sarthe | (France) Henri Pescarolo (France) Gérard Larrousse | (France) Cyril Grandet (France) Dominique Bardini | Results |
| 5 | La Sarthe | Matra-Simca MS670B | Ferrari 365 GTB/4 | Results |
| 6 | Österreichring | (France) #5 Equipe Gitanes | (Germany) #33 Porsche Kremer Racing | Results |
| 6 | Österreichring | (France) Henri Pescarolo (France) Gérard Larrousse | (Germany) Hans Heyer (Germany) Erwin Kremer (Switzerland) Paul Keller | Results |
| 6 | Österreichring | Matra-Simca MS670B/C | Porsche 911 Carrera RSR | Results |
| 7 | Watkins Glen | (France) #1 Equipe Gitanes | (United States) #59 Brumos Porsche | Results |
| 7 | Watkins Glen | (France) Jean-Pierre Jarier (France) Jean-Pierre Beltoise | (United States) Hurley Haywood (United States) Peter Gregg | Results |
| 7 | Watkins Glen | Matra-Simca MS670C | Porsche 911 Carrera RSR | Results |
| 8 | Le Castellet | (France) #1 Equipe Gitanes | (Germany) #57 Gelo Racing | Results |
| 8 | Le Castellet | (France) Jean-Pierre Jarier (France) Jean-Pierre Beltoise | (Germany) Rolf Stommelen (Australia) Tim Schenken | Results |
| 8 | Le Castellet | Matra-Simca MS670C | Porsche 911 Carrera RSR | Results |
| 9 | Brands Hatch | (France) #1 Equipe Gitanes | (Germany) #55 Gelo Racing | Results |
| 9 | Brands Hatch | (France) Jean-Pierre Jarier (France) Jean-Pierre Beltoise | (United Kingdom) John Fitzpatrick (Netherlands) Toine Hezemans (Liechtenstein) Manfred Schurti | Results |
| 9 | Brands Hatch | Matra-Simca MS670C | Porsche 911 Carrera RSR | Results |
| 10 | Kyalami | (France) #2 Equipe Gitanes | (Germany) #20 Gelo Racing | Results |
| 10 | Kyalami | (France) Henri Pescarolo (France) Gérard Larrousse | (United Kingdom) John Fitzpatrick (Germany) Rolf Stommelen (Australia) Tim Schenken | Results |
| 10 | Kyalami | Matra-Simca MS670B/C | Porsche 911 Carrera RSR | Results |

=== World Championship for Makes ===
Points were awarded to the top 10 finishers in the order of 20-15-12-10-8-6-4-3-2-1. Makes were only awarded the applicable points for their highest finishing car, with no points awarded for positions gained by additional cars. No points were awarded for places gained by Touring Cars or by any other cars from groups which were ineligible for the championship.

Only the best seven scores for each make counted towards the championship, with any other points earned not included in the totals.

| Pos | Make | Rd 1 | Rd 2 | Rd 3 | Rd 4 | Rd 5 | Rd 6 | Rd 7 | Rd 8 | Rd 9 | Rd 10 | Total |
|---|---|---|---|---|---|---|---|---|---|---|---|---|
| 1 | (France) Matra | | 20 | 20 | 20 | 20 | 20 | 20 | 20 | (20) | (20) | 140 |
| 2 | (United Kingdom) Gulf Ford | (10) | 15 | 10 | | 10 | 10 | | 12 | 12 | 12 | 81 |
| 3 | (Germany) Porsche | 8 | 12 | | 8 | 15 | | 15 | 10 | | | 68 |
| 4 | (Italy) Alfa Romeo | 20 | | 15 | 15 | | 15 | | | | | 65 |
| 5 | (United Kingdom) Chevron | 1 | | 3 | 2 | | 4 | | | 10 | 10 | 30 |
| 6 | (France) Ligier | 3 | | | | 3 | | | 6 | | | 12 |
| 7 | (United Kingdom) Lola | 6 | | | | | | | | 1 | 3 | 10 |
| 8 | (Italy) Ferrari | | | | | 8 | | | | | | 8 |
| 9 | (United Kingdom) March | | | | | | | | | 3 | | 3 |
| 10= | (France) Alpine | | | 1 | | | | | | | | 1 |
| 10= | (Italy) AMS | | | | 1 | | | | | | | 1 |
| 10= | (United Kingdom) Ecosse | | | | | | | | | | 1 | 1 |

=== FIA Cup for GT Cars ===
In addition to being eligible for the overall championship, GT Cars also competed for their own award.

| Position | Make | Rd 1 | Rd 2 | Rd 3 | Rd 4 | Rd 5 | Rd 6 | Rd 7 | Rd 8 | Rd 9 | Rd 10 | Total |
|---|---|---|---|---|---|---|---|---|---|---|---|---|
| 1 | (Germany) Porsche | 20 | 20 | 20 | 20 | (12) | 20 | 20 | 20 | (20) | (20) | 140 |
| 2 | (Italy) Ferrari | | | | | 20 | | | | | | 20 |
| 3 | (Italy) De Tomaso | | | | 10 | | | | | | | 10 |
| 4 | (United States) Chevrolet | | | | | 1 | | 6 | 1 | | | 8 |
| 5 | (Germany) BMW | | 3 | | | | | | | | | 3 |

== The cars ==
The following models contributed to the nett point scores of their respective makes.

=== World Championship for Makes ===
Two sportscar competitors, Alfa Romeo and Matra, during the Monza round, 25 April 1974

- Matra-Simca MS670
- Gulf GR7 Ford
- Porsche Carrera, Porsche Carrera RSR & Porsche 908/3
- Alfa Romeo 33TT12
- Chevron B23 Ford & Chevron B26 Ford
- Ligier JS2 Maserati
- Lola T282 Ford, Lola T294 Ford & Lola T292 Ford
- Ferrari 365 GTB/4
- March 74S Ford
- Alpine A441 Renault
- AMS Ford
- Ecosse Ford

=== FIA Cup for GT Cars ===
- Porsche Carrera RSR
- Ferrari 365 GTB/4
- de Tomaso Pantera
- Chevrolet Corvette
- BMW 3.0 CSL
