= 1973 24 Hours of Daytona =

Previous: 1972	Next: 1974
Index: Races | Winners

The 1973 24 Hours of Daytona was a 24-hour endurance sports car race held on February 3–4, 1973 at the Daytona International Speedway road course. The race served as the opening round of the 1973 World Sportscar Championship.

Victory overall and in the Sport 3000 class went to the No. 59 Brumos Racing Porsche 911 Carrera RSR driven by Peter Gregg and Hurley Haywood. Victory in the Grand Touring +2000 class went to the No. 22 North American Racing Team Ferrari Daytona driven by François Migault and Milt Minter. Victory in the Touring 5000 class went to the No. 9 Ray Kessler, Inc. Chevrolet Camaro driven by Ray Kessler, Richie Panch, and Wilbur Pickett. Victory in the Grand Touring 2000 class went to the No. 62 Bob Bergstrom Porsche 911 driven by Bob Bergstrom and Jim Cook. Victory in the Sports 2000 class went to the No. 10 Shierson Racing Chevron B19 driven by Bill Barber and Charlie Kemp. Victory in the Touring 2000 class went to the No. 84 Andy Petery BMW 2002 driven by Andy Petery and Hans Ziereis.

== Race results ==
Class winners in bold.

Pos	Class	No	Team	Drivers	Chassis	Tyre	Laps
Pos	Class	No	Team	Drivers	Engine	Tyre	Laps
1	**S3.0**	**59**	(United States) **Brumos Racing**	(United States) **Peter Gregg** (United States) **Hurley Haywood**	**Porsche 911 Carrera RSR**	**G**	**670**
1	**S3.0**	**59**	(United States) **Brumos Racing**	(United States) **Peter Gregg** (United States) **Hurley Haywood**	**Porsche 2.8L Flat 6 N/A**	**G**	**670**
2	**GT+2.0**	**22**	(United States) **North American Racing Team**	(France) **François Migault** (United States) **Milt Minter**	**Ferrari 365 GTB/4**	**G**	**648**
2	**GT+2.0**	**22**	(United States) **North American Racing Team**	(France) **François Migault** (United States) **Milt Minter**	**Ferrari 4.4L V12 N/A**	**G**	**648**
3	GT+2.0	5	(United States) Dave Heinz	(United States) Dave Heinz (United States) Bob McClure (United States) Dana English	Chevrolet Corvette	**G**	644
3	GT+2.0	5	(United States) Dave Heinz	(United States) Dave Heinz (United States) Bob McClure (United States) Dana English	Chevrolet 7.0L V8 N/A	**G**	644
4	GT+2.0	77	(United States) Silverstone Racing	(United States) George Stone (United States) Bruce Jennings (United States) Mike Downs	Porsche 911	**G**	638
4	GT+2.0	77	(United States) Silverstone Racing	(United States) George Stone (United States) Bruce Jennings (United States) Mike Downs	Porsche 2.5L Flat 6 N/A	**G**	638
5	GT+2.0	21	(United States) North American Racing Team	(United States) Luigi Chinetti Jr. (United States) Bob Grossman (United States) Wilbur Shaw Jr.	Ferrari 365 GTB/4	**G**	632
5	GT+2.0	21	(United States) North American Racing Team	(United States) Luigi Chinetti Jr. (United States) Bob Grossman (United States) Wilbur Shaw Jr.	Ferrari 4.4L V12 N/A	**G**	632
6	GT+2.0	54	(Germany) Porsche Kremer Racing	(United Kingdom) John Fitzpatrick (Germany) Erwin Kremer (Switzerland) Paul Keller	Porsche 911	**D**	630
6	GT+2.0	54	(Germany) Porsche Kremer Racing	(United Kingdom) John Fitzpatrick (Germany) Erwin Kremer (Switzerland) Paul Keller	Porsche 2.5L Flat 6 N/A	**D**	630
7	**T5.0**	**9**	(United States) **Ray Kessler, Inc.**	(United States) **Ray Kessler** (United States) **Richie Panch** (United States) **Wilbur Pickett**	**Chevrolet Camaro Z28**	**G**	**592**
7	**T5.0**	**9**	(United States) **Ray Kessler, Inc.**	(United States) **Ray Kessler** (United States) **Richie Panch** (United States) **Wilbur Pickett**	Chevrolet 5.0L V8 N/A	**G**	**592**
8	GT+2.0	15	(United States) Toad Hall Motor Racing	(United States) Michael Keyser (United States) Tony Adamowicz (United States) Bob Beasley	Porsche 911	?	587
8	GT+2.0	15	(United States) Toad Hall Motor Racing	(United States) Michael Keyser (United States) Tony Adamowicz (United States) Bob Beasley	Porsche 2.5L Flat 6 N/A	?	587
9	GT+2.0	56	(Germany) Joest Racing	(Germany) Sepp Greger (Germany) Kurt Hild (Germany) Didier Schmid	Porsche 911	?	574
9	GT+2.0	56	(Germany) Joest Racing	(Germany) Sepp Greger (Germany) Kurt Hild (Germany) Didier Schmid	Porsche 2.5L Flat 6 N/A	?	574
10	**GT2.0**	**62**	(United States) **Bob Bergstrom**	(United States) **Bob Bergstrom** (United States) **Jim Cook**	**Porsche 911**	?	**571**
10	**GT2.0**	**62**	(United States) **Bob Bergstrom**	(United States) **Bob Bergstrom** (United States) **Jim Cook**	**Porsche 2.0L Flat 6 N/A**	?	**571**
11	GT+2.0	43	(United States) Dave Helmick	(United States) Dave Helmick (United States) John O'Steen (United States) Stephen Behr	Porsche 911	?	558
11	GT+2.0	43	(United States) Dave Helmick	(United States) Dave Helmick (United States) John O'Steen (United States) Stephen Behr	Porsche 2.5L Flat 6 N/A	?	558
12	S3.0	19	(Canada) Harry Bytzek	(Canada) Rudy Bartling (Canada) Harry Bytzek (Canada) Bert Kuehne	Porsche 908/02	**F**	532
12	S3.0	19	(Canada) Harry Bytzek	(Canada) Rudy Bartling (Canada) Harry Bytzek (Canada) Bert Kuehne	Porsche 3.0L Flat 8 N/A	**F**	532
13	T5.0	30	(United States) Guido C. Levetto	(United States) Mario Levetto (United States) Guido Levetto (United States) Ara Dube	Chevrolet Camaro	?	532
13	T5.0	30	(United States) Guido C. Levetto	(United States) Mario Levetto (United States) Guido Levetto (United States) Ara Dube	Chevrolet 5.0L V8 N/A	?	532
14	GT+2.0	51	(United States) Airport Motorsport	(United States) Klaus Selbert (United States) W. Marvin Schoenfeld (United States) Bob Klempel	Porsche 911	?	499
14	GT+2.0	51	(United States) Airport Motorsport	(United States) Klaus Selbert (United States) W. Marvin Schoenfeld (United States) Bob Klempel	Porsche 2.5L Flat 6 N/A	?	499
15 DNF	GT+2.0	49	(United States) John Greenwood	(United States) Don Yenko (United States) Robert R. Johnson	Chevrolet Corvette	?	494
15 DNF	GT+2.0	49	(United States) John Greenwood	(United States) Don Yenko (United States) Robert R. Johnson	Chevrolet 7.0L V8 N/A	?	494
16	T5.0	80	(United States) Byron Cook Racing	(United States) John Elliott (United States) Bill McDill	Chevrolet Camaro	?	488
16	T5.0	80	(United States) Byron Cook Racing	(United States) John Elliott (United States) Bill McDill	Chevrolet 5.0L V8 N/A	?	488
17	T5.0	75	(United States) Don Winter	(United States) Larry Bock (United States) Carl Shafer (United States) Gene Harrington	Chevrolet Camaro	?	451
17	T5.0	75	(United States) Don Winter	(United States) Larry Bock (United States) Carl Shafer (United States) Gene Harrington	Chevrolet 5.0L V8 N/A	?	451
18	T5.0	33	(United States) John McComb	(United States) John McComb (United States) Dave Dooley	Ford Mustang	?	437
18	T5.0	33	(United States) John McComb	(United States) John McComb (United States) Dave Dooley	Ford N/A	?	437
19 DNF	S3.0	6	(United States) Penske Racing	(United States) Mark Donohue (United States) George Follmer	Porsche 911 Carrera RSR	**G**	405
19 DNF	S3.0	6	(United States) Penske Racing	(United States) Mark Donohue (United States) George Follmer	Porsche 2.8L Flat 6 N/A	**G**	405
20 DNF	GT+2.0	20	(United States) North American Racing Team	(Italy) Arturo Merzario (France) Jean-Pierre Jarier	Ferrari 365 GTB/4	**G**	394
20 DNF	GT+2.0	20	(United States) North American Racing Team	(Italy) Arturo Merzario (France) Jean-Pierre Jarier	Ferrari 4.4L V12 N/A	**G**	394
21 DNF	GT+2.0	31	(United States) Locke Development Corporation	(United States) Jim Locke (United States) Bob Bailey	Porsche 911	?	387
21 DNF	GT+2.0	31	(United States) Locke Development Corporation	(United States) Jim Locke (United States) Bob Bailey	Porsche 2.5L Flat 6 N/A	?	387
22 DNF	S3.0	2	(United Kingdom) Gulf Racing	(United Kingdom) Mike Hailwood (United Kingdom) John Watson	Mirage M6	**F**	366
22 DNF	S3.0	2	(United Kingdom) Gulf Racing	(United Kingdom) Mike Hailwood (United Kingdom) John Watson	Ford 3.0L V8 N/A	**F**	366
23 DNF	**S2.0**	**10**	(United States) **Shierson Racing**	(United States) **Bill Barber** (United States) **Charlie Kemp**	**Chevron B19**	**G**	**337**
23 DNF	**S2.0**	**10**	(United States) **Shierson Racing**	(United States) **Bill Barber** (United States) **Charlie Kemp**	**Ford I4 N/A**	**G**	**337**
24	T2.0	84	(United States) Andy Petery	(United States) Andy Petery (United States) Hans Ziereis	BMW 2002	?	313
24	T2.0	84	(United States) Andy Petery	(United States) Andy Petery (United States) Hans Ziereis	BMW 2.0L I4 N/A	?	313
25 DNF	GT+2.0	23	(United States) North American Racing Team	(France) Claude Ballot-Léna (France) Jean-Claude Andruet	Ferrari 365 GTB/4	**G**	284
25 DNF	GT+2.0	23	(United States) North American Racing Team	(France) Claude Ballot-Léna (France) Jean-Claude Andruet	Ferrari 4.4L V12 N/A	**G**	284
26 DNF	S3.0	12	(Switzerland) Scuderia Filipinetti	(Sweden) Reine Wisell (France) Jean-Louis Lafosse (Belgium) Hughes de Fierlant	Lola T282	**G**	281
26 DNF	S3.0	12	(Switzerland) Scuderia Filipinetti	(Sweden) Reine Wisell (France) Jean-Louis Lafosse (Belgium) Hughes de Fierlant	Ford 3.0L V8 N/A	**G**	281
27 DNF	S3.0	3	(France) Equipe Matra-Simca	(France) François Cevert (France) Jean-Pierre Beltoise (France) Henri Pescarolo	Matra-Simca MS670	**G**	267
27 DNF	S3.0	3	(France) Equipe Matra-Simca	(France) François Cevert (France) Jean-Pierre Beltoise (France) Henri Pescarolo	Matra 3.0L V12 N/A	**G**	267
28 DNF	S3.0	57	(Germany) Reinhold Jöst	(Germany) Reinhold Jöst (Italy) Mario Casoni (Switzerland) Paul Blancpain	Porsche 908	**F**	244
28 DNF	S3.0	57	(Germany) Reinhold Jöst	(Germany) Reinhold Jöst (Italy) Mario Casoni (Switzerland) Paul Blancpain	Porsche 3.0L Flat 6 N/A	**F**	244
29 DNF	S2.0	57	(United States) Promotion Advertising	(United States) Hugh Kleinpeter (United States) Jim Gammon (United States) Tom Shelton	Chevron B21	**G**	241
29 DNF	S2.0	57	(United States) Promotion Advertising	(United States) Hugh Kleinpeter (United States) Jim Gammon (United States) Tom Shelton	Ford I4 N/A	**G**	241
30 DNF	T5.0	7	(United States) Eddie Johnson	(United States) Clay Young (United States) Eddie Johnson (United States) Jim Fitzgerald	Chevrolet Camaro	?	233
30 DNF	T5.0	7	(United States) Eddie Johnson	(United States) Clay Young (United States) Eddie Johnson (United States) Jim Fitzgerald	Chevrolet 5.0L V8 N/A	?	233
31 DNF	S2.0	93	(United States) Professional Racing	(United States) Bob Fisher (United States) Tom Gloy	Chevron B16	**F**	230
31 DNF	S2.0	93	(United States) Professional Racing	(United States) Bob Fisher (United States) Tom Gloy	Ford I4 N/A	**F**	230
32	GT2.0	38	(Mexico) Quintanilla/Muniz	(Mexico) Daniel Muñiz (Mexico) Roberto Quintanilla	Porsche 914-6 GT	**G**	215
32	GT2.0	38	(Mexico) Quintanilla/Muniz	(Mexico) Daniel Muñiz (Mexico) Roberto Quintanilla	Porsche 2.0L Flat 6 N/A	**G**	215
33 DNF	GT+2.0	89	(United States) Holbert Porsche	(United States) Mike Tillson (United States) Al Holbert (United States) Dieter Oest	Porsche 911	?	213
33 DNF	GT+2.0	89	(United States) Holbert Porsche	(United States) Mike Tillson (United States) Al Holbert (United States) Dieter Oest	Porsche Flat 6 N/A	?	213
34 DNF	T5.0	96	(United States) U.S. Davis Racing	(United States) Jose Rodriguez (United States) Reinaldo Almeida	Chevrolet Camaro	?	198
34 DNF	T5.0	96	(United States) U.S. Davis Racing	(United States) Jose Rodriguez (United States) Reinaldo Almeida	Chevrolet 7.0L V8 N/A	?	198
35 DNF	GT+2.0	64	(United States) Weaver Chevrolet	(United States) Bob Baechle (United States) Roger Pierce (United States) Alex Davidson	Chevrolet Corvette C3	**G**	191
35 DNF	GT+2.0	64	(United States) Weaver Chevrolet	(United States) Bob Baechle (United States) Roger Pierce (United States) Alex Davidson	Chevrolet 7.0L V8 N/A	**G**	191
36	S3.0	1	(United Kingdom) Gulf Racing	(United Kingdom) Derek Bell (New Zealand) Howden Ganley	Mirage M6	**F**	179
36	S3.0	1	(United Kingdom) Gulf Racing	(United Kingdom) Derek Bell (New Zealand) Howden Ganley	Ford 3.0L V8 N/A	**F**	179
37 DNF	GT2.0	16	(United States) Toad Hall Motor Sport	(United States) Peter Kirill (United States) Russ Norburn (United States) Bill Bean	Porsche 911	?	175
37 DNF	GT2.0	16	(United States) Toad Hall Motor Sport	(United States) Peter Kirill (United States) Russ Norburn (United States) Bill Bean	Porsche 2.0L Flat 6 N/A	?	175
38 DNF	S2.0	88	(United States) Ed Abate	(United States) Ed Abate (United States) Bill Cuddy	Porsche 910	**G**	167
38 DNF	S2.0	88	(United States) Ed Abate	(United States) Ed Abate (United States) Bill Cuddy	Porsche 2.0L Flat 6 N/A	**G**	167
39 DNF	GT+2.0	58	(United States) Brumos Racing	(United States) Andrew Carduner (Canada) Jacques Bienvenue	Porsche 911	?	127
39 DNF	GT+2.0	58	(United States) Brumos Racing	(United States) Andrew Carduner (Canada) Jacques Bienvenue	Porsche 2.5L Flat 6 N/A	?	127
40 DNF	T5.0	94	(United States) Bolus & Snopes	(United States) Steve Ross (United States) Bob Mitchell (United States) Dave Houser	Chevrolet Camaro	?	120
40 DNF	T5.0	94	(United States) Bolus & Snopes	(United States) Steve Ross (United States) Bob Mitchell (United States) Dave Houser	Chevrolet 5.0L V8 N/A	?	120
41 DNF	GT+2.0	11	(United States) Troy Promotions, Inc.	(United States) Tony DeLorenzo (Canada) Maurice Carter	Chevrolet Corvette	**F**	101
41 DNF	GT+2.0	11	(United States) Troy Promotions, Inc.	(United States) Tony DeLorenzo (Canada) Maurice Carter	Chevrolet 7.0L V8 N/A	**F**	101
42 DNF	GT+2.0	99	(Puerto Rico) Diego Febles	(Puerto Rico) Horacio Alvarez (Puerto Rico) Diego Febles	Porsche 911	?	65
42 DNF	GT+2.0	99	(Puerto Rico) Diego Febles	(Puerto Rico) Horacio Alvarez (Puerto Rico) Diego Febles	Porsche 2.5L Flat 6 N/A	?	65
43 DNF	GT+2.0	34	(United States) Murray Racing	(United States) Jerry Thompson (United States) Ike Knupp (United States) Mike Murray	Chevrolet Corvette	**G**	50
43 DNF	GT+2.0	34	(United States) Murray Racing	(United States) Jerry Thompson (United States) Ike Knupp (United States) Mike Murray	Chevrolet 7.0L V8 N/A	**G**	50
44 DNF	T5.0	8	(United States) Automotive Engineering Enterprises	(United States) Tom Nehl (United States) Steve Durst	Chevrolet Camaro	?	49
44 DNF	T5.0	8	(United States) Automotive Engineering Enterprises	(United States) Tom Nehl (United States) Steve Durst	Chevrolet 5.0L V8 N/A	?	49
45 DNF	GT+2.0	29	(United States) Jef Stevens	(United States) Ralph Noseda (United States) Ray Mummery	Chevrolet Camaro	?	38
45 DNF	GT+2.0	29	(United States) Jef Stevens	(United States) Ralph Noseda (United States) Ray Mummery	Chevrolet V8 N/A	?	38
46 DNF	T5.0	14	(United States) C. C. Canada	(United States) C. C. Canada (United States) Bob Christiansen (United States) John Tremblay	Chevrolet Camaro	?	29
46 DNF	T5.0	14	(United States) C. C. Canada	(United States) C. C. Canada (United States) Bob Christiansen (United States) John Tremblay	Chevrolet 5.0L V8 N/A	?	29
47 DNF	T5.0	17	(United States) Takondo Racing	(United States) Vince Gimondo (United States) Billy Dingman	Chevrolet Camaro	?	15
47 DNF	T5.0	17	(United States) Takondo Racing	(United States) Vince Gimondo (United States) Billy Dingman	Chevrolet 5.0L V8 N/A	?	15
48 DNF	T5.0	55	(United States) Tiny Lund	(United States) Tiny Lund (United States) Stephen Behr (United States) Jimmy Capps	Pontiac Firebird	?	15
48 DNF	T5.0	55	(United States) Tiny Lund	(United States) Tiny Lund (United States) Stephen Behr (United States) Jimmy Capps	Pontiac 5.0L V8 N/A	?	15
49 DNF	S2.0	41	(United States) Parametrics Systems	(United States) Raymond Gage (United States) Jim Grob (United States) Gary Ouellette	Lotus 23	**G**	14
49 DNF	S2.0	41	(United States) Parametrics Systems	(United States) Raymond Gage (United States) Jim Grob (United States) Gary Ouellette	BMW 2.0L I4 N/A	**G**	14
50 DNF	T2.0	25	(United States) John Buffum	(United States) Bert Everett (United States) John Buffum (United States) Wilbur Pickett	Ford Escort RS 1600	?	9
50 DNF	T2.0	25	(United States) John Buffum	(United States) Bert Everett (United States) John Buffum (United States) Wilbur Pickett	Ford 2.0L I4 N/A	?	9
51 DNF	GT+2.0	48	(United States) John Greenwood	(United States) John Greenwood (United States) Ron Grable	Chevrolet Corvette	?	7
51 DNF	GT+2.0	48	(United States) John Greenwood	(United States) John Greenwood (United States) Ron Grable	Chevrolet 7.0L V8 N/A	?	7
52 DNF	T5.0	47	(United States) Chitwood Racing	(United States) Tim Chitwood (United States) Joie Chitwood (United States) Bob Nagel	Chevrolet Camaro	?	6
52 DNF	T5.0	47	(United States) Chitwood Racing	(United States) Tim Chitwood (United States) Joie Chitwood (United States) Bob Nagel	Chevrolet 5.0L V8 N/A	?	6
53 DNF	T2.0	24	(United States) John Buffum	(Mexico) Fred van Beuren Jr. (Mexico) Guillermo Rojas (Mexico) Héctor Rebaque	Ford Escort RS 1600	?	0
53 DNF	T2.0	24	(United States) John Buffum	(Mexico) Fred van Beuren Jr. (Mexico) Guillermo Rojas (Mexico) Héctor Rebaque	Ford I4 N/A	?	0
DNQ	GT2.0	73	(United States) Dale Kreider	(United States) Dale Kreider (United States) Rick Silvers (United States) Paul Toppino	Triumph GT6	?	-
DNQ	GT2.0	73	(United States) Dale Kreider	(United States) Dale Kreider (United States) Rick Silvers (United States) Paul Toppino	?	?	-
DNQ	T5.0	27	(United States) Ernie Shaw	(United States) Ernie Shaw (United States) Norm Mosher (United States) Al Straub	Ford Mustang	?	-
DNQ	T5.0	27	(United States) Ernie Shaw	(United States) Ernie Shaw (United States) Norm Mosher (United States) Al Straub	?	?	-
DNQ	GT+2.0	78	(Canada) J. G. Racing	(Canada) Jacques Graham (United States) Gordon Johnson	Datsun 240Z	?	-
DNQ	GT+2.0	78	(Canada) J. G. Racing	(Canada) Jacques Graham (United States) Gordon Johnson	?	?	-
