= Matra-Simca MS670 =

1972 prototype race car

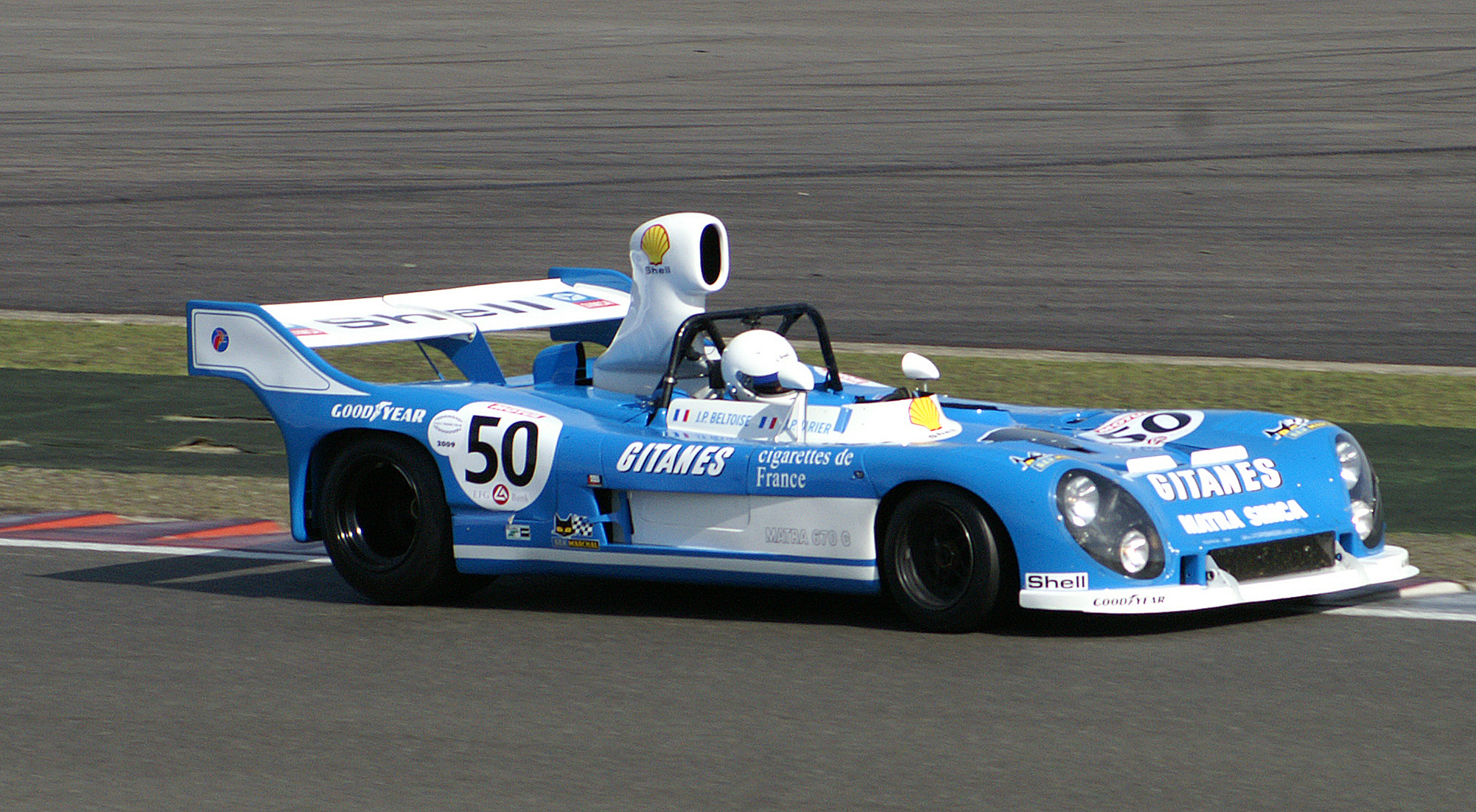
- Category: Group 5 Prototype
- Constructor: Matra
- Designer: Bernard Boyer
- Predecessor: Matra-Simca MS660C
- Successor: Matra-Simca MS680

Technical specifications
- Chassis: Fibreglass body on aluminium monocoque
- Suspension (front): Double wishbones, coil springs over dampers, anti-roll bar.
- Suspension (rear): 1972: Wishbones, trailing arms, coils over dampers, anti-roll bar. 1973-1974: twin lower links, single top links, twin trailing arms, coils over dampers, anti-roll bar.
- Axle track: Front: 1,525 mm (60.0 in); Rear: 1,500 mm (59.1 in)
- Wheelbase: 2,558 mm (100.7 in)
- Engine: Matra MS73, 2,993 cc (182.6 cu in), 60º V12, NA, Longitudinal, mid-mounted.
- Transmission: 1972: Matra 5-speed Manual. 1973-1974: Porsche 5-speed Manual.
- Weight: 1972: 700 kg (1,543.2 lb); 1973: 678 kg (1,494.7 lb); 1974: 675 kg (1,488.1 lb)
- Fuel: Shell

Competition history
- Notable entrants: Equipe Matra-Simca Shell; Équipe Gitanes
- Notable drivers: (France) Henri Pescarolo (United Kingdom) Graham Hill (France) François Cevert (New Zealand) Howden Ganley (France) Jean-Pierre Jabouille (France) Jean-Pierre Beltoise (New Zealand) Chris Amon (France) Gérard Larrousse (France) Jean-Pierre Jarier (Belgium) Jacky Ickx
- Debut: 1972 24 Hours of Le Mans
Races	Wins	Poles	F/Laps
20	15	16	1
- Teams' Championships: 2
- Constructors' Championships: 2

The Matra-Simca MS670 was a Group 5 prototype race car introduced in 1972 for the World Championship for Makes. The MS670 replaced the previous Matra-Simca MS660C.

== Racing history ==
=== 1972 ===
The MS670 only made one appearance in 1972, the 24 Hours of Le Mans. Matra entered four cars, Jean-Pierre Beltoise/Chris Amon in the older Matra-Simca MS660C, François Cevert/Howden Ganley, Henri Pescarolo/Graham Hill and Jean-Pierre Jabouille/David Hobbs. Hill/Pescarolo won the race by a lap from Cevert/Ganley. Beltoise/Amon retired with engine failure and Jabouille/Hobbs retired with a broken gearbox.

In the World Championship for Makes, Matra had scored twenty points, earning it seventh in the championship.

=== 1973 ===
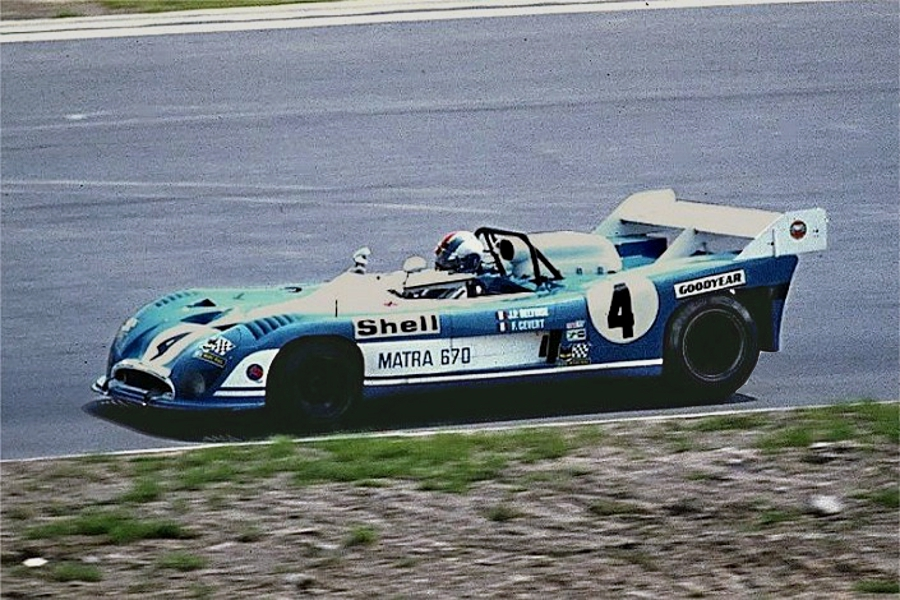
François Cevert in the MS670B sharing with Jean-Pierre Beltoise at the 1973 1000km of Nürburgring.

The first race of the season was the 1973 24 Hours of Daytona and Matra entered one car using the MS670 driven by Cevert/Beltoise/Pescarolo and retired from the race with engine failure. The driver line ups for the 1973 Vallelunga 6 Hours were Cevert/Beltoise and Cevert/Pescarolo/Gérard Larrousse, all drivers using the new Matra-Simca MS670B, Cevert/Pescarolo/Larrousse won and Cevert/Beltoise retired with engine failure. The driver line ups for the next two races, starting with the 1973 1000km of Dijon were Cevert/Beltoise and Pescarolo/Larrousse. Pescarolo/Larrousse won the race and Cevert/Beltoise finished third. The 1000km of Monza saw Pescarolo/Larrousse third and Cevert/Beltoise eleventh. The driver line ups for the 1000 km of Spa were Pescarolo/Amon/Hill and Pescarolo/Larrousse/Amon, Pescarolo/Larrousse/Amon finished third and Pescarolo/Amon/Hill retired with engine failure. The team skipped the Targa Florio but entered the 1000km of Nürburgring with Cevert/Beltoise and Pescarolo/Larrousse driving but both cars retired with engine failure. Matra entered four cars for the 24 Hours of Le Mans, Pescarolo/Larrousse, Cevert/Beltoise, Jabouille/Jean-Pierre Jaussaud and Patrick Depailler/Bob Wollek. Pescarolo/Larrousse won the race, Jabouille/Jaussaud finished third, Cevert/Beltoise retired with an accident caused by a puncture and Depailler/Wollek also retired with a broken oil pump and engine failure. The 1000km of Zeltweg returned to two cars with Pescarolo/Larrousse winning the race from Cevert/Beltoise. In the final race of the 1973 season, the Watkins Glen 6 Hours, Pescarolo/Larrousse won but Cevert/Beltoise retired with broken ignition.

In the World Championship for Makes, Matra had scored one hundred and twenty four points, earning it first-place in the standings.

=== 1974 ===
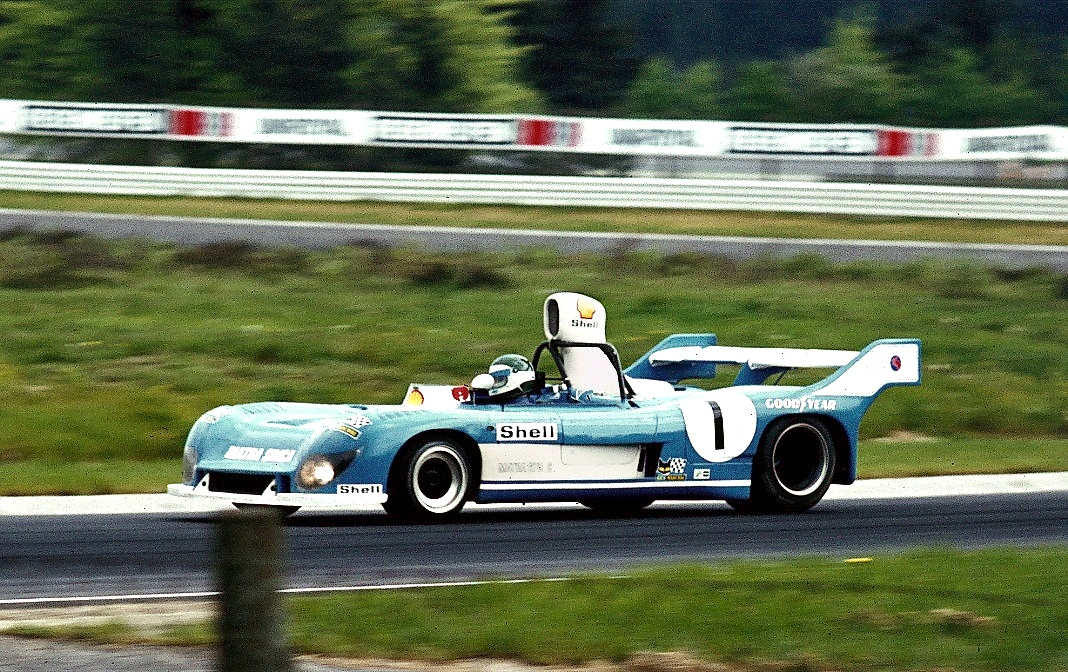
Jean-Pierre Jarier in the MS670C sharing with Jean-Pierre Beltoise at the 1974 1000km of Nürburgring.

The first race of the season was the 1000km of Monza and the driver line ups were Pescarolo/Larrousse and Beltoise/Jean-Pierre Jarier but both cars retired with engine failure using the new Matra-Simca MS670C. The driver line ups for the 1000 km of Spa were Jarier/Jacky Ickx and Pescarolo/Larrousse, Jarier/Ickx won the race and Pescarolo/Larrousse retired with a broken head gasket. The 1000km of Nürburgring saw Beltoise/Jarier and Pescarolo/Larrousse driving. Beltoise/Jarier won the race and Pescarolo/Larrousse finished fifth. Pescarolo/Larrousse won the 1000km of Imola and Beltoise/Jarier finished fourth. Matra entered four cars for the 24 Hours of Le Mans, Pescarolo/Larrousse, Jabouille/François Migault, Jaussaud/Wollek/José Dolhem and Beltoise/Jarier in the new Matra-Simca MS680. Pescarolo/Larrousse won the race, Jabouille/Migault finished third, both Jaussaud/Wollek/Dolhem and Beltoise/Jarier retired with engine failure. The 1000km of Zeltweg returned to two cars with Pescarolo/Larrousse winning the race and Beltoise/Jarier finishing third. The team returned to the MS670C for the remainder of the season. Beltoise/Jarier won the Watkins Glen 6 Hours and Pescarolo/Larrousse retired with a broken gear shift lever. In both the 1000km of Le Castellet and 1000km of Brands Hatch Beltoise/Jarier won from Pescarolo/Larrousse. For the final race of the 1974 season, the Kyalami 6 Hours, Pescarolo/Larrousse won from Beltoise/Jarier.

In the World Championship for Makes, Matra had scored one hundred and forty points, earning it first in the championship for the second consecutive season but at the end of the year Matra pulled out of motor racing.

== Complete World Championship for Makes results ==
Year	Entrant	Class	Drivers	No.	1	2	3	4	5	6	7	8	9	10	11	Points	WEMCP
1972	Equipe Matra-Simca Shell	Group 5			BAI	DAY	SEB	BRH	MZA	SPA	TGA	NÜR	LMS	ORC	WGN	20	7th
1972	Equipe Matra-Simca Shell	Group 5	(United Kingdom) Graham Hill										1			20	7th
1972	Equipe Matra-Simca Shell	Group 5	(France) Henri Pescarolo										1			20	7th
1972	Equipe Matra-Simca Shell	Group 5	(France) François Cevert										2			20	7th
1972	Equipe Matra-Simca Shell	Group 5	(New Zealand) Howden Ganley										2			20	7th
1972	Equipe Matra-Simca Shell	Group 5	(France) Jean-Pierre Jabouille										55			20	7th
1972	Equipe Matra-Simca Shell	Group 5	(United Kingdom) David Hobbs										55			20	7th
1973	Equipe Matra-Simca Shell	Group 5			DAY	VAL	DIJ	MZA	SPA	TGA	NÜR	LMS	ORC	WGN		124	1st
1973	Equipe Matra-Simca Shell	Group 5	(France) François Cevert		27	1 / 15	3	11			26	39	2	16		124	1st
1973	Equipe Matra-Simca Shell	Group 5	(France) Jean-Pierre Beltoise		27	15	3	11			26	39	2	16		124	1st
1973	Equipe Matra-Simca Shell	Group 5	(France) Henri Pescarolo		27	1	1	3	3 / 17		47	1	1	1		124	1st
1973	Equipe Matra-Simca Shell	Group 5	(France) Gérard Larrousse			1	1	3	3		47	1	1	1		124	1st
1973	Equipe Matra-Simca Shell	Group 5	(New Zealand) Chris Amon						3 / 17							124	1st
1973	Equipe Matra-Simca Shell	Group 5	(United Kingdom) Graham Hill						17							124	1st
1973	Equipe Matra-Simca Shell	Group 5	(France) Jean-Pierre Jabouille									3				124	1st
1973	Equipe Matra-Simca Shell	Group 5	(France) Jean-Pierre Jaussaud									3				124	1st
1973	Equipe Matra-Simca Shell	Group 5	(France) Patrick Depailler									46				124	1st
1973	Equipe Matra-Simca Shell	Group 5	(France) Bob Wollek									46				124	1st
1974	Équipe Gitanes	Group 5			MZA	SPA	NÜR	IMO	LMS	ORC	WGN	RIC	BRH	KYA		140	1st
1974	Équipe Gitanes	Group 5	(France) Jean-Pierre Beltoise		26		1	4		3	1	1	1	2		140	1st
1974	Équipe Gitanes	Group 5	(France) Jean-Pierre Jarier		26	1	1	4		3	1	1	1	2		140	1st
1974	Équipe Gitanes	Group 5	(Belgium) Jacky Ickx			1										140	1st
1974	Équipe Gitanes	Group 5	(France) Henri Pescarolo		39	25	5	1	1	1	15	2	2	1		140	1st
1974	Équipe Gitanes	Group 5	(France) Gérard Larrousse		39	25	5	1	1	1	15	2	2	1		140	1st
1974	Équipe Gitanes	Group 5	(France) Jean-Pierre Jabouille						3							140	1st
1974	Équipe Gitanes	Group 5	(France) François Migault						3							140	1st
1974	Équipe Gitanes	Group 5	(France) Jean-Pierre Jaussaud						34							140	1st
1974	Équipe Gitanes	Group 5	(France) José Dolhem						34							140	1st
1974	Équipe Gitanes	Group 5	(France) Bob Wollek						34							140	1st
