= 1000 km Zeltweg =

4 Hours of Red Bull Ring

European Le Mans Series
- Venue: Red Bull Ring
- First race: 1933
- First ELMS race: 2013
- Last race: 2021
- Duration: 4 Hours
- Previous names: 500 km Zeltweg; 1000 km Zeltweg

The 4 Hours of Red Bull Ring (originally known as the 500 km Zeltweg) was an endurance sports car event held near Spielberg, Austria. Originally based at the Zeltweg Airfield, the race moved to the Österreichring and was lengthened to a 1000 km distance and there it continued to be a regular event in the World Sportscar Championship until 1976.

== History ==
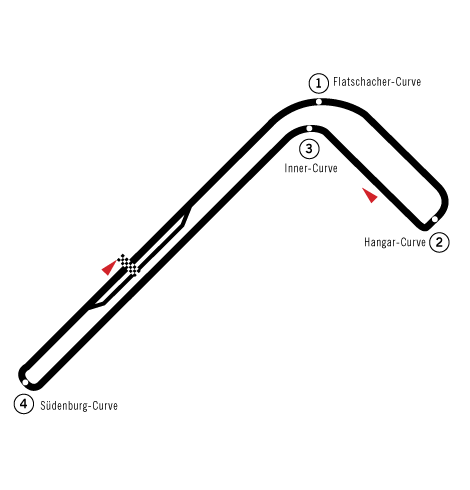
The Zeltweg Airfield circuit used from 1966 to 1968

The Österreichring, used from 1969 to 1976

The A1-Ring, used from 1997 to 2001

In 1963, Formula One held its first exhibition event at the Zeltweg Airfield, located in Styria. The airfield had been modified in 1958 to allow it to be used for motorsports, using the runway and taxiways for straights. Following the successful event, the Austrian Grand Prix joined the Formula One calendar for the 1964 season. However complaints from drivers about the poor surface led to the FIA abandoning the circuit before a 1965 event could be held. Left without a major event, the organizers turned to the World Sportscar Championship and offered a 500 km event to take place starting in 1966. This event proved more successful due to the ability of the sportscars to handle the bumpy surface better than a Formula One car.

In 1969, due to demands once again from racers for a better circuit, the Österreichring was built in the mountains less than a mile from Zeltweg Airfield. Once the new circuit was completed, the sports car event moved to its permanent home. Due to the freshness of the track, the organizers expanded the event to a 1000 km endurance. The smoothness of the new racing surface allowed for greater reliability and greater ease in achieving the longer distance. The high-speed nature of the layout also allowed for quick races, with some events running under five hours. However, with rule changes in the evolved World Championship of Makes in 1976, the event became limited to a maximum of six hours due to the decrease in overall speed of the competitors.

The 1976 event also became the final 1000 km race at the Österreichring. A second Austrian race was added to the separate World Sportscar Championship, held at the smaller Salzburgring. Due to safety concerns and a shrinking schedule, the Österreichring was dropped from the 1977 season, leaving the Salzburgring one final event before it too was abandoned, marking the final Austrian event in the World Sportscar Championship.

Following the rebuilding of the Österreichring into the new A1-Ring in 1997, the FIA GT Championship briefly resurrected the sportscar endurance race in a modified form. A four-hour event was run in 1997 covering nearly 700 km, followed by 500 km races in 1998, 2000, and 2001. The FIA chose not to return to the circuit after the 2001 event, and the A1-Ring was eventually partially torn down in 2004, until it was rebuilt as Red Bull Ring in 2011.

== Winners ==
Year	Drivers	Team	Car	Time
Zeltweg Airfield
1966	(West Germany) Gerhard Mitter (West Germany) Hans Herrmann	(West Germany) Porsche System	Porsche 906	3:07:52:550
1967	(Australia) Paul Hawkins	(Australia) Paul Hawkins	Ford GT40 Mk.II	3:15:54.530
1968	(Switzerland) Jo Siffert	(West Germany) Porsche System Engineering	Porsche 908	2:55:17.790
Österreichring
1969	(Switzerland) Jo Siffert (West Germany) Kurt Ahrens Jr.	(West Germany) Freiherr von Wendt	Porsche 917	5:23:36.980
1970	(Switzerland) Jo Siffert (United Kingdom) Brian Redman	(United Kingdom) J.W. Automotive	Porsche 917K	5:08:04:670
1971	(Mexico) Pedro Rodríguez (United Kingdom) Richard Attwood	(United Kingdom) J.W. Automotive	Porsche 917K	5:04:26.100
1972	(Belgium) Jacky Ickx (United Kingdom) Brian Redman	(Italy) SpA Ferrari SEFAC	Ferrari 312 PB	4:58:46.280
1973	(France) Henri Pescarolo (France) Gérard Larrousse	(France) Equipe Matra-Simca	Matra-Simca MS670B	4:48:57.800
1974	(France) Henri Pescarolo (France) Gérard Larrousse	(France) Equipe Gitanes	Matra-Simca MS670C	4:51:20.270
1975	(France) Henri Pescarolo (United Kingdom) Derek Bell	(West Germany) Willi Kauhsen Racing Team	Alfa Romeo T33/TT/12	3:34:50.550^{†}
1976	(Austria) Dieter Quester (Sweden) Gunnar Nilsson	(West Germany) Schnitzer BMW	BMW 3.0 CSL	6:00:16.400
A1-Ring
1997	(Germany) Klaus Ludwig (Germany) Bernd Mayländer	(Germany) AMG-Mercedes	Mercedes-Benz CLK GTR	4:00:55.816
1998	(Germany) Klaus Ludwig (Brazil) Ricardo Zonta	(Germany) AMG-Mercedes	Mercedes-Benz CLK LM	2:47:34.975
2000	(Netherlands) Mike Hezemans (Netherlands) Tom Coronel	(Netherlands) Carsport Holland	Chrysler Viper GTS-R	3:00:01.811
2001	(Netherlands) Peter Kox (Sweden) Rickard Rydell	(United Kingdom) Prodrive Allstars	Ferrari 550-GTS Maranello	3:00:09.952
Red Bull Ring
2013	(France) Pierre Thiriet (Switzerland) Mathias Beche	(France) Thiriet by TDS Racing	Oreca 03	3:00:09.351
2014	(France) Paul-Loup Chatin (France) Nelson Panciatici (United Kingdom) Oliver Webb	(France) Signatech Alpine	Alpine A450b	4:00:16.248
2015	(Portugal) Filipe Albuquerque (United Kingdom) Simon Dolan (United Kingdom) Harry Tincknell	(United Kingdom) Jota Sport	Gibson 015S	4:00:21.546
2016	(France) Pierre Thiriet (Switzerland) Mathias Beche (Japan) Ryō Hirakawa	(France) Thiriet by TDS Racing	Oreca 05	4:00:04.366
2017	(United Kingdom) Will Owen (Switzerland) Hugo de Sadeleer (Portugal) Filipe Albuquerque	(United States) United Autosports	Ligier JS P217	4:00:57.876
2018	(Russia) Roman Rusinov (France) Andrea Pizzitola (France) Jean-Éric Vergne	(Russia) G-Drive Racing	Oreca 07	4:00:14.242
2021	(Poland) Robert Kubica (Switzerland) Louis Delétraz (China) Yifei Ye	(Belgium) Team WRT	Oreca 07	4:00:49.743

† - The 1975 event was scheduled for 1000 km, but was stopped after 600 km due to heavy rain.
