= Ferrari 312 PB =

Sports car

Ferrari 312 P
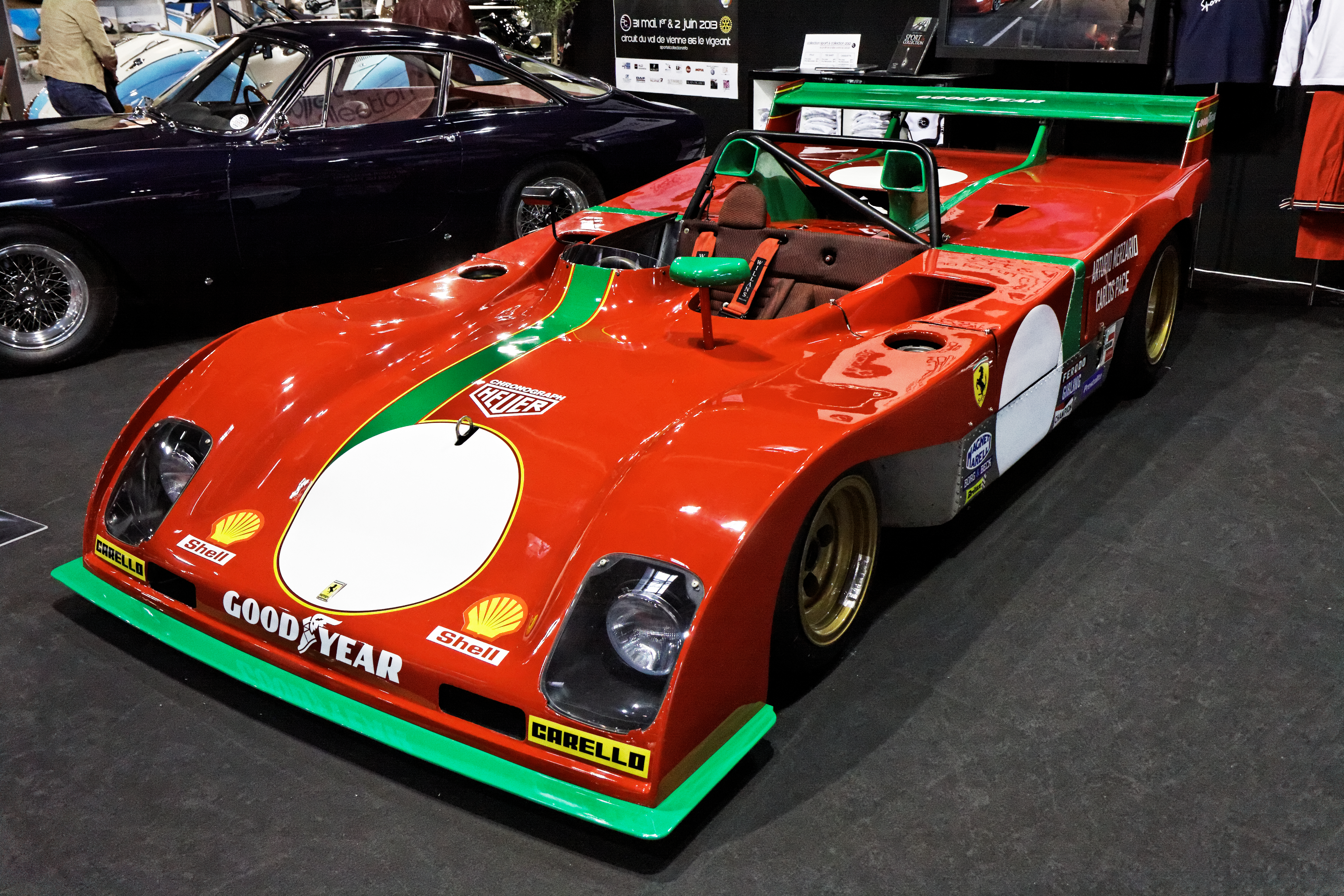
- 1972 Ferrari 312 PB
- Category: 1971: Group 6; 1972-73: Group 5
- Constructor: Scuderia Ferrari
- Designers: Mauro Forghieri; Giacomo Caliri
- Predecessor: Ferrari 312 P
- Successor: Ferrari 333SP

Technical specifications
- Chassis: Aluminium central monocoque with steel spaceframe front and rear
- Suspension (front): Double wishbone, outboard coil spring/damper
- Suspension (rear): Single top-link, reversed lower wishbone, twin radius arms, outboard spring/damper
- Engine: Ferrari Tipo 001 2,991 cubic centimetres (182.5 cu in; 2.991 L) DOHC flat-12, naturally aspirated, mid-mounted
- Transmission: Ferrari 5-speed manual
- Power: 460 brake horsepower (470 PS; 340 kW) @ 10,800 rpm 399 pound-feet (541 N⋅m)
- Weight: 665 kilograms (1,466 lb)
- Fuel: Shell
- Tyres: Firestone/Goodyear

Competition history
- Notable entrants: Scuderia Ferrari
- Notable drivers: (Sweden) Ronnie Peterson; (Belgium) Jacky Ickx; (Switzerland) Clay Regazzoni; (United Kingdom) Brian Redman; (United States) Mario Andretti; (Italy) Arturo Merzario; (Italy) Sandro Munari; (Australia) Tim Schenken; (Argentina) Carlos Reutemann; (Brazil) Carlos Pace
- Debut: 1971 1000 km Buenos Aires
Entries	Races	Wins	Podiums	Poles
72	33	15	21	17
- Constructors' Championships: 1 (1972 WSC)

Ferrari 312 PB at Goodwood Festival of Speed 2010

The Ferrari 312 PB was a Group 6 prototype sports car introduced in 1971 by Italian carmaker Ferrari. It was officially designated the 312 P, but often known as the 312 PB to avoid confusion with a previous car of the same name. It was part of the Ferrari P series of Prototype-Sports Cars but was redesignated as a Group 5 Sports Car for 1972.

== Development ==
In 1970, a change in the regulations for sportscar racing for 1972 was announced. The loophole for sports cars like Porsche 917, Ferrari 512, Ford GT40 and Lola T70, which could have engines up to 5 litre if a least 25 were made, was closed. The minimum weight of the 3-litre prototypes was raised to 650 kg (1,433 lb). Porsche considered this too heavy as their Porsche 908/03 were 100 kg (220 lb) lighter, and this advantage would have been lost. On the other hand, their air-cooled two-valve engine was low on power with 370 hp (276 kW), and the development of a new normally aspirated race engine would have been necessary. In the following years, Porsche focussed on the nearly 10 year old 911, Can-Am and turbocharging. The factory did not enter world championship sports car races from 1972 to 1975 and sold the 908s to customers who would have to add weight to them. Matra and Alfa Romeo were willing and able to compete, but only in selected seasons or events. Also, Ford's successful Formula 1 Cosworth-V8 engine was available for independent chassis builders, but vibrations made it unreliable for endurance racing as the 1968 Ford P68 had shown.

After the 512S had mostly been beaten by the Porsche 917 during 1970, Ferrari had modified the S to the 917K-like 512M late in the season, but then abandoned further development of the M, leaving all 512 to customer teams like Penske Racing, NART and privateers.

Instead, using 1971 as a test season, Ferrari focused on a new 3.0L prototype based on the Tipo 001 flat-12 "Boxer" engine from the 312B F1 car. Officially this design was known as 312P, the motorsports press appending the B to avoid confusion with the earlier 312P standard V12 cars. This design was similar to the flat-12 Porsche 917 engine layout with its low center of gravity, but Ferrari used water-cooling and 4-valve heads. The car was promising, but did not win, while the similar Alfa Romeo 33/3 V8 scored three world championship wins against Porsche's 917 and 908 dominance. The 312PB's engine has many similarities in design to the F1 engine, but nearly every part is different and non-interchangeable with the F1 flat 12. This has led to problems for users of these cars in historic racing, as spare parts for these quite fragile engines, are, in comparison to the F1 flat 12 engine, very difficult to obtain.

== Racing history ==
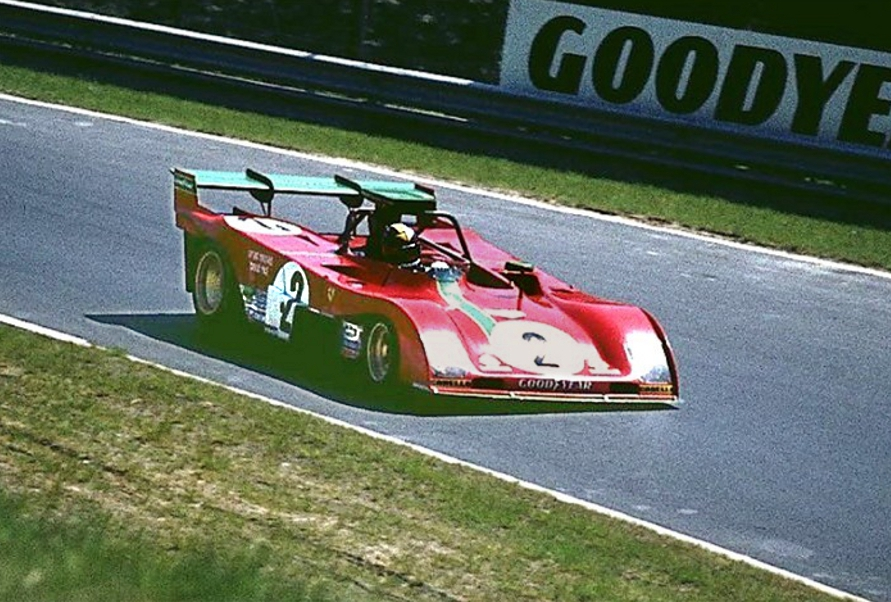
Carlos Pace driving a 312 PB at the Nürburgring in 1973

The car first appeared at the 1971 1000 km of Buenos Aires in Argentina at the hands of Italians Ignazio Giunti and Arturo Merzario. Its history started off tragically when Giunti was killed in this race after he hit Jean-Pierre Beltoise's Matra head-on while the Frenchman was pushing the stricken car back to the pits. The car did not win a race that season. In 1972, with only Alfa answering the challenge, the 312 PB was very successful and won all World Sportscar Championship races in which it was entered. Ferrari skipped Le Mans, though, as the F1-based engine had not lasted 24 hours in testing and would surely spoil their otherwise perfect record.

In 1973, Matra which had previously focused on Le Mans also challenged for the championship while Alfa was absent. As Matra won several races, Ferrari needed to enter in the 1973 24 Hours of Le Mans, with an improved yet still doubtful engine. One car was used as a "hare" which supposed to lure the Matras into driving faster laps than they intended, to test their reliability. Ironically it was only the "hare" Ferrari which survived the 24 hours, finishing a respectable second behind a Matra. The championship saw the same order, with only two Italian wins compared to five French. In addition, despite the absence of the Matras, the 312 PB could not defend the 1972 win of the Targa Florio as the proper sports prototypes of Ferrari and Alfa failed and a modified Porsche 911 Carrera RSR collected another not-so-surprise win after qualifying 5th. The 10 year old roadgoing Porsche model already had won the 1973 24 Hours of Daytona.

At the end of the 1973 season, Ferrari abandoned sports car racing to focus on F1 again, as the F1 team had even skipped some GP races in 1973 due to lack of competitiveness.

== Bibliography ==
- Bamsey, Ian (1 October 1986). Ferrari 312 & 512 Sports Racing Cars: The Porsche Hunters. G T Foulis & Co Ltd. ISBN 978-0-85429-577-7.
- Collins, Peter; McDonough, Ed (1 November 2009). Ferrari 312P & 312PB (WSC Giants). Veloce Publishing. ISBN 978-1-84584-259-8.
