= Mirage (race car) =

British race car of the 1960s and 1970s

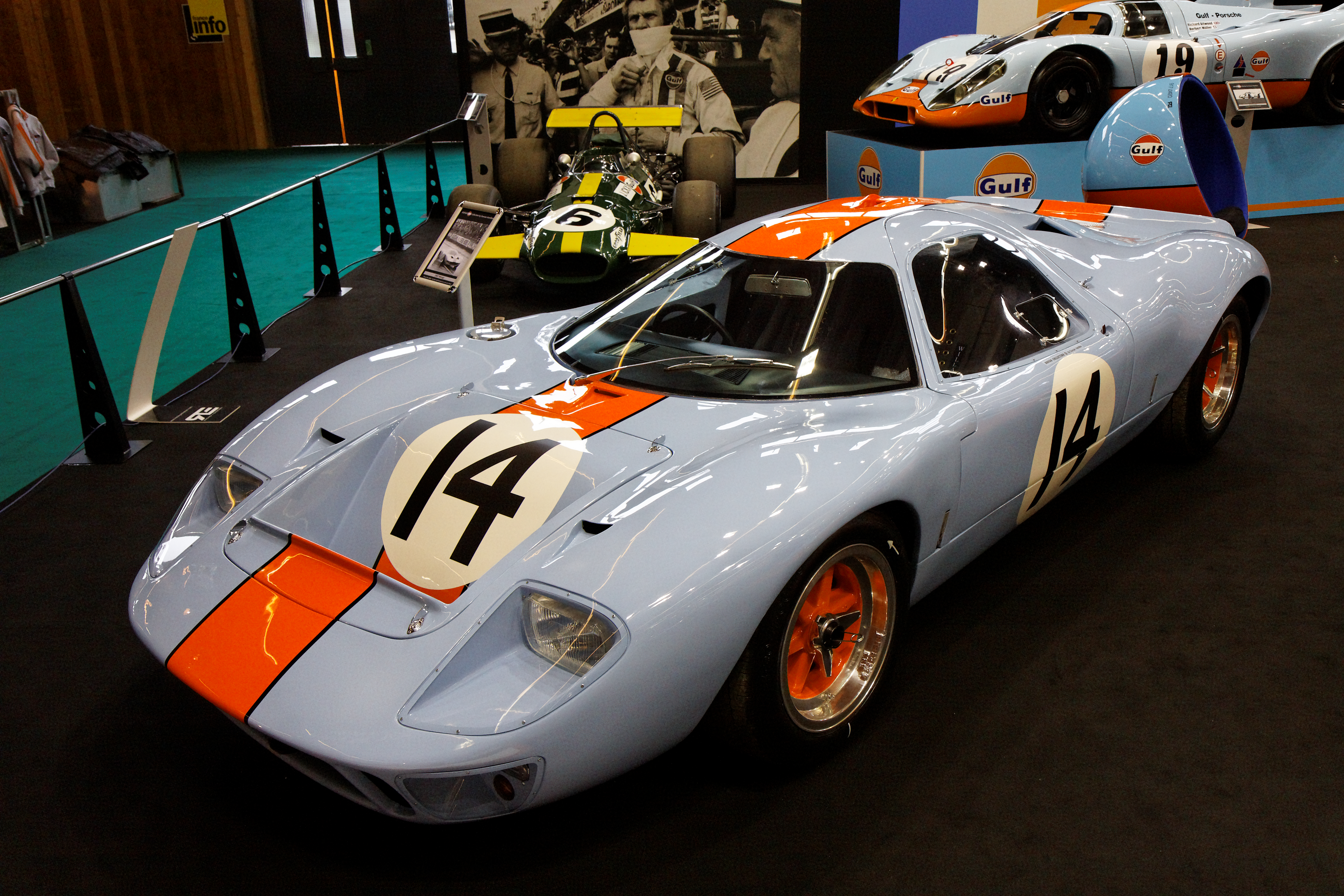
1967 Mirage M1

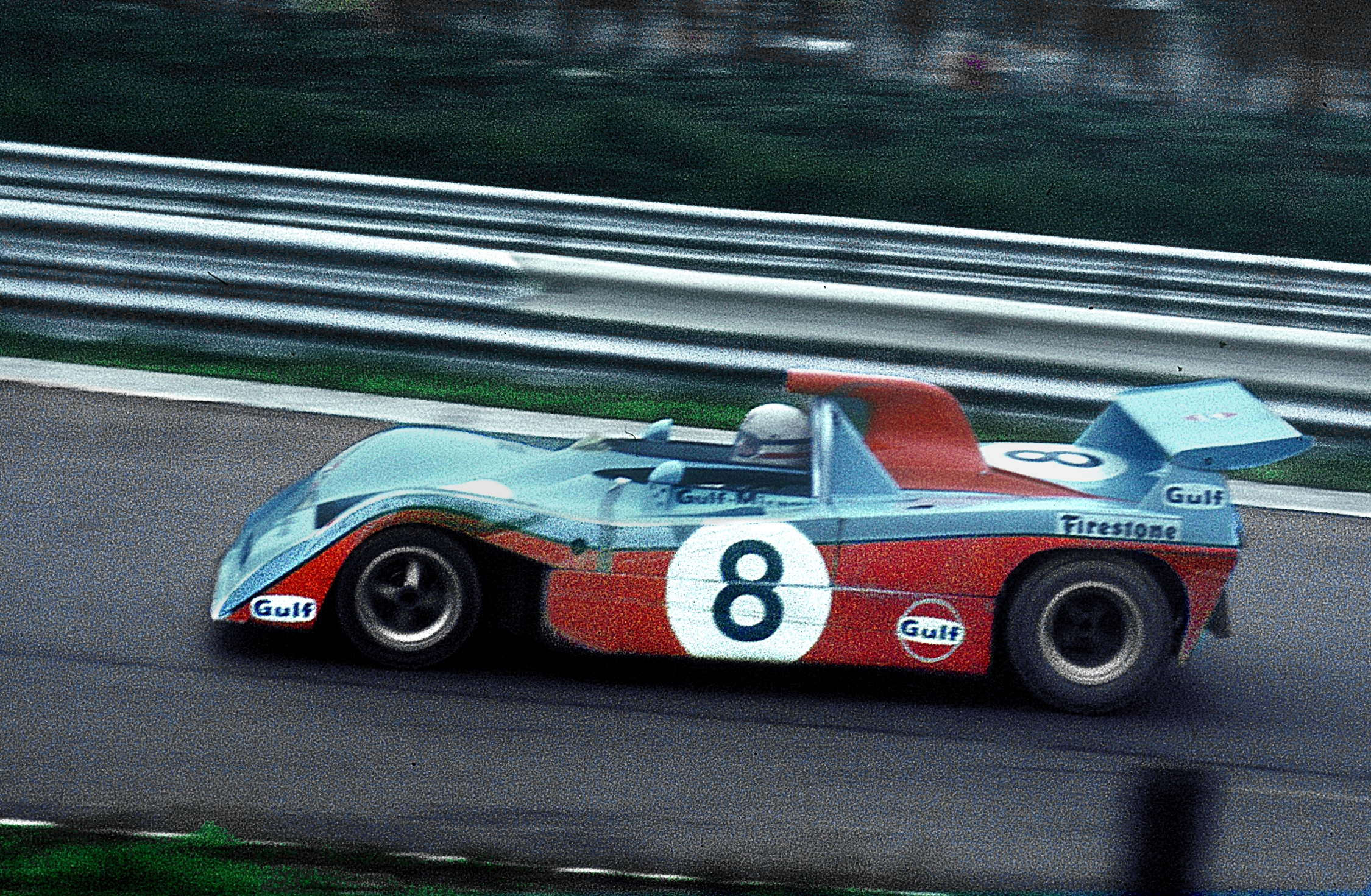
1973 Mirage M6

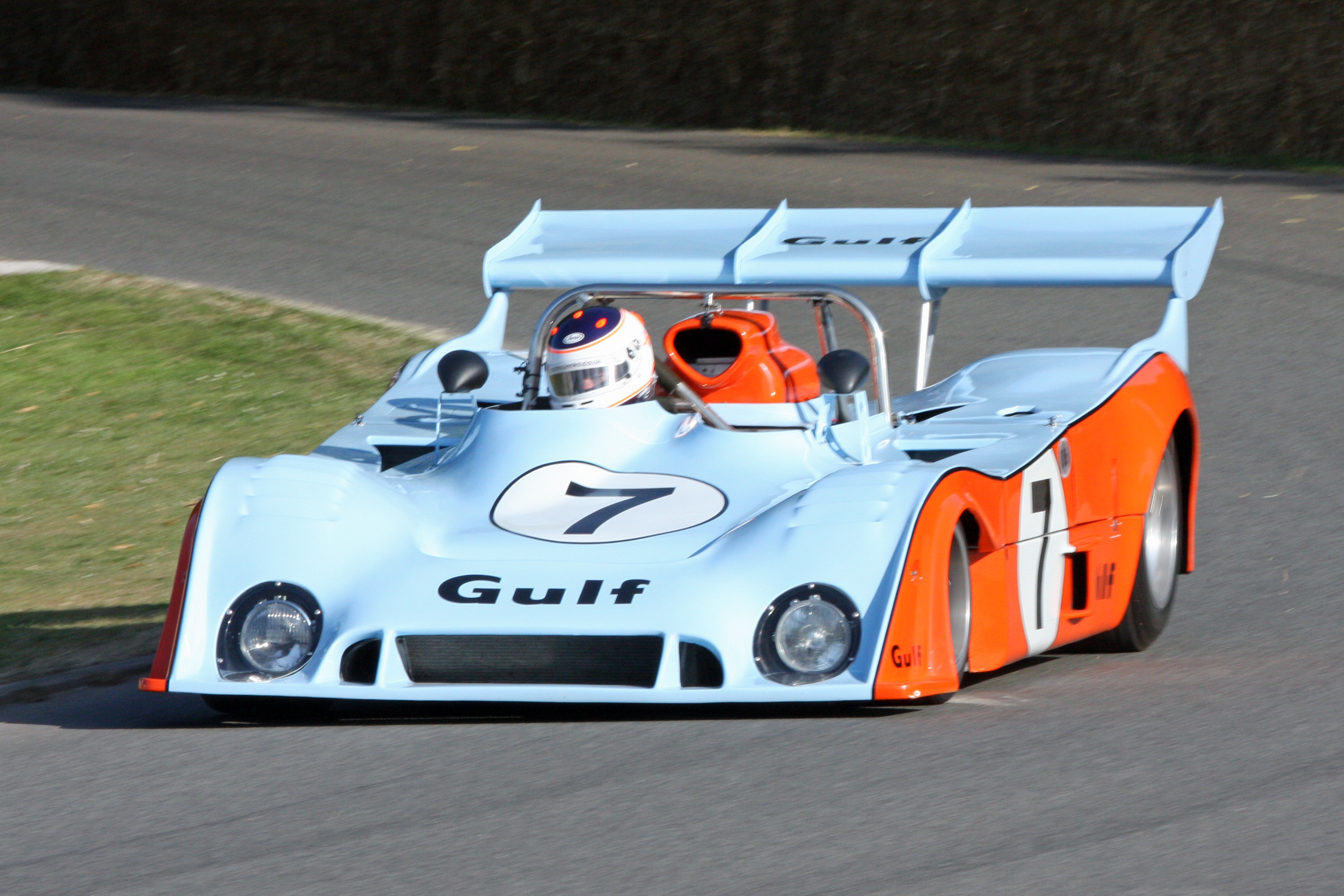
1974 Gulf GR7

The Mirage Lightweight Racing Car was a family of race cars built by J.W. Automotive Engineering (JWAE) at Slough in England, initially to compete in international sports car races in the colours of the Gulf Oil Corporation.

In all, from 1974 to 1978, the Mirages never finished outside of the top-ten positions at Le Mans, posting a first, two seconds, a third, a fourth, a fifth, and a tenth. Mirage race cars were the first to wear the legendary powder blue and marigold livery of Gulf Oil, the first to post race wins for Gulf Oil, and the last to win the 24 Hours of Le Mans overall for Gulf Oil.

Mirage is one of only two independently constructed racing car marques (the other is Rondeau) to win the 24 Hours of Le Mans overall since the post-World War II return of the Grand Prix d’Endurance in 1949.

== History ==
The Mirage Lightweight Racing Car was a family of racing cars built by John Wyer Automotive Engineering (JWAE) in Slough, England, initially to compete in international sports car racing in the colors of the Gulf Oil Corporation. The project started in the spring of 1967, after Ford's decision to discontinue the Ford GT40 project.

During the preliminary tests for the 24 Hours of Le Mans, two seeming Ford GT40s in the colors of Gulf oil appeared. They were in fact Mirages based on the Ford GT 40 Mk I, which Ford had discontinued in favour of a newer car.

John Wyer bought an old project by Len Bailey, an English designer, which aimed to improve the aerodynamics, mass and suspensions of the Mk Is. The Mirage M1 made its first run on March 21, 1967. Le Mans was its first real test.

The team had won the 1,000 kilometers of Spa and continued its winning series in Sweden, Paris and Kyalami. In the preliminary LeMans tests, the two M1s did better than the GT40s but gave up in the race.

A total of three M1s were produced. M10001 is the only surviving M1 chassis to date, while M10003 was reverted to one of three original "Light weight" Gulf GT40s to be campaigned for 1968 and 1969 (P/1074). M10002 was destroyed beyond repair after Dr. Dick Thompson had an accident during practice at the 1967 Nurburgring 1000 km. In spite of claims that chassis M10002 was rebuilt and rebadged as GT40 chassis P1075, the very car that won Le Mans in 1968 and 1969, it has been proven that chassis P1075 was a completely new chassis that received some parts from M10002, as well as upgrades developed during the M1 program.

In 1972, John Wyer took over the project to participate in the World Sportscar Championship and replace the Porsche 917, which no longer met the new regulations. After three years of development, a Mirage GR8 won the 1975 24 Hours of Le Mans.

Following this victory, Gulf and John Wyer decided to withdraw from competition. The structure was taken over by Harley Cluxton III, which raced the Renault V6 turbo GR8 in 1976 and 1977.

Along with Rondeau, Mirage is one of only two independently built racing car marques to win the 24 Hours of Le Mans overall since the return of endurance racing after World War II in 1949.

In total, from 1974 to 1978, the Mirages never finished outside the top ten places at Le Mans, posting one first, two seconds, third, fourth, fifth and tenth place. Mirage race cars were the first to wear Gulf Oil's legendary powder blue and Marigold (a yellow-orange) livery, the first to claim victories for Gulf Oil and the last to win the 24 Hours of Le Mans overall for Gulf Oil.

== M1 ==
For the 1967 season, JWAE built and raced the M1, a sports prototype based on the Ford GT40. With the fierce Ford vs. Ferrari battle continuing into 1967, along with Jim Hall’s Chaparrals, JWAE (formerly FAV, until the facility was sold to John Willment and John Wyer after the 1966 season) believed the MkI GT40 was quite reliable, yet too heavy and underpowered to battle for overall victory. Using a standard MkI chassis, they began changing elements such as the green house, and the front bulkhead being squared off. A more sleek take on the GT40’s body now draped over the chassis, along with carbon fiber used in conjunction with the fiberglass body parts, a first in all of automotive racing. This technique of carbon and fiberglass would carry on to the 1968 and 1969 GT40’s JWAE raced, as well as privateer cars built within that time (chassis P1074 to Chassis P1084) A 289 V8 engine was first used, but by Le Mans, it had housed various capacities up to 5.7 litres.

In the beginning of 1967, the Mirage was not finished being built in time for the first two rounds of the World Sports-car Championship, and so Grady Davis’s own GT40 was used instead (chassis P1049), posting a 6th overall at the Daytona 24hr, and a DNF at Sebring. When the Mirage was unveiled, it now sported the powder blue and marigold livery instead of the deep metallic blue, this color combination would become infamous with Gulf Oil Racing. The highlight of the M1's short racing career was without doubt the victory in the rain soaked 1967 Spa-Francorchamps 1000 km by Jacky Ickx and Dick Thompson, as well as the Kyalami 9hr. At the end of the 1967 season, Group 6 cars of capacities over 5 litres and under 50 production models were banned, an attempt by the FIA to stop the soaring speeds and development costs attributed to Fords program. JWAE attempted to persuade officials that the Mirage was in fact a reworked GT40 to allow it to participate in the Group 4 category for 1968, but to no avail, and so the Mirage M1 no longer raced in the WSC. Of the 3 Mirage M1’s built, only 1 survives today in its original design.

M10001 - DNF’d all WSC races in 1967. wins at Skarpnack Stockholmsloppet (a local race that was more of a marketing exercise for Gulf’s Swedish division), and the 9hr. Kyalami race. M10001 would repeat their win at the 9hr. Kyalami in 1968 before Malcolm Guthrie would purchase it due to his GT40 couldn’t be repaired in time for a series he raced in. Malcolm would continue to race it with great success into the 1970’s. M10001 became the most used of the 3 chassis, and remain a M1 chassis today.

M10002 - arrived and used at 1967 Le Mans test days but had several issues, posting a 32nd fastest time. It would then achieve 9th overall at Monza 1000km, but was written off the following race after a hard crash into a stationary Ginetta during practice for the Nurburgring 1000km race.

M10003 - first win for a JWAE and for the Mirage moniker (1967 Spa, Karlskoga and Montlhery). For 1968, it was built into a “lightweight” GT40 (P1074). Only win in GT40 configuration at the 1968 Monza 1000km, later used as a camera car for the film “Le Mans”. Today the car remains in its P1074 version.

== M2, M3 ==
The M2 was built in 1968 for the new 3 Litre Group 6 Prototype class, but the BRM V12 powered cars were rarely raced and met with no success. The revised and roofless M3 of 1969 was powered by the Ford Cosworth DFV V8 but again this model saw little use, JWA having largely concentrated on racing Ford GT40s during these two years.

== M4, M5 ==
The M4 was a roadster conceived between the end of 1969 and the beginning of 1970 coupling M3 chassis with a 5-liter Ford GT40 engine, but development of this particular car was stopped once JWAE signed the agreement with Porsche to use their 917 for the 1970 season, while in 1969 M5, a Formula Ford single seater, was built, and raced during 1970 British F.Ford season under Willment Group banner. Many fans got confused about M4-M5 denomination due to John Horsmann calling M5 the roadster and M4 the single seater.

== M6 ==
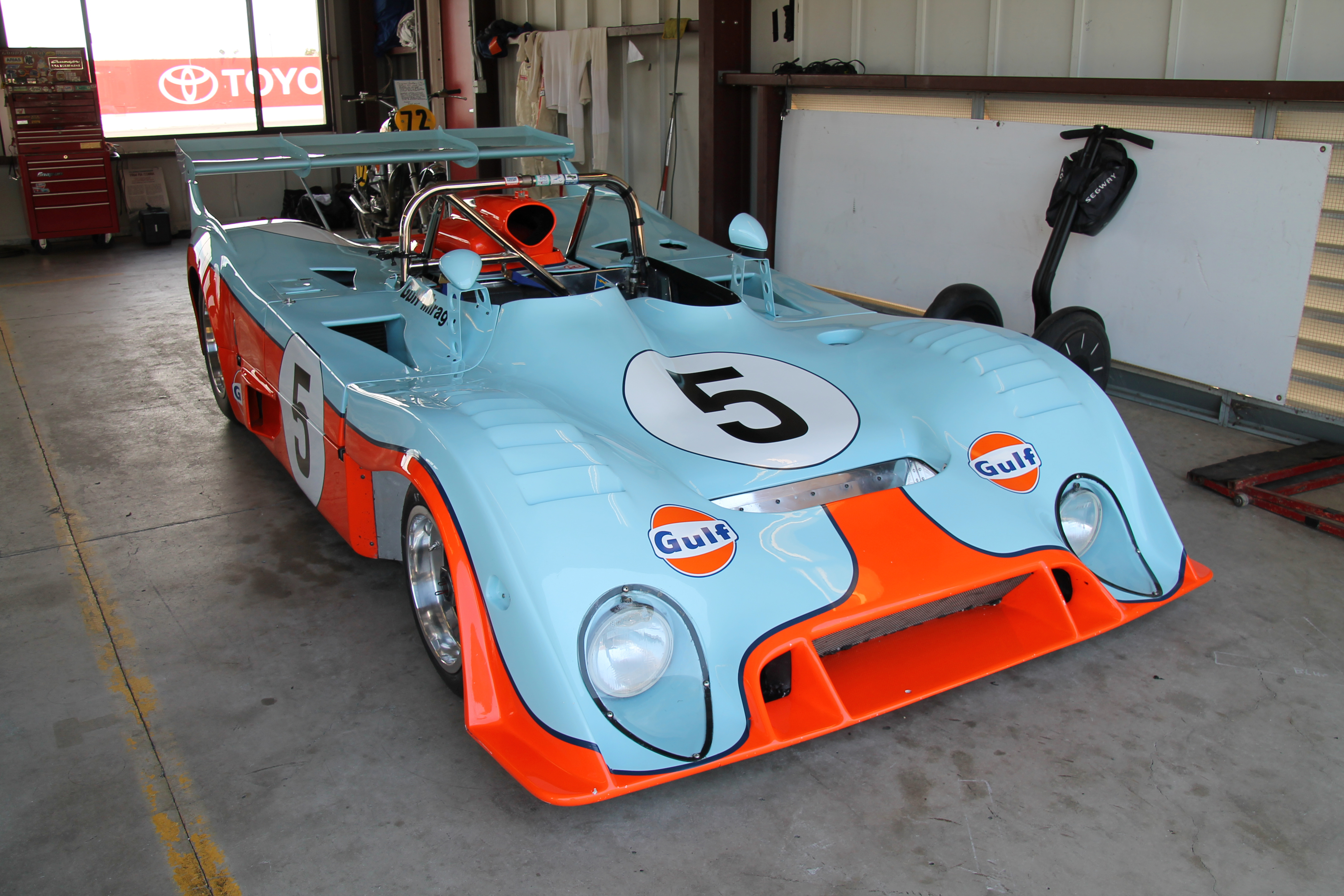
1972 Mirage M6

After competing with Porsche 917s during the 1970 & 1971 seasons, JWAE developed the new Ford Cosworth powered M6 model to race as a Group 5 Sports Car in the new World Championship for Makes from 1972.

At the end of the 1971 season big "5-liter sports cars" like Porsche 917 and Ferrari 512 were banned, leaving the scene to nimbler "3 liter prototypes" and JWAE was ready with a new project from Len Bailey: the M6. The M6 consisted of a steel reinforced riveted aluminium chassis coupled with a detuned 3 liter Cosworth DFV Formula 1 engine as a stressed member, and covered by open fiberglass bodywork with a large rear wing: the first chassis was completed in March 1972 and raced at 12 Hours of Sebring, the second car was completed halfway into the season, and the third was used to test Weslake V12 engine. While heavier, the Weslake V12 was expected to be smoother and more powerful than the Cosworth, whose strong vibrations caused many reliability issues. Again the only victory was at Spa, in the 1973 Spa-Francorchamps 1000 km. Apart from this win, the 1973 season was less than successful. Most of the teams resources were dedicated to Weslake V12 engine development, which did not prove better than the Cosworth, and led to the end of the program with four chassis out of five rebuilt as GR7.

The M6 Coupé was the closed version with low-drag bodywork and powered by the 2995 cc Ford-Weslake V12 engine planned to be used at 1973 24 Hours of Le Mans: poor performances (laptimes were 16 seconds slower than M6-Cosworth) ended the project.

== GR7 ==
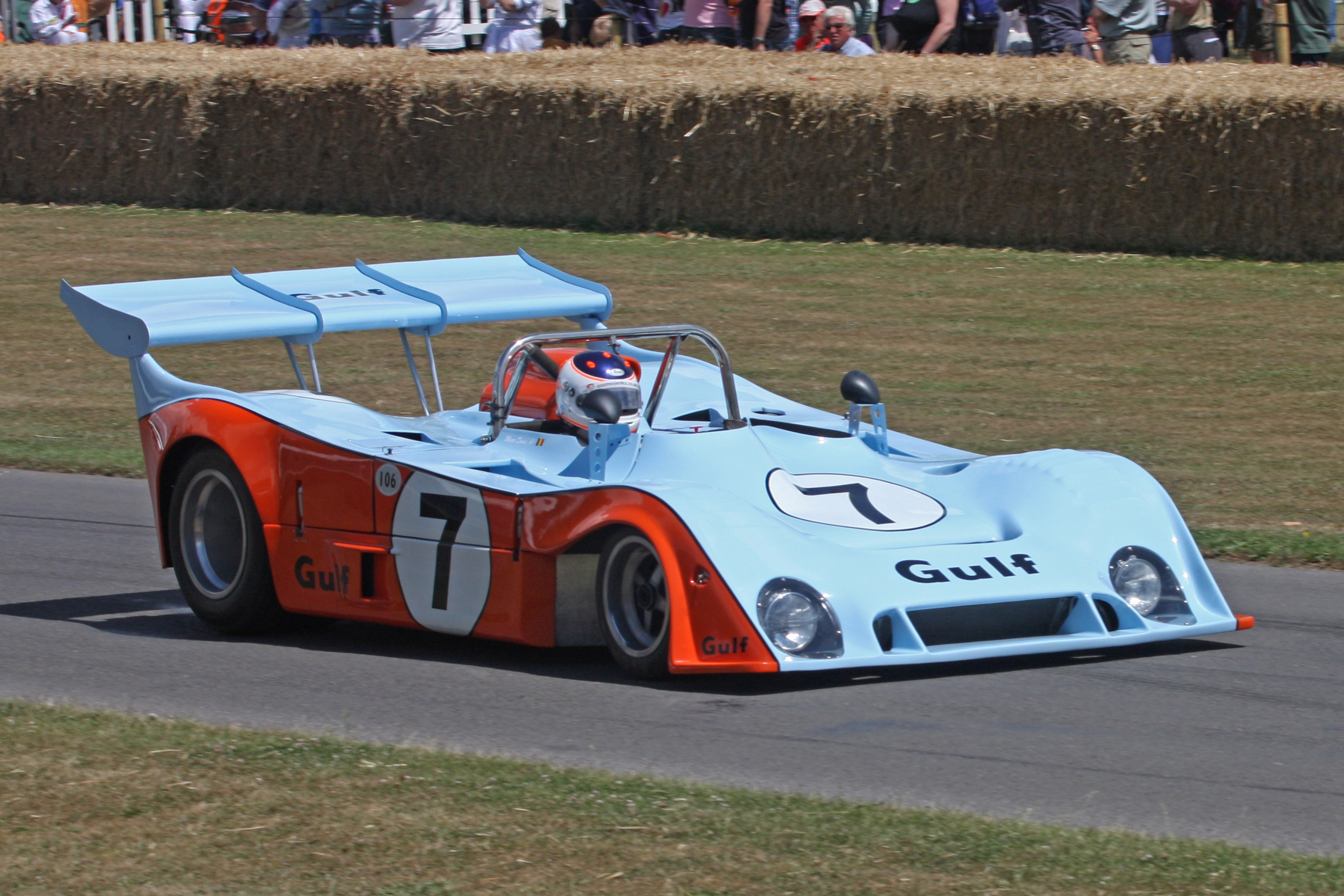
Mirage GR7

The GR7 model was renamed to Gulf GR7 for 1974, reflecting the sponsorship involvement of Gulf Oil which dated from 1967. "Gulf Ford" placed second in the 1974 World Championship for Makes.

== GR8 ==
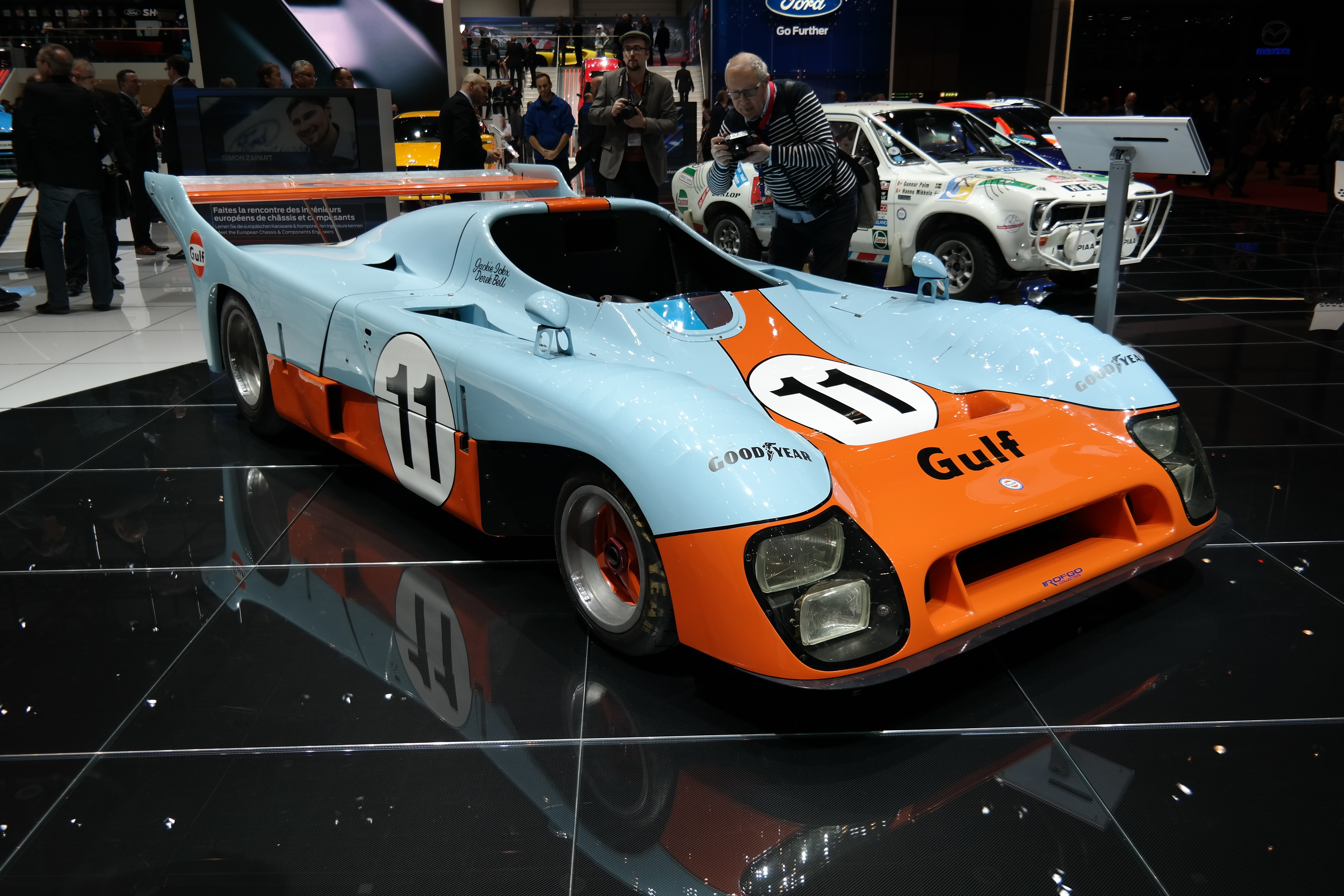
Gulf GR8 front-view

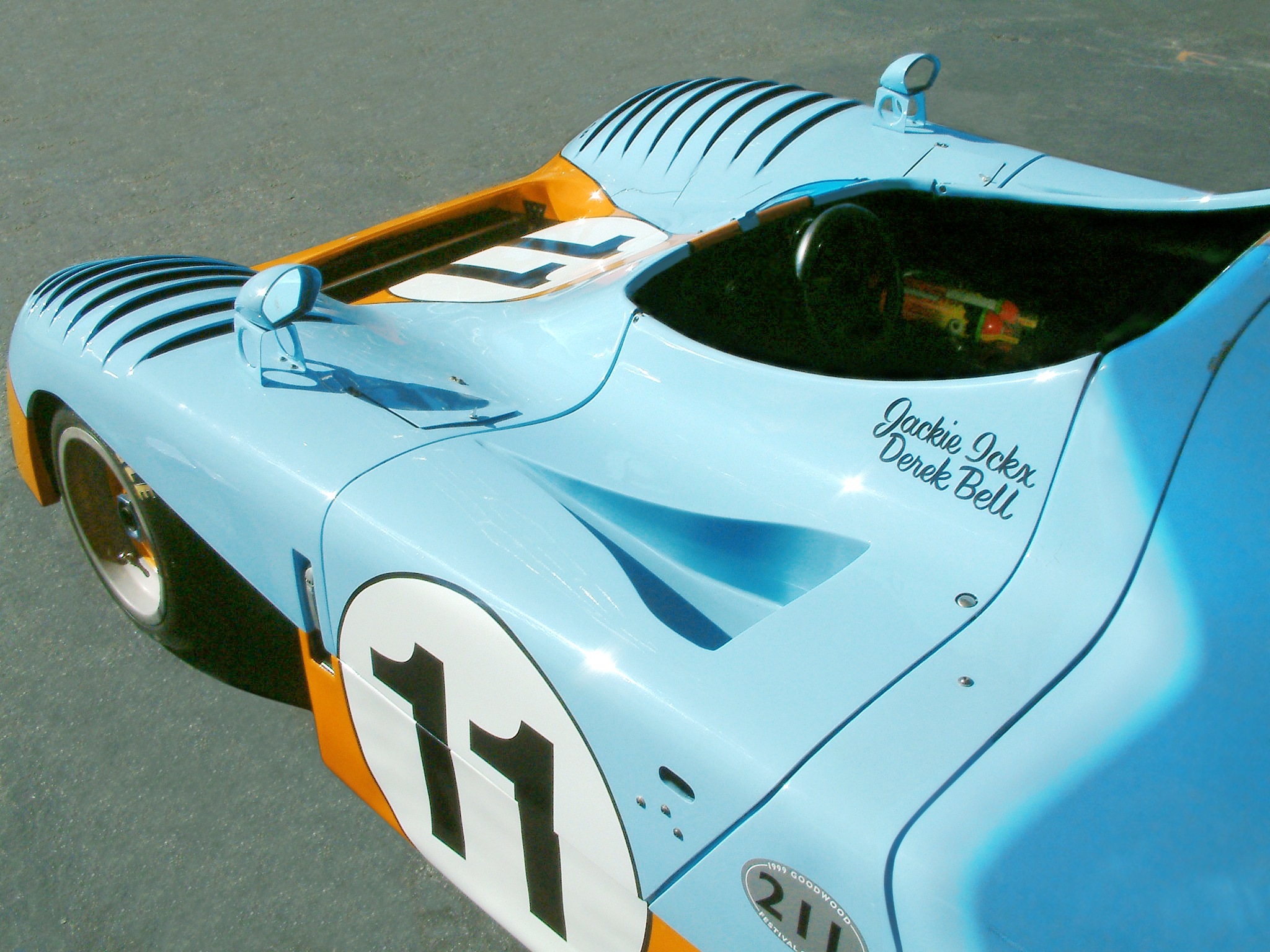
Gulf GR8

In 1975 the team obtained its last victory in the 24 Hours of Le Mans with the GR8 driven by Jacky Ickx and Derek Bell. The other car finished third with Vern Schuppan and Jean-Pierre Jaussaud. The race was excluded from the World Championship for Makes by the CSI because of new fuel consumption rules introduced for the race in the wake of the oil crisis.

Jean-Louis Lafosse and François Migault both finished second in the 1976 24 Hours of Le Mans.

In 1977 the car was fitted with a Renault 2 L (120 cu in) turbo V6 engine to replace the naturally aspirated Cosworth DFV 3 L (180 cu in) V8.

Vern Schuppan and Jean-Pierre Jarier finished second in the 1977 24 Hours of Le Mans.

== M8 ==
Upon Gulf Oil’s sponsorship withdrawal from international sports car racing in late 1975, American entrepreneur and former racing driver Harley Cluxton III purchased the Mirage team and all associated manufacturing rights from John Wyer and the Gulf Research Racing Company. As a Group 6 Prototype entrant, Cluxton continued successfully contesting the Mirages at Le Mans as a two car team. With primary sponsorship from JCB Excavators, Elf Lubricants, and Renault Sport, and under the continued management of John Horsman and counsel of John Wyer, the Mirage M8 finished second overall in both 1976 (Cosworth engine) and 1977 (Renault engine), behind Porsche’s factory Martini 936s.

== M9 ==
The M9 of 1978 featured a new open long-tail body and was powered by a turbocharged 2.1 liter 6 cylinder Renault engine. Two examples started in the 1978 24 Hours of Le Mans with one gaining tenth place.

== M10 ==
The M10 of 1979 used an updated M8 chassis with revised open long-tail body and a 3-liter Ford Cosworth DFV engine. Two M10s were entered in the 1979 24 Hours of Le Mans by Grand Touring Cars Inc / Ford Concessionaires France, officially as Ford M10s. Neither car finished.

== M12 ==
The last Mirage to be constructed was the M12, a Group C prototype featuring an aluminum honeycomb monocoque and Cosworth 3.9 liter DFL engine. The car was designed by John Horsman and built by Tiga. Entered at the 1982 24 Hours of Le Mans with Mario Andretti and son Michael Andretti co-driving for the first time, the car was ultimately disqualified 20 minutes prior to the start of the race for a technical infraction relating to the placement of an oil cooler. Much controversy surrounded the ACO's decision, with many citing organizational politics as the cause. Though the M12 showed great potential as both a Group C and IMSA GTP competitor, the program was aborted after Le Mans. 2 chassis were built and one car was used in IMSA GTP, with modest results.

== IndyCar project ==
In the summer of 1982, Grand Touring Cars, Inc. president Harley E. Cluxton III began negotiations with Renault to build an engine for the CART Championship and the Indianapolis 500, derived from the six-cylinder two-liter turbo already used a few years earlier by the GTC-Mirage on the GR8 Renault and the M9. The car must be ready to participate in the 1983 season. The seat is for Mario Andretti, Rick Mears, Tom Sneva, or Geoff Brabham. The GTC-Mirage team believes that the rules of the American championship put the new engine on a par with the eight-cylinder Cosworth DFX, which at the time was installed on almost all the cars which participated in it. Redesigning the engine to reach the displacement limit of 2.65 liters should lead the French V6 to deliver around 800 hp with weight and dimensions lower than those of the competitor, as well as reliability which should be better. The project is approved by Renault, which provides engines, financial support, and technical support to the American team from 1983 to 1985, before cutting funds at the end of 1985, when the diamond firm withdrew from the American market with the sale of its Renault USA subsidiary and the AMC brand to Chrysler. Meanwhile, the new engine is installed in a Lola T900 (HU19 chassis number 24) from the Doug Shierson Racing team, which had been tested by Al Unser Jr. at Rattlesnake Raceway in Midland, West Texas. the private test track of Chaparral Cars, to end up in the hands of a private collector.

== Bibliography ==
- John Horsman (2006). Racing in the Rain, My Years with Brilliant Drivers, Legendary Sports Cars, and a Dedicated Team. David Bull Publishing. ISBN 1-893618-71-4.
- Time and Two Seats (© 1999 by Motorsport Research Group)
