= 1970 1000 km Buenos Aires =

Autodromo Municipal Ciudad de Buenos Aires No 14 (1968–1971)

The 1970 1000 km Buenos Aires was an endurance sports car event held in Buenos Aires, Argentina with international competitors.

== Official results ==
Class winners in bold. Cars failing to complete 70% of the winner's distance marked as Not Classified (NC).

| Pos | Class | No | Team | Drivers | Chassis | Laps |
| Pos | Class | No | Team | Drivers | Engine | Laps |
|---|---|---|---|---|---|---|
| 1 | **P** | **10** | **(France) Equipe Matra** | **(France) Jean-Pierre Beltoise (France) Henri Pescarolo** | **Matra-Simca MS630/650** | **164** |
| 1 | **P** | **10** | **(France) Equipe Matra** | **(France) Jean-Pierre Beltoise (France) Henri Pescarolo** | **Matra 3.0L V12** | **164** |
| 2 | P | 12 | (Spain) Escuderia Nacional | (Spain) Alex Soler-Roig (Austria) Jochen Rindt | Porsche 908/02 | 163 |
| 2 | P | 12 | (Spain) Escuderia Nacional | (Spain) Alex Soler-Roig (Austria) Jochen Rindt | Porsche 3.0L Flat-8 | 163 |
| 3 | P | 38 | (United Kingdom) A. G. Dean | (United Kingdom) Tony Dean (Argentina) Eduardo Copello | Porsche 908/02 | 160 |
| 3 | P | 38 | (United Kingdom) A. G. Dean | (United Kingdom) Tony Dean (Argentina) Eduardo Copello | Porsche 3.0L Flat-8 | 160 |
| 4 | **S** | **50** | **(Belgium) Racing Team VDS** | **(Belgium) Teddy Pilette (Argentina) Nestor García-Veiga** | **Lola T70 MkIIIB** | **157** |
| 4 | **S** | **50** | **(Belgium) Racing Team VDS** | **(Belgium) Teddy Pilette (Argentina) Nestor García-Veiga** | **Chevrolet 4.9L V8** | **157** |
| 5 | P | 40 | (United Kingdom) Ecurie Evergreen | (United Kingdom) Alain de Cadenet (Argentina) Carlos Pairetti | Porsche 908/02 | 154 |
| 5 | P | 40 | (United Kingdom) Ecurie Evergreen | (United Kingdom) Alain de Cadenet (Argentina) Carlos Pairetti | Porsche 3.0L Flat-8 | 154 |
| 6 | P | 6 | (Italy) Autodelta SpA | (Italy) Andrea de Adamich (United Kingdom) Piers Courage | Alfa Romeo T33/3 | 153 |
| 6 | P | 6 | (Italy) Autodelta SpA | (Italy) Andrea de Adamich (United Kingdom) Piers Courage | Alfa Romeo 3.0L V8 | 153 |
| 7 | S | 20 | (Switzerland) Ecurie Bonnier | (Sweden) Ronnie Peterson (Argentina) Jorge Cupeiro | Lola T70 MkIIIB | 152 |
| 7 | S | 20 | (Switzerland) Ecurie Bonnier | (Sweden) Ronnie Peterson (Argentina) Jorge Cupeiro | Chevrolet 4.9L V8 | 152 |
| 8 | P | 14 | (Spain) Escuderia Montjuich | (Spain) José Juncadella (Spain) Juan Fernández | Porsche 908/02 | 152 |
| 8 | P | 14 | (Spain) Escuderia Montjuich | (Spain) José Juncadella (Spain) Juan Fernández | Porsche 3.0L Flat-8 | 152 |
| 9 | P | 34 | (Sweden) Swedish Racing Team | (Finland) Hans Laine (Netherlands) Gijs van Lennep | Porsche 908/02 | 152 |
| 9 | P | 34 | (Sweden) Swedish Racing Team | (Finland) Hans Laine (Netherlands) Gijs van Lennep | Porsche 3.0L Flat-8 | 152 |
| 10 | P | 32 | (Germany) International Martini Racing Team | (Germany) Hans-Dieter Dechent (Germany) Gerhard Koch | Porsche 908/02 | 151 |
| 10 | P | 32 | (Germany) International Martini Racing Team | (Germany) Hans-Dieter Dechent (Germany) Gerhard Koch | Porsche 3.0L Flat-8 | 151 |
| 11 | S | 22 | (Sweden) Ulf Norinder | (United Kingdom) Jackie Oliver (Argentina) Carlos Reutemann | Lola T70 MkIIIB | 151 |
| 11 | S | 22 | (Sweden) Ulf Norinder | (United Kingdom) Jackie Oliver (Argentina) Carlos Reutemann | Chevrolet 4.9L V8 | 151 |
| 12 | S | 44 | (Switzerland) Rey Racing | (Switzerland) Jacques Rey (Switzerland) Edgar Berney | Lola T70 MkIIIB | 136 |
| 12 | S | 44 | (Switzerland) Rey Racing | (Switzerland) Jacques Rey (Switzerland) Edgar Berney | Chevrolet 4.9L V8 | 136 |
| DNF | S | 18 | (Switzerland) Ecurie Bonnier | (Sweden) Jo Bonnier (Sweden) Reine Wisell | Lola T70 MkIIIB | 129 |
| DNF | S | 18 | (Switzerland) Ecurie Bonnier | (Sweden) Jo Bonnier (Sweden) Reine Wisell | Chevrolet 4.9L V8 | 129 |
| DNF | P | 4 | (Italy) Autodelta SpA | (Italy) Nanni Galli (Germany) Rolf Stommelen | Alfa Romeo T33/3 | 108 |
| DNF | P | 4 | (Italy) Autodelta SpA | (Italy) Nanni Galli (Germany) Rolf Stommelen | Alfa Romeo 3.0L V8 | 108 |
| DNF | P | 36 | (Germany) German BG Racing Team | (Germany) Willi Kauhsen (Germany) Herbert Schultze | Porsche 908/02 | 99 |
| DNF | P | 36 | (Germany) German BG Racing Team | (Germany) Willi Kauhsen (Germany) Herbert Schultze | Porsche 3.0L Flat-8 | 99 |
| DNF | S | 42 | (United Kingdom) Avalon Racing | (United Kingdom) Barrie Smith (Netherlands) Ed Swart | Lola T70 MkIIIB | 75 |
| DNF | S | 42 | (United Kingdom) Avalon Racing | (United Kingdom) Barrie Smith (Netherlands) Ed Swart | Chevrolet 4.9L V8 | 75 |
| DNF | S | 28 | (United Kingdom) David Piper Auto Racing | (United Kingdom) David Piper (United Kingdom) Brian Redman | Porsche 917K | 58 |
| DNF | S | 28 | (United Kingdom) David Piper Auto Racing | (United Kingdom) David Piper (United Kingdom) Brian Redman | Porsche 4.5L Flat-12 | 58 |
| DNF | S | 26 | (United Kingdom) David Piper Autoracing | (United Kingdom) Chris Craft (United Kingdom) Richard Attwood | Lola T70 MkIIIB | 48 |
| DNF | S | 26 | (United Kingdom) David Piper Autoracing | (United Kingdom) Chris Craft (United Kingdom) Richard Attwood | Chevrolet 4.9L V8 | 48 |
| DNF | S | 46 | (United Kingdom) Sid Taylor | (United Kingdom) Trevor Taylor (United Kingdom) Peter Gethin | Lola T70 MkIIIB | 33 |
| DNF | S | 46 | (United Kingdom) Sid Taylor | (United Kingdom) Trevor Taylor (United Kingdom) Peter Gethin | Chevrolet 4.9L V8 | 33 |
| DNF | P | 2 | (Argentina) Berta | (Argentina) Luis di Palma (Argentina) Carlos Marincovich | Berta LR | 28 |
| DNF | P | 2 | (Argentina) Berta | (Argentina) Luis di Palma (Argentina) Carlos Marincovich | Ford Cosworth DFV 3.0L V8 | 28 |
| DNF | S | 24 | (Switzerland) Louis Morand | (Switzerland) Louis Morand (Switzerland) Gérard Pillon | Lola T70 MkIIIB | 28 |
| DNF | S | 24 | (Switzerland) Louis Morand | (Switzerland) Louis Morand (Switzerland) Gérard Pillon | Chevrolet 4.9L V8 | 28 |
| DNF | S | 16 | (Spain) Escuderia Montjuich | (Argentina) Pablo Bréa (Spain) Félix Serra | Ford GT40 | 23 |
| DNF | S | 16 | (Spain) Escuderia Montjuich | (Argentina) Pablo Bréa (Spain) Félix Serra | Ford 4.9L V8 | 23 |
| DNF | S | 48 | (United Kingdom) E.S.C.A. Zitro | (Switzerland) Dominique Martin (United Kingdom) Piers Forester | Ford GT40 | 23 |
| DNF | S | 48 | (United Kingdom) E.S.C.A. Zitro | (Switzerland) Dominique Martin (United Kingdom) Piers Forester | Ford 4.9L V8 | 23 |
| DNF | S | 52 | (United Kingdom) David Prophet | (United Kingdom) David Prophet (Argentina) Carlos Pascualini | Lola T70 MkIII | 9 |
| DNF | S | 52 | (United Kingdom) David Prophet | (United Kingdom) David Prophet (Argentina) Carlos Pascualini | Chevrolet 4.9L V8 | 9 |
| DNS | P | 8 | (Italy) Scuderia Serenissima | (United Kingdom) Jonathan Williams (Italy) Maurizio Montagnari | Serenissima Mk.168 | - |
| DNS | P | 8 | (Italy) Scuderia Serenissima | (United Kingdom) Jonathan Williams (Italy) Maurizio Montagnari | Serenissima 3.0L V8 | - |
| DNS | P | 30 | (Sweden) Sport Cars Broström | (Sweden) Richard Broström (United States) Masten Gregory | Porsche 908/02 | - |
| DNS | P | 30 | (Sweden) Sport Cars Broström | (Sweden) Richard Broström (United States) Masten Gregory | Porsche 3.0L Flat-8 | - |
