= 1967 Buenos Aires Grand Prix =

The Buenos Aires Circuit No.2

The 1966 Buenos Aires Grand Prix was a Formula Three race held on January 22, 1967 at the Autódromo Municipal in Buenos Aires, Argentina. The race was the first race for the XVI Temporada Argentina.

== Classification ==
| Pos | Driver | Constructor | Laps | Time/Retired |
|---|---|---|---|---|
| 1 | (France) Jean-Pierre Beltoise | Matra MS5 - Ford/Cosworth | 35 | 58'28.6" |
| 2 | (France) Eric Offenstadt | Lotus 35 - Ford | 35 | 58'49.2" |
| 3 | (France) Jean-Pierre Jaussaud | Matra MS5 - Ford | 35 | 58'53.6" |
| 4 | (France) Johnny Servoz-Gavin | Matra MS5 - Ford | 35 | 58'56.8" |
| 5 | (United Kingdom) John Cardwell | Lotus 41 - Ford | 35 | 58'58.5" |
| 6 | (United Kingdom) Alan Rollinson | Brabham BT18 - Ford | 35 | 59'00.0" |
| 7 | (Switzerland) Jürg Dubler | Brabham BT18 - Ford | 35 | 59'27.6" |
| 8 | (Germany) Manfred Mohr | Brabham BT15 - Ford | 35 | 59'47.4" |
| 9 | (Argentina) Juan Manuel Bordeu | Brabham BT15 - Ford | 35 | 59'50.7" |
| 10 | (Argentina) Nasif Estéfano | Lotus 41 - Ford | 35 | 1:00'01.3" |
| 11 | (Italy) Carlo Facetti | Tecno TF/66 - Ford | 34 | |
| 12 | (Italy) Giovanni Alberti | de Sanctis - Ford | 34 | |
| 13 | (Argentina) Jorge Cupeiro | Brabham - Ford | 34 | |
| 14 | (Italy) Giacomo Russo | Lotus 41 - Ford | 34 | |
| 15 | (Argentina) Carlos Marincovich | Brabham BT18 - Ford | 34 | |
| 16 | (Switzerland) Clay Regazzoni | Brabham BT15 - Ford | 34 | |
| 17 | (Italy) Antonio Maglione | de Sanctis - Ford | 34 | |
| 18 | (Argentina) Carlos Pairetti | Brabham BT18 - Ford | 34 | |
| 19 | (Italy) Romano Perdomi | de Sanctis - Ford | 33 | |
| 20 | (Italy) Rosadele Facetti | Tecno TF/66 - Ford | 33 | |
| 21 | (United Kingdom) Natalie Goodwin | Brabham BT18 - Ford | 32 | |
| Ret | (Argentina) Jorge Kissling | BWA - Ford | 24 | DNF |
| Ret | (Argentina) Eduardo Copello | Brabham - Ford | 13 | DNF |
| Ret | (Italy) Giancarlo Baghetti | Lotus 41 - Ford | 6 | DNF |
| Ret | (United Kingdom) Charles Crichton-Stuart | Brabham BT21 - Ford | 3 | DNF |
| Ret | (United Kingdom) Chris Lambert | Cooper T83 - Ford | 3 | DNF |
| Ret | (Argentina) Andrea Vianini | Brabham BT21 - Ford | 3 | DNF |
| Ret | (Argentina) Carlos Martin | de Sanctis - Ford | | DNQ |
| Ret | (Switzerland) Silvio Moser | Brabham BT18 - Ford | | DNQ |
| Ret | (Argentina) Alberto Rodríguez Larreta | | | DNA |
| Ret | (Italy) Alfredo Simoni | Tecno TF/66 - Ford | | DNA |
| Ret | (Argentina) Eduardo Casa | Brabham - Ford | | DNA |
