= 1968 Buenos Aires Grand Prix =

The Buenos Aires Circuit No.9

Results from the 1968 Buenos Aires Grand Prix held at Buenos Aires on December 1, 1968, in the Autódromo Oscar Alfredo Gálvez. The race was the first race for the XVII Temporada Argentina.

It was won by Ernesto Brambilla.

== Classification ==
Pos	Driver	Constructor	Laps	Time/Retired
1	(Italy) Ernesto Brambilla	Ferrari Dino 166 V6	70	1:35:20.6
2	(Italy) Andrea de Adamich	Ferrari Dino 166 V6	70	1:35:20.8
3	(United Kingdom) Jackie Oliver	Lotus 48 - Cosworth FVA	70	1:36:30.0
4	(Switzerland) Clay Regazzoni	Tecno 68 - Cosworth FVA	70	1:36:39.1
5	(France) Henri Pescarolo	Matra MS7 - Cosworth FVA	69	
6	(Mexico) Pedro Rodriguez	Tecno 68 - Cosworth FVA	69	
7	(Argentina) Juan Manuel Bordeu	Brabham BT23C - Cosworth FVA	68	
8	(Italy) Carlo Facetti	Tecno 68 - Cosworth FVA	68	
9	(Argentina) Andrea Vianini	Tecno 68 - Cosworth FVA	68	
10	(United Kingdom) Alan Rees	Brabham BT23C - Cosworth FVA	66	
Ret	(United Kingdom) Jonathan Williams	Tecno 68 - Cosworth FVA		DNF
Ret	(Argentina) Jorge Cupeiro	Brabham BT23C - Cosworth FVA		DNF
Ret	(Switzerland) Jo Siffert	Tecno 68 - Cosworth FVA	23	DNF
Ret	(United Kingdom) Piers Courage	Brabham BT23C - Cosworth FVA	23	DNF
Ret	(Austria) Jochen Rindt	Brabham BT23C - Cosworth FVA	23	DNF
Ret	(Switzerland) Silvio Moser	Tecno 68 - Cosworth FVA	15	DNF
Ret	(France) Jean-Pierre Beltoise	Matra MS7 - Cosworth FVA		DNF
Ret	(Argentina) Carlos Reutemann	Tecno 68 - Cosworth FVA		DNF
Ret	(Argentina) Eduardo Copello	Brabham BT23C - Cosworth FVA		DNF
Ret	(Argentina) Carlos Pairetti	Brabham BT23C - Cosworth FVA		DNF
Ret	(Argentina) Carlos Marincovich	Tecno 68 - Cosworth FVA		DNF
Ret	(United Kingdom) Morris Nunn	Lotus 48 - Cosworth FVA		DNF
