= 1978 Buenos Aires Grand Prix =

The Buenos Aires Circuit No:9

The 1978 Buenos Aires Grand Prix was a Formula Two race held on November 11, 1978, at the Autódromo Municipal in Buenos Aires, Argentina.

== Classification ==
| Pos | Driver | Constructor | Laps | Time/Retired |
|---|---|---|---|---|
| 1 | (Brazil) Ingo Hoffmann | March 782 - BMW | 50 | 1:01'14.70" |
| 2 | (Argentina) Ricardo Zunino | March 782 - BMW | 50 | 1:01'21.70" |
| 3 | (Switzerland) Clay Regazzoni | Chevron B40 - BMW | 50 | 1:01'25.73" |
| 4 | (Italy) Piercarlo Ghinzani | March 782 - BMW | 50 | 1:01'38.15" |
| 5 | (United States) Eddie Cheever | March 782 - BMW | 50 | 1:01'41.19" |
| 6 | (Brazil) Alex Ribeiro | March 782 - Hart | 50 | 1:02'07.14" |
| 7 | (Republic of Ireland) Derek Daly | Chevron B42 - Hart | 50 | 1:02'09.23" |
| 8 | (Argentina) Miguel Angel Guerra | Chevron B42 - Ferrari Dino | 50 | 1:02'19.19" |
| 9 | (United States) Don Breidenbach | Chevron B42 - Hart | 50 | 1:02'20.79" |
| 10 | (Finland) Keijo Rosberg | Chevron B42 - Hart | 49 | |
| 11 | (Italy) Alberto Colombo | March 782 - BMW | 49 | |
| 12 | (Australia) John Briggs | Chevron B42 - Hart | 49 | |
| 13 | (United Kingdom) Geoff Lees | Chevron B42 - Hart | 48 | |
| Ret | (Argentina) Ariel Bakst | March 782 - BMW | 40 | DNF |
| Ret | (United Kingdom) Brian Henton | March 782 - Hart | 28 | DNF |
| Ret | (South Africa) Rad Dougall | March 782 - BMW | 27 | DNF |
| Ret | (Italy) Beppe Gabbiani | Chevron B42 - Ferrari Dino | 24 | DNF |
| Ret | (United Kingdom) Stephen South | Chevron B42 - Hart | 5 | DNF |
| Ret | (France) Jean-Pierre Jarier | March 782 - BMW | 2 | DNF |
| Ret | (Italy) Bruno Giacomelli | March 782 - BMW | | DNS |
| Ret | (Switzerland) Marc Surer | March 782 - BMW | | DNS |
| Ret | (Italy) Teo Fabi | March 782 - BMW | | DNA |
