= 1947 Buenos Aires Grand Prix (I) =

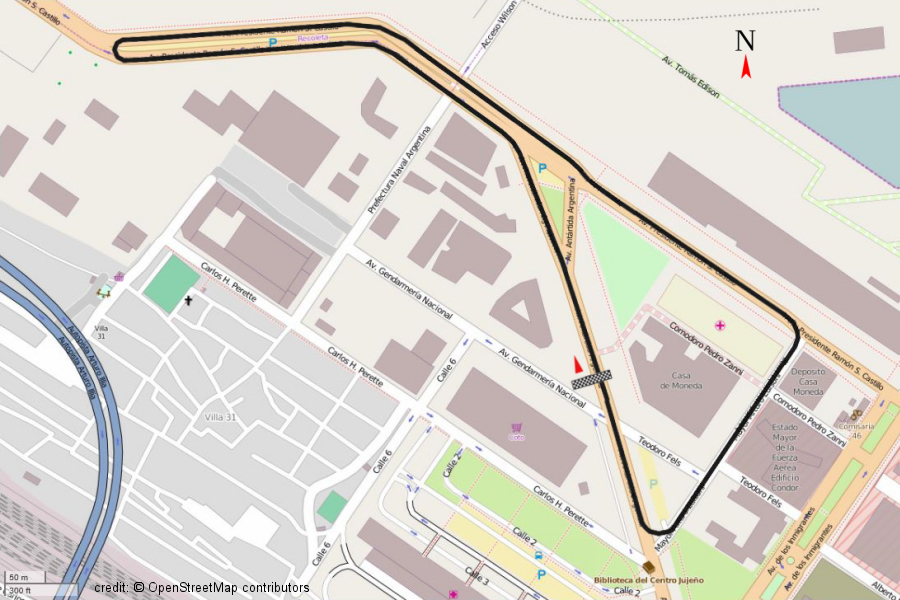

Race details
- Date: February 8–9 1947
- Official name: I Gran Premio del General Juan Perón
- Location: Retiro, Buenos Aires, Argentina
- Course: Public streets
- Course length: 2.410 km (1.497 miles)
- Distance: 50 laps, 120.5 km (74.87 miles)

Fastest lap
Driver	(Italy) Luigi Villoresi	Maserati 4CL
- Time: 1m 06s 131.45 km/h (81.68 mp/h)

Podium
First	(Italy) Luigi Villoresi	Maserati 4CL
Second	(Italy) Achille Varzi	Alfa Romeo 308
Third	(Brazil) Chico Landi	Alfa Romeo 308

The first of two 1947 Buenos Aires Grand Prix (official name: I Gran Premio del General Juan Perón, also known as the I Gran Premio Ciudad de Buenos Aires) was a Grand Prix motor race held on February 8–9, 1947 at the Retiro street circuit in Buenos Aires. The scheduled competitions opened on February 8 with two preliminary rounds of the Mecánica Argentina – Fuerza Limitada and Mecánica Argentina – Fuerza Libre classes for a combined final which determined the qualification for the February 9, Formula Libre main event.

== Classification ==
Pos	Driver	Constructor	Laps	Time/Retired
1	(Italy) Luigi Villoresi	Maserati 4CL	50	1:04:11
2	(Italy) Achille Varzi	Alfa Romeo 308	50	1:04:12
3	(Brazil) Chico Landi	Alfa Romeo 308	49	1:04:38
4	(Italy) Giacomo Palmieri	Maserati 6CM	48	1:04:43
5	(Argentina) Pablo Pessatti	Alfa Romeo 8C-35	48	1:04:53
6	(Argentina) Italo Bizio	Alfa Romeo 2900 A		
Ret	(France) Raph	Maserati 6CM	16	DNF
Ret	(Argentina) Óscar Alfredo Gálvez	Alfa Romeo 308	10	DNF
Ret	(Italy) Carlo Pintacuda	Maserati 4CL		DNF
Ret	(Argentina) Juan Gálvez	Alfa Romeo P3		DNF
Ret	(Argentina) Francisco Culligan	Maserati 6CM		DNF
Ret	(Argentina) Clemar Bucci	Cadillac 16c		DNF
Ret	(Argentina) Pascual Puopolo	Maserati 8CL		DNS

Grand Prix Race
1947 Grand Prix season
Previous race: 1941 Buenos Aires Grand Prix	Buenos Aires Grand Prix	Next race: 1947 Buenos Aires Grand Prix (II)
