= 1947 Buenos Aires Grand Prix (II) =

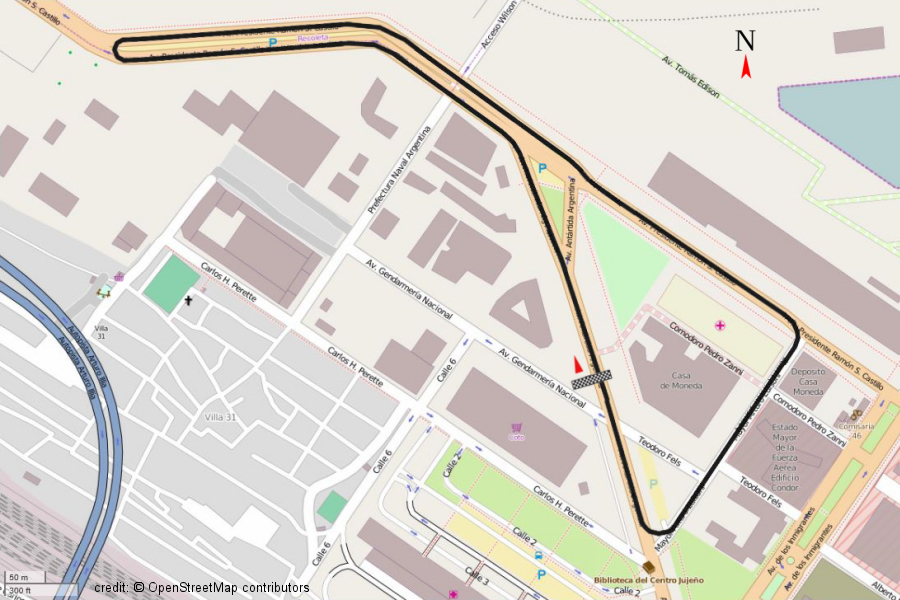

Race details
- Date: February 15–16 1947
- Official name: I Gran Premio de Eva Duarte Perón
- Location: Retiro, Buenos Aires, Argentina
- Course: Public streets
- Course length: 2.410 km (1.497 miles)
- Distance: 50 laps, 120.5 km (74.87 miles)

Podium
First	(Italy) Luigi Villoresi	Maserati 4CL
Second	(Argentina) Pablo Pessatti	Alfa Romeo 8C-35
Third	(Italy) Giacomo Palmieri	Maserati 6CM

The second of two 1947 Buenos Aires Grand Prix (official name: I Gran Premio de Eva Duarte Perón, also known as the II Gran Premio Ciudad de Buenos Aires) was a Grand Prix motor race held on February 15–16, 1947 at the Retiro street circuit in Buenos Aires, Argentina. Competitions opened on February 15 with two preliminary rounds of the Mecánica Argentina – Fuerza Limitada and Mecánica Argentina – Fuerza Libre classes for a combined final which determined the qualification for the February 16, Formula Libre main event.

== Classification ==
Pos	Driver	Constructor	Laps	Time/Retired
1	(Italy) Luigi Villoresi	Maserati 4CL	50	1:05:09.5
2	(Argentina) Pablo Pessatti	Alfa Romeo 8C-35	50	1:05:27.5
3	(Italy) Giacomo Palmieri	Maserati 6CM	50	1:06:11.5
4	(Argentina) Italo Bizio	Alfa Romeo 2900	48	1:06:18.4
5	(Brazil) Chico Landi	Alfa Romeo 308	47	1:06:23.5
6	(France) Raph	Maserati 6CM		
7	(Argentina) Juan Gálvez	Alfa Romeo P3		DNF
Ret	(Italy) Achille Varzi	Alfa Romeo 308	29	DNF
Ret	(Argentina) Óscar Alfredo Gálvez	Alfa Romeo 308		DNF
Ret	(Italy) Carlo Pintacuda	Maserati 4CL		DNF
Ret	(Argentina) Pascual Puoppolo	Maserati 8CL		DNF
Ret	(Argentina) Francisco Culligham	Maserati 6CM		DNF
Ret	(Argentina) Clemar Bucci	Cadillac 16c		DNF
Ret	(Italy) Enrico Platé	Maserati 4CL		DNS

Grand Prix Race
1947 Grand Prix season
Previous race: 1947 Buenos Aires Grand Prix (I)	Buenos Aires Grand Prix	Next race: 1948 Buenos Aires Grand Prix (I)
