= 1936 Buenos Aires Grand Prix =

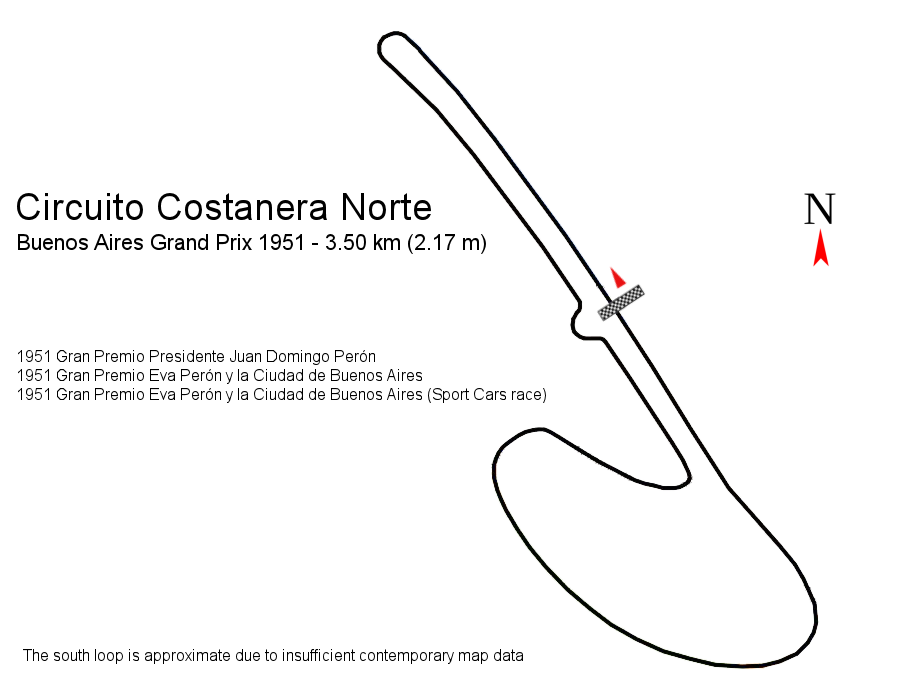

Race details
- Date: October 18, 1936
- Official name: Premio Ciudad de Buenos Aires
- Location: Coctanera Norte Buenos Aires
- Course: Public streets
- Course length: 2.65 km (1.64 miles)
- Distance: 30 laps, 79.5 km (49.39 miles)

Pole position
Driver	N/A	

Fastest lap
Driver	(Argentina) Carlos Zatuszek	Mercedes
- Time: 1m 20.1s

Podium
First	(Argentina) Carlos Arzani	Alfa Romeo
Second	(Argentina) Carlos Zatuszek	Mercedes
Third	(Argentina) Luis Brosutti	Mercedes

October 18, 1936 - The first Buenos Aires Grand Prix (official name: I Gran Premio Ciudad de Buenos Aires), was a Fuerza Libre race, run at the Costanera Norte circuit in three elimination heats and 1 final of 30 laps (2,65 km = 79,5 km), qualifying the top 11 drivers for the final. The entry list consisted of South American drivers. Heat 1 was won by Enrique Moyano (Ford), Heat 2 by Brazilian Manoel de Teffé (Alfa Romeo) and Zatuszek (Mercedes Benz) won the third.

Argentinian drivers dominated the final with Arzani placing first, Zatuszek second and Brosutti taking third on the podium to give Argentina a triple victory. De Teffé in fourth place was the only non Argentinian in the top six, followed by Moyano and Angel Garabato (Chrysler). Grid or race numbers are not currently available.

== Classification ==
Pos	No	Driver	Constructor	Laps	Time/Retired
1		(Argentina) Carlos Arzani	Alfa Romeo 8C-35	30	42:38.4
2		(Argentina) Carlos Zatuszek	Mercedes-Benz SSK	30	43:05.4
3		(Argentina) Luis Brosutti	Mercedes-Benz	30	43:43
4		(Brazil) Manuel de Teffé	Alfa Romeo	30	44:01
5		(Argentina) Enrique Felix Moyano	Ford	29	+ 1 Lap
6		(Argentina) Angel Garabato	Chrysler	28	+ 2 Laps
7		(Argentina) Tadeo Taddia	Chevrolet	27	+ 3 Laps
8		(Argentina) Domingo Ochoteco	Ford V8	36	+ 4 Laps
DNF		(Argentina) Augusto McCarthy	Chrysler 6		
DNF		(Argentina) A. Rossi	Ford V8		
DNF		(Brazil) Domingos Lopes	Hudson		

== Notes ==
Manuel de Teffé (Baron Manuel de Teffé von Hoonholtz - *March 30, 1905 ↑January 1, 1967) was among the most prominent south-American drivers of the era before Chico Landi. De Teffé is credited with being instrumental for bringing European drivers to race in Brazil during the late 30s and was the main creator of the Gávea circuit and its races.

Grand Prix Race
1936 Grand Prix season
Previous race: (N/A)	Buenos Aires Grand Prix	Next race: 1941 Buenos Aires Grand Prix
