= 1952 Buenos Aires Grand Prix (I) =

Race details
- Date: March 9, 1952
- Official name: VI Gran Premio del General Juan Perón y de la Ciudad de Buenos Aires
- Location: Buenos Aires Argentina
- Course: Purpose built
- Course length: 4.708 km (2.924 miles)
- Distance: 30 laps, 141.22 km (87.75 miles)

Pole position
| Driver | (Argentina) Juan Manuel Fangio | Ferrari 166 FL |
- Time: 2m 25.0 (116.89 km/h)

Fastest lap
| Driver | (Argentina) Juan Manuel Fangio | Ferrari 166 FL |
- Time: 2m 29.5 (113.29 km/h)

Podium
| First | (Argentina) Juan Manuel Fangio | Ferrari |
| Second | (Argentina) José Froilán González | Ferrari |
| Third | (Brazil) Chico Landi | Ferrari |

Results from the 1952 Buenos Aires Grand Prix held in Buenos Aires on 9 March 1952, at the inauguration of the Autódromo Oscar Gálvez.

== Classification ==
| Pos | Driver | Constructor | Laps | Time/Retired |
|---|---|---|---|---|
| 1 | (Argentina) Juan Manuel Fangio | Ferrari 166 FL | 30 | 1:17:19.2 |
| 2 | (Argentina) José Froilán González | Ferrari 166 C | 30 | 1:17:19.4 |
| 3 | (Brazil) Chico Landi | Ferrari 125 C | 30 | 1:19:16.5 |
| 4 | (Argentina) Jorge Daponte | Maserati 4CLT | 29 | 1:18:03.0 |
| 5 | (Uruguay) Eitel Cantoni | Maserati 4CLT | 29 | 1:18:47.4 |
| 6 | (Argentina) Carlos Menditeguy | Maserati 4CLT | 28 | 1:17:40.2 |
| 7 | (Uruguay) Asdrúbal Fontes Bayardo | Maserati 4CLT | 28 | 1:17:53.2 |
| 8 | (Argentina) Hector Niemitz | Alfa Romeo 8C-2900A | 27 | 1:19:25.4 |
| 9 | (Brazil) Ruben Abrunhosa | Ferrari 125 sc | 27 | 1:19:25.4 |
| Ret | (Argentina) Alfredo Pián | Maserati 4CLT | 19 | DNF |
| Ret | (Argentina) Clemar Bucci | Alfa Romeo 12C-37 | 10 | DNF |
| Ret | (Brazil) Pinheiro Pires | Talbot T26C | 6 | DNF |
| Ret | (Italy) Nello Pagani | Maserati A6 | 5 | DNF |
| Ret | (France) André Simon | Simca-Gordini T15 | 3 | DNF |
| Ret | (France) Robert Manzon | Simca-Gordini T15 | 1 | DNF |
| Ret | (Argentina) Alberto Crespo | Talbot T26C | | DNF |
| Ret | (Brazil) A.Rodriguez | Maserati 4CLT 1.5 | | DNF |
| Ret | (Argentina) Adolfo Schwelm Cruz | Alfa Romeo 8C | | DNF |
| Ret | (Brazil) Francisco Marques | Maserati 4CLT | | DNF |
