= 1966 Buenos Aires Grand Prix =

The Buenos Aires Circuit No.2

The 1966 Buenos Aires Grand Prix was a Formula Three race held on January 23, 1966 at the Autódromo Municipal in Buenos Aires, Argentina. The race was the first race for the XV Temporada Argentina.

Three spectators were hospitalized during the qualifying trials after being hit by a car.

== Classification ==
Pos	Driver	Constructor	Laps	Time/Retired
1	(United Kingdom) Chris Irwin	Brabham BT16 - Ford/Cosworth	35	59'57.6"
2	(United Kingdom) Charles Crichton-Stuart	Brabham BT10 - Ford/Cosworth	35	1:00'29.1"
3	(Argentina) Nasif Estéfano	Brabham - Ford	35	1:00'35.4"
4	(United Kingdom) Jonathan Williams	Brabham BT10 - Ford	35	1:00'45.5"
5	(France) Eric Offenstadt	Lola T60 - Ford/Cosworth	35	1:01'32.2"
6	(Argentina) Jorge Cupeiro	Brabham BT15 - Ford	35	1:01'35.7"
7	(Germany) Karl Freiherr von Wendt	Lotus 35 - Ford	34	
8	(Australia) Martin Davies	Brabham BT10 - Ford/Cosworth	34	
9	(Germany) Jochen Neerpasch	Lotus 35 - Ford	34	
10	(Sweden) Picko Troberg	Brabham BT15 - Ford/Cosworth	34	
11	(Argentina) Andrea Vianini	Brabham BT15 - Ford	34	
12	(Switzerland) Clay Regazzoni	Brabham BT15 - Ford/Cosworth	34	
13	(Argentina) Vincente Sergio	Brabham - Ford	33	
14	(Belgium) Mauro Bianchi	Alpine A310 - Renault/Mignotet	33	
Ret	(Brazil) Wilson Fittipaldi	Wyllis Monoposto - Renault	21	DNF
Ret	(Argentina) Juan Manuel Bordeu	Brabham - Ford	20	DNF
Ret	(Switzerland) Silvio Moser	Brabham BT16 - Ford/Cosworth	17	DNF
Ret	(Italy) Carlo Facetti	Brabham BT10 - Ford	13	DNF
Ret	(Argentina) Oscar Fangio	Brabham BT10 - Ford	8	DNF
Ret	(Argentina) Carlos Pairetti	Alpine A310 - Renault/Mignotet	5	DNF
Ret	(France) Henri Grandsire	Alpine A310 - Renault/Mignotet	1	DNF
Ret	(United Kingdom) John Cardwell	Brabham BT15 - Ford/Cosworth		DNQ
Ret	(Switzerland) Walter Flückiger	Lotus 35 - Ford		DNQ
Ret	(Italy) Alfredo Simoni	Brabham - Ford		DNQ
Ret	(Argentina) Nestor Salerno	Brabham BT15 - Ford		DNA
Ret	(United Kingdom) Piers Courage	Brabham BT10 - Ford		DNA

== Second race ==
Results from the 1966 Buenos Aires Grand Prix held at Buenos Aires on January 23, 1966, in the Autódromo Oscar Alfredo Gálvez.The race was the first race for the XV Temporada Argentina.

Pos	Driver	Constructor	Laps	Time/Retired
1	(United Kingdom) Chris Irwin	Brabham BT16 - Ford/Cosworth	35	59'57.6"
2	(United Kingdom) Charles Crichton-Stuart	Brabham BT10 - Ford/Cosworth	35	1:00'29.1"
3	(Argentina) Nasif Estéfano	Brabham - Ford	35	1:00'35.4"
4	(United Kingdom) Jonathan Williams	Brabham BT10 - Ford	35	1:00'45.5"
5	(France) Eric Offenstadt	Lola T60 - Ford/Cosworth	35	1:01'32.2"
6	(Argentina) Jorge Cupeiro	Brabham BT15 - Ford	35	1:01'35.7"
7	(Germany) Karl Freiherr von Wendt	Lotus 35 - Ford	34	
8	(Australia) Martin Davies	Brabham BT10 - Ford/Cosworth	34	
9	(Germany) Jochen Neerpasch	Lotus 35 - Ford	34	
10	(Sweden) Picko Troberg	Brabham BT15 - Ford/Cosworth	34	
11	(Argentina) Andrea Vianini	Brabham BT15 - Ford	34	
12	(Switzerland) Clay Regazzoni	Brabham BT15 - Ford/Cosworth	34	
13	(Argentina) Vincente Sergio	Brabham - Ford	33	
14	(Belgium) Mauro Bianchi	Alpine A310 - Renault/Mignotet	33	
Ret	(Brazil) Wilson Fittipaldi	Wyllis Monoposto - Renault	21	DNF
Ret	(Argentina) Juan Manuel Bordeu	Brabham - Ford	20	DNF
Ret	(Switzerland) Silvio Moser	Brabham BT16 - Ford/Cosworth	17	DNF
Ret	(Italy) Carlo Facetti	Brabham BT10 - Ford	13	DNF
Ret	(Argentina) Oscar Fangio	Brabham BT10 - Ford	8	DNF
Ret	(Argentina) Carlos Pairetti	Alpine A310 - Renault/Mignotet	5	DNF
Ret	(France) Henri Grandsire	Alpine A310 - Renault/Mignotet	1	DNF
Ret	(United Kingdom) John Cardwell	Brabham BT15 - Ford/Cosworth		DNQ
Ret	(Switzerland) Walter Flückiger	Lotus 35 - Ford		DNQ
Ret	(Italy) Alfredo Simoni	Brabham - Ford		DNQ
Ret	(Argentina) Nestor Salerno	Brabham BT15 - Ford		DNA
Ret	(United Kingdom) Piers Courage	Brabham BT10 - Ford		DNA
