= Buenos Aires Grand Prix =

Buenos Aires Grand Prix may refer to one of two former sporting events:

- Buenos Aires Grand Prix (motor racing), a former motor sport race
- Buenos Aires Grand Prix (tennis), a former Grand Prix tennis event which continues today as an ATP World Tour event
