= 1998 Buenos Aires Grand Prix =

The Buenos Aires Circuit No:8

Results from the 1998 Buenos Aires Grand Prix held at Buenos Aires on November 8, 1998, in the Autódromo Oscar Alfredo Gálvez.

== Classification ==
Pos	Driver	Constructor	Laps	Time/Retired
1	(Argentina) Martín Basso	Dallara F394-Mitsubishi	30	35:44.55
2	(Argentina) Gabriel Furlán	Dallara F394-Mitsubishi	30	35:45.37
3	(Brazil) Eduardo Pamplona	Dallara F394-Opel	30	35:45.87
4	(Brazil) Jaime Melo	Dallara F394-Mugen	30	35:46.81
5	(Brazil) Tom Stefani	Dallara F394-Mugen	30	35:59.17
6	(Brazil) Leonardo Nienkotter	Dallara F394-Opel	30	36:02.86
7	(Brazil) Rodrigo Sperafico	Dallara F394-Mugen	30	36:03.29
8	(Brazil) Ricardo Sperafico	Dallara F394-Mugen	30	36:08.57
9	(Brazil) Luiz Fernando Uva	Dallara F394-Mugen	30	36:26.15
10	(Argentina) Daniel Belli	Dallara F394-Opel	30	36:30.62
11	(Argentina) Gabriel Werner	Dallara F394-Fiat	30	36:54.65"
12	(Brazil) Rodrigo Yungh	Dallara F394-Toyota	29	
13	(Brazil) Urubatan Rama y Helou Jr	Dallara F394-Opel	29	
14	(Brazil) Alexandre Sperafico	Dallara F394-Mugen	29	
15	(Uruguay) Fernando Rama	Dallara F394-Fiat	29	
16	(Brazil) João Barreto	Dallara F390-Mugen	29	
17	(Argentina) Leandro Guimard	Dallara F394-Mugen	28	
18	(Uruguay) Raul Bruschi	Dallara F394-Mugen	28	
19	(Uruguay) Eddy Mion	Dallara F394-Mugen	28	
DNF	(Brazil) Rodrigo Bernardes	Dallara F394-Mugen	1	
