= 1952 Buenos Aires Grand Prix (II) =

Race details
- Date: March 16, 1952
- Official name: VI Gran Premio Maria Eva Duarte de Perón y de la Ciudad de Buenos Aires
- Location: Buenos Aires Argentina
- Course: Purpose built
- Course length: 4.708 km (2.924 miles)
- Distance: 30 laps, 141.22 km (87.75 miles)

Pole position
Driver	(Argentina) José Froilán González	Ferrari 166 C
- Time: 2m 27.5 (114.91 km/h)

Fastest lap
Driver	(Argentina) Juan Manuel Fangio	Ferrari 166 FL
- Time: 2m 28.8 (113.85 km/h)

Podium
First	(Argentina) Juan Manuel Fangio	Ferrari
Second	(Argentina) Carlos Menditeguy	Ferrari
Third	(Brazil) Chico Landi	Ferrari

The second 1952 Buenos Aires Grand Prix was held in Buenos Aires on March 16, 1952, as the second inauguration race of the Autódromo Oscar Gálvez.

== Classification ==
Pos	Driver	Constructor	Laps	Time/Retired
1	(Argentina) Juan Manuel Fangio	Ferrari 166 FL	30	1:17:19.2
2	(Argentina) Carlos Menditeguy	Ferrari 166 C	30	1:17:19.4
3	(Brazil) Chico Landi	Ferrari 125 C	30	1:19:16.5
4	(Argentina) Alberto Crespo	Maserati 4CLT	29	1:18:03.0
5	(Uruguay) Eitel Cantoni	Maserati 4CLT	29	1:18:19.0
Ret	(Uruguay) Asdrúbal Fontes Bayardo	Maserati 4CLT	24	1:16:12.0
Ret	(France) Robert Manzon	Simca-Gordini T15	27	DNF
Ret	(Argentina) José Froilán González	Ferrari 166 C	24	DNF
Ret	(Argentina) Adolfo Schwelm Cruz	Alfa Romeo 308A	15	DNF
Ret	(France) André Simon	Simca-Gordini T15		DNF
Ret	(Argentina) Clemar Bucci	Alfa Romeo 12C-37		DNF
Ret	(Brazil) Francisco Marques	Maserati 4CLT		DNF
Ret	(Argentina) Jorge Daponte	Maserati 4CLT		DNF
Ret	(Argentina) Benedicto Campos			DNF
Ret	(Argentina) Hector Niemitz	Alfa Romeo 8C-2900A		DNF
Ret	(Argentina) Alfredo Pián	Maserati 4CLT		DNF
Ret	(Italy) Nello Pagani	Talbot T26C		DNF
