= 2009 Formula 3 Sudamericana season =

2009 Formula 3 Sudamericana

Seasons
- ← 2008 2010 →

The 2009 Formula 3 Sudamericana season is the season in which the 2009 Sudamericana Championship was held. The 2009 season was the 23rd Formula 3 Sudamericana season. The season began on 6 June 2009, at Autódromo Internacional Nelson Piquet in Brasília and ended on 22 November 2009 at Autódromo Internacional de Curitiba. Brazilian driver Leonardo Cordeiro won the title.

== Drivers and teams ==
- All drivers competed in Pirelli-shod.

| Team | No | Driver | Chassis | Engine | Rounds |
Class A
| (Brazil) Cesário Fórmula | 1 | (Brazil) Leonardo Cordeiro | Dallara F309 | Berta | All |
| (Brazil) Cesário Fórmula | 2 | (Brazil) Lucas Foresti | Dallara F309 | Berta | All |
| (Brazil) PropCar Racing | 7 | (Brazil) Igor Veras | Dallara F309 | Berta | All |
| (Brazil) PropCar Racing | 8 | (Brazil) Nilton Molina | Dallara F309 | Berta | All |
| (Brazil) Dragão Motorsport | 11 | (Brazil) Luiz Boesel | Dallara F309 | Berta | All |
| (Brazil) Dragão Motorsport | 16 | (Brazil) Víctor Guerin | Dallara F309 | Berta | 1–5, 7–8 |
| (Brazil) Kemba Racing | 12 | (Brazil) Leonardo de Souza | Dallara F309 | Berta | 1–5, 7, 9 |
| (Brazil) Kemba Racing | 14 | (Brazil) André Negrão | Dallara F309 | Berta | 6–7 |
| (United Kingdom) Hitech Racing | 13 | (Austria) Walter Grubmüller | Dallara F309 | Mercedes | 7 |
| (Brazil) Bassan Motorsport | 14 | (Brazil) Fernando Galera | Dallara F309 | Berta | 1–4 |
| (Brazil) Bassan Motorsport | 15 | (Brazil) Claudio Cantelli Jr. | Dallara F309 | Berta | All |
| (Brazil) Razia Motorsport | 17 | (Brazil) Yann Cunha | Dallara F309 | Berta | All |
| (Brazil) Razia Motorsport | 18 | (Brazil) Henrique Lambert | Dallara F309 | Berta | 3–9 |
Class B
| (Brazil) Cesário Fórmula Junior | 31 | (Brazil) Henrique Martins | Dallara F301 | Berta | All |
| (Brazil) Cesário Fórmula Junior | 32 | (Brazil) Raphael Abbate | Dallara F301 | Berta | All |
| (Brazil) Baumer Racing | 33 | (Brazil) Lucilio Baumer | Dallara F301 | Berta | 1 |
| (Brazil) Kemba Racing | 41 | (Brazil) Mateus Laba | Dallara F301 | Berta | 4 |
| (Brazil) Bassani Racing | 43 | (Brazil) Leandro Florenzo | Dallara F301 | Berta | 4, 7 |
| (Brazil) MX Sports | 63 | (Brazil) Bruno Andrade | Dallara F301 | Berta | All |

== Race calendar and results ==
| Round | | Location | Circuit | Date | Pole position | Fastest lap | Winning driver | Supporting |
|---|---|---|---|---|---|---|---|---|
| 1 | R1 | Brasília, Brazil | Brasília | 6 June | (Brazil) Leonardo Cordeiro | (Brazil) Fernando Galera | (Brazil) Fernando Galera | Stand-alone event |
| 1 | R2 | Brasília, Brazil | Brasília | 7 June | (Brazil) Leonardo Cordeiro | (Brazil) Leonardo Cordeiro | (Brazil) Leonardo Cordeiro | Stand-alone event |
| 2 | R1 | Pinhais, Brazil | Autódromo Internacional de Curitiba | 13 June | (Brazil) Leonardo Cordeiro | (Brazil) Leonardo Cordeiro | (Brazil) Leonardo Cordeiro | Stand-alone event |
| 2 | R2 | Pinhais, Brazil | Autódromo Internacional de Curitiba | 14 June | (Brazil) Leonardo Cordeiro | (Brazil) Leonardo Cordeiro | (Brazil) Leonardo de Souza | Stand-alone event |
| 3 | R1 | Rio de Janeiro, Brazil | Jacarepaguá | 11 July | (Brazil) Leonardo Cordeiro | (Brazil) Leonardo Cordeiro | (Brazil) Leonardo Cordeiro | Stand-alone event |
| 3 | R2 | Rio de Janeiro, Brazil | Jacarepaguá | 12 July | (Brazil) Leonardo Cordeiro | (Brazil) Leonardo Cordeiro | (Brazil) Leonardo Cordeiro | Stand-alone event |
| 4 | R1 | Santa Cruz do Sul, Brazil | Autódromo Internacional de Santa Cruz do Sul | 29 August | (Brazil) Luiz Boesel | (Brazil) Leonardo Cordeiro | (Brazil) Luiz Boesel | Stand-alone event |
| 4 | R2 | Santa Cruz do Sul, Brazil | Autódromo Internacional de Santa Cruz do Sul | 30 August | (Brazil) Claudio Cantelli Jr. | (Brazil) Leonardo Cordeiro | (Brazil) Claudio Cantelli Jr. | Stand-alone event |
| 5 | R1 | Buenos Aires, Argentina | Autódromo Juan y Oscar Gálvez | 12 September | (Brazil) Leonardo Cordeiro | (Brazil) Leonardo Cordeiro | (Brazil) Leonardo Cordeiro | Buenos Aires Grand Prix |
| 5 | R2 | Buenos Aires, Argentina | Autódromo Juan y Oscar Gálvez | 13 September | (Brazil) Leonardo Cordeiro | (Brazil) Leonardo Cordeiro | (Brazil) Leonardo Cordeiro | Buenos Aires Grand Prix |
| 6 | R1 | Piriápolis, Uruguay | Piriápolis Street Circuit | 3 October | (Brazil) Claudio Cantelli Jr. | (Brazil) Claudio Cantelli Jr. | (Brazil) Claudio Cantelli Jr. | Gran Premio de Piriápolis |
| 6 | R2 | Piriápolis, Uruguay | Piriápolis Street Circuit | 4 October | (Brazil) Leonardo Cordeiro | (Brazil) Claudio Cantelli Jr. | (Brazil) Leonardo Cordeiro | Gran Premio de Piriápolis |
| 7 | R1 | São Paulo, Brazil | Autódromo José Carlos Pace | 16 October | (Brazil) Henrique Lambert | Race Cancelled | | Brazilian Grand Prix |
| 7 | R2 | São Paulo, Brazil | Autódromo José Carlos Pace | 17 October | (Brazil) Henrique Lambert | (Brazil) Leonardo Cordeiro | (Brazil) Leonardo Cordeiro | Brazilian Grand Prix |
| 8 | R1 | Campo Grande, Brazil | Autódromo Internacional Orlando Moura | 7 November | (Brazil) Claudio Cantelli Jr. | (Brazil) Leonardo Cordeiro | (Brazil) Claudio Cantelli Jr. | Stand-alone event |
| 8 | R2 | Campo Grande, Brazil | Autódromo Internacional Orlando Moura | 7 November | (Brazil) Leonardo Cordeiro | (Brazil) Leonardo Cordeiro | (Brazil) Henrique Lambert | Stand-alone event |
| 8 | R3 | Campo Grande, Brazil | Autódromo Internacional Orlando Moura | 8 November | (Brazil) Lucas Foresti | (Brazil) Leonardo Cordeiro | (Brazil) Lucas Foresti | Stand-alone event |
| 9 | R1 | Pinhais, Brazil | Autódromo Internacional de Curitiba | 21 November | (Brazil) Leonardo Cordeiro | (Brazil) Leonardo Cordeiro | (Brazil) Leonardo Cordeiro | Stand-alone event |
| 9 | R2 | Pinhais, Brazil | Autódromo Internacional de Curitiba | 22 November | (Brazil) Henrique Lambert | (Brazil) Igor Veras | (Brazil) Leonardo Cordeiro | Stand-alone event |

== Championship standings ==
| Pos | Driver | BRA 1 (Brazil) | BRA 2 (Brazil) | CUR 1 (Brazil) | CUR 2 (Brazil) | JAC 1 (Brazil) | JAC 2 (Brazil) | SCZ 1 (Brazil) | SCZ 2 (Brazil) | BUE 1 (Argentina) | BUE 2 (Argentina) | PIR 1 (Uruguay) | PIR 2 (Uruguay) | INT 1 (Brazil) | INT 2 (Brazil) | CAM 1 (Brazil) | CAM 2 (Brazil) | CAM 3 (Brazil) | CUR 1 (Brazil) | CUR 2 (Brazil) | Pts |
Class A
| 1 | (Brazil) Leonardo Cordeiro | **6** | **1** | **1** | **2** | **1** | **1** | Ret | 3 | **1** | **1** | 9 | **1** | C | 1 | 8 | **2** | 2 | **1** | 1 | 138 |
| 2 | (Brazil) Claudio Cantelli Jr. | 4 | 2 | 4 | 6 | 4 | 3 | 2 | **1** | Ret | 6 | **1** | 4 | C | Ret | **1** | 5 | 3 | 8 | 4 | 96 |
| 3 | (Brazil) Lucas Foresti | Ret | 5 | 3 | 4 | 3 | 2 | 5 | 2 | 6 | 5 | Ret | Ret | C | Ret | 2 | 4 | **1** | 2 | 7 | 81 |
| 4 | (Brazil) Henrique Lambert | | | | | 5 | 9 | 3 | 6 | 2 | 2 | 3 | 2 | **C** | **2** | 5 | 1 | 9 | 7 | **5** | 75 |
| 5 | (Brazil) Yann Cunha | 2 | Ret | 10 | 7 | 2 | 4 | 4 | 7 | 9 | 3 | 2 | 3 | C | Ret | 3 | 8 | 5 | 9 | 2 | 74 |
| 6 | (Brazil) Igor Veras | 7 | 10 | 5 | 5 | 7 | 8 | Ret | 5 | 5 | Ret | 6 | 7 | C | 7 | Ret | 3 | 4 | 6 | 3 | 56 |
| 7 | (Brazil) Luiz Boesel | 3 | Ret | 7 | 10 | 8 | 7 | **1** | 4 | 4 | Ret | 4 | 5 | C | 8 | 11 | 10 | 8 | 4 | 11 | 54 |
| 8 | (Brazil) Nilton Molina | 5 | 6 | 6 | 3 | Ret | 5 | 7 | 13 | 3 | 4 | 5 | 6 | C | Ret | 10 | Ret | 11 | Ret | 6 | 45 |
| 9 | (Brazil) Leonardo de Souza | Ret | 4 | 2 | 1 | 6 | Ret | 8 | 10 | 8 | 7 | | | C | Ret | | | | Ret | 10 | 33 |
| 10 | (Brazil) Fernando Galera | 1 | 3 | Ret | 8 | 11 | 6 | 6 | Ret | | | | | | | | | | | | 23 |
| 11 | (Brazil) Víctor Guerin | | | | | | | | | | | | | C | 3 | 4 | 7 | 10 | | | 15 |
| 12 | (Brazil) André Negrão | | | | | | | | | | | Ret | 11 | C | 10 | | | | | | 4 |
| | (Austria) Walter Grubmüller | | | | | | | | | | | | | C | Ret | | | | | | 0 |
Class B
| 1 | (Brazil) Henrique Martins | 9 | 7 | 11 | 11 | Ret | Ret | 11 | 8 | 7 | 8 | Ret | 8 | C | 5 | 9 | 6 | 6 | 3 | 8 | 132 |
| 2 | (Brazil) Raphael Abbate | 10 | 9 | 8 | 9 | 10 | 10 | 9 | 9 | 11 | Ret | 8 | 10 | C | 6 | 7 | 9 | 7 | 5 | 12 | 132 |
| 3 | (Brazil) Bruno Andrade | 12 | 12 | Ret | 12 | Ret | 11 | 10 | 11 | 10 | 9 | 7 | 9 | C | 4 | 6 | 11 | Ret | Ret | 9 | 110 |
| 4 | (Brazil) Víctor Guerin | 11 | 11 | 9 | Ret | 9 | 12 | 12 | Ret | Ret | 10 | | | | | | | | | | 49 |
| 5 | (Brazil) Lucílio Baumer | 8 | 8 | | | | | | | | | | | | | | | | | | 18 |
| 6 | (Brazil) Leandro Florenzo | | | | | | | 13 | 12 | | | | | C | 9 | | | | | | 14 |
| | (Brazil) Mateus Laba | | | | | | | Ret | Ret | | | | | | | | | | | | 0 |
| Pos | Driver | BRA 1 (Brazil) | BRA 2 (Brazil) | CUR 1 (Brazil) | CUR 2 (Brazil) | JAC 1 (Brazil) | JAC 2 (Brazil) | SCZ 1 (Brazil) | SCZ 2 (Brazil) | BUE 1 (Argentina) | BUE 2 (Argentina) | PIR 1 (Uruguay) | PIR 2 (Uruguay) | INT 1 (Brazil) | INT 2 (Brazil) | CAM 1 (Brazil) | CAM 2 (Brazil) | CAM 3 (Brazil) | CUR 1 (Brazil) | CUR 2 (Brazil) | Pts |

| Colour | Result |
|---|---|
| Gold | Winner |
| Silver | Second place |
| Bronze | Third place |
| Green | Points classification |
| Blue | Non-points classification |
| Blue | Non-classified finish (NC) |
| Purple | Retired, not classified (Ret) |
| Red | Did not qualify (DNQ) |
| Red | Did not pre-qualify (DNPQ) |
| Black | Disqualified (DSQ) |
| White | Did not start (DNS) |
| White | Withdrew (WD) |
| White | Race cancelled (C) |
| Blank | Did not practice (DNP) |
| Blank | Did not arrive (DNA) |
| Blank | Excluded (EX) |

**Bold** – Pole
Italics – Fastest Lap
