= 1997 Buenos Aires Grand Prix =

Formula 1 race

The Buenos Aires Circuit No:6

Results from the 1997 Buenos Aires Grand Prix held at Buenos Aires on September 14, 1997, in the Autódromo Oscar Alfredo Gálvez. The F1 autoracing series first returned to the Argentina track in 1995, after having been absent from the schedule for fourteen years. The F1 drivers would race at this venue for four more years, including the 1997 event, before being dropped again from the schedule after the 1998 season.

== Classification ==
Pos	Driver	Constructor	Laps	Time/Retired
1	(Argentina) Gabriel Furlán	Dallara F394-Fiat	27	38:23.424
2	(Brazil) Bruno Junqueira	Dallara F394-Opel	27	38:27.488
3	(Brazil) Pedro Bartelle	Dallara F394-Mugen	27	38:54.068
4	(Argentina) Martín Basso	Dallara F394-Toyota	27	38:54.360
5	(Argentina) Nicolás Filiberti	Dallara F394-Fiat	27	38:58.681
6	(Argentina) Daniel Belli	Dallara F394-Mugen	27	39:03.899
7	(Argentina) Fabián Malta	Dallara F394-Mugen	27	39:07.355
8	(Brazil) Maurizio Slaviero	Dallara F394-Opel	27	39:09.910
9	(Brazil) Tom Stefani	Dallara F394-Mugen	27	39:09.999
10	(Argentina) Diego Chiozzi	Dallara F390-Fiat	27	39:17.594
11	(Argentina) Gabriel Werner	Dallara F394-Fiat	27	39:25.828
12	(Brazil) Luis Arbotto	Dallara F394-Opel	27	39:27.964
13	(Brazil) Jaime Melo	Dallara F390-Mugen	27	39:29.265
14	(Brazil) David Muffato	Dallara F394-Toyota	27	39:47.658
15	(Argentina) Federico Sanz	Ralt RT34-Mugen	26	
DNF	(Argentina) Juan Manuel López	Dallara F394-Mugen	22	
DNF	(Brazil) Susane Carvalho	Dallara F394-Mugen	10	
DNF	(Brazil) Marcello Ventre	Dallara F394-Mugen	4	
DNF	(Brazil) Leonardo Nienkotter	Dallara F394-Mugen	0	
