= 2009 Buenos Aires Grand Prix Race 1 =

Motorsport race in Argentina

The Buenos Aires Circuit No:9

Results from the 2009 Buenos Aires Grand Prix held at Buenos Aires on September 12, 2009, in the Autódromo Oscar Alfredo Gálvez. The race was the first race for the 2009 Buenos Aires Grand Prix of 2009 Formula Three Sudamericana season.

== Classification ==
Pos	Driver	Constructor	Laps	Time/Retired
1	(Brazil) Leonardo Cordeiro	Dallara-Berta	22	30'13.115"
2	(Brazil) Henrique Lambert	Dallara-Berta	22	
3	(Brazil) Nilton Molina	Dallara-Berta	22	
4	(Brazil) Igor Veras	Dallara-Berta	22	
5	(Brazil) Luiz Boesel	Dallara-Berta	22	
6	(Brazil) Lucas Foresti	Dallara-Berta	22	
7	(Brazil) Henrique Martins	Dallara-Berta	22	
8	(Brazil) Leonardo de Souza	Dallara-Berta	22	
9	(Brazil) Yan Cunha	Dallara-Berta	22	
10	(Brazil) Bruno Andrade	Dallara-Berta	22	
11	(Brazil) Raphael Abbate	Dallara-Berta	20	
Ret	(Brazil) Claudio Cantelli	Dallara-Berta	12	DNF
Ret	(Brazil) Victor Guerin	Dallara-Berta	4	DNF
