= 1999 Buenos Aires Grand Prix =

The Buenos Aires Circuit No:8

Results from the 1999 Buenos Aires Grand Prix held at Buenos Aires on August 29, 1999, in the Autódromo Oscar Alfredo Gálvez.

== Classification ==
Pos	Driver	Constructor	Laps	Time/Retired
1	(Brazil) Eduardo Pamplona	Dallara F394-Opel	35	3735.018
2	(Brazil) Leonardo Nienkotter	Dallara F394-Opel	35	37:36.110
3	(Brazil) Hoover Orsi	Dallara F394-Mugen	35	37:37.268
4	(Brazil) Jaime Melo	Dallara F394-Mugen	35	37:37.355
5	(Brazil) Vítor Meira	Dallara F394-Mugen	35	37:37.844
6	(Brazil) Ricardo Sperafico	Dallara F394-Mugen	35	37:38.298
7	(Brazil) Rodrigo Sperafico	Dallara F394-Mugen	35	37:38.991
8	(Brazil) Thiago Medeiros	Dallara F394-Mugen	35	37:45.066
9	(Argentina) Martín Basso	Dallara F394-Mitsubishi	35	37:52.847
10	(Argentina) Daniel Belli	Dallara F394-Opel	35	37:53.530
11	(Argentina) Gabriel Werner	Dallara F394-Mitsubishi	35	37:55.600
12	(Argentina) Gabriel Furlán	Dallara F394-Mitsubishi	35	37:56.410
13	(Brazil) João Paulo de Oliveira	Dallara F394-Mugen	35	38:15.291
14	(Brazil) Fernando Rama	Dallara F394-Mitsubishi	35	38:24.733
15	(Brazil) Sergio Koffes Jr.	Dallara F394-Opel	35	38:37.981
16	(Brazil) Leandro Guimard	Dallara F394-Fiat	35	38:42.667
17	(Brazil) Robby Perez	Dallara F394-Mugen	34	
DNF	(Brazil) Rodrigo Yungh	Dallara F394-Mugen	26	
DNF	(Brazil) Paulo Pizzoni	Dallara F394-Mugen	5	
DNF	(Brazil) Tom Stefani	Dallara F394-Mitsubishi	0	
