= Sport Prototipo Argentino =

Motorsport championship in Argentina from 1969 to 1973

The Sport Prototipo Argentino (Argentine Sport Prototype) was a motorsport championship held in Argentina between 1969 and 1973.

The championship was established in 1969, two years after Turismo Carretera implemented significant changes in its regulations that allowed for significant modifications to the compact car chassis of that era. After two seasons, this new exclusive championship for sport prototypes was created while Turismo Carretera continued to feature production cars. The vehicles quickly evolved from production chassis-based cars, with 160 HP engines, to prototypes such as the Berta LR, which followed the International Championship for Makes regulations and featured 300 HP engines.

The championship disappeared in 1973 after three races, mainly due to high costs and a low number of entries.

== Champions ==
Year	Driver	Car
1969	Eduardo Copello	Numa-Tornado
1970	Néstor García-Veiga	Chelco-Chevrolet
1971	Luis Rubén Di Palma	Berta-Tornado
1972	Luis Rubén Di Palma	Berta-Tornado
1973	Canceled after three races	

== Gallery ==
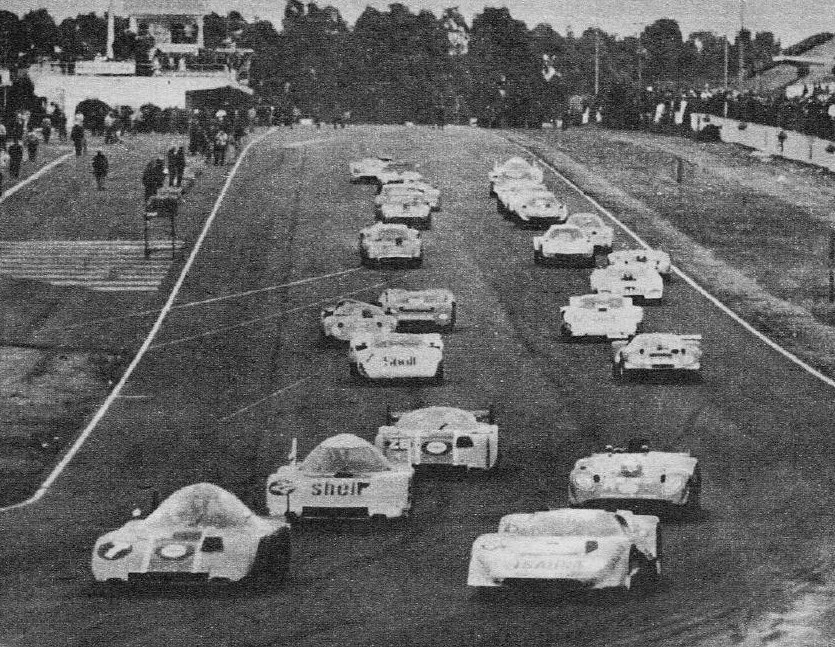
Race start in Buenos Aires.

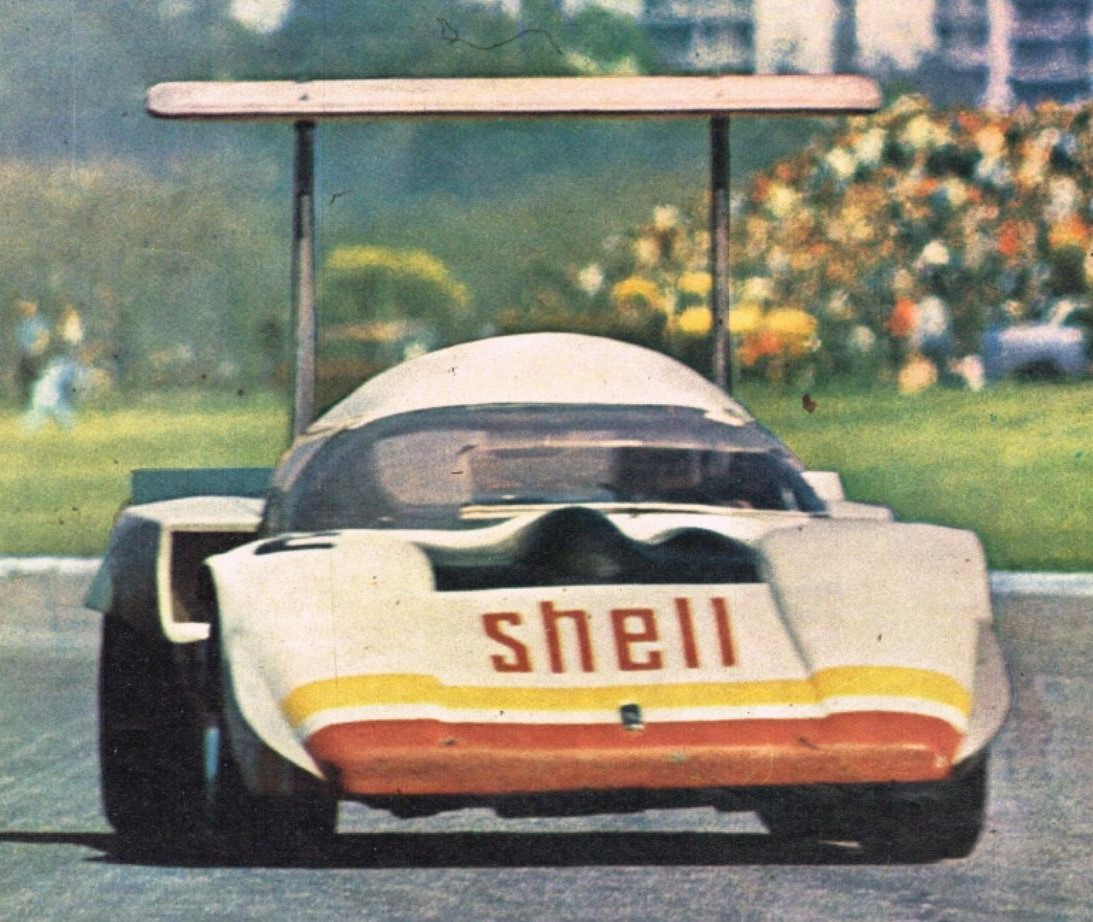
Numa-Tornado, first championship winning car.

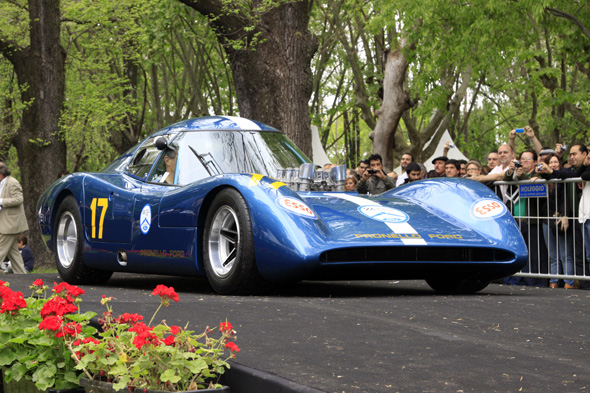
Huayra Pronello-Ford.

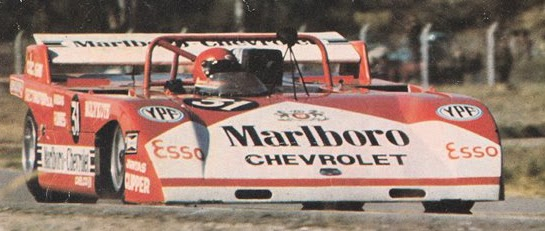
Chelco-Chevrolet driven by Néstor García-Veiga, 1972.

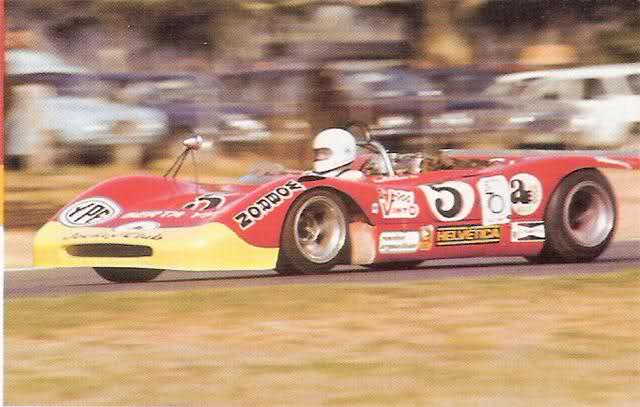
Luis Rubén Di Palma and Berta-Tornado, winners of the last two championships.
