= Dogo SS-2000 =

Argentinian prototype car

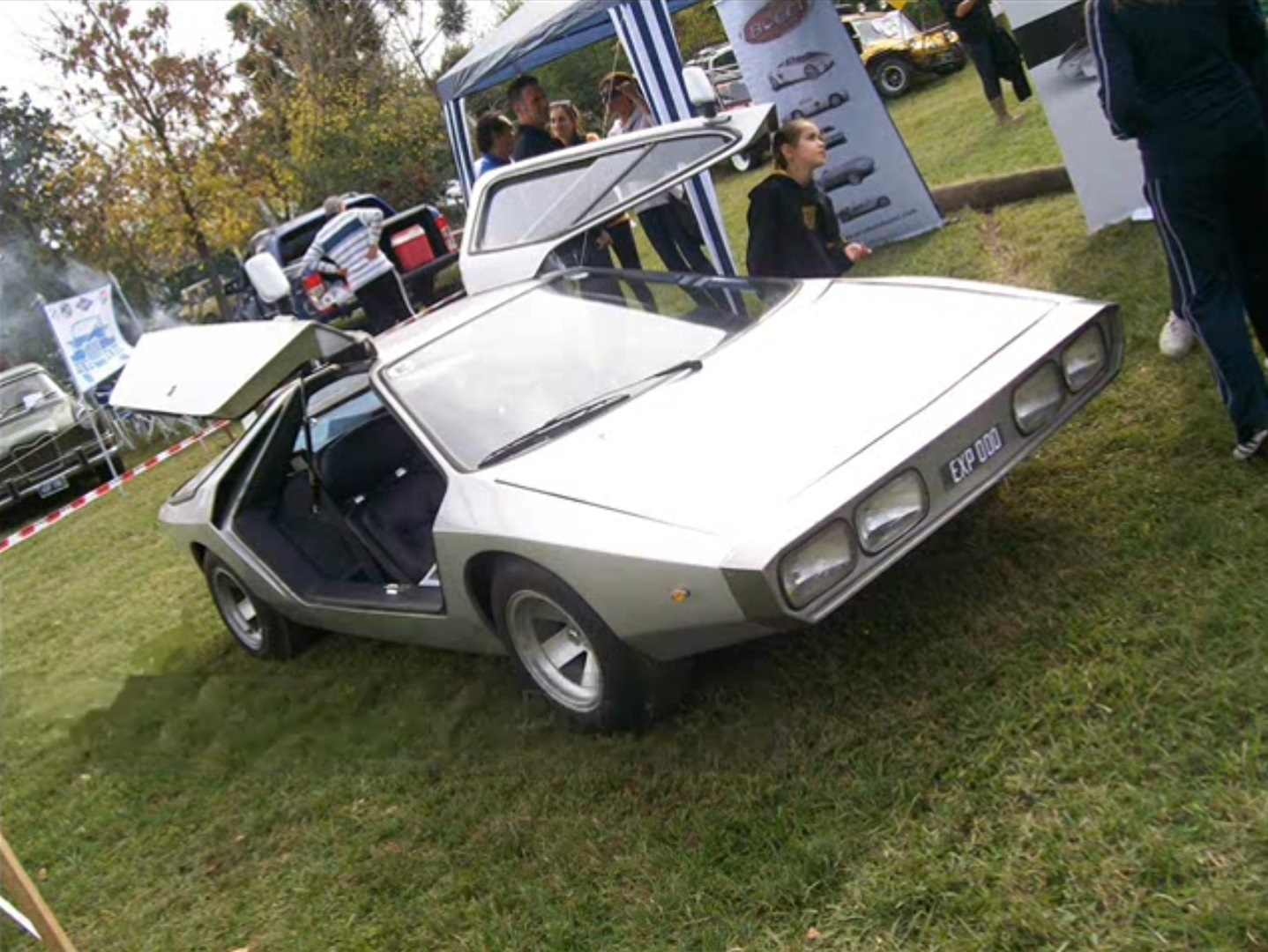

Overview
- Production: 1969
- Assembly: Munro, Argentina
- Designer: Clemar Bucci

Body and chassis
- Class: Concept car
- Body style: 2-door coupe
- Layout: Rear-engine, rear-wheel-drive

Dimensions
- Wheelbase: 2350 mm
- Length: 3900 mm
- Width: 1810 mm
- Height: 1040 mm
- Curb weight: 700 kg

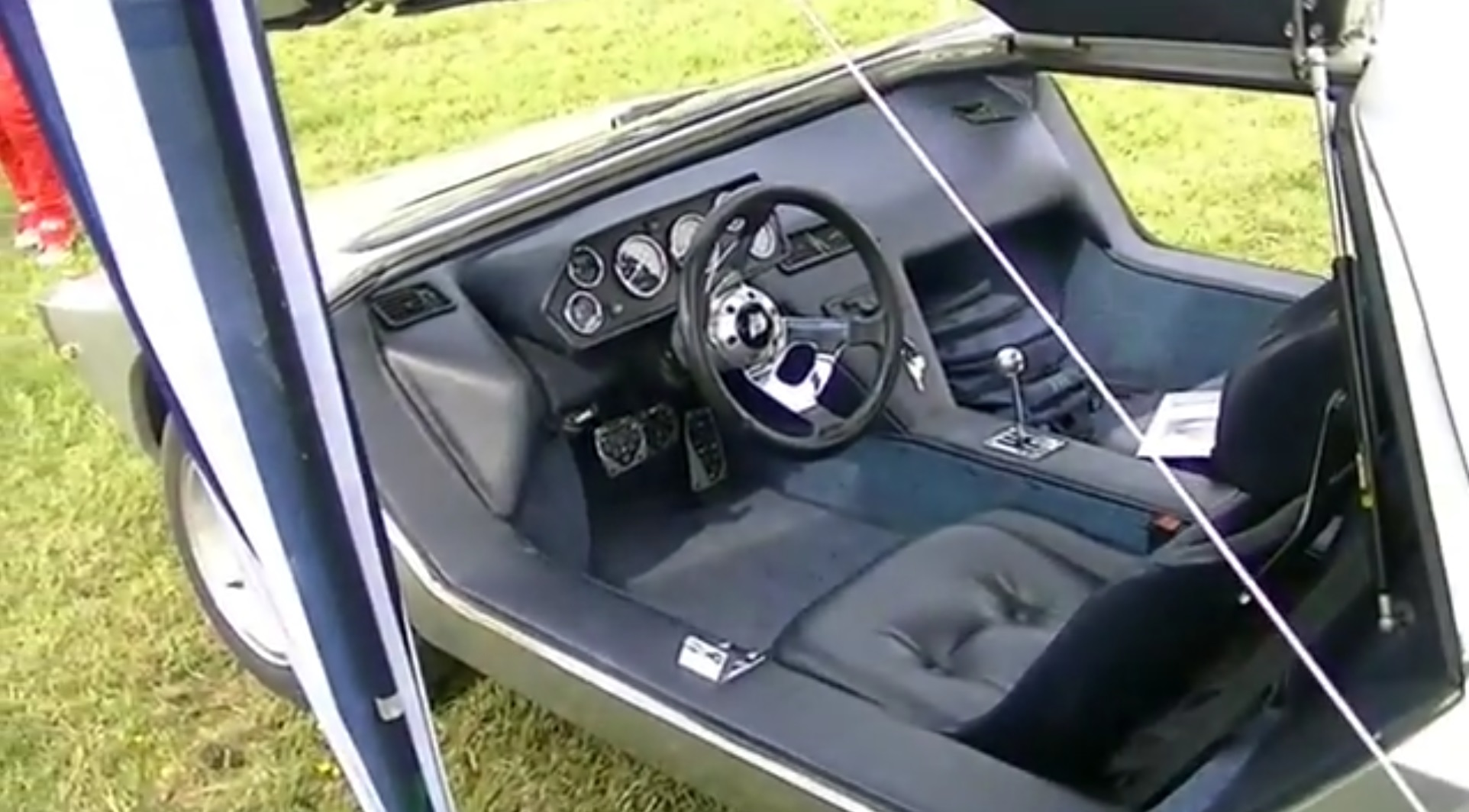
Dogo SS-2000's interior.

The Dogo SS-2000 is a prototype car that was built in Argentina in 1969. It was presented in 1970 at the Human Comfort Exhibition (in Castilian: Exposición del Confort Humano).

== Design and mechanics ==
This prototype was designed and built by the Argentine racing driver and mechanic Clemar Bucci in his workshop located in Munro (Vicente López Partido, Buenos Aires). It took him five months to make the car, with the participation of his brother Rolando Bucci and a group of collaborators.

The Dogo SS-2000 was a grand tourer with a wedge-shaped design, rectilinear lines and smooth panels. Striking gull-wing doors stood out in its design. The body was made of reinforced plastic and was mounted on a box-shaped, single center beam frame. It had a 2000 cc L4 engine with 160 HP sourced from a Peugeot 504 car, four-speed synchronized gearbox sourced from a Porsche 911, and four-wheel disc brakes.

== Performance ==
The people who built the car stated that its top speed was 228 km/h, helped by its light weight of 700 kg.

The car is preserved in the Bucci Museum in Zenón Pereyra, Santa Fe Province.
