= 1995 Buenos Aires Grand Prix =

The Buenos Aires Circuit No:6

Results from the 1995 Buenos Aires Grand Prix held at Buenos Aires on April 9, 1995, in the Autódromo Oscar Alfredo Gálvez.The race was the third race for the 1995 Buenos Aires Grand Prix of Formula Three Sudamericana.

== Classification ==
Pos	Driver	Constructor	Laps	Time/Retired
1	(Brazil) Max Wilson	Dallara-Opel	10	
2	(Argentina) Ricardo Risatti	Dallara-Honda	10	
3	(Brazil) Marcelo Ventre	Dallara-Fiat	10	
4	(Argentina) Gabriel Furlán	Dallara-Fiat	10	
5	(Argentina) Omar Martínez	Tom's-Toyota	10	
6	(Brazil) Bruno Junqueira	Dallara-Honda	10	
7	(Brazil) Ruben Fontes	Dallara-Honda	10	
8	(Argentina) Mario Fartuszek	Dallara-Fiat	10	
9	(Argentina) Emiliano Spataro	Dallara-Fiat	10	
10	(Brazil) Marcelo Santos	Dallara-Honda	10	
11	(Argentina) Nicolás Filiberti	Dallara-Fiat	10	
12	(Brazil) Tom Stefani	Dallara-Honda	10	
13	(Brazil) Lidoro Da Silva	Dallara-Opel	10	
14	(Brazil) Marcelo Maciel	Ralt-Volkswagen	10	
15	(Argentina) Anibal Zaniratto	Dallara-Fiat	10	
16	(Brazil) Luiz Donizetti	Ralt-Honda	10	
17	(Chile) Ramón Ibarra	Ralt-Volkswagen	7	
18	(Paraguay) Jorge Aranda	Dallara-Fiat	7	
19	(Brazil) Ricardo Zonta	Ralt-Honda	4	
20	(Argentina) Sebastian Martino	Ralt-Volkswagen	3	
21	(Argentina) Omar Suriani	Ralt-Volkswagen	1	
