= 1941 Buenos Aires Grand Prix =

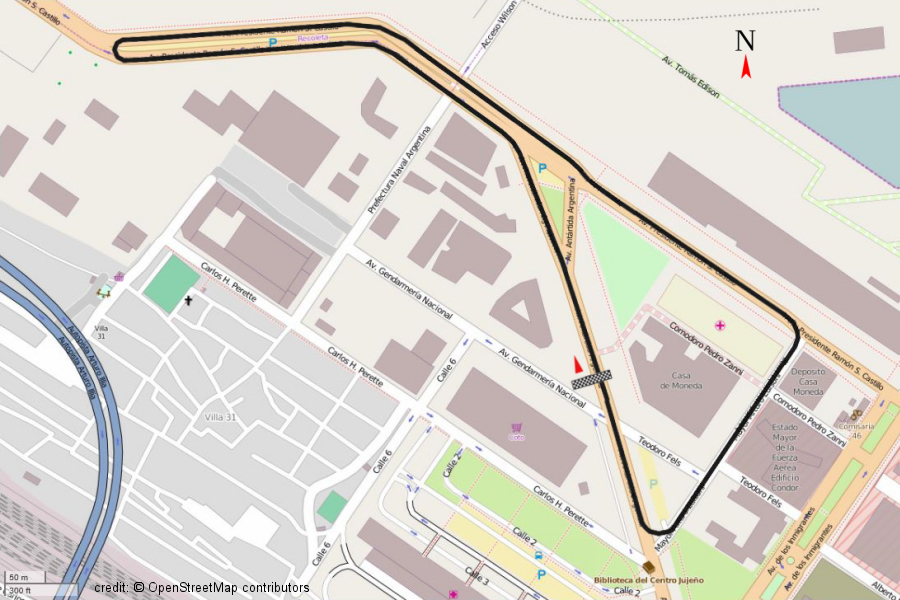

Race details
- Date: 23 November 1941
- Official name: Premio Ciudad de Buenos Aires
- Location: Retiro, Buenos Aires, Argentina
- Course: Public streets
- Course length: 2.410 km (1.497 miles)
- Distance: 40 laps, 96.4 km (59.9 miles)

Fastest lap
Driver	(Argentina) José Canziani	Alfa Romeo
- Time: 1m 17.1s 112.53 km/h (69.92 mp/h)

Podium
First	(Argentina) José Canziani	Alfa Romeo Tipo 308
Second	(Brazil) Oldemar Ramos	Alfa Romeo 8C-35
Third	(Argentina) Mario Chiozza	Mercury Bi-motor

The 1941 Buenos Aires Grand Prix (also known as the Premio Ciudad de Buenos Aires) was a Formula Libre handicap race, organized by the ACA (Automóvil Club Argentino) and held on 23 November 1941 at the Retiro street circuit in Buenos Aires.

Entries were open for the national mechanic "Mecánica Nacional" class, based on series cars (Ford, Chevrolet, Hudson) and the "Coches Especiales" Grand Prix cars. Racing started with a preliminary Mecánica Nacional class elimination round (best five qualifying for the GP) which was won by Mario P. Chiozza (Bi-Motor Mercury). The class group received a one-minute handicap at the start of the GP main event.

The GP class included Riganti's new Maserati 8CL (chassis 3034) that was entered in the 1940 Indianapolis.

== Classification ==
Pos	No	Driver	Constructor	Laps	Time/Retired
1	40	(Argentina) José Canziani	Alfa Romeo Tipo 308	40	53m49.5
2	39	(Brazil) Oldemar Ramos	Alfa Romeo 8C-35	40	+ 42.0
3	26	(Argentina) Mario Chiozza	Mercury Bi-motor	39	+ 1 Lap
4	41	(Brazil) Francisco Landi	Alfa Romeo Tipo-B P3	39	+ 1 Lap
5	44	(Brazil) Gerardo Avelar	Alfa Romeo	38	+ 2 Laps
6	43	(Argentina) Eric Forrest Greene	Maserati 6CM	38	+ 2 Laps
7	16	(Argentina) Rodolfo Martini	Ford Model A special	38	+ 2 Laps
8	22	(Argentina) Roque Brisco	Ford Model A special	36	+ 4 Laps
9	45	(Argentina) Domingo Ochoteco	Alfa Romeo	36	+ 4 Laps
10	3	(Argentina) Alfredo Pián	Ford Model A special	36	+ 4 Laps
11	10	(Argentina) Mario Sessarego	Ford Model A special	34	+ 6 Laps
Ret	42	(Argentina) Adriano Malusardi	Alfa Romeo Tipo-B P3	31	
Ret	4	(Argentina) Rossi	Ford Model A special	27	
Ret	46	(Argentina) Raoul Riganti	Maserati 8CL	?	
DNS	?	(Italy) Victorio Coppoli	Mercedes	?	Did Not Start

Grand Prix Race
1941 Grand Prix season
Previous race: 1936 Buenos Aires Grand Prix	Buenos Aires Grand Prix	Next race: 1947 Buenos Aires Grand Prix (I)
