= 1989 Buenos Aires Grand Prix – Race 2 =

The Buenos Aires Circuit No:6

The 1989 Buenos Aires Grand Prix was held at Buenos Aires on December 17, 1989, in the Autódromo Oscar Alfredo Gálvez.

== Classification ==
Pos	Driver	Constructor	Laps	Time/Retired
1	(Argentina) Gabriel Furlán	Dallara - Alfa Romeo	39	50m09.5
2	(Argentina) Guillermo Kissling	Berta - Renault	39	50m20.1
3	(Brazil) Leonel Friedrich	Reynard - Volkswagen	39	50m30.2
4	(Argentina) Nestor Gurini	Berta - Volkswagen	39	
5	(Argentina) Cesar Pegoraro	Reynard - Volkswagen	39	
6	(Brazil) Christian Fittipaldi	Reynard - Alfa Romeo	39	
7	(Argentina) Luis Belloso	Berta - Renault	39	
8	(Brazil) "Alencar" Jr	Dallara - Alfa Romeo	39	
9	(Brazil) Vital Machado	Reynard - Alfa Romeo	39	
10	(Argentina) Alfonso Rangel	Reynard - Alfa Romeo	39	
