= 2009 Buenos Aires Grand Prix Race 2 =

2009 motorrace in Argentina

The Buenos Aires Circuit No:9

Results from the 2009 Buenos Aires Grand Prix held at Buenos Aires on September 13, 2009, in the Autódromo Oscar Alfredo Gálvez. The race was the second race for the 2009 Buenos Aires Grand Prix of 2009 Formula Three Sudamericana season.

== Classification ==
Pos	Driver	Constructor	Laps	Time/Retired
1	(Brazil) Leonardo Cordeiro	Dallara-Berta	22	30'23.153"
2	(Brazil) Henrique Lambert	Dallara-Berta	22	
3	(Brazil) Yann Cunha	Dallara-Berta	22	
4	(Brazil) Nilton Molina	Dallara-Berta	22	
5	(Brazil) Lucas Foresti	Dallara-Berta	22	
6	(Brazil) Claudio Cantelli	Dallara-Berta	22	
7	(Brazil) Leonardo de Souza	Dallara-Berta	22	
8	(Brazil) Henrique Martins	Dallara-Berta	22	
9	(Brazil) Bruno Andrade	Dallara-Berta	22	
10	(Brazil) Victor Guerin	Dallara-Berta	22	
Ret	(Brazil) Luiz Boesel	Dallara-Berta	11	DNF
Ret	(Brazil) Igor Veras	Dallara-Berta	7	DNF
Ret	(Brazil) Raphael Abbate	Dallara-Berta	0	DNF
