= Gastón Perkins =

Argentine racing driver

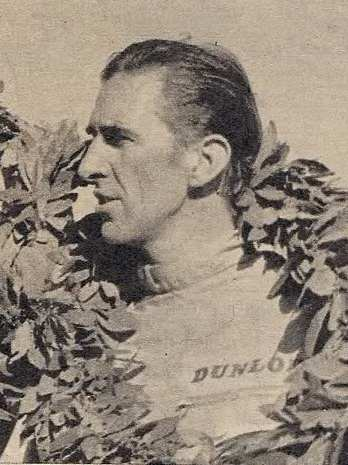
Gastón Perkins (1968)

Gastón Carlos Perkins (April 15, 1928– April 19, 2006) was an Argentine racing driver. He won the Turismo Carretera championship in 1969.

== Racing career ==
Perkins started his racing career in 1952. He was one of the Argentine drivers who participated in the Marathon de la Route (Nürburgring) in 1969 with Eduardo Rodríguez Canedo and Jorge Cupeiro.

Perkins won three titles in Turismo Nacional (Class B) in 1963, 1964 and 1965, with Renault Dauphine. In 1969 he was Turismo Carretera champion with a Torino.

Perkins died in his hometown, Juan Bautista Alberdi, Buenos Aires Province, in 2006 at the age of 78.

Sporting positions
Preceded by Carlos Pairetti	Turismo Carretera champion 1969	Succeeded by Rubén Luis di Palma
