= Circuito Retiro =

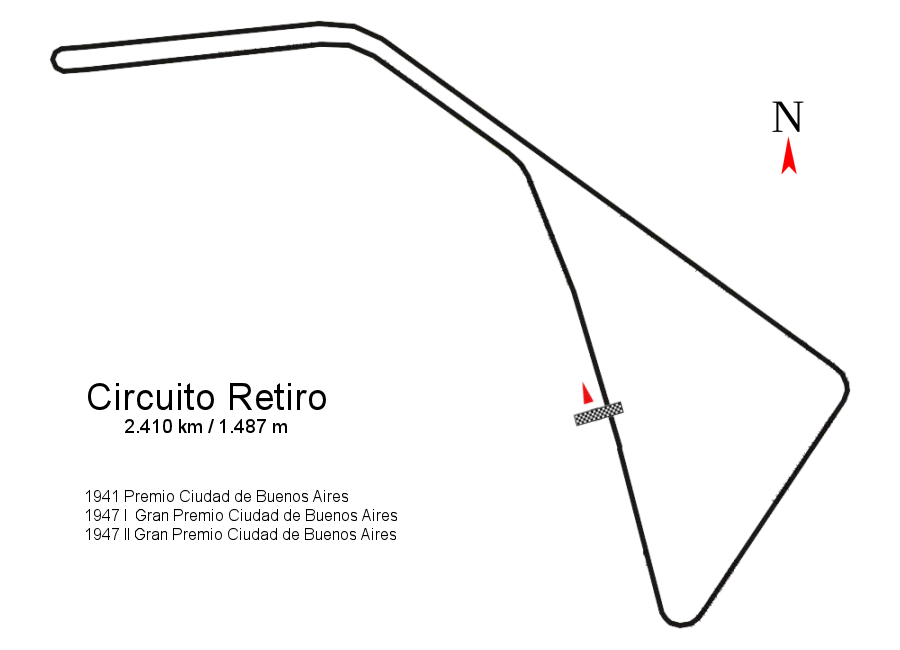
- Grand Prix Circuit (1941, 1947)
- Location: Retiro, Buenos Aires
- Coordinates: 34°35′02″S 58°22′23″W
- Opened: 1941
- Closed: 1947
- Major events: Buenos Aires Grand Prix (1941, 1947)

Grand Prix Circuit (1941, 1947)
- Length: 2.410 km (1.498 mi)
- Turns: 6
- Race lap record: 1:06.000 ( (Italy) Luigi Villoresi, Maserati 4CL, 1947 (I), Fuerza Libre)

The Circuito Retiro, commonly known as the Retiro Circuit was a Grand Prix street circuit in Buenos Aires (Argentina). The 2.410 km (1.498 mi) circuit is best known for hosting the first official Buenos Aires Grand Prix (I) Gran Premio Ciudad de Buenos Aires, official name: Gran Premio Juan Domingo Perón) on February 9, 1947, as the first organized international event by the Automóvil Club Argentino.

The 1947 Grand Prix at Retiro marks the start of the South American Temporada racing series.

== Buenos Aires Grand Prix 1941, 1947 ==
Year	Name	Date	Winning drivers	Constructor	Regulations	Report
1941	(Argentina) Premio Ciudad de Buenos Aires	November 23	(Argentina) José Canziani	Alfa Romeo 8C-35	Formula Libre	Report
1947 I	(Argentina) I General Juan Perón Grand Prix	February 9	(Italy) Luigi Villoresi	Maserati 4CL	Fuerza Libre	Report
1947 II	(Argentina) I Eva Duarte Perón Grand Prix	February 16	(Italy) Luigi Villoresi	Maserati 4CL	Fuerza Libre	Report
