= Buenos Aires Grand Prix (motor racing) =

Motor race held in Argentina

- Autódromo Juan y Oscar Gálvez

Race information
- Number of times held: 45
- First held: 1930; 96 years ago
- Last held: 2024; 2 years ago
- Most wins (drivers): (Argentina) Juan Manuel Fangio (6)
- Most wins (constructors): (Italy) Dallara (11)
- Circuit length: 5.651 km (3.503 miles)
- Race length: 2 x 124.322 km (2 x 77.066 miles)
- Laps: 2 x 22

Last race (2024)

Pole position
- (Argentina) Facundo Chapur; AyP Competición; 1:29.375

Podium
- 1. (Argentina) Juan Martín Trucco; Di Meglio Motorsport; 49:10.110; 2. (Argentina) Julián Santero; LCA Racing; 49:10.732; 3. (Argentina) Agustín Canapino; Canning Motorsport; 49:11.239

Fastest lap
- (Argentina) Juan Martín Trucco; Di Meglio Motorsport; 1:30.127

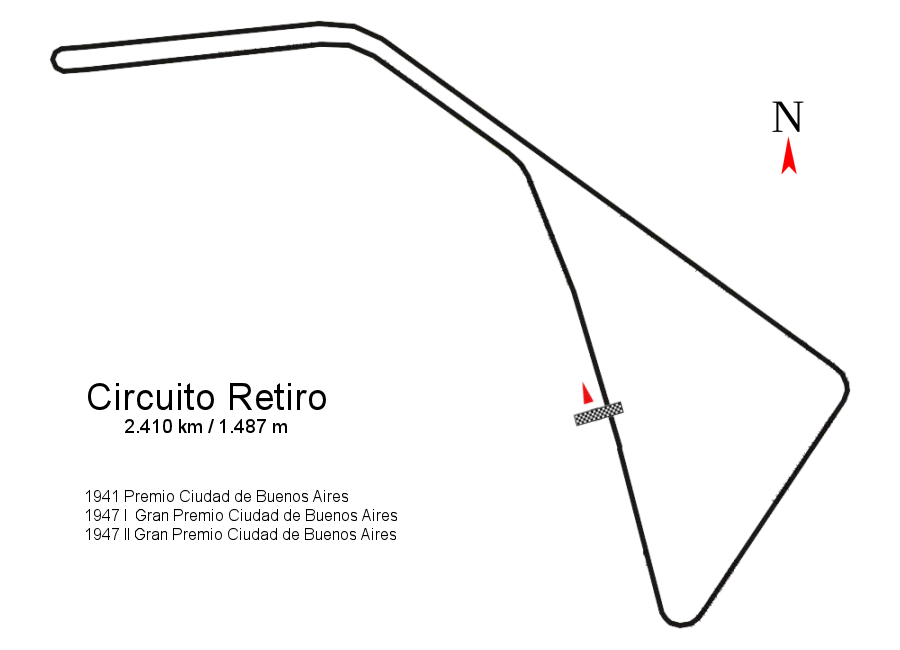
Circuit Retiro 1947

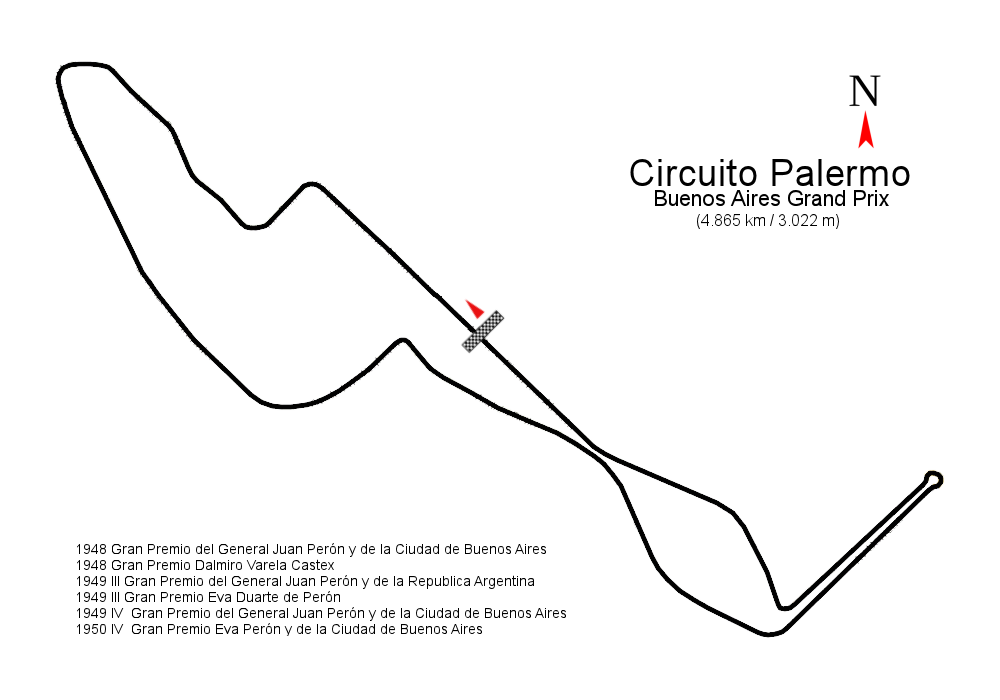
Circuit Palermo 1948-1950

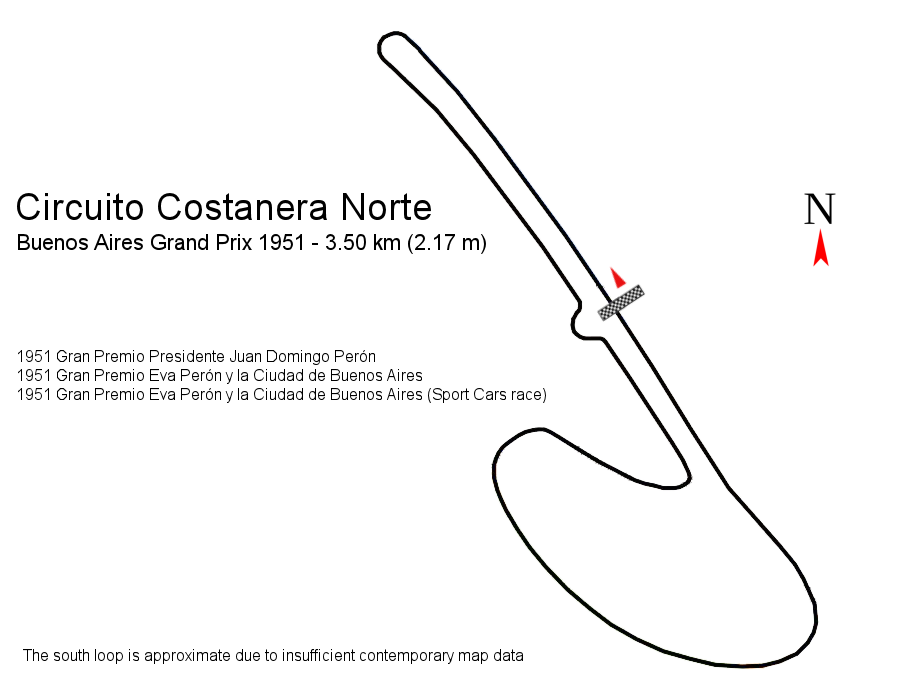
Circuit Costanera Norte 1951

Circuit Galvez No.4 1952

Circuit Galvez No.2 1953-1960

Circuit Galvez No.15 1966-1968

Circuit Galvez No.12 1978, 2023-2024

Circuit Galvez No.6 1987-2009

The Buenos Aires Grand Prix (Spanish: Gran Premio de Buenos Aires) is a motor race held in Buenos Aires, Argentina.

== History ==
The event was first held at the Costanera circuit from the early 1930s until 1936 and then continued in 1941 at the Retiro circuit. After a six-year break and General Juan Peron in office, racing resumed at Retiro in 1947 with the start of the South American "Temporada" Grand Prix series to be contested twice a year under Formula Libre regulations. Italian Luigi Villoresi won all 1947 Temporada events. The race regularly attracted Brazilian and European drivers and also Argentine drivers such as Juan Manuel Fangio and José Froilán González were now competing in Europe on a regular basis. For the 1948 Grand Prix season, the race was moved to the Palermo circuit where it would remain to host six of twelve "Peron Cup" races until the end of 1950. In 1951, the Costanera Norte circuit would host its last three Grand Prix events before the 1951 completion of the Autodromo 17 de Octubre (October 17), a purpose-built circuit for major Grand Prix series which would host various editions of the Buenos Aires Grand Prix from 1952 until 2009 with the exception of the 1956 event held at the General San Martin circuit in Mendoza.

In 2023, the name was revived for the Argentine stock car racing championship Turismo Carretera.

- 1930–1952: Argentine Formula Libre and various Sports Car Grand Prix events
- 1953–1960: Formula Libre races
- 1964–1968 (1978): Formula 2, Formula 3 and Formula Junior races
- 1987–2009: Formula Three Sudamericana
- 2023–present: Turismo Carretera

== Results ==
Formula Libre - Temporada - Pre WW2 - General Juan Perón and Eva Perón Cup Series
Year	Name	Circuit	Date	Winning drivers	Winning constructor	Regulations	Report
1932	(Argentina) Gran Premio Ciudad de Buenos Aires	Costanera Sur	July 3	(Argentina) Domingo Bucci	De Soto-Chrysler	Formula Libre	Report
1936	(Argentina) Gran Premio Ciudad de Buenos Aires	Costanera Sur	October 18	(Argentina) Carlos Arzani	Alfa Romeo 2900 GP	Fuerza Libre	Report
1941	(Argentina) Gran Premio Ciudad de Buenos Aires	Retiro Circuit	November 23	(Argentina) José Canziani	Alfa Romeo 8C-35	Formula Libre	Report
1947	(Argentina) I General Juan Perón Grand Prix	Retiro Circuit	February 8–9	(Italy) Luigi Villoresi	Maserati 4CL	Fuerza Libre	Report
1947	(Argentina) I Eva Duarte Perón Grand Prix	Retiro Circuit	February 15–16	(Italy) Luigi Villoresi	Maserati 4CL	Fuerza Libre	Report
1948	(Argentina) II Gran Premio del Gral Juan Perón (C)	Palermo Circuit	January 17	(Italy) Luigi Villoresi	Maserati 4CL	Formula Libre	Report
1948	(Argentina) II Eva Duarte Perón Grand Prix (Castex)	Palermo Circuit	February 14	(Italy) Luigi Villoresi	Maserati 4CL	Formula Libre	Report
1949	(Argentina) III Gran Premio del Gral Juan Perón (C)	Palermo Circuit	January 29	(Italy) Alberto Ascari	Maserati 4CL	Formula Libre	Report
1949	(Argentina) III Gran Premio Eva Duarte de Perón	Palermo Circuit	February 6	(Argentina) Óscar Alfredo Gálvez	Alfa Romeo 308	Formula Libre	Report
1949	(Argentina) IV Gran Premio del Gral Juan Perón (C)	Palermo Circuit	December 18	(Italy) Alberto Ascari	Ferrari 166 FL	Formula Libre	Report
1950	(Argentina) IV Gran Premio Eva Perón (Ciudad)	Palermo Circuit	January 8	(Italy) Luigi Villoresi	Ferrari 166 FL	Formula Libre	Report
1951	(Argentina) V Gran Premio Gral Perón (C)	Costanera Norte	February 18	(Argentina) José Froilán González	Ferrari 166 FL	Formula Libre	Report
1951	(Argentina) V Gran Premio Eva Perón (C)	Costanera Norte	February 25	(Argentina) José Froilán González	Ferrari 166 FL	Formula Libre	Report
1951	(Argentina) V Gran Premio Eva Perón (C)(Sport)	Costanera Norte	March 18	(United States) John Fitch	Allard J2-Cadillac	Formula Libre	Report
1952	(Argentina) VI Gran Premio Presidente Perón	Gálvez Circuit No.4	March 9	(Argentina) Juan Manuel Fangio	Ferrari 166 FL	Formula Libre	Report
1952	(Argentina) VI Gran Premio Eva Duarte de Perón	Gálvez Circuit No.4	March 16	(Argentina) Juan Manuel Fangio	Ferrari 166 FL	Formula Libre	Report
(C = de la Ciudad) Sources:

Formula Libre - Formula 2 - Formula 3 - Formula Junior
Year	Name	Circuit	Date	Winning drivers	Winning constructor	Regulations	Report
1953	(Argentina) Gran Premio Ciudad de Buenos Aires	Gálvez Circuit No.4	February 1	(Italy) Nino Farina	Ferrari 500	Formula Libre	Report
1954	(Argentina) Gran Premio de Buenos Aires *	Gálvez Circuit No.4	January 31	(France) Maurice Trintignant	Ferrari 625	Formula Libre	Report
1955	(Argentina) Gran Premio de Buenos Aires *	Gálvez Circuit No.4	January 30	(Argentina) Juan Manuel Fangio	Mercedes-Benz W196	Formula Libre	Report
1956	(Argentina) Gran Premio de Buenos Aires *	Mendoza (San Martin)	February 5	(Argentina) Juan Manuel Fangio	Lancia Ferrari D-50	Formula Libre	Report
1957	(Argentina) Gran Premio de Buenos Aires *	Gálvez Circuit No.4	January 27	(Argentina) Juan Manuel Fangio	Maserati 250F	Formula Libre	Report
1958	(Argentina) XIV Gran Premio de Buenos Aires *	Gálvez Circuit No.4	February 2	(Argentina) Juan Manuel Fangio	Maserati 250F	Formula Libre	Report
1959	(Argentina) Gran Premio de Buenos Aires *	Gálvez Circuit No.2	March 1	(Argentina) Jesús Iglesias	Iglesias-Chevrolet	Formula Libre	Report
1960	(Argentina) XV Gran Premio de Buenos Aires *	Sarmiento Córdoba	February 14	(France) Maurice Trintignant	Cooper T51-Climax	Formula Libre	Report
1964	(Argentina) Gran Premio Internacional (Ciudad)	Gálvez Circuit No.2	February 16	(Switzerland) Silvio Moser	Brabham BT6-Ford/Holbay	Formula Junior	Report
1964	(Argentina) Gran Premio Internacional ACA	Gálvez Circuit No.4	March 8	(Switzerland) Silvio Moser	Brabham BT6-Ford/Holbay	Formula Junior	Report
1966	(Argentina) Gran Premio Internacional (Ciudad)	Gálvez Circuit No.2	January 23	(United Kingdom) Chris Irwin	Brabham BT16-Cosworth	Formula 3	Report
1967	(Argentina) Gran Premio de Buenos Aires *	Gálvez Circuit No.2	January 22	(France) Jean-Pierre Beltoise	Matra MS5-Cosworth	Formula 3	Report
1967	(Argentina) Gran Premio de Buenos Aires *	Gálvez Circuit No.2	February 12	(France) Jean-Pierre Beltoise	Matra MS5-Cosworth	Formula 3	Report
1968	(Argentina) Gran Premio YPF 1968	Gálvez Circuit No.9	December 1	(Italy) Ernesto Brambilla	Ferrari Dino 166 V6	Formula 2	Report
1968	(Argentina) Gran Premio Argentine Airlines	Gálvez Circuit No.6	December 22	(United Kingdom) Piers Courage	Brabham BT23C-Cosworth	Formula 2	Report
1978	(Argentina) I Premio de Buenos Aires *	Gálvez Circuit No.9	November 12	(Brazil) Ingo Hoffmann	March 782-BMW	Formula 2	Report
(* Full name = Ciudad de Buenos Aires) Sources:

Formula 2 (Codasur *)
Year	Name	Circuit	Date	Winning drivers	Winning constructor	Regulations	Report
1983	(Argentina) Gran Premio Ciudad de Buenos Aires 1983*	Gálvez Circuit No.4	September 4	(Argentina) Guillermo Kissling	Berta-Renault	Formula 2 *	Report
1983	(Argentina) Gran Premio Ciudad de Buenos Aires 1983 II*	Gálvez Circuit No.4	December 18	(Argentina) Miguel Ángel Guerra	Berta-Renault	Formula 2 *	Report
1985	(Argentina) Gran Premio Ciudad de Buenos Aires 1985*	Gálvez Circuit No.4	September 8	(Argentina) Gustavo Sommi	Berta-Renault	Formula 2 *	Report

Formula Three Sudamericana
Year	Name	Circuit	Date	Winning drivers	Winning constructor	Report
1987	(Argentina) Gran Premio Ciudad de Buenos Aires 1987	Gálvez Circuit No.6		(Argentina) Guillermo Maldonado	Berta-Volkswagen	Report
1987	(Argentina) Gran Premio Ciudad de Buenos Aires 1987	Gálvez Circuit No.6		(Brazil) Leonel Friedrich	Berta-Volkswagen	Report
1987	(Argentina) Gran Premio Ciudad de Buenos Aires 1987	Gálvez Circuit No.6	December 6	(Argentina) Gabriel Furlán	Berta-Volkswagen	Report
1989	(Argentina) Gran Premio Ciudad de Buenos Aires 1989	Gálvez Circuit No.6	September 17	(Brazil) Leonel Friedrich	Reynard-Volkswagen	Report
1989	(Argentina) Gran Premio Ciudad de Buenos Aires 1989	Gálvez Circuit No.6	December 17	(Argentina) Gabriel Furlán	Dallara-Alfa Romeo	Report
1990	(Argentina) Gran Premio Ciudad de Buenos Aires 1990	Gálvez Circuit No.6		(Brazil) Tom Stefani	Reynard-Volkswagen	Report
1991	(Argentina) Gran Premio Ciudad de Buenos Aires 1991	Gálvez Circuit No.6	April 14	(Brazil) Affonso Giaffone	Ralt-Volkswagen	Report
1991	(Argentina) Gran Premio Ciudad de Buenos Aires 1991	Gálvez Circuit No.6	September 15	(Brazil) Marcos Gueiros	Ralt-Honda	Report
1992	(Argentina) Gran Premio Ciudad de Buenos Aires 1992	Gálvez Circuit No.9	July 19	(Argentina) Guillermo Kissling	Ralt-Honda	Report
1992	(Argentina) Gran Premio Ciudad de Buenos Aires - Formula 3000	Gálvez Circuit No.9	December 13	(Italy) Andrea Montermini	Reynard-Cosworth	Report
1993	(Argentina) Gran Premio Ciudad de Buenos Aires 1993	Gálvez Circuit No.9	December 19	(Brazil) Helio Castro Neves	Ralt-Honda	Report
1994	(Argentina) Gran Premio Ciudad de Buenos Aires 1994	Gálvez Circuit No.8	August 21	(Argentina) Omar Martínez	Tom's-Toyota	Report
1994	(Argentina) Gran Premio Ciudad de Buenos Aires 1994	Gálvez Circuit No.9	November 6	(Argentina) Gabriel Furlán	Dallara-Fiat	Report
1995	(Argentina) Gran Premio Ciudad de Buenos Aires 1995	Gálvez Circuit No.6	April 9	(Brazil) Max Wilson	Dallara-Opel	Report
1995	(Argentina) Gran Premio Ciudad de Buenos Aires 1995	Gálvez Circuit No.6	November 18	(Argentina) Gabriel Furlán	Dallara-Fiat	Report
1995	(Argentina) Gran Premio Ciudad de Buenos Aires 1995	Gálvez Circuit No.8	November 19	(Brazil) Max Wilson	Dallara-Opel	Report
1996	(Argentina) Gran Premio Ciudad de Buenos Aires 1996	Gálvez Circuit No.6	May 12	(Argentina) Gabriel Furlán	Dallara-Fiat	Report
1996	(Argentina) Gran Premio Ciudad de Buenos Aires 1996	Gálvez Circuit No.8	November 10	(Argentina) Juan Manuel Silva	Tom's-Toyota	Report
1997	(Argentina) Gran Premio Ciudad de Buenos Aires 1997	Gálvez Circuit No.8	September 14	(Argentina) Gabriel Furlán	Dallara-Mitsubishi	Report
1998	(Argentina) Gran Premio Ciudad de Buenos Aires 1998	Gálvez Circuit No.8	November 8	(Argentina) Martín Basso	Dallara-Mitsubishi	Report
1999	(Argentina) Gran Premio Ciudad de Buenos Aires 1999	Gálvez Circuit No.8	August 29	(Brazil) Eduardo Pamplona	Dallara-Opel	Report
1999	(Argentina) Gran Premio Ciudad de Buenos Aires 1999	Gálvez Circuit No.8	August 30	(Brazil) Rodrigo Sperafico	Dallara F394-Mugen	Report
2001	(Argentina) Gran Premio Ciudad de Buenos Aires 2001	Gálvez Circuit No.8	June 17	(Brazil) Juliano Moro	Dallara F301-Mugen	Report
2006	(Argentina) Gran Premio Ciudad de Buenos Aires 2006	Gálvez Circuit No.7	October 29	(Brazil) Diego Nunes	Dallara-Berta	Report
2006	(Argentina) Gran Premio Ciudad de Buenos Aires 2006	Gálvez Circuit No.7	October 29	(Brazil) Diego Nunes	Dallara-Berta	Report
2006	(Argentina) Gran Premio Ciudad de Buenos Aires 2006	Gálvez Circuit No.7	October 30	(Brazil) Clemente Faria	Dallara-Berta	Report
2008	(Argentina) Gran Premio Ciudad de Buenos Aires 2008	Gálvez Circuit No.9	August 9	(Brazil) Nelson Merlo	Dallara-Berta	Report
2008	(Argentina) Gran Premio Ciudad de Buenos Aires 2008	Gálvez Circuit No.9	August 10	(Brazil) Nelson Merlo	Dallara-Berta	Report
2009	(Argentina) Gran Premio Ciudad de Buenos Aires 2009	Gálvez Circuit No.9	September 12	(Brazil) Leonardo Cordeiro	Dallara-Berta	Report
2009	(Argentina) Gran Premio Ciudad de Buenos Aires 2009	Gálvez Circuit No.9	September 13	(Brazil) Leonardo Cordeiro	Dallara-Berta	Report

Turismo Carretera
Year	Name	Circuit	Date	Winning driver	Winning team	Winning car	Report
2023	(Argentina) Gran Premio de Buenos Aires Shell	Gálvez Circuit No.12	August 20	(Argentina) Valentín Aguirre	JP Carrera	Dodge Cherokee	Report
2024	(Argentina) Gran Premio Buenos Aires Turismo Carretera Shell	Gálvez Circuit No.12	August 18	(Argentina) Juan Martín Trucco	Di Meglio Motorsport	Dodge Challenger SRT Hellcat	Report
