= Nestor García-Veiga =

Argentine racing driver (born 1945)

Nestor García Veiga
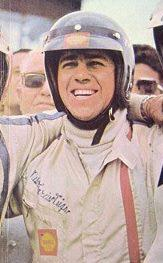
- Nationality: Argentine
- Born: 27 March 1945 (age 81)

24 Hours of Le Mans career
- Years: 1973 -
- Teams: North American Racing Team
- Best finish: 29th (1973)
- Class wins: 0

Formula One World Championship career
- Active years: 1975
- Team: Berta
- Entries: 2 (0 starts)
- Championships: 0
- Wins: 0
- Podiums: 0
- Career points: 0
- Pole positions: 0
- Fastest laps: 0
- First entry: 1975 Argentine Grand Prix
- Last entry: 1975 Brazilian Grand Prix

Néstor Jesús García Veiga (born 27 March 1945) is an Argentine racing driver. He won the Sport Prototipo Argentino championship in 1970 and Fórmula 1 Mecánica Argentina championship in 1973.

== Racing record ==
=== Complete Formula One World Championship results ===
(key)

Year	Entrant	Chassis	Engine	1	2	3	4	5	6	7	8	9	10	11	12	13	14	WDC	Points
1975	Oreste Berta	Berta F1	Cosworth V8	ARG; DNA	BRA; DNA	RSA	ESP	MON	BEL	SWE	NED	FRA	GBR	GER	AUT	ITA	USA	NC	0

=== Non-Championship Formula One results ===
(key)

Year	Entrant	Chassis	Engine	1	2	3	4	5	6	7	8
1971	Luigi Chinetti	Surtees TS5A	Chevrolet V8	ARG; Ret	ROC	QUE	SPR	INT	RIN	OUL	VIC

=== 24 Hours of Le Mans results ===
Year	Team	Co-drivers	Car	Class	Laps	Pos.	Class Pos.
1973	(United States) North American Racing Team	(Argentina) Rubén Luis di Palma	Ferrari 365 GTB/4	GT; 5.0	211	29th	10th

=== Complete WRC results ===
Year	Entrant	Car	1	2	3	4	5	6	7	8	9	10	11	12	WDC	Points
1980	Nestor García-Veiga	Peugeot 504	MON	SWE	POR	KEN	GRC	ARG; 8	FIN	NZL	ITA	FRA	GBR	CIV	51st	3
