= Jesús Iglesias (racing driver) =

Argentine racing driver (1922–2005)

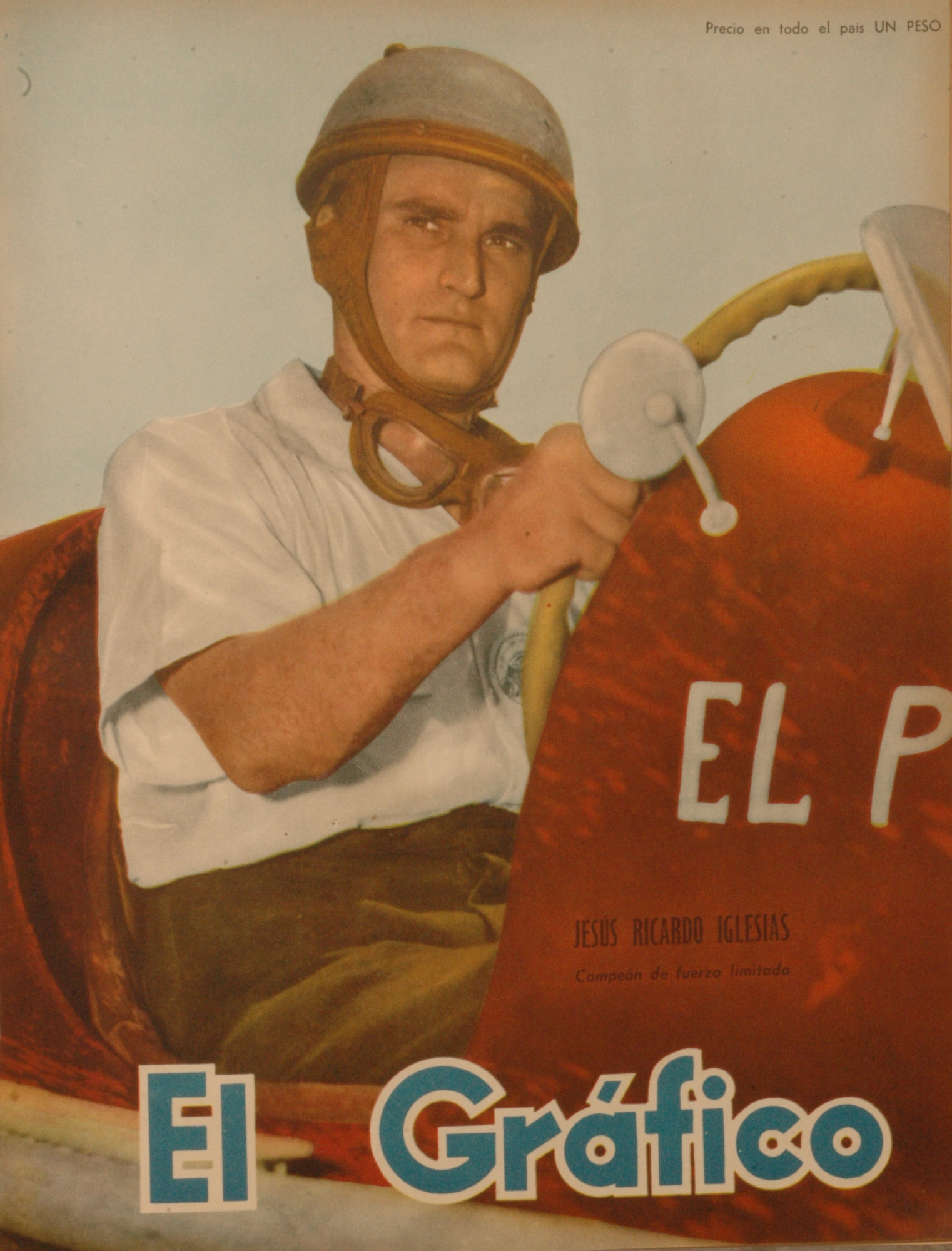
- Born: Jesús Ricardo Iglesias; 22 February 1922; Pergamino, Buenos Aires, Argentina
- Died: 11 July 2005 (aged 83); Pergamino, Buenos Aires, Argentina

Formula One World Championship career
- Nationality: (Argentina) Argentine
- Active years: 1955
- Team: Gordini
- Entries: 1
- Championships: 0
- Wins: 0
- Podiums: 0
- Career points: 0
- Pole positions: 0
- Fastest laps: 0
- First entry: 1955 Argentine Grand Prix

Jesús Ricardo Iglesias (February 22, 1922 – July 11, 2005) was a racing driver from Argentina. He initially competed with some success in long distance races in Argentina with a Chevrolet Special, before being invited to drive one of the works Gordini Type 16s in the 1955 Argentine Grand Prix. He qualified 17th out of 22 competitors, but had to retire on lap 38 due to transmission failure, although he also seemed to be on the brink of exhaustion because of the boiling heat.

After that, Iglesias went back to endurance racing, in which he competed solely in Argentinian races. He had his best result in the Rafaela 500-mile race in 1956, where he took second place in his Chevrolet Special car.

== Complete Formula One World Championship results ==
(key)

Year	Entrant	Chassis	Engine	1	2	3	4	5	6	7	WDC	Points
1955	Equipe Gordini	Gordini Type 16	Gordini Straight-6	ARG; Ret	MON	500	BEL	NED	GBR	ITA	NC	0
