= Luis Rubén di Palma =

Argentine racing driver (1944–2000)

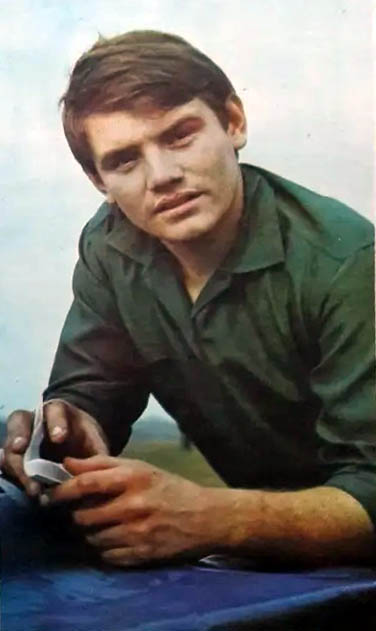
- Di Palma in 1969
- Nationality: Argentine
- Born: 27 October 1944; Arrecifes, Buenos Aires Province, Argentina
- Died: 30 September 2000 (aged 55); Carlos Tejedor, Buenos Aires Province, Argentina

24 Hours of Le Mans career
- Years: 1973 -
- Teams: North American Racing Team
- Best finish: 29th (1973)
- Class wins: 0

Luis Rubén di Palma (October 27, 1944 in Arrecifes – September 30, 2000 in Carlos Tejedor) was an Argentine racing driver. He won the Sport Prototipo Argentino championship in 1971 and 1972, the Turismo Carretera championship 1970 (Formula A) and 1971, the Fórmula 1 Mecánica Argentina championship in 1974 and 1978 and the TC2000 championship in 1983. He died in September 2000, when the Robinson R44 helicopter he was flying spun out of control and crashed near Carlos Tejedor, Buenos Aires Province.

== 24 Hours of Le Mans results ==
Year	Team	Co-drivers	Car	Class	Laps	Pos.	Class Pos.
1973	(United States) North American Racing Team	(Argentina) Nestor García-Veiga	Ferrari 365 GTB/4	GT; 5.0	211	29th	10th

Sporting positions
Preceded by Gastón Perkins	Turismo Carretera champion 1970-1971	Succeeded by Héctor Luis Gradassi
Preceded by Jorge Omar del Río	TC2000 champion 1983	Succeeded by Mario Gayraud
