= Gabriel Werner =

Brazilian footballer

Personal information
- Full name: Gabriel Werner
- Date of birth: 14 July 2003 (age 23)
- Place of birth: Capitão, Brazil
- Height: 1.91 m (6 ft 3 in)
- Position: Goalkeeper

Team information
- Current team: Chapecoense
- Number: 14

Youth career
- Guarani VA
- 2020–2024: Chapecoense

Senior career*
Years	Team	Apps	(Gls)
2023–	Chapecoense	1	(0)
2026	→ Ypiranga-RS (loan)	15	(0)
- * Club domestic league appearances and goals as of 21:16, 18 November 2026 (UTC)

Gabriel Werner (born 14 July 2003) is a Brazilian footballer who plays as a goalkeeper for Chapecoense.

== Career ==
Born in Capitão, Rio Grande do Sul, Werner joined Chapecoense's youth sides in 2020, from Guarani de Venâncio Aires. He was promoted to the first team in December 2022, but was never higher than a fourth-choice in the following years.

On 3 December 2025, Werner was loaned to Série C side Ypiranga-RS for the season. Back to Chape in August 2026 after being regularly used, he renewed his contract with the club until 2027 afterwards.

After profitting from Rafael Santos' departure, Werner made his Série A debut on 14 November 2026, starting in a 2–0 home loss to Vasco da Gama, as Chapecoense was already relegated.

== Career statistics ==
As of 18 November 2026

Club	Season	League			State League		Cup		Continental		Other		Total	
Club	Season	Division	Apps	Goals	Apps	Goals	Apps	Goals	Apps	Goals	Apps	Goals	Apps	Goals
Chapecoense	2023	Série B	—		—		—		—		4 (Note: Appearance(s) in Copa Santa Catarina)	0	4	0
Chapecoense	2024	Série B	0	0	—		—		—		9	0	9	0
Chapecoense	2025	Série B	0	0	—		—		—		8	0	8	0
Chapecoense	2026	Série A	1	0	—		—		—		—		1	0
Chapecoense	Total		1	0	—		—		—		21	0	22	0
Ypiranga-RS (loan)	2026	Série C	14	0	1	0	2	0	—		—		17	0
Career total			15	0	1	0	2	0	0	0	21	0	39	0
