= Carlos Arzani =

Argentine racing driver (1909–1952)

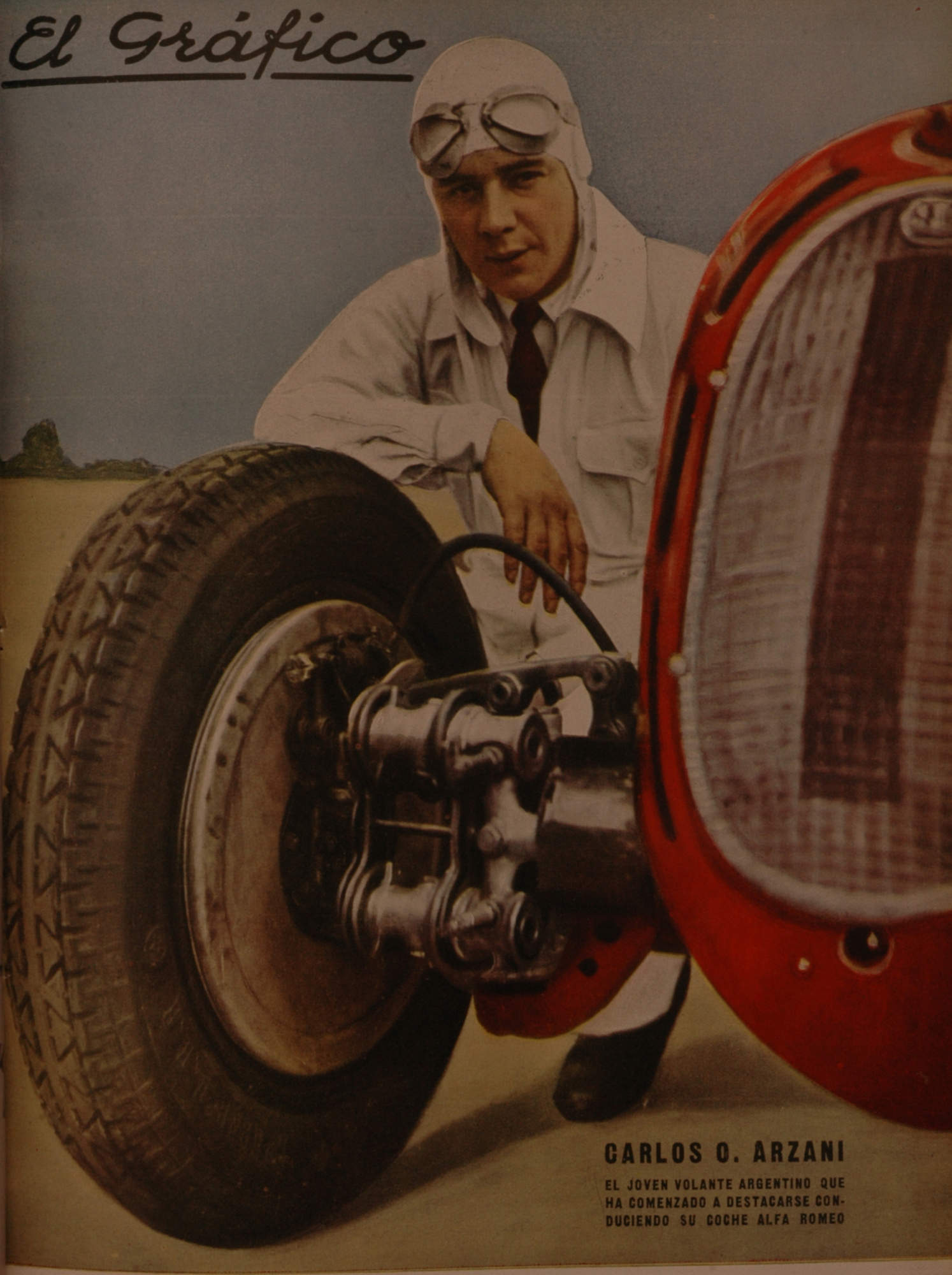
- Carlos Arzani in November 1936

Carlos Arzani (27 November 1909 – 30 January 1952) was an Argentine driver, born in Buenos Aires, who raced private Alfa Romeos, mostly in South America. In 1937, he bought an Alfa Romeo 8C 35 and raced it at Naples before taking the car back to Argentine.

== Major career wins ==
- 1936 Buenos Aires Grand Prix
- 1939 Argentine Circuit Championship (Spanish: Campeonato Argentino de Pista)
