= Eduardo Casa =

Argentine racing driver

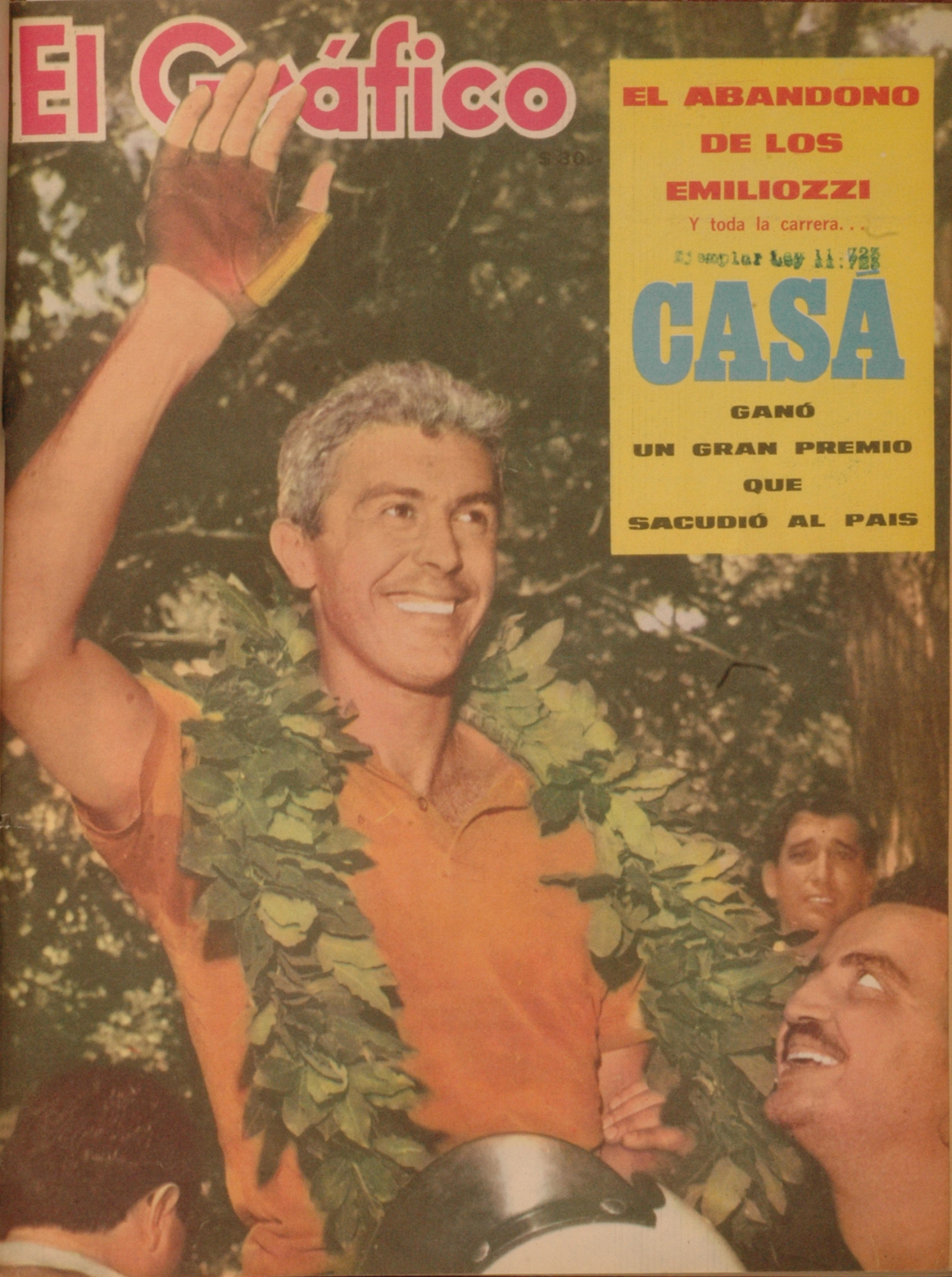
- Eduardo Casá in 1965
- Born: 17 February 1937
- Died: 24 January 2004 (aged 66); Buenos Aires
- Occupation: racecar driver

Eduardo Casá (17 February 1917 – 24 January 2004, Buenos Aires) was an Argentine racecar driver.

Auto Race Car Driver. Nicknamed "Tuqui," he was one of the most popular drivers of the Turismo Carretera category during the 1960s, specially for his Ford called by his fans "El Tractor." He won 10 races, and is best remembered for his triumph in the 1965 GP and his 1966 Vice-Championship.

He was buried in La Recoleta Cemetery in Buenos Aires.
