= March 782 =

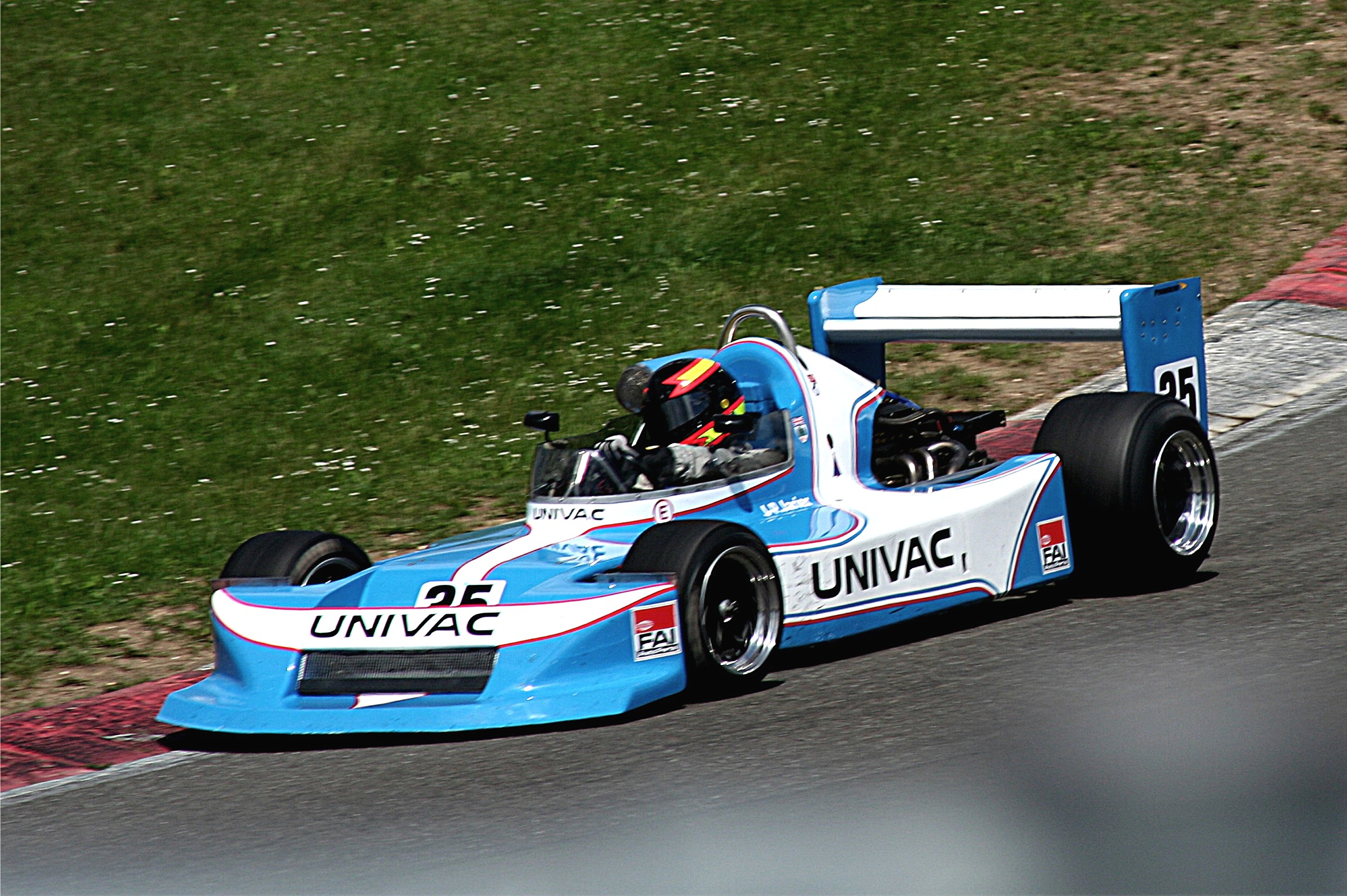
- Category: Formula 2
- Constructor: March

Technical specifications
- Chassis: Aluminum monocoque with rear sub-frame covered in fiberglass body
- Suspension (front): Double wishbones, Coil springs over Dampers, Anti-roll bar
- Suspension (rear): Twin lower links, Single top links, twin trailing arms, Coil springs over Dampers, Anti-roll bar
- Axle track: 1,320 mm (52 in) (front); 1,300 mm (51 in) (rear)
- Wheelbase: 2,500 mm (98 in)
- Engine: BMW M12/7, mid-engined, longitudinally mounted, 2.0 L (122.0 cu in), I4, NA
- Transmission: Hewland F.T.200 5-speed manual
- Power: 307 hp (229 kW)
- Weight: 502–510 kg (1,107–1,124 lb)
- Tyres: Goodyear

Competition history
- Debut: 1978

The March 782 was an open-wheel Formula 2 car, designed, developed and built by British manufacturer March Engineering in 1978. The 782 chassis was very competitive, and March dominated the season with their 782 chassis, and it was a clean-sweep; winning 11 out of the 12 races, and Bruno Giacomelli winning the championship, with 78 points (dropped from 82 points). Marc Surer finished second-place in the championship as runner-up, with 48 points (dropped from 51 points); also driving a 782 chassis. It saw continued used until the end of 1981, with Alberto Colombo winning at Hockenheim in 1980 with a two-year-old 782 chassis.
