= Eduardo Copello =

Argentine racing driver

Eduardo José Copello (February 13, 1926 in San Juan Province – February 27, 2000) was an Argentine racing driver. He won the Turismo Carretera championship in 1967 and the Sport Prototipo Argentino championship in 1969.

Sporting positions
Preceded by Juan Manuel Bordeu	Turismo Carretera champion 1967	Succeeded by Carlos Pairetti
