= Carlos Pairetti =

Argentine racing driver (1935–2022)

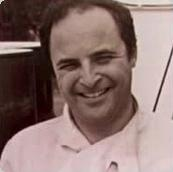
Pairetti in 1968

Carlos Alberto Pairetti (17 October 1935 – 26 September 2022) was an Argentine racing driver.

Pairetti was born in Clucellas, Santa Fe on 17 October 1935. He won the Turismo Carretera championship in 1968.

Sporting positions
Preceded by Eduardo Copello	Turismo Carretera champion 1968	Succeeded by Gastón Perkins
