= Clemar Bucci =

Argentine racing driver (1920–2011)

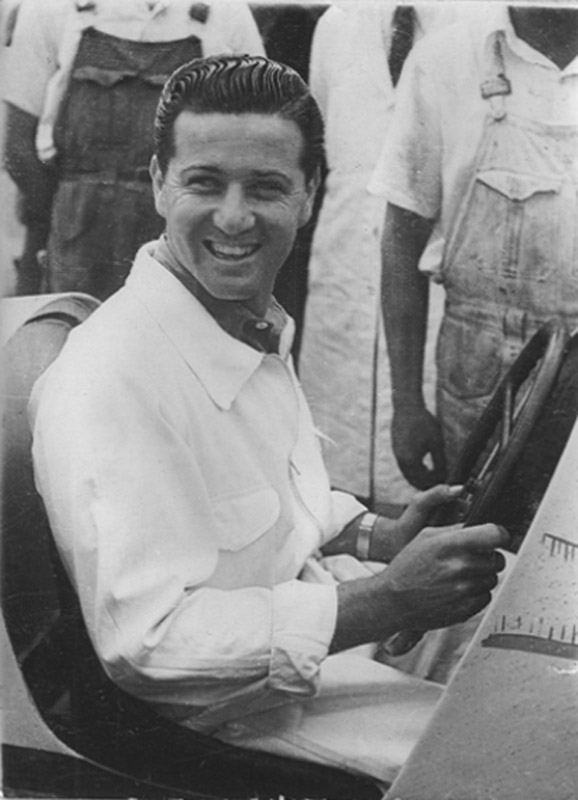
- Born: 4 September 1920; Zenón Pereyra, Santa Fe, Argentina
- Died: 12 January 2011 (aged 90); Buenos Aires, Argentina

Formula One World Championship career
- Nationality: (Argentina) Argentine
- Active years: 1954–1955
- Team(s): Gordini and Maserati
- Entries: 5
- Championships: 0
- Wins: 0
- Podiums: 0
- Career points: 0
- Pole positions: 0
- Fastest laps: 0
- First entry: 1954 British Grand Prix
- Last entry: 1955 Argentine Grand Prix

Clemar Bucci (4 September 1920 – 12 January 2011) was an Argentine racing driver. He participated in five World Championship Formula One Grands Prix, debuting on 17 July 1954 and several non-Championship Formula One races. He scored no championship points. He was born in Zenón Pereyra and died in Buenos Aires.

Bucci was also a car designer; he designed a prototype of a grand tourer called Dogo SS-2000.

== Complete Formula One World Championship results ==
(key)

Year	Entrant	Chassis	Engine	1	2	3	4	5	6	7	8	9	WDC	Points
1954	Equipe Gordini	Gordini Type 16	Gordini Straight-6	ARG	500	BEL	FRA	GBR; Ret	GER; Ret	SUI; Ret	ITA; Ret	ESP	NC	0
1955	Officine Alfieri Maserati	Maserati 250F	Maserati Straight-6	ARG; Ret *	MON	500	BEL	NED	GBR	ITA			NC	0

* Indicates shared drive with Harry Schell and Carlos Menditeguy
