= Autódromo Oscar y Juan Gálvez =

Race track in Buenos Aires, Argentina

Autódromo de Buenos Aires Oscar y Juan Gálvez
Autódromo
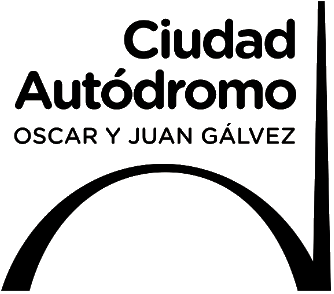
- Circuit logo

- Details of all its circuit layouts
- Location: Buenos Aires, Argentina
- Coordinates: 34°41′39.38″S 58°27′33.65″W
- Capacity: 45,000
- FIA Grade: 4 (No. 6)
- Operator: Secretaría de Deportes of GCBA
- Opened: 9 March 1952; 74 years ago
- Former names: List: Autódromo Oscar Alfredo Gálvez (1989–2008); Autódromo Municipal del Parque Almirante Brown de la Ciudad de Buenos Aires (1960s–1989); Autódromo Municipal Ciudad de Buenos Aires (1955–1960s); Autódromo 17 de Octubre (1952–1955)
- Major events: Future: Grand Prix motorcycle racing Argentine motorcycle Grand Prix (1961–1963, 1981–1982, 1987, 1994–1995, 1998–1999, 2027); Former: Formula One; Argentine Grand Prix (1953–1958, 1960, 1972–1975, 1977–1981, 1995–1998); TCR South America (2021–2022, 2024); Stock Car Pro Series (2005–2007, 2017, 2023–2024); TC2000 (1979–2010, 2014, 2016–2025); Turismo Carretera (1952–1955, 1958–1970, 1974–1979, 1981–2014, 2017–2018, 2020–2021, 2023–2025); Turismo Nacional (1963–1997, 2000–2003, 2017, 2021–2025); Top Race V6 (1997–2000, 2002–2003, 2007–2011, 2017, 2020–2025); World Sportscar Championship (1954–1958, 1960, 1971–1972); Buenos Aires Grand Prix (1952–1955, 1957–1959, 1964, 1966–1968, 1978, 1983, 1985, 1987, 1989–1999, 2001, 2006, 2008–2009)
- Website: ciudadautodromo.com

No. 6 circuit with Senna S (1995–present)
- Length: 4.259 km (2.646 mi)
- Turns: 19
- Race lap record: 1:27.981 ( (Austria) Gerhard Berger, Benetton B197, 1997, F1)

No. 6 circuit (1972–present)
- Length: 4.101 km (2.548 mi)
- Turns: 16
- Race lap record: 1:40.006 ( (Argentina) Gino Trappa, Tatuus F4-T421, 2024, F4)

No. 15 circuit (1972–present)
- Length: 5.968 km (3.708 mi)
- Turns: 16
- Race lap record: 1:45.287 ( (Brazil) Nelson Piquet, Brabham BT49C, 1981, F1)

No. 12 circuit (1972–present)
- Length: 5.651 km (3.511 mi)
- Turns: 8
- Race lap record: 1:30.127 ( (Argentina) Juan Martín Trucco, Dodge Challenger SRT Hellcat, 2024, TC)

No. 9 circuit (1972–present)
- Length: 3.353 km (2.083 mi)
- Turns: 14
- Race lap record: 1:09.300 ( (Italy) Andrea Montermini, Reynard 91D, 1992, F3000)

No. 8 circuit (1972–present)
- Length: 3.380 km (2.100 mi)
- Turns: 9
- Race lap record: 1:13.279 ( (Brazil) Juliano Moro, Dallara F301, 2001, F3)

No. 5 circuit (1972–present)
- Length: 2.115 km (1.314 mi)
- Turns: 8
- Race lap record: 0:54.637 ( (Argentina) Javier Balzano, Chevrolet Vectra 16v, 1997, Super Touring)

No. 7 circuit (1972–present)
- Length: 2.607 km (1.620 mi)
- Turns: 4
- Race lap record: 0:46.114 ( (Brazil) Diego Nunes, Dallara F301, 2006, F3)

No. 14 circuit (1968–1971)
- Length: 6.122 km (3.804 mi)
- Turns: 13
- Race lap record: 1:50.230 ( (United Kingdom) Chris Craft, McLaren M8C, 1971, Group 7)

No. 2 circuit (1952–1971)
- Length: 3.912 km (2.431 mi)
- Turns: 13
- Race lap record: 1:36.100 ( (United Kingdom) Stirling Moss, Cooper T51, 1960, F1)

No. 4 circuit (1952–1971)
- Length: 4.706 km (2.924 mi)
- Turns: 16
- Race lap record: 1:49.300 ( (Italy) Ernesto Brambilla, Ferrari Dino 166 F2, 1968, F3)

The Autódromo de Buenos Aires Oscar y Juan Gálvez is a 45,000 capacity motor racing circuit in Buenos Aires, Argentina built in 1952 under president Juan Perón, named Autódromo 17 de Octubre after the date of Loyalty Day until Perón's overthrow. It was later renamed after Argentinian racing driver brothers, Juan Gálvez (1916–1963) and Oscar Alfredo Gálvez (1913–1989).

== Description ==
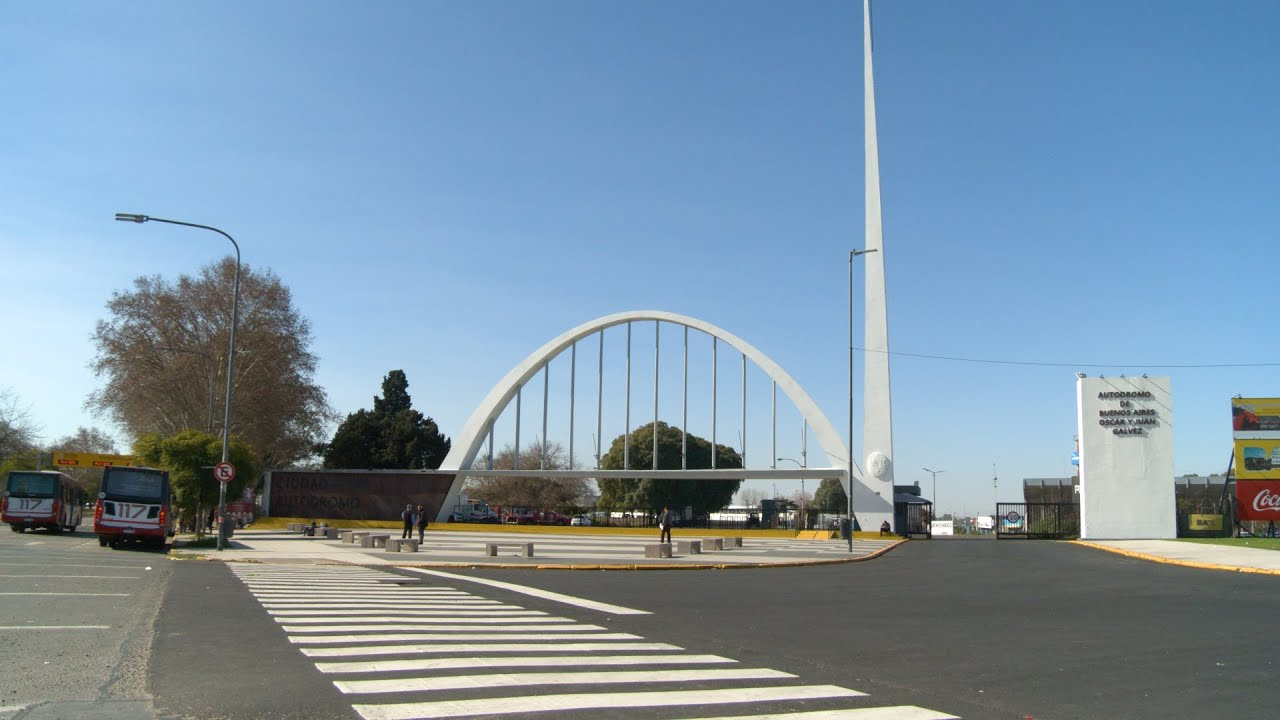
Main entrance to Autódromo Oscar y Juan Gálvez

The circuit was originally constructed on swampland in Villa Riachuelo, the southernmost barrio of Buenos Aires, and is situated on flat lands surrounded by large grandstands, giving most spectators an excellent view area of the whole circuit. The circuit is notable for the large number of alternative layouts to accommodate different forms of racing, with some races run without the twisty infield section, reducing lap times significantly.

The 1000 km Buenos Aires sports car event used the Autódromo as well as sections of highway situated near the track from 1954 to 1960. The 1000 km event would return again from 1970 to 1972, but using just the Autódromo section.

The 20 Formula One Argentine Grand Prix races were held in the Autódromo between 1953 and 1998. Formula One used a number of different configurations—the No.2 circuit was used from 1954–1960, the No.9 circuit was used from 1971–1973, and the very fast No.15 layout was used from 1974–1981 which added 2 long straights and a long third corner between the two straights often taken in top gear flat out, which provided an exciting view for spectators, especially when the cars exited the third corner often on the brink of spinning off or crashing at 305 km/h (190 mph). Going through the section, the cars were flat out for 40 seconds. The Argentine Grand Prix was dropped from the 1982 calendar because of Argentina's invasion of the Falkland Islands and Carlos Reutemann's sudden retirement after the 1982 Brazilian Grand Prix. The twisty No.6 configuration, though using S de Senna instead of Tobogán, was used from 1995–1998, but that version of the circuit was not popular with Formula One. After the 1998 race, there was no money for the race to be held and it was dropped.

Ten Argentine motorcycle Grand Prix races were held in the Autódromo between 1961 and 1999 and will return in 2027 with a major redevelopment programme to bring the track to FIA Grade 2 (Then Grade 1) to host MotoGP.

The Buenos Aires Grand Prix was held in the Autódromo from 1952 to 2009.

== Names ==
- 1952–1955: Autódromo 17 de Octubre
- 1955 – mid-1960s: Autódromo Municipal Ciudad de Buenos Aires
- Mid-1960s – 1989: Autódromo Municipal del Parque Almirante Brown de la Ciudad de Buenos Aires
- 1989–2008: Autódromo Oscar Alfredo Gálvez
- 2008–present: Autódromo Oscar y Juan Gálvez

== Circuits ==
Main track with as used for F1 between 1995 and 1998

Entire track including the lake extension, as used for F1 from 1974 to 1981

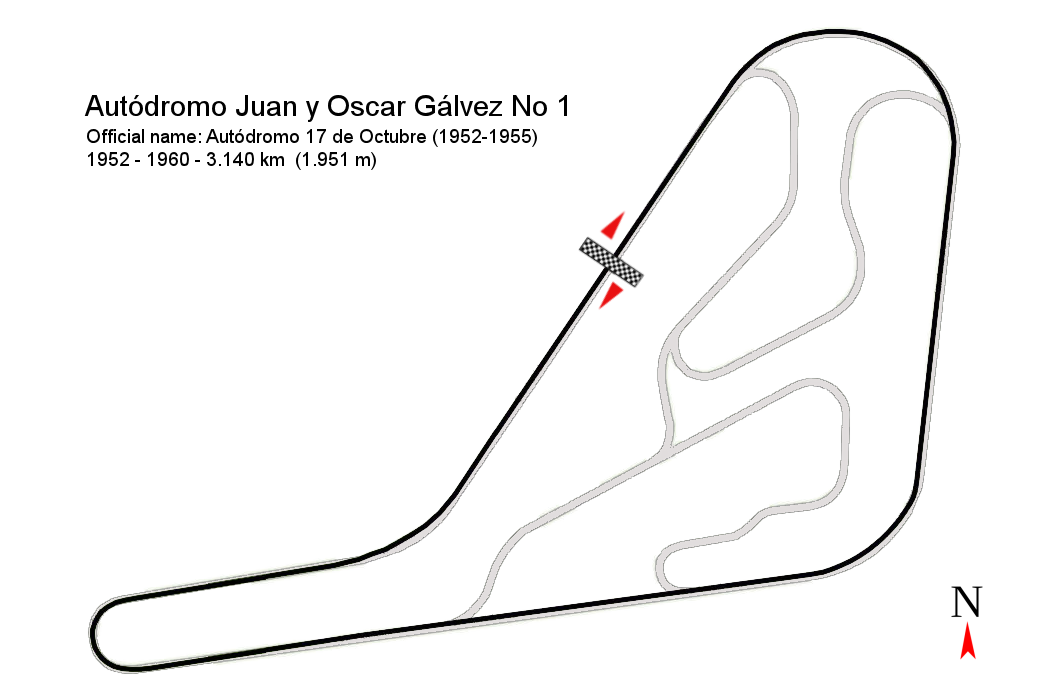
Circuit N° 1 (1952–1971)

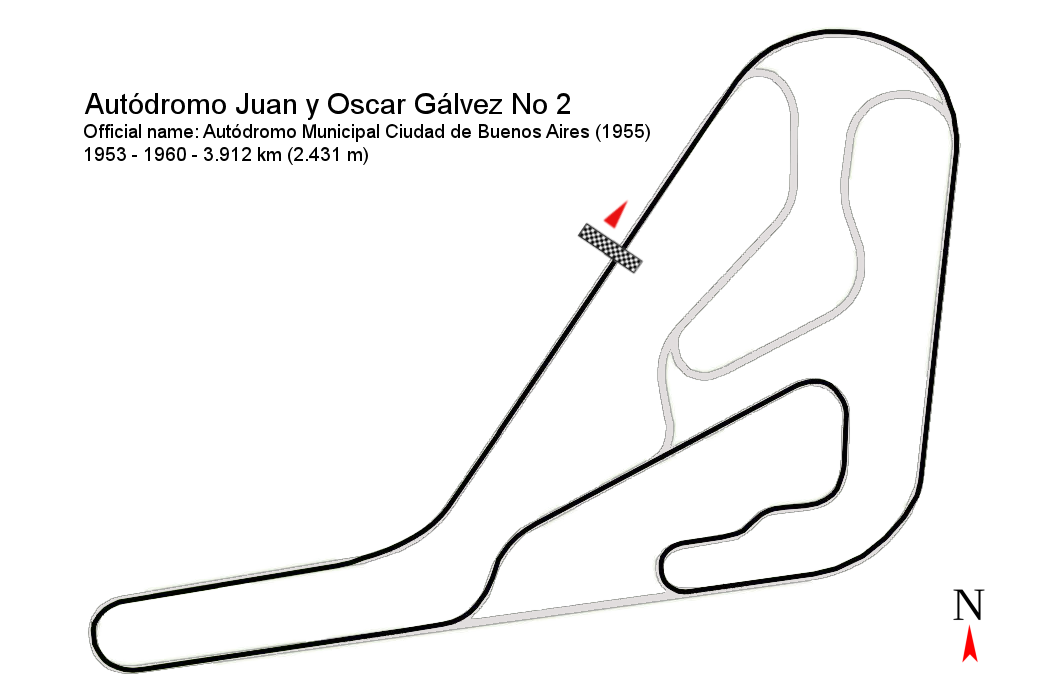
Circuit N° 2 (1952–1971)

Reverse version of Circuit N° 2, used for 1954 Argentine Grand Prix

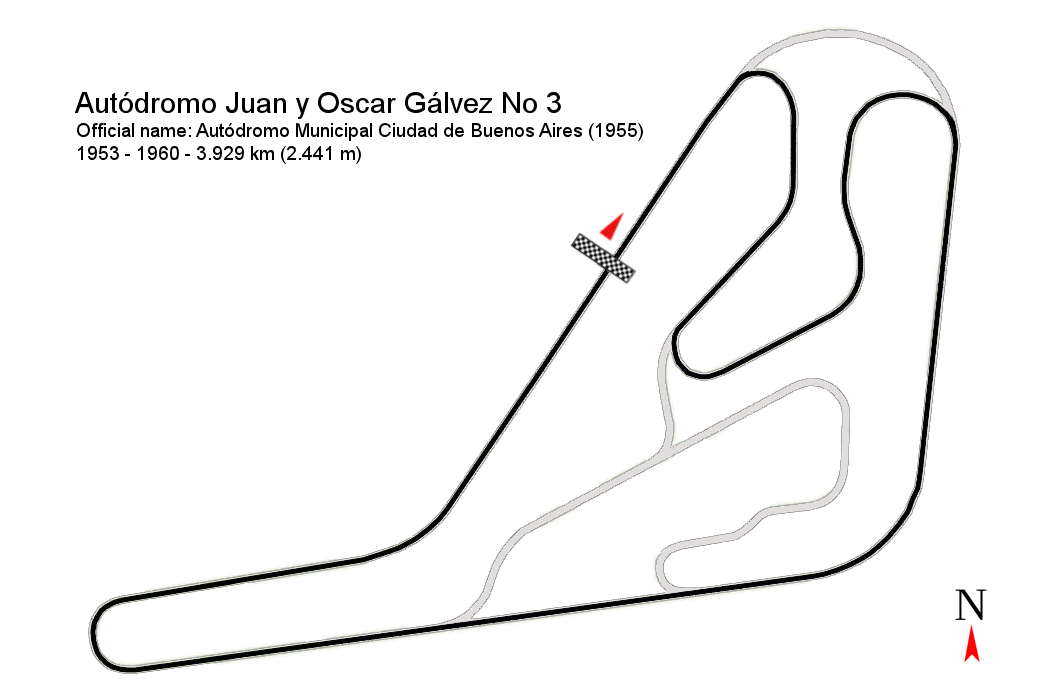
Circuit N° 3 (1952–1971)

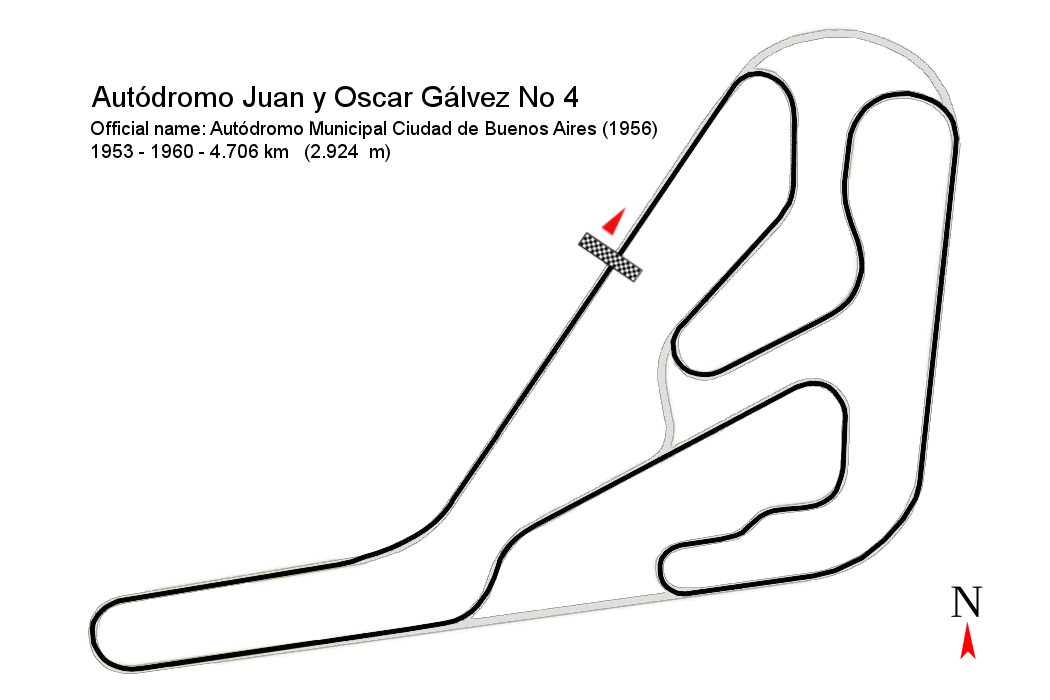
Circuit N° 4 (1952–1971)

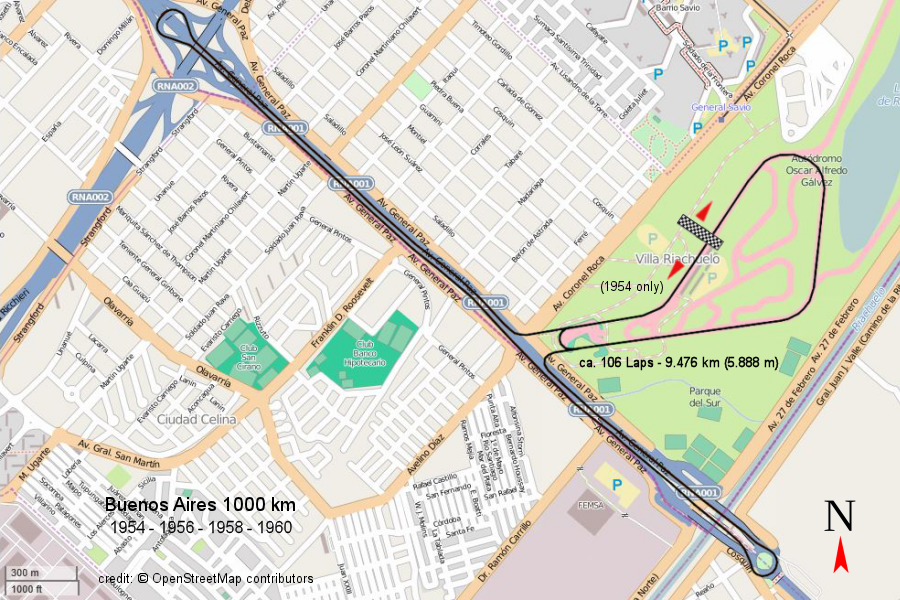
Buenos Aires 1000 km Circuit (1954, 1956, 1958, 1960)

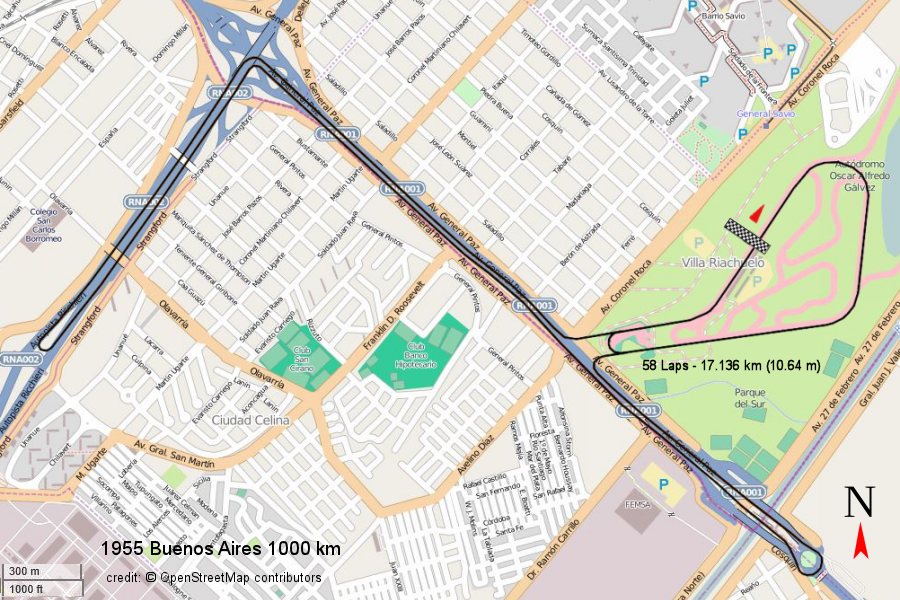
Buenos Aires 1000 km Circuit (1955)

Circuit N° 5 (1972–present)

Circuit N° 6 (1972–present)

Circuit N° 6 with Senna S used for Formula One 1995–1998 (1995–present)

Circuit N° 6 in the version used for motorcycle racing 1987, 1994–1995, 1998–1999

Circuit N° 7 (1972–present)

Circuit N° 8 (1972–present)

Circuit N° 9 (1972–present)

Circuit N° 9 with Senna S (1995–present)

Circuit N° 12 (1972–present)

Circuit N° 14 (1968–1971)

Circuit N° 15 (1972–present)

Circuit N° 15 with Senna S (1995–present)

Layout usage

- 1952–1958: Buenos Aires Grand Prix (La Temporada) – Formula Libre (Circuits: No.4 for 1952, No.2 for 1953–1958)
- 1953–1998: Argentine Grand Prix – Formula 1 (Circuits: No.2 for 1953–1960, No.9 for 1971–1973, No.15 for 1974–1981, No.6 with Senna S for 1995–1998)
- 1964–1978: Buenos Aires Grand Prix – Formula 2, Formula 3, Formula Junior (Circuits: No.4 for 1964, No.15 for 1966–1968, No.12 for 1978)
- 1983–1985: Buenos Aires Grand Prix – Formula 2 Codasur (Circuit No.4)
- 1954–1960 / 1970–1972: 1000 km of Buenos Aires sports car series Grand Prix (No.1 plus various street layouts for 1954, 1956, 1958, 1960, No. 1 with longer section of Autopista General Pablo Riccheri for 1955, No.14 for 1970–1971, No.15 for 1972)
- 1961–1999: Argentine motorcycle Grand Prix (Circuits: No.2 for 1961 and 1963, No.1 for 1962, No.8 for 1982 and 1987, No.6 for 1981, 1994–1995 and 1998–1999)
- 2017–2018: 1000 km of Buenos Aires Turismo Carretera Grand Prix (Circuit No.12)

== Events ==
Future

- Grand Prix motorcycle racing
  - Argentine motorcycle Grand Prix (1961–1963, 1981–1982, 1987, 1994–1995, 1998–1999, 2027)

Former

- 200 Miles of Buenos Aires (1970)
- Buenos Aires Grand Prix (1952–1955, 1957–1959, 1964, 1966–1968, 1978, 1983, 1985, 1987, 1989–1999, 2001, 2006, 2008–2009)
- Campeonato Sudamericano de GT (2013)
- Copa Truck (2018)
- F4 Argentina Championship (2021)
- F4 Brazilian Championship (2024)
- Formula 2 Argentina (2024)
- Formula 3 Sudamericana
  - Buenos Aires Grand Prix (1987, 1989–1999, 2001, 2006, 2008–2009)
- Fórmula Nacional Argentina (1980–2010, 2014, 2016–2025)
- Formula One
  - Argentine Grand Prix (1953–1958, 1960, 1972–1975, 1977–1981, 1995–1998)
- Formula Truck (2009–2011)
- Porsche Cup Brasil (2011, 2017)
- Porsche GT3 Cup Trophy Argentina (2018–2019)
- Sport Prototipo Argentino (1969-1973)
- Sport Prototipo Argentino (2023-) (2023)
- South American Super Touring Car Championship (1997–2001)
- Stock Car Pro Series (2005–2007, 2017, 2023–2024)
- TC2000 Championship (1979–2010, 2014, 2016–2025)
- TC2000 Championship
  - 200 km de Buenos Aires (2004–2010, 2014, 2016–2019, 2021–2025)
- Top Race V6 (1997–2000, 2002–2003, 2007–2011, 2017, 2020–2025)
- Turismo Carretera (1952–1955, 1958–1970, 1974–1979, 1981–2014, 2017–2018, 2020–2021, 2023–2025)
- Turismo Carretera 2000 (2025)
- Turismo Carretera Pista (1995–2014, 2017–2018, 2020–2021, 2023–2025)
- Turismo Nacional (1963–1997, 2000–2003, 2017, 2021–2025)
- TCR Brazil Touring Car Championship (2024)
- TCR South America Touring Car Championship (2021–2022, 2024)
- World Sportscar Championship
  - 1000 km Buenos Aires (1954–1958, 1960, 1971–1972)

== Lap records ==
As of August 2025, the fastest official race lap records at the Autódromo Oscar y Juan Gálvez are listed as:

Category	Time	Driver	Vehicle	Event
No.6 Circuit with Senna "S" (1995–2026): 4.259 km (2.646 mi)
Formula One	1:27.981	Gerhard Berger	Benetton B197	1997 Argentine Grand Prix
Porsche Carrera Cup	1:53.636	Ricardo Rosset	Porsche 911 (997 II) GT3 Cup	2011 Buenos Aires Porsche Cup Brasil round
No.6 Circuit (1972–present): 4.101 km (2.548 mi)
Formula 4	1:40.006	Gino Trappa	Tatuus F4-T421	2024 Buenos Aires F4 Brazil round
500cc	1:44.122	Tadayuki Okada	Honda NSR500	1998 Argentine motorcycle Grand Prix
250cc	1:45.473	Valentino Rossi	Aprilia RS250	1998 Argentine motorcycle Grand Prix
125cc	1:49.917	Masao Azuma	Honda RS125R	1998 Argentine motorcycle Grand Prix
Formula Renault 2.0	1:50.349	Jorge Barrio	Tito F4-A Renault	2021 2nd Buenos Aires Formula Renault Argentina round
Súper TC2000	1:50.438	Rubens Barrichello	Toyota Corolla Mk.12	2020 3rd Buenos Aires Súper TC2000 round
No.8 Circuit (1972–2026): 3.380 km (2.100 mi)
Formula Three	1:13.279	Juliano Moro	Dallara F301	2001 Buenos Aires Grand Prix
Stock Car Pro Series	1:17.657	Gabriel Casagrande	Chevrolet Cruze Stock Car	2023 Buenos Aires Stock Car Pro Series round
TC2000	1:18.970	Matías Rossi	Toyota Corolla Cross	2025 Buenos Aires TC2000 round
TCR Touring Car	1:21.345	Jorge Barrio	Toyota GR Corolla Sport TCR	2022 Buenos Aires TCR South America round
Formula Renault 2.0	1:21.355	Emiliano Stang	Tito F4-A Renault	2023 2nd Buenos Aires Fórmula Nacional Argentina round
Formula 4	1:21.372	Federico Hermida	Mygale M14-F4	2021 2nd Buenos Aires F4 Argentina round
Super Touring	1:24.442	Oscar Larrauri	Alfa Romeo 156 TS	2000 2nd Buenos Aires SASTC round
500cc	1:33.140	Kenny Roberts	Yamaha YZR500	1982 Argentine motorcycle Grand Prix
Truck racing	1:39.515	Beto Monteiro	Iveco Truck	2018 Buenos Aires Copa Truck round
125cc	1:43.190	Ricardo Tormo	Sanvenero 125	1982 Argentine motorcycle Grand Prix
No.15 Circuit (1972–2026): 5.968 km (3.708 mi)
Formula One	1:45.287	Nelson Piquet	Brabham BT49C	1981 Argentine Grand Prix
Group 6	1:58.390	Reine Wisell	Lola T280	1972 1000 km Buenos Aires
Súper TC2000	2:09.572	Juan Ángel Rosso	Ford Focus	2017 Buenos Aires 200km
No.12 Circuit (1972–present): 5.651 km (3.511 mi)
Turismo Carretera	1:30.127	Juan Martín Trucco	Dodge Challenger SRT Hellcat	2024 Buenos Aires Grand Prix
Porsche Carrera Cup	1:37.879	Juan Lorio	Porsche 911 (997 I) GT3 Cup	2018 1st Buenos Aires Porsche GT3 Cup Trophy Argentina round
TC2000	1:38.915	Mariano Werner	Toyota Corolla Mk.10	2010 Buenos Aires 200km
Turismo Nacional Clase 2	1:47.486	Juan Manuel Damiani	Toyota Etios	2023 Buenos Aires Turismo Nacional round
Turismo Nacional Clase 3	1:56.048	José Manuel Urcera	Ford Focus III	2023 Buenos Aires Turismo Nacional round
No.9 Circuit (1972–2026): 3.353 km (2.083 mi)
Formula 3000	1:09.300	Andrea Montermini	Reynard 91D	1992 Buenos Aires Grand Prix – World Cup Formula 3000
Formula Three	1:10.816	Nelson Merlo	Dallara F301	2008 Buenos Aires Grand Prix
Formula One	1:11.220	Emerson Fittipaldi	Lotus 72D	1973 Argentine Grand Prix
Formula Two	1:11.800	Clay Regazzoni	Chevron B40	1978 Buenos Aires Grand Prix
Stock Car Pro Series	1:15.753	Rafael Suzuki	Chevrolet Cruze Stock Car	2024 Buenos Aires Stock Car Pro Series round
Súper TC2000	1:18.239	Damián Fineschi	Chevrolet Cruze Mk.2	2024 200 km de Buenos Aires
TCR Touring Car	1:18.962	Matias Cravero	Honda Civic Type R TCR (FK7)	2024 Buenos Aires TCR South America round
Formula Renault 2.0	1:20.257	Jorge Barrio	Tito F4-A Renault	2021 3rd Buenos Aires Formula Renault Argentina round
Porsche Carrera Cup	1:20.695	Pablo Otero	Porsche 911 (991 I) GT3 Cup	2019 3rd Buenos Aires Porsche GT3 Cup Trophy Argentina round
Super Touring	1:33.786	Ricardo Risatti	Ford Mondeo Ghia	1997 4th Buenos Aires SASTC round
No.5 Circuit (1972–2026): 2.215 km (1.376 mi)
Super Touring	0:54.637	Javier Balzano	Chevrolet Vectra 16v	1997 2nd Buenos Aires SASTC round
No.7 Circuit (1972–2026): 2.607 km (1.620 mi)
Formula Three	0:46.114	Diego Nunes	Dallara F301	2006 Buenos Aires Grand Prix
Stock Car Brasil	0.51.712	Ruben Fontes	Chevrolet Astra	2005 Buenos Aires Stock Car Brasil round
Súper TC2000	0:52.243	Julián Santero	Toyota Corolla Mk.12	2020 4th Buenos Aires Súper TC2000 round
Formula Renault 2.0	0:52.306	Valentín Jara	Tito F4-A	2025 Buenos Aires Fórmula 2 Argentina round
No.14 Circuit (1968–1971): 6.122 km (3.804 mi)
Group 7	1:50.230	Chris Craft	McLaren M8C	1971 1000 km Buenos Aires
Group 5	1:51.080	Gérard Larrousse	Porsche 917K	1971 1000 km Buenos Aires
No.2 Circuit (1952–1971): 3.912 km (2.431 mi)
Formula One	1:36.100	Stirling Moss	Cooper T51	1960 Argentine Grand Prix
Formula Three	1:38.700	Jean-Pierre Beltoise	Matra MS5	1967 Buenos Aires Grand Prix
Formula Junior	1:43.100	Alberico Passadore	Lotus 27	1964 Buenos Aires Grand Prix
500cc	1:47.000	Mike Hailwood	MV Agusta 500	1963 Argentine motorcycle Grand Prix
Formula Two	1:48.400	Alberto Ascari	Ferrari Tipo 500	1953 Argentine Grand Prix
250cc	1:48.600	Tom Phillis	Honda RC162	1961 Argentine motorcycle Grand Prix
Sports car racing	1:59.300	José M. Collazo	Ferrari 225 S Berlinetta	1953 Buenos Aires National race
No.1 Circuit (1952–1971): 2.620 km (1.628 mi)
500cc	1:17.700	Benedicto Caldarella	Matchless G50	1962 Argentine motorcycle Grand Prix
No.10 Circuit (1952–1971): 3.140 km (1.951 mi)
125cc	1:22.100	Tom Phillis	Honda 2RC143	1961 Argentine motorcycle Grand Prix
No.4 Circuit (1952–1971): 4.706 km (2.924 mi)
Formula Two	1:49.300	Ernesto Brambilla	Ferrari Dino 166 F2	1968 Gran Premio Argentine Airlines
Formula Junior	2:16.100	Silvio Moser	Brabham BT6	1964 Gran Premio Internacional ACA
Formula One	2:19.500	Stirling Moss (Note: Both drivers took the same lap time in this race independently.); Giuseppe Farina	Mercedes-Benz W196; Ferrari 625 F1	1955 Buenos Aires Grand Prix
Buenos Aires 1000 km Circuit (1955): 17.136 km (10.648 mi)
Sports car racing	6:06.100	José Froilán González	Ferrari 118 LM	1955 1000 km Buenos Aires
Turismo Carretera	7:16.600	Pablo Birger	Ford V-8	1955 1000 km Buenos Aires
Buenos Aires 1000 km Circuit (1954, 1956, 1958, 1960): 9.476 km (5.888 mi)
Sports car racing	3:22.400	Richie Ginther	Ferrari 250 TR 59/60 Fantuzzi Spyder	1960 1000 km Buenos Aires

== Concerts ==
The 2007, 2008, 2010 and 2011 Creamfields editions were held in the track, The Chemical Brothers, Carl Cox, John Digweed, LCD Soundsystem, James Zabiela, 2 Many DJs, Tiefschwarz, Steve Lawler, Satoshi Tomiie, Booka Shade, Deadmau5, David Guetta, Calvin Harris, among others playing here.
