= Matra-Simca MS660 =

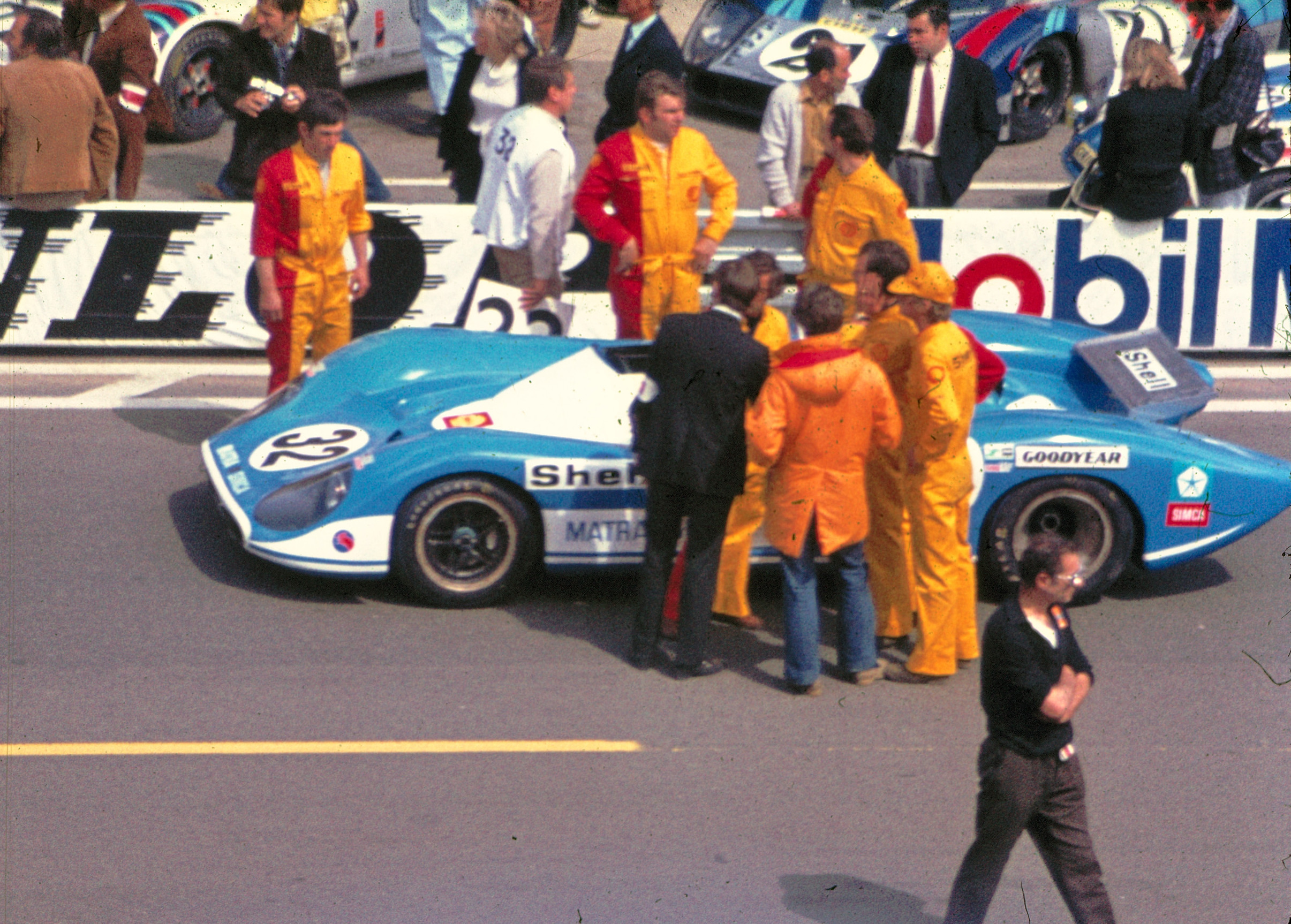
- Category: Group 6 Prototype
- Constructor: Matra
- Designer(s): Bernard Boyer
- Predecessor: MS650
- Successor: MS670

Technical specifications
- Chassis: Glass-fibre reinforced plastic panels
- Suspension (front): Double wishbones, coil springs over dampers
- Suspension (rear): Double wishbones, coil springs over dampers
- Length: 3,900 mm (153.5 in)
- Width: 1,900 mm (74.8 in)
- Height: 760 mm (29.9 in)
- Axle track: Front: 1,500 mm (59.1 in); Rear: 1,500 mm (59.1 in)
- Wheelbase: 2,600 mm (102.4 in)
- Engine: Matra MS12, 2,993 cc (182.6 cu in), 60º V12, NA, Longitudinal, mid-mounted
- Transmission: Matra 5-speed manual
- Weight: 700 kg (1,543.2 lb)
- Fuel: Lucas

Competition history
- Notable entrants: Equipe Matra Elf; Matra Sports; Equipe Matra-Simca
- Notable drivers: (France) Jean-Pierre Beltoise (France) Henri Pescarolo (France) Jean-Pierre Jabouille (New Zealand) Chris Amon (United Kingdom) David Hobbs
- Debut: 1970 24 Hours of Le Mans
Races	Wins	Poles	F/Laps
8	0	0	0
- Teams' Championships: 0
- Constructors' Championships: 0

The Matra-Simca MS660 is a Group 6 prototype race car introduced in 1969 for the International Championship for Makes. The MS660 replaced the previous Matra-Simca MS650.

== Racing History ==
=== 1970 ===
The team entered three cars for the 24 Hours of Le Mans with Jean-Pierre Beltoise and Henri Pescarolo in the MS660, Jack Brabham/Francois Cevert and Patrick Depailler/Jean-Pierre Jabouille/Tim Schenken were both in the older Matra-Simca MS650 but all three cars retired with engine failure.

In the International Championship for Makes, Matra had scored four points, earning it fourth place in the championship, all the points were scored in the MS650.

=== 1971 ===
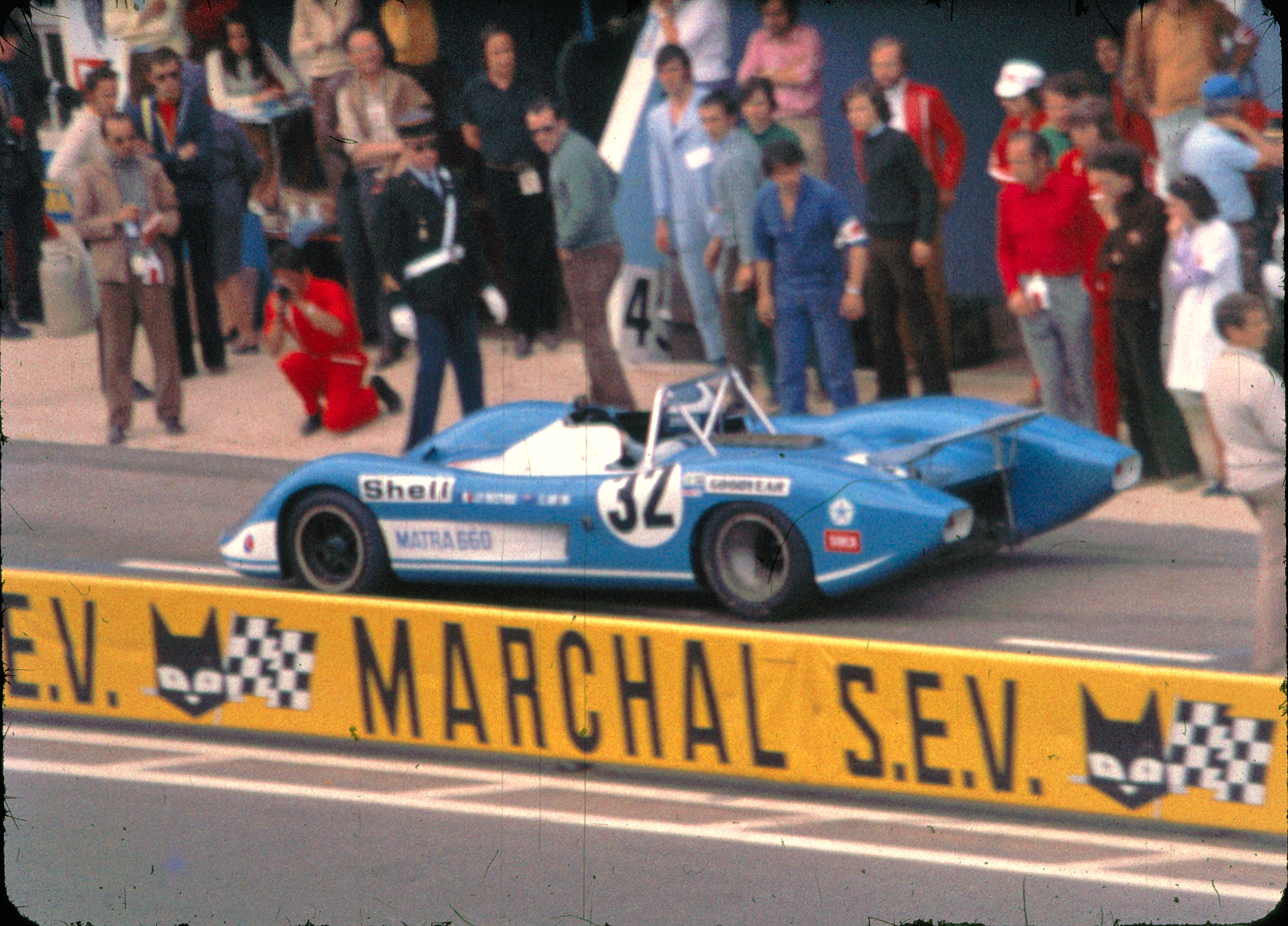
Rear view

The first race of the season was the 1971 1000 km Buenos Aires. Matra entered one car for Beltoise/Jabouille, but their car retired after it ran out of fuel. Beltoise pushed the car back to the pits only for race leader Ignazio Giunti in his Ferrari to run into the back of the disabled MS660. Both cars caught fire and Giunti was killed. As a result of the accident, Beltoise's international racing licence was suspended for some time. The team didn't enter another race until the 24 Hours of Le Mans with Beltoise and Chris Amon but it retired with a fuel system failure.

In the International Championship for Makes, Matra had scored no points.

=== 1972 ===
The team entered the 24 Hours of Le Mans with Jabouille and David Hobbs with an updated version of the MS660 known as the MS660C but it retired with a transmission issue. The car was replaced by the Matra-Simca MS670 from 1973.

In the International Championship for Makes, Matra had scored no points.

== Complete International Championship for Makes results ==
Year	Entrants	Class	Drivers	1	2	3	4	5	6	7	8	9	10	11	Points	ICMP
1970	Equipe Matra-Simca	Group 5		DAY	SEB	BHC	MZA	TGA	SPA	NÜR	LMS	WGN	ORC		4	4th
1970	Equipe Matra-Simca	Group 5	(France) Jean-Pierre Beltoise								35				4	4th
1970	Equipe Matra-Simca	Group 5	(France) Henri Pescarolo								35				4	4th
1971	Matra Sport	Group 5		BAI	DAY	SEB	BHC	MZA	SPA	TGA	NÜR	LMS	WGN	ORC	0	-
1971	Matra Sport	Group 5	(France) Jean-Pierre Beltoise	19								15			0	-
1971	Matra Sport	Group 5	(France) Jean-Pierre Jabouille	19											0	-
1971	Matra Sport	Group 5	(New Zealand) Chris Amon									15			0	-
1972	Equipe Matra-Simca Shell	Group 5		BAI	DAY	SEB	BRH	MZA	SPA	TGA	NÜR	LMS	ORC	WGN	20	7th
1972	Equipe Matra-Simca Shell	Group 5	(France) Jean-Pierre Jabouille									20			20	7th
1972	Equipe Matra-Simca Shell	Group 5	(United Kingdom) David Hobbs									20			20	7th
