= 1972 1000 km Buenos Aires =

Autodromo Municipal Ciudad de Buenos Aires No 15

The 1972 Buenos Aires 1000 Kilometers was the opening round of the 1972 World Championship for Makes season. It took place at the Autódromo Oscar Alfredo Gálvez, Argentina, on January 10, 1972. This would be the last time that the World Championship ran in a South American country.

Grand tourer class cars did not participate in this event.

== Official results ==
Class winners in bold. Cars failing to complete 70% of the winner's distance marked as Not Classified (NC).

Pos	Class	No	Team	Drivers	Chassis	Laps
Pos	Class	No	Team	Drivers	Engine	Laps
1	**S3.0**	**30**	**(Italy) SpA Ferrari SEFAC**	**(Sweden) Ronnie Peterson (Australia) Tim Schenken**	**Ferrari 312PB**	**168**
1	**S3.0**	**30**	**(Italy) SpA Ferrari SEFAC**	**(Sweden) Ronnie Peterson (Australia) Tim Schenken**	**Ferrari 3.0 Flat-12**	**168**
2	S3.0	32	(Italy) SpA Ferrari SEFAC	(Switzerland) Clay Regazzoni (United Kingdom) Brian Redman	Ferrari 312PB	168
2	S3.0	32	(Italy) SpA Ferrari SEFAC	(Switzerland) Clay Regazzoni (United Kingdom) Brian Redman	Ferrari 3.0L Flat-12	168
3	S3.0	10	(Italy) Giovanni Alberti	(Italy) Carlo Facetti (Italy) Giovanni Alberti (Italy) Andrea de Adamich	Alfa Romeo T33/3	162
3	S3.0	10	(Italy) Giovanni Alberti	(Italy) Carlo Facetti (Italy) Giovanni Alberti (Italy) Andrea de Adamich	Alfa Romeo 3.0L V8	162
4	S3.0	2	(Italy) Autodelta SpA	(United Kingdom) Vic Elford (Austria) Helmut Marko	Alfa Romeo 33TT3	160
4	S3.0	2	(Italy) Autodelta SpA	(United Kingdom) Vic Elford (Austria) Helmut Marko	Alfa Romeo 3.0L V8	160
5	**S2.0**	**36**	**(United Kingdom) Chevron Racing Team**	**(United Kingdom) John Hine (Spain) José Juncadella**	**Chevron B19**	**158**
5	**S2.0**	**36**	**(United Kingdom) Chevron Racing Team**	**(United Kingdom) John Hine (Spain) José Juncadella**	**Ford Cosworth FVC 2.0L I4**	**158**
6	S3.0	40	(Spain) Escuderia Montjuich	(Spain) Juan Fernández (Spain) Jorge de Bagration	Porsche 908/03	157
6	S3.0	40	(Spain) Escuderia Montjuich	(Spain) Juan Fernández (Spain) Jorge de Bagration	Porsche 3.0L Flat-8	157
7	S3.0	14	(Switzerland) Ecurie Bonnier	(France) Gérard Larrousse (United Kingdom) Chris Craft (Sweden) Reine Wisell	Lola T280	156
7	S3.0	14	(Switzerland) Ecurie Bonnier	(France) Gérard Larrousse (United Kingdom) Chris Craft (Sweden) Reine Wisell	Ford Cosworth DFV 3.0L V8	156
8	S2.0	34	(United Kingdom) Chevron Racing Team	(Spain) Niki Bosch (United Kingdom) John Bridges	Chevron B19	156
8	S2.0	34	(United Kingdom) Chevron Racing Team	(Spain) Niki Bosch (United Kingdom) John Bridges	Ford Cosworth FVC 2.0L I4	156
9	S3.0	8	(Italy) Autodelta SpA	(Italy) Nino Vaccarella (Argentina) Carlos Pairetti	Alfa Romeo 33TT3	153
9	S3.0	8	(Italy) Autodelta SpA	(Italy) Nino Vaccarella (Argentina) Carlos Pairetti	Alfa Romeo 3.0L V8	153
10	S3.0	28	(Italy) SpA Ferrari SEFAC	(Belgium) Jacky Ickx (United States) Mario Andretti	Ferrari 312PB	152
10	S3.0	28	(Italy) SpA Ferrari SEFAC	(Belgium) Jacky Ickx (United States) Mario Andretti	Ferrari 3.0L Flat-12	152
11	S2.0	26	(Italy) Abarth-Osella	(Argentina) Jorge Ternengo (Italy) Claudio Francisci	Abarth 2000SP/71	145
11	S2.0	26	(Italy) Abarth-Osella	(Argentina) Jorge Ternengo (Italy) Claudio Francisci	Abarth 2.0L I4	145
12	S2.0	38	(Italy) Eris Tondelli	(Italy) Eris Tondelli (Argentina) Carlos Pascualini	Chevron B19	137
12	S2.0	38	(Italy) Eris Tondelli	(Italy) Eris Tondelli (Argentina) Carlos Pascualini	Ford Cosworth FVC 2.0L I4	137
13	S2.0	16	(Switzerland) Ecurie Bonnier	(Italy) Gianpiero Moretti (Argentina) Carlos Ruesch	Lola T212	127
13	S2.0	16	(Switzerland) Ecurie Bonnier	(Italy) Gianpiero Moretti (Argentina) Carlos Ruesch	Ford Cosworth FVC 2.0L I4	127
14	S2.0	18	(Switzerland) Ecurie Bonnier	(Argentina) Hector Luis Gradassi (Argentina) Emilio Bertolini	Lola T212	118
14	S2.0	18	(Switzerland) Ecurie Bonnier	(Argentina) Hector Luis Gradassi (Argentina) Emilio Bertolini	Ford Cosworth FVC 2.0L I4	118
15 NC	S2.0	42	(France) Écurie Esmerelda	(France) Jean-Louis Lafosse (France) Georges Dumoing	Lola T212	103
15 NC	S2.0	42	(France) Écurie Esmerelda	(France) Jean-Louis Lafosse (France) Georges Dumoing	Ford Cosworth FVC 2.0L I4	103
16 DNF	S3.0	12	(Switzerland) Ecurie Bonnier	(France) Gérard Larrousse (Sweden) Reine Wisell	Lola T280	106
16 DNF	S3.0	12	(Switzerland) Ecurie Bonnier	(France) Gérard Larrousse (Sweden) Reine Wisell	Ford Cosworth DFV 3.0L V8	106
17 DNF	S3.0	6	(Italy) Autodelta SpA	(Netherlands) Toine Hezemans (Germany) Rolf Stommelen	Alfa Romeo 33TT3	71
17 DNF	S3.0	6	(Italy) Autodelta SpA	(Netherlands) Toine Hezemans (Germany) Rolf Stommelen	Alfa Romeo 3.0L V8	71
18 DNF	S3.0	4	(Italy) Autodelta SpA	(Italy) Andrea de Adamich (Italy) Nanni Galli	Alfa Romeo 33TT3	60
18 DNF	S3.0	4	(Italy) Autodelta SpA	(Italy) Andrea de Adamich (Italy) Nanni Galli	Alfa Romeo 3.0L V8	60
19 DNF	S2.0	24	(Italy) Abarth-Osella	(Austria) Dieter Quester (Spain) Alex Soler-Roig	Abarth 2000SP/71	60
19 DNF	S2.0	24	(Italy) Abarth-Osella	(Austria) Dieter Quester (Spain) Alex Soler-Roig	Abarth 2.0L I4	60
20 DNF	S2.0	22	(Italy) Abarth-Osella	(Italy) Arturo Merzario (Italy) Spartaco Dini	Abarth 2000SP/71	47
20 DNF	S2.0	22	(Italy) Abarth-Osella	(Italy) Arturo Merzario (Italy) Spartaco Dini	Abarth 2.0L I4	47
21 DNF	S2.0	20	(Switzerland) Ecurie Bonnier	(Belgium) Hughes de Fierlandt (Argentina) Jorge Cupeiro	Lola T212	13
21 DNF	S2.0	20	(Switzerland) Ecurie Bonnier	(Belgium) Hughes de Fierlandt (Argentina) Jorge Cupeiro	Ford Cosworth FVC 2.0L I4	13
22 DNF	S2.0	46	(Brazil) Ecurie Bino	(Brazil) Wilson Fittipaldi (Brazil) José Renato Catapani	Lola T212	8
22 DNF	S2.0	46	(Brazil) Ecurie Bino	(Brazil) Wilson Fittipaldi (Brazil) José Renato Catapani	Ford Cosworth FVC 2.0L I4	8
23 DNF	S2.0	44	(Italy) Grand Prix Motor Racing Org.	(Brazil) José Carlos Pace (Argentina) Angel Monguzzi	AMS 1300	4
23 DNF	S2.0	44	(Italy) Grand Prix Motor Racing Org.	(Brazil) José Carlos Pace (Argentina) Angel Monguzzi	Ford Cosworth FVC 2.0L I4	4
DNS	S3.0	48	(Argentina) Oreste Berta	(Argentina) Nestor García-Veiga (Argentina) Rubén Luis di Palma	Berta LR	-
DNS	S3.0	48	(Argentina) Oreste Berta	(Argentina) Nestor García-Veiga (Argentina) Rubén Luis di Palma	Ford Cosworth DFV 3.0L V8	-

== Statistics ==
- Pole Position - #30 SpA Ferrari SEFAC - 1:58.59
- Fastest Lap - #12 Ecurie Bonnier - 1:58.39
- Average Speed - 173.886 km/h

World Sportscar Championship
Previous race: None	1972 season	Next race: 1972 Daytona 6 Hours
