= 200 Miles of Buenos Aires =

Autodromo Municipal Ciudad de Buenos Aires No 14 (1968–1971)

The 200 Miles of Buenos Aires was a non-championship race sports car event held in Autódromo Oscar Alfredo Gálvez, Buenos Aires, Argentina. The race was held on January 18, 1970, after the 1000 km Buenos Aires race (11 January).

The race, which did not grant championship points, was won by Andrea De Adamich and Piers Courage driving an Alfa Romeo 33. 2nd and 3rd were a Porsche 908/02 and the works Matra MS630/650.

== Official results ==
Class winners in bold. Cars failing to complete 70% of the winner's distance marked as Not Classified (NC).

Position	Class	Number	Team	Drivers	Chassis	Engine	Laps
1		**6**	**(Italy) Autodelta**	**(United Kingdom) Piers Courage (Italy) Andrea de Adamich**	**Alfa Romeo T33/3**	**Alfa Romeo 3.0L V8**	
2		30	(Sweden) Sport Cars Brostrom	(United States) Masten Gregory	Porsche 908/02	Porsche 3.0L Flat-8	
3		10	(France) Equipe Matra-Simca	(France) Jean-Pierre Beltoise (France) Henri Pescarolo	Matra-Simca MS630/650	Matra 3.0L V12	
4		22	(Sweden) Ulf Norinder	(United Kingdom) Jackie Oliver	Lola T70 Mk. IIIB	Chevrolet 4.9L V8	
5		18	(Sweden) Ecurie Bonnier	(Sweden) Jo Bonnier	Lola T70 Mk. IIIB	Chevrolet 4.9L V8	
6		12	(Spain) Alex Soler-Roig	(Argentina) Carlos Reutemann (Spain) Alex Soler-Roig	Porsche 908/02	Porsche 3.0L Flat-8	
7		34	(Sweden) Swedish Racing Team	(West Germany) Hans Laine (Netherlands) Gijs van Lennep	Porsche 908/02	Porsche 3.0L Flat-8	
8		4	(Italy) Autodelta	(Italy) Nanni Galli (West Germany) Rolf Stommelen	Alfa Romeo T33/3	Alfa Romeo 3.0L V8	
9		32	(West Germany) Martini International Team	(Argentina) Andrea Vianini (West Germany) Gerhard Koch	Porsche 908/02	Porsche 3.0L Flat-8	
10		14	(Spain) Escuderia Montjuich	(Spain) José Juncadella (Spain) Juan Fernandez	Porsche 908/02	Porsche 3.0L Flat-8	
11		26	(United Kingdom) David Piper Autoracing	(United Kingdom) Chris Craft	Lola T70 Mk. IIIB	Chevrolet 4.9L V8	
12		26	(United Kingdom) E.S.C.A. Zitro	(Switzerland) Dominique Martin (United Kingdom) Piers Forester	Ford GT40	Ford4.9L V8	
13		52	(United Kingdom) David Prophet	(United Kingdom) David Prophet	Lola T70 Mk. IIIB	Chevrolet 4.9L V8	
DNF		2	(Argentina) Berta	(Argentina) Rubén Luis di Palma (Argentina) Carlos Marincovich	Berta LR Ford	Ford	
DNF		8	(Italy) Scuderia Serenissima	(United Kingdom) Jonathan Williams (Italy) Maurizio Montagnari	Serenissima		
