= 2001 Buenos Aires Grand Prix =

The Buenos Aires Circuit No:8

Results from the 2001 Buenos Aires Grand Prix held at Buenos Aires on June 17, 2001, in the Autódromo Oscar Alfredo Gálvez.

== Classification ==
Pos	Driver	Constructor	Laps	Time/Retired
1	(Brazil) Juliano Moro	Dallara F301-Mugen	35	42:17.931
2	(Brazil) Angelo Serafim	Dallara F301-Mugen	35	42:20.333
3	(Brazil) Henrique Favoretto	Dallara F301-Mugen	35	42:26.055
4	(Argentina) Gabriel Werner	Dallara F398-Mitsubishi	35	42:30.281
5	(Argentina) Ianina Zanazzi	Dallara F398-Mugen	35	42:30.800
6	(Brazil) Gastao Fraguas	Dallara F301-Opel	35	42:45.931
7	(Argentina) Carlos Bouflet	Dallara F394-Mitsubishi	35	42:49.468
8	(Brazil) Daniel Scandian	Dallara F394-Mugen	35	42:49.478
9	(Argentina) Matías Russo	Dallara F394-Mitsubishi	35	42:52.923
10	(Argentina) Ezequiel Baldinelli	Dallara F390-Mugen	35	42:54.203
11	(Argentina) José Savino	Dallara F394-Opel	35	43:01.328
12	(Brazil) Augusto Ferreira	Dallara F394-Mugen	35	43:27.358
DNF	(Argentina) Martin Canepa	Dallara F300-Mugen	33	
DNF	(Argentina) Franco Coscia	Dallara F398-Mitsubishi	20	
DNF	(Brazil) Thiago Medeiros	Dallara F301-Mugen	13	
DNF	(Brazil) Wagner Ebrahim	Dallara F300-Mugen	13	
DNF	(Brazil) Tuka Rocha	Dallara F394-Mugen	9	
DNF	(Brazil) José Medrado	Dallara F300-Mugen	6	
