= Ecurie Bonnier =

Motor racing team

- Full name: (Sweden) (Switzerland) Ecurie Bonnier / Joakim Bonnier Racing Team / Anglo-Suisse Racing Team / Ecurie Suisse
- Founder(s): (Sweden) Joakim Bonnier
- Noted drivers: (Sweden) Joakim Bonnier (Austria) Helmut Marko (United States) Harry Schell (United States) Phil Hill (Italy) Giulio Cabianca (Germany) Hans Herrmann

Formula One World Championship career
- First entry: 1957 British Grand Prix
- Races entered: 45
- Constructors: Maserati; Cooper; Brabham; McLaren; Honda; Lotus
- Final entry: 1971 United States Grand Prix

Ecurie Bonnier, Ecurie Suisse, Joakim Bonnier Racing Team and Anglo-Suisse Racing Team were names used by Swedish racing driver Joakim Bonnier to enter his own cars in Formula One, Formula Two and sports car racing between 1957 and his death in 1972. Commonly the vehicles were entered for Bonnier himself, but he also provided cars for a number of other drivers during the period.

== Formula One ==
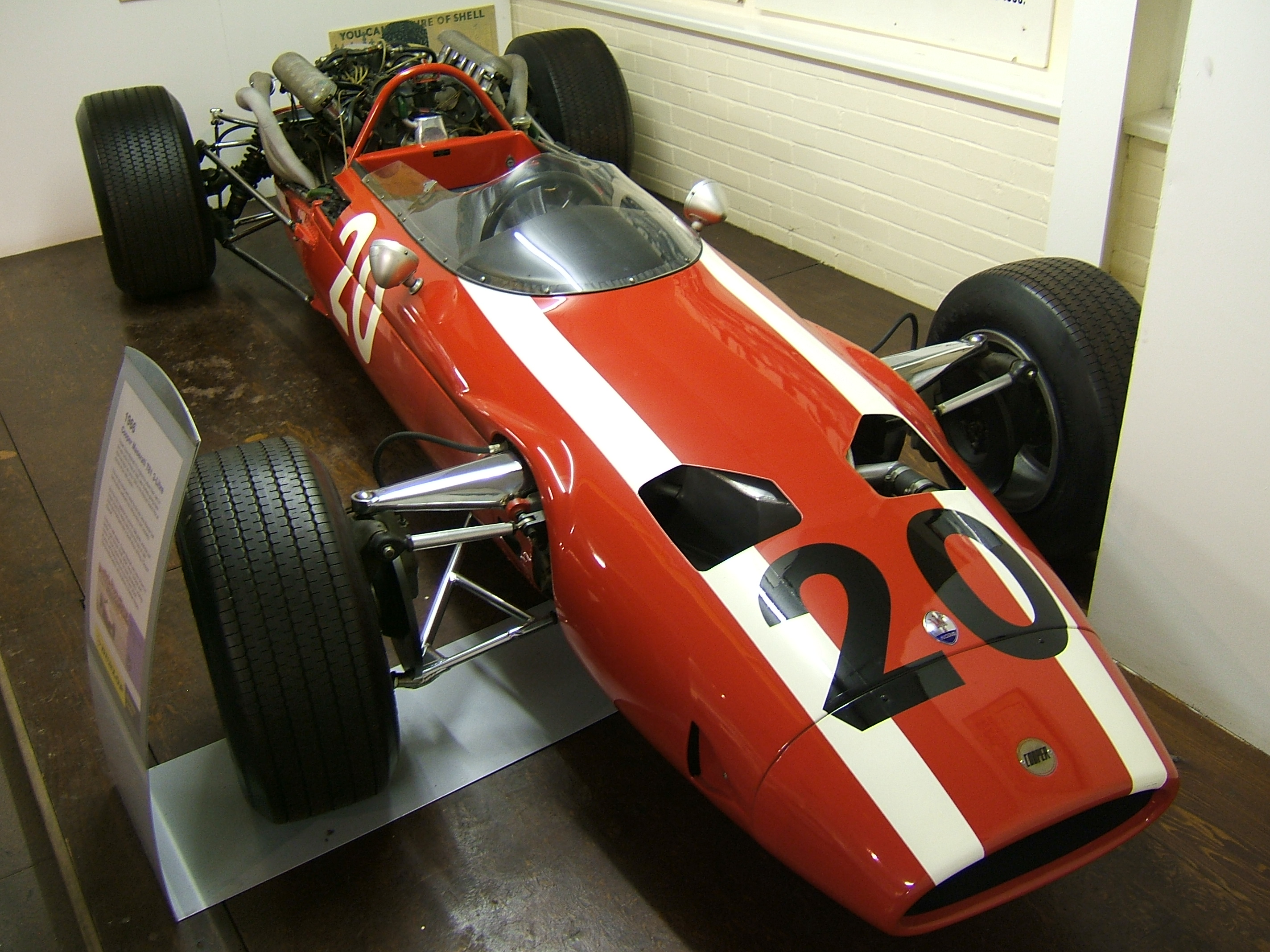
The Anglo-Suisse Racing Team Cooper-Maserati T81, used from 1966 to 1968

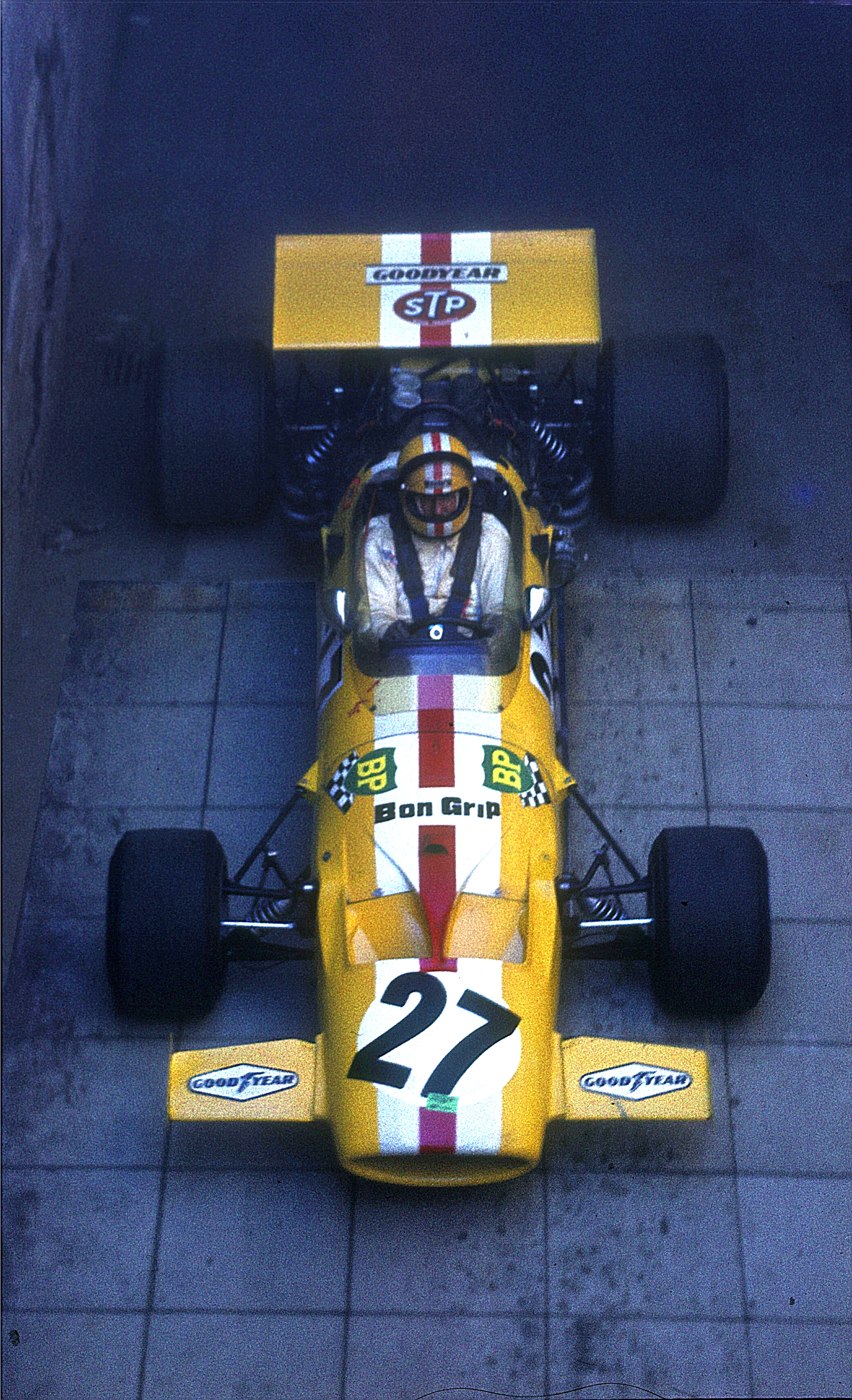
Bonnier in his McLaren M7C at the 1971 German Grand Prix

Jo Bonnier began entering cars in Formula One under his own name in 1957, first with a Maserati 250F, without much success, recording only two non-points scoring finishes from his six World Championship entries in 1957 and 1958. However, with strong performances in other races Bonnier attracted the attention of more established teams, and over the next seven years principally drove for the works BRM and Porsche teams, and Rob Walker's highly organised privateer outfit.

Bonnier returned to entering his own team in 1966, under the name Anglo-Suisse Racing to reflect his residency in Switzerland at the time. His principal mount that year was a Cooper-Maserati T81, painted in Swiss racing red and white. The year started promisingly at the season-opening non-Championship 1966 BRDC International Trophy at the Silverstone Circuit, with Bonnier qualifying the Cooper in sixth place and finishing a strong third, but the rest of the season brought little joy. A crash in the first lap of the Belgian Grand Prix destroyed his Cooper T81. While the car was repaired Bonnier entered an Alf Francis built Cooper-ATS at the French Grand Prix. After the Cooper-ATS did not prove to be competitive in practice Bonnier made a deal with the Brabham team and drove their spare car for the rest of the weekend. Bonnier's Cooper T81 was repaired in time for the Dutch Grand Prix after having driven a Brabham BT7 at the British Grand Prix. Anglo-Suisse Racing's first Championship points would come at the season-closing 1966 Mexican Grand Prix, from sixth place.

Bonnier continued to enter the Cooper during 1967, but under the Joakim Bonnier Racing Team banner. The season was marginally more productive than the previous year, with Bonnier scoring Championship points in Germany and the US. In 1968 Bonnier started the season with the aging Cooper, but this was rapidly replaced by the unique, ex-works McLaren-BRM M5A for the majority of that year's races. At the final race of the season, the 1968 Mexican Grand Prix, Honda offered Bonnier the use of a spare RA301 when the McLaren's BRM engine failed during practice. It was with the Honda that Bonnier scored his eponymous team's best World Championship result: fifth.

At the end of 1968 Bonnier himself decided to step back from Formula One competition and concentrate on his sports car commitments. He continued to make occasional appearances, however. In 1969 the new Ecurie Bonnier name appeared alongside Team Lotus's co-entered Lotus 63 experimental four-wheel drive car at the 1969 British Grand Prix, and with a conventional Lotus 49B at the next race in Germany. Bonnier retired without scoring points on both occasions. In 1970 and 1971 Ecurie Bonnier raced with a McLaren M7C. Bonnier made tentative steps to act as an entrant for other drivers in 1971, entering young Austrian Helmut Marko for the 1971 German Grand Prix. However, he quit after running out of petrol on his first practice lap, leaving Bonnier to drive in his stead. Having failed to even qualify at some races, Bonnier decided to quit Formula One for good at the end of 1971.

=== Complete Formula One World Championship results ===
(key) (Results in bold indicate pole position; results in italics indicate fastest lap; † indicates shared drive.)

Year	Chassis	Engine(s)	Tyres	Drivers	1	2	3	4	5	6	7	8	9	10	11	12	13
1957	Maserati 250F	Maserati 250F1 2.5 L6	P		ARG	MON	500	FRA	GBR	GER	PES	ITA					
1957	Maserati 250F	Maserati 250F1 2.5 L6	P	(Sweden) Jo Bonnier					Ret								
1958	Maserati 250F	Maserati 250F1 2.5 L6	P		ARG	MON	NED	500	BEL	FRA	GBR	GER	POR	ITA	MOR		
1958	Maserati 250F	Maserati 250F1 2.5 L6	P	(United States) Harry Schell	6												
1958	Maserati 250F	Maserati 250F1 2.5 L6	P	(Sweden) Jo Bonnier		Ret	10		9		Ret		Ret				
1958	Maserati 250F	Maserati 250F1 2.5 L6	P	(United States) Phil Hill						7							
1958	Maserati 250F	Maserati 250F1 2.5 L6	P	(Italy) Giulio Cabianca										Ret			
1958	Maserati 250F	Maserati 250F1 2.5 L6	P	(Germany) Hans Herrmann										Ret	9		
1966	Cooper T81	Maserati 9/F1 3.0 V12	F		MON	BEL	FRA	GBR	NED	GER	ITA	USA	MEX				
1966	Cooper T81	Maserati 9/F1 3.0 V12	F	(Sweden) Jo Bonnier	NC	Ret			7	Ret	Ret	NC	6				
1966	Brabham BT22	Climax FPF 2.8 L4	F	(Sweden) Jo Bonnier			NC										
1966	Brabham BT7	Climax FWMV 1.5 V8 (Note: Sources differ in whether the engine for Bonnier's entry for the 1966 British Grand Prix was 1.5 or 2.0 litres. However, the contemporary race report in Motor Sport magazine suggests that there were only sufficient parts to create two 2.0L FWMV engines, both for Team Lotus, and that Bonnier's entry was not intended to be competitive as he was acting as a stand-in for the absent Ferrari cars for filming of John Frankenheimer's movie Grand Prix. Taking these factors into account, it appears most likely that the engine used was the car's original 1.5L unit.)	F	(Sweden) Jo Bonnier				Ret									
1967					RSA	MON	NED	BEL	FRA	GBR	GER	CAN	ITA	USA	MEX		
1967	Cooper T81	Maserati 9/F1 3.0 V12	F	(Sweden) Jo Bonnier	Ret			Ret		Ret	6	8	Ret	6	10		
1968					RSA	ESP	MON	BEL	NED	FRA	GBR	GER	ITA	CAN	USA	MEX	
1968	Cooper T81	Maserati 9/F1 3.0 V12	F	(Sweden) Jo Bonnier	Ret												
1968	McLaren M5A	BRM P101 3.0 V12	G	(Sweden) Jo Bonnier			DNQ	Ret	8		Ret		6	Ret	NC	DNS	
1968	Honda RA301	Honda RA301E 3.0 V12	F	(Sweden) Jo Bonnier												5	
1969					RSA	ESP	MON	NED	FRA	GBR	GER	ITA	CAN	USA	MEX		
1969	Lotus 63	Ford Cosworth DFV 3.0 V8	F	(Sweden) Jo Bonnier						Ret							
1969	Lotus 49B	Ford Cosworth DFV 3.0 V8	F	(Sweden) Jo Bonnier							Ret						
1970					RSA	ESP	MON	BEL	NED	FRA	GBR	GER	AUT	ITA	CAN	USA	MEX
1970	McLaren M7C	Ford Cosworth DFV 3.0 V8	G	(Sweden) Jo Bonnier										DNQ		Ret	
1971					RSA	ESP	MON	NED	FRA	GBR	GER	AUT	ITA	CAN	USA		
1971	McLaren M7C	Ford Cosworth DFV 3.0 V8	G	(Sweden) Jo Bonnier	Ret						DNQ	DNS	10		16		
1971	McLaren M7C	Ford Cosworth DFV 3.0 V8	G	(Austria) Helmut Marko							DNS						

== Formula Two ==
Jo Bonnier first entered Formula Two cars in 1966, for the Swiss driver Jo Siffert who drove a Cooper-BRM T82 painted in Swiss racing red and white. The first race of the season was scheduled for Oulton Park but although practice was held the race was cancelled because of snow on the track. Siffert was 15th in practice, almost seven seconds behind the fastest man Jim Clark. At Goodwood Siffert finished in seventh position, one lap behind race winner Jack Brabham. After a crash in practice Siffert failed to start at Pau as the team was unable repair the car before the race. At Reims Bonnier drove the Cooper to ninth position, two laps down on race winner Jack Brabham. Bonnier but didn't fare much better at Rouen as he retired from the race on lap five. Swedish driver Sten Axelsson drove he car at the Karlskoga Motorstadion and finished in 9th place. At the Keimola Ring in Finland local driver Max Johanson drove the car to a 12th position. Giancarlo Baghetti drove the Cooper at the Autodrome de Linas-Montlhéry where he retired on lap seven after an electrical failure. Baghetti was also entered in the Formula two class at the German Grand Prix but the team did not attend.

In 1971 Ecurie Bonnier entered a car in the European Formula Two Championship for the young Austrian Helmut Marko. In the first race of the season at Hockenheim Marko was not classified because he failed to finish the second heat. After skipping Thruxton Marko finished eight at the Nürburgring and scored one championship point, but then failed to finish at Jarama and the non championship round at Imola. Jo Bonnier drove the car at the season finale in Vallelunga, where he finished in 12th position.

=== Complete European Formula Two results ===
(key) (Results in bold indicate pole position; results in italics indicate fastest lap; † indicates shared drive.)

Year	Chassis	Engine(s)	Drivers	1	2	3	4	5	6	7	8	9	10	11
1971	Lola T240	Cosworth FVA		HOC	THR	NÜR	JAR	PAL	ROU	MAN	TUL	ALB	VAL	VAL
1971	Lola T240	Cosworth FVA	(Austria) Helmut Marko	Ret		8	Ret							
1971	Lola T240	Cosworth FVA	(Sweden) Jo Bonnier											12

== Sports car racing ==
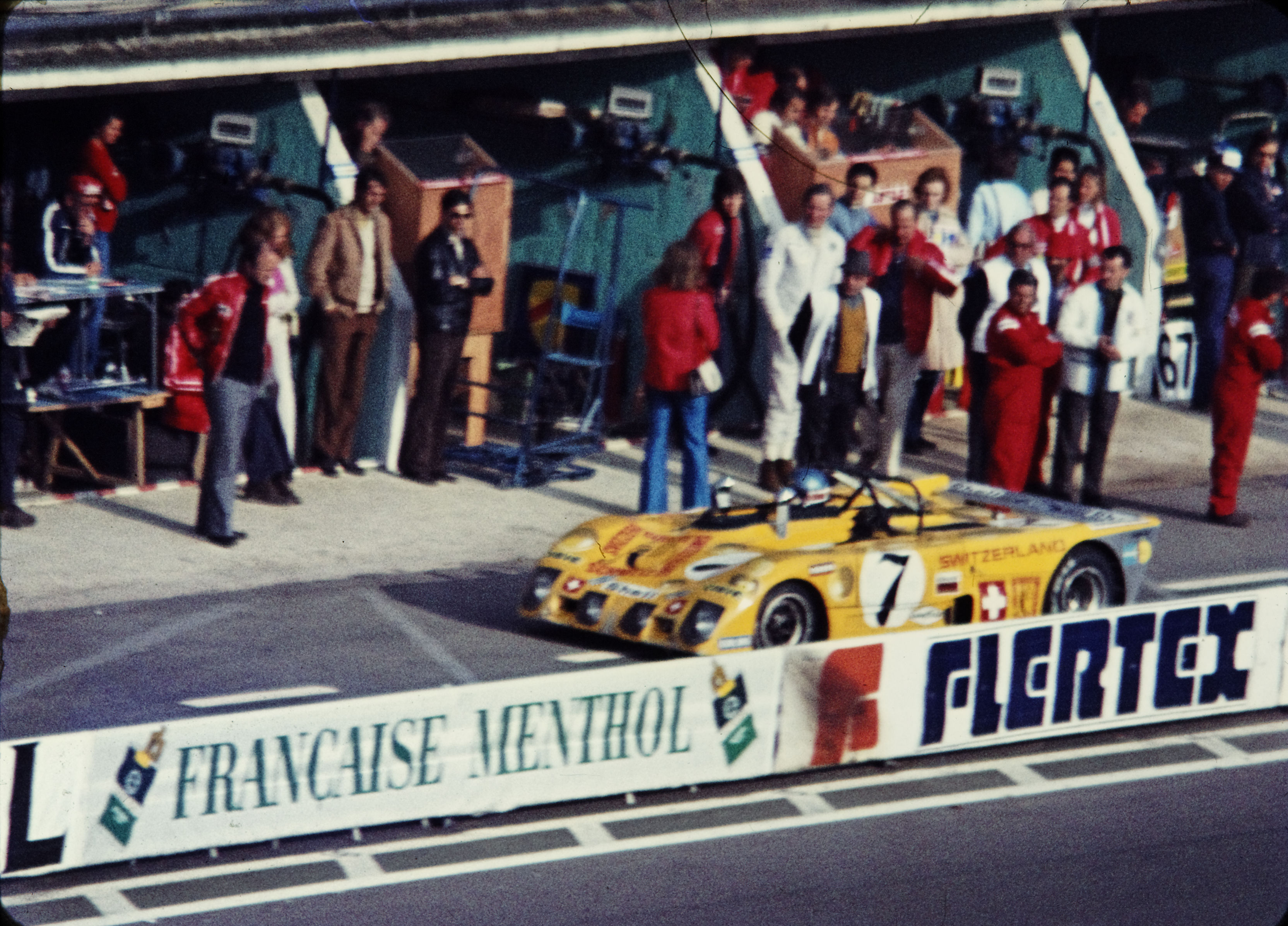
The No. 7 Lola T280 at the 1972 24 Hours of Le Mans

It was with sports cars that Jo Bonnier first became involved in motor racing, entering Alfa Romeo saloons and sports cars in various Scandinavian rally, ice racing and circuit championships during the early 1950s. He stepped up to true racing sports cars with various Maserati two-seaters, including his own Maserati 150S. In common with his single seater career, the majority of Bonnier's sports car entries during the first half of the 1960s were with works or established privateer teams, and it wasn't until the latter years of that decade that he began to enter his own cars once again.

For 1968 Bonnier purchased a McLaren M6B for use in the North American Can-Am series, and an ex-John Surtees Lola T70 Mk3 GT for use in European races. Both were finished in the Ecurie Bonnier/Ecurie Suisse Swedish racing yellow, but retained vestiges of the previous year's Anglo-Suisse identity with longitudinal white and red stripes along their centre line. Results with the McLaren were generally disappointing, with Ecurie Suisse's best result being third place against mainly local opposition at the Can-Am series' non-Championship 200 mile race at the Fuji Speedway in Japan. The Lola proved more competitive, however, and Bonnier took top ten places at two of the four World Sportscar Championship (WSC) races that he contested in 1968, finished in second in the Players Trophy race at Silverstone, and won both the Anderstorp and Norisring 200 km races. For 1969 Ecurie Suisse upgraded to the new Lola Mk3B specification car, in keeping with the newly introduced FIA sports car rules. With this car Bonnier finished fifth in the 1969 1000 km Spa race, and he took two second-place finishes in the 1969 British RAC Sports Car Championship.

For 1970 Ecurie Suisse took a new route. Rather than just fielding large capacity sports cars such as the McLaren and Lola T70s, the team decided to concentrate on the 2,000 cc (122 cu in) class. Retaining the Ecurie Suisse yellow livery, but running under the Ecurie Bonnier moniker, the little Lola T210 provided excellent results, with Bonnier taking class wins in the Salzburgring, Anderstorp, Hockenheim and Enna rounds of the European Sportscar Championship (ESC), in addition to second places at Paul Ricard and Spa. This secured the series title for the, by now veteran, Swede. In 1971 Ecurie Bonnier switched entirely to the smaller capacity cars, fielding an updated, T212-specification Lola for Italian driver Mario Casoni. Bonnier himself drove a similar car entered by Scuderia Filipinetti.

In 1972 Ecurie Bonnier decided to expand and upgrade their stable, with brand new three litre Lola-Cosworth T280 cars for Bonnier and new team mates Reine Wisell, Gérard Larrousse and Chris Craft in the WSC, alongside the year old Filipinetti/Bonnier T212s for a number of junior drivers. The team also ran T290 Lolas in the ESC, for Jorge de Bagration, Claude Swietlik, Roland Heiler and others. While the T280s chassis was a proven unit, the Cosworth DFV engine had been designed with Formula One racing in mind and frequently failed to complete the longer distances required of sports car racing. Sadly for Bonnier and his team, the Swede's long driving career was to come to an end at the wheel of one of his own cars. For the 1972 24 Hours of Le Mans race Bonnier was sharing a T280 with Larrousse and Gijs van Lennep. Things were going well, with Bonnier's car leading briefly and setting fastest lap before transmission troubles, but in attempting to lap the Ferrari Daytona of Florian Vetsch Bonnier instead ran into the back of the slower car. The Lola was sent spinning into the trees and Bonnier was killed instantly. Ecurie Bonnier limped on into the 1973 season – with the team's new T292 Lolas sporting sponsorship backing from Portuguese property investment company BIP and piloted by a number of Portuguese drivers, including Carlos Gaspar and Jorge Pinhol—but at the end of the season Ecurie Bonnier was wound up for good.
