= 2006 Buenos Aires Grand Prix Race 2 =

Motorsport competition

The Buenos Aires Circuit No:7

Results from the 2006 Buenos Aires Grand Prix held at Buenos Aires on October 29, 2006, in the Autódromo Oscar Alfredo Gálvez.The race was the second race for the 2006 Buenos Aires Grand Prix of Formula Three Sudamericana.

== Classification ==
Pos	Driver	Constructor	Laps	Time/Retired
1	(Brazil) Diego Nunes	Dallara-Berta		30'37.854"
2	(Brazil) Luiz Razia	Dallara-Berta		
3	(Brazil) Fábio Beretta	Dallara-Berta		
4	(Brazil) Mario Moraes	Dallara-Berta		
5	(Brazil) Luiz Boesel	Dallara-Berta		
6	(Brazil) Fernando Galera	Dallara-Berta		
7	(Brazil) Pedro Nunes	Dallara-Berta		
8	(Brazil) Bia Figueiredo	Dallara-Berta		
9	(Brazil) Paulo Meyer	Dallara-Berta		
Ret	(Brazil) Caio Costa	Dallara-Berta		
Ret	(Brazil) Nelson Merlo	Dallara-Berta		DNF
Ret	(Brazil) Clemente Faria Jr	Dallara-Berta		DNF
