= 1964 Buenos Aires Grand Prix =

The Buenos Aires Circuit No:2

The 1964 Buenos Aires Grand Prix was a motor race held at the Autódromo Juan y Óscar Gálvez circuit on February 16, 1964.

== Classification ==
Pos	Driver	Constructor	Laps	Time/Retired
1	(Switzerland) Silvio Moser	Brabham BT6-Ford/Holbay	40	1:10:55.7
2	(Italy) Bruno Deserti	Lotus 27 - Ford	40	1:12:05.5
3	(Switzerland) Karl Foitek	Lotus 27 - Ford	40	1:12:55.3
4	(Switzerland) Walter Habegger	Cooper T67 - Ford	40	1:13:54.1
5	(Italy) Carlo Facetti	Lotus 22 - Ford	40	1:13:56.3
6	(Italy) Corrado Manfredini	Wainer 63 - Ford	40	1:13:57.0
7	(Argentina) Néstor Salerno	Stanguellini - Fiat	40	1:14:16.7
8	(Italy) Gastone Zanarotti	Lola Mk 5 - Ford	39	
9	(Italy) Luigi Malanca	Lotus 22 - Ford	38	
10	(Italy) Francesco Franzan	Lotus 22 - Ford	38	
11	(Italy) Giancarlo Moiso	Lotus 22 - Ford	38	
Ret	(Italy) Francesco Ghezzi	Lotus 27 - Ford	34	DNF
Ret	(Argentina) Alberto Rodríguez Larreta	Stanguellini - Fiat	33	DNF
Ret	(Italy) Massimo Natili	Cooper	31	DNF
Ret	(Switzerland) Franz Dörfliger	Lotus 27 - Ford	28	DNF
Ret	(Italy) Odoardo Govoni	Lotus 22 - Ford	23	DNF
Ret	(Uruguay) Alberico Passadore	Lotus 27 - Ford	21	DNF
Ret	(Italy) Giacomo Russo	Wainer 63 - Ford	20	DNF
Ret	(Italy) Carmelo Genovese	Stanguellini - Fiat		DNF
Ret	(Argentina) Jack Forrest Greene	Lotus - Ford	8	DNF
Ret	(Argentina) Nasif Estéfano	Lotus - Ford	8	DNF
Ret	(Italy) Mario Casoni	Cooper T56 - Ford	6	DNF
Ret	(Argentina) Juan Manuel Bordeu	Lotus 22 - Ford	5	DNF
Ret	(Italy) Guglielmo Bellasi	Lotus 22 - Ford		DNF
Ret	(Argentina) Carlos Menditeguy	Lotus - Ford		DNS
Ret	(Peru) Pitty Block	Lotus		DNA
