= 1972 World Sportscar Championship =

Racing tournament

Seasons
- ← 1971 1973 →

The 1972 World Championship for Makes and International Grand Touring Trophy seasons were the 20th season of the FIA World Sportscar Championship. It was a series for FIA Group 5 Sports Cars and FIA Group 4 Grand Touring Cars. It ran from 9 January 1972 to 22 July 1972, and was composed of 11 races.

== Schedule ==
Rnd	Race	Circuit or Location	Date
1	(Argentina) 1000km of Buenos Aires^{†}	Autódromo Oscar Alfredo Gálvez	10 January
2	(United States) Daytona 6 Hours	Daytona International Speedway	6 February
3	(United States) 12 Hours of Sebring	Sebring International Raceway	25 March
4	(United Kingdom) BOAC 1000km^{†}	Brands Hatch	16 April
5	(Italy) 1000km Monza	Autodromo Nazionale Monza	25 April
6	(Belgium) 1000km Spa	Circuit de Spa-Francorchamps	7 May
7	(Italy) Targa Florio	Circuito Piccolo delle Madonie	21 May
8	(Germany) ADAC 1000km Nürburgring	Nürburgring	28 May
9	(France) 24 Hours of Le Mans	Circuit de la Sarthe	10 June; 11 June
10	(Austria) Austrian 1000km	Österreichring	25 June
11	(United States) Watkins Glen 6 Hours	Watkins Glen International	22 July

† - Sportscars only, GT class did not participate.

== Season results ==
Points were awarded to the top 10 finishers in the order of 20-15-12-10-8-6-4-3-2-1. Manufacturers were only given points for their highest finishing car; any other cars from that manufacturer were skipped in the awarding of points, but any finish in the points prevented other manufacturers from scoring these points.

=== Races ===
Rnd	Circuit	Sportscar Winning Team	GT Winning Team	Results
Rnd	Circuit	Sportscar Winning Drivers	GT Winning Drivers	Results
1	Buenos Aires	(Italy) #30 SpA Ferrari SEFAC	None	Results
1	Buenos Aires	(Sweden) Ronnie Peterson (Australia) Tim Schenken		Results
2	Daytona	(Italy) #2 SpA Ferrari SEFAC	(United States) #59 Brumos Porsche	Results
2	Daytona	(United States) Mario Andretti (Belgium) Jacky Ickx	(United States) Hurley Haywood (United States) Peter Gregg	Results
3	Sebring	(Italy) #2 SpA Ferrari SEFAC	(United States) #57 Dana English	Results
3	Sebring	(United States) Mario Andretti (Belgium) Jacky Ickx	(United States) Dave Heinz (United States) Robert R. Johnson	Results
4	Brands Hatch	(Italy) #11 SpA Ferrari SEFAC	None	Results
4	Brands Hatch	(United States) Mario Andretti (Belgium) Jacky Ickx		Results
5	Monza	(Italy) #1 SpA Ferrari SEFAC	(Italy) #44 Ugo Locatelli	Results
5	Monza	(Switzerland) Clay Regazzoni (Belgium) Jacky Ickx	(Italy) Ugo Locatelli (Italy) "Pal Joe"	Results
6	Spa-Francorchamps	(Italy) #3 SpA Ferrari SEFAC	(France) #42 Claude Dubois	Results
6	Spa-Francorchamps	(United Kingdom) Brian Redman (Italy) Arturo Merzario	(France) Jean-Marie Jacquemin (Belgium) Yves Deprez	Results
7	Targa Florio	(Italy) #3 SpA Ferrari SEFAC	(Italy) #38 Ennio Bonomelli	Results
7	Targa Florio	(Italy) Arturo Merzario (Italy) Sandro Munari	(Italy) Pino Pica (Italy) Gabriele Gottifredi	Results
8	Nürburgring	(Italy) #3 SpA Ferrari SEFAC	(Germany) #55 Kremer Porsche Racing	Results
8	Nürburgring	(Sweden) Ronnie Peterson (Australia) Tim Schenken	(Germany) Erwin Kremer (United Kingdom) John Fitzpatrick	Results
9	La Sarthe	(France) #15 Equipe Matra-Simca Shell	(France) #18 Charles Pozzi	Results
9	La Sarthe	(France) Henri Pescarolo (United Kingdom) Graham Hill	(France) Claude Ballot-Léna (France) Jean-Claude Andruet	Results
10	Österreichring	(Italy) #1 SpA Ferrari SEFAC	(Germany) #33 Sachs Racing	Results
10	Österreichring	(United Kingdom) Brian Redman (Belgium) Jacky Ickx	(Germany) Alex Janda (Switzerland) Hans Schulze-Schwering	Results
11	Watkins Glen	(Italy) #85 SpA Ferrari SEFAC	(United States) #22 North American Racing Team	Results
11	Watkins Glen	(United States) Mario Andretti (Belgium) Jacky Ickx	(France) Jean-Pierre Jarier (United States) Peter Gregg	Results

== Manufacturers Championships ==
=== Overall Manufacturers Championship ===
Group 5 Sports Cars and Group 4 Grand Touring Cars were awarded points for the overall championship, but the GT class also had their own separate award.

Cars participating in races that were not included in the Sports or GT classes (such as Group 2 Touring Cars) were skipped when awarding points for the overall championship.

Only the best 8 points finishes counted towards the championship, with any other points earned not included in the total. Discarded points are shown in brackets.

Pos	Manufacturer	Rd 1	Rd 2	Rd 3	Rd 4	Rd 5	Rd 6	Rd 7	Rd 8	Rd 9	Rd 10	Rd 11	Total
1	(Italy) Ferrari	20	20	20	20	20	20	20	20	(8)	(20)	(20)	160
2	(Italy) Alfa Romeo	12	12	12	12			15	12	10			85
3	(Germany) Porsche	6	4	8	(2)	15	3	8	(2)	12	(1)	10	66
4	(United Kingdom) Lola	4	6	6	4		8	10	6		4		48
5	(United Kingdom) Chevron	8			3		12		8		8	2	41
6	(United Kingdom) Mirage						10		10			12	32
7	(France) Matra-Simca									20			20
8	(United States) Chevrolet		3	10								1	14
9	(Italy) De Tomaso					8	4						12
10	(Italy) Tondelli					6							6
11	(Italy) Abarth							4					4

=== GT Manufacturers Trophy ===
The GT class did not participate in Rounds 1 and 4. Only the best 7 finishes counted.

Pos	Manufacturer	Rd 2	Rd 3	Rd 5	Rd 6	Rd 7	Rd 8	Rd 9	Rd 10	Rd 11	Total
1	(Germany) Porsche	20	15		15	20	20	(6)	15	15	120
2	(Italy) Ferrari	6	12		6			20		20	64
3	(Italy) De Tomaso			20	20			3	20		63
4	(United States) Chevrolet	15	20					4		10	49
5	(Italy) Alfa Romeo					8					8
6	(Germany) Opel						6				6
