= Ferrari Dino 166 F2 =

Italian race car

Dino 166 F2
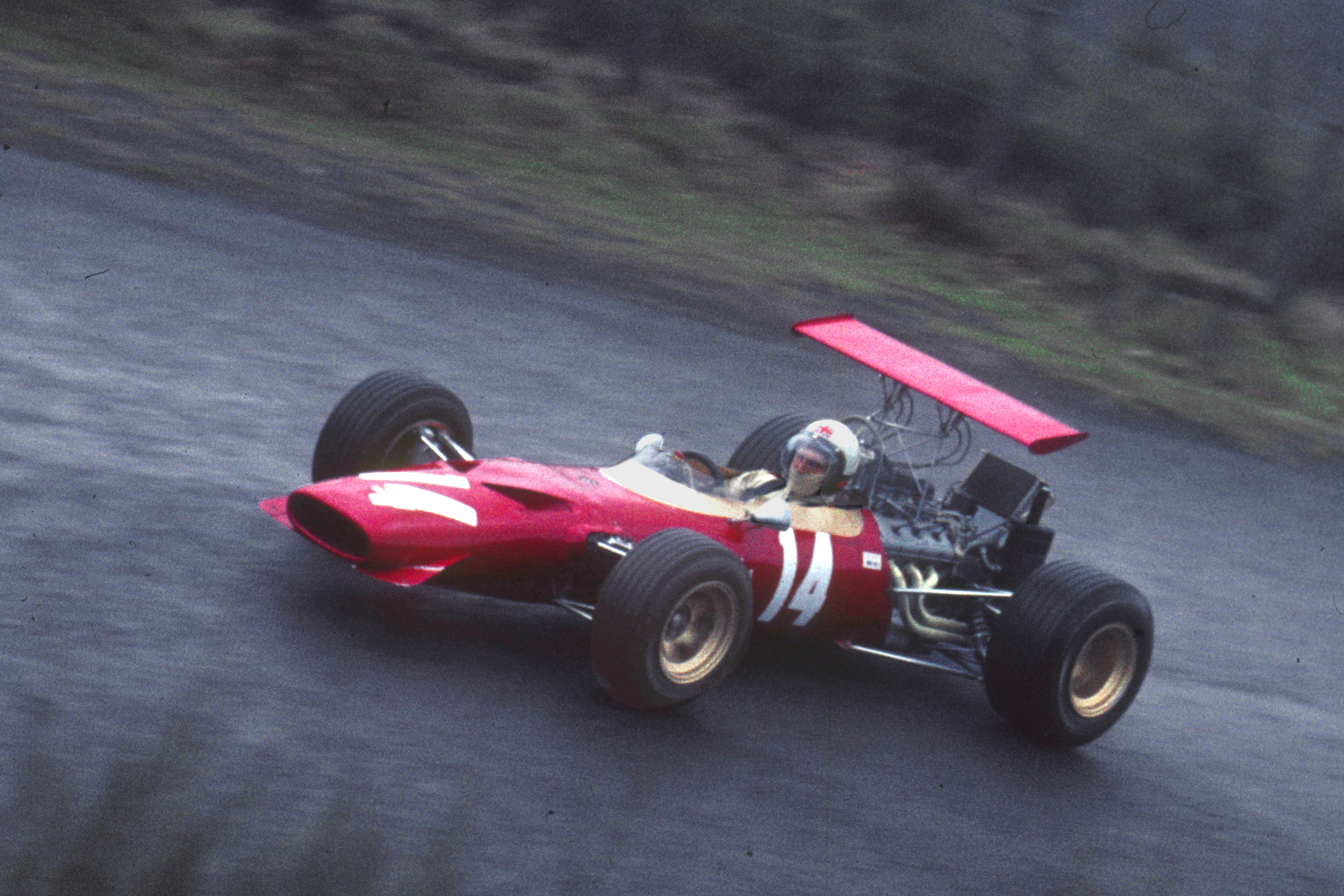
- Derek Bell's Dino 166 F2 on Nürburgring

Overview
- Also called: Ferrari Dino 166 F2
- Production: 1967; 7 produced

Body and chassis
- Layout: Rear mid-engine, rear-wheel-drive

Powertrain
- Engine: 1.6 L (1596.25 cc) Dino 65° V6
- Power output: 220 PS
- Transmission: 5-speed manual

Dimensions
- Wheelbase: 2,220 mm (87.4 in)
- Length: 3,449 mm (135.8 in)
- Curb weight: 425–430 kg (937–948 lb)

The Ferrari Dino 166 F2 was an open-wheel Formula 2 race car, designed, developed, and built by Italian racing team Scuderia Ferrari, in 1967. A total of seven models were manufactured and produced.

== History and races ==
The Scuderia's activities in Formula 2 remained limited. Ferrari had already built monopostos according to Formula 2 regulations, but only when the Formula 1 World Championship (partly in the 1950s) held its races on the basis of Formula 2.

In 1967, the Formula 2 European Championship was introduced as a separate racing series. The Ferrari Dino 166 F2 was developed for this series. The car had a six-cylinder engine based on the Dino V-6 from the road car. The chassis consisted of tubes and sheet metal. The Scuderia brought the Dino to the start of a race only once, in 1967. In 1968 efforts became more serious. The engine was equipped with 24 valves, the car was revised. Ernesto Brambilla and Derek Bell finished third and fourth in the championship.

The Formula 2 program ended at the end of 1969. Bell finished fifth and Brambilla eighth in the championship. However, the car was used for a short time. At the turn of the year 1969/1970, Andrea de Adamich drove the Argentine Temporada, a series of monoposto vehicles, but without great success. Chris Amon showed that the car was fundamentally competitive with his overall victory in the 1969 Tasman Series.

== Technical data ==
| Technical data | Ferrari Dino 166 F2 |
|---|---|
| Engine: | V six-cylinder (65°), mid-engine (longitudinally behind the driver) |
| displacement: | 1596.25 cm^{3} |
| Bore x stroke: | 86 x 45.8 mm |
| Compression: | 11.0:1 |
| Max power at rpm: | 220 hp at 10 000 rpm |
| Valve control: | Double-overhead camshafts per cylinder bank, 3-valves per cylinder |
| Valves per cylinder: | 3 pcs |
| Fuel system: | Lucas indirectly |
| Gearbox: | five-speed gearbox, rear-wheel drive |
| suspension front and rear: | double wishbones (different lengths), internal coil springs and shock absorbers, anti-roll bar Steering system: Rack and pinion steering |
| Brakes: | Disc brakes |
| Chassis & body: | Semi-monocoque, tubular steel chassis with riveted aluminium panels |
| Fuel tank capacity: | 110 L (29 US gal) |
| Wheelbase: | 225 cm |
| Dry weight: | 425 kg |
