= Ford Cupé V-8 =

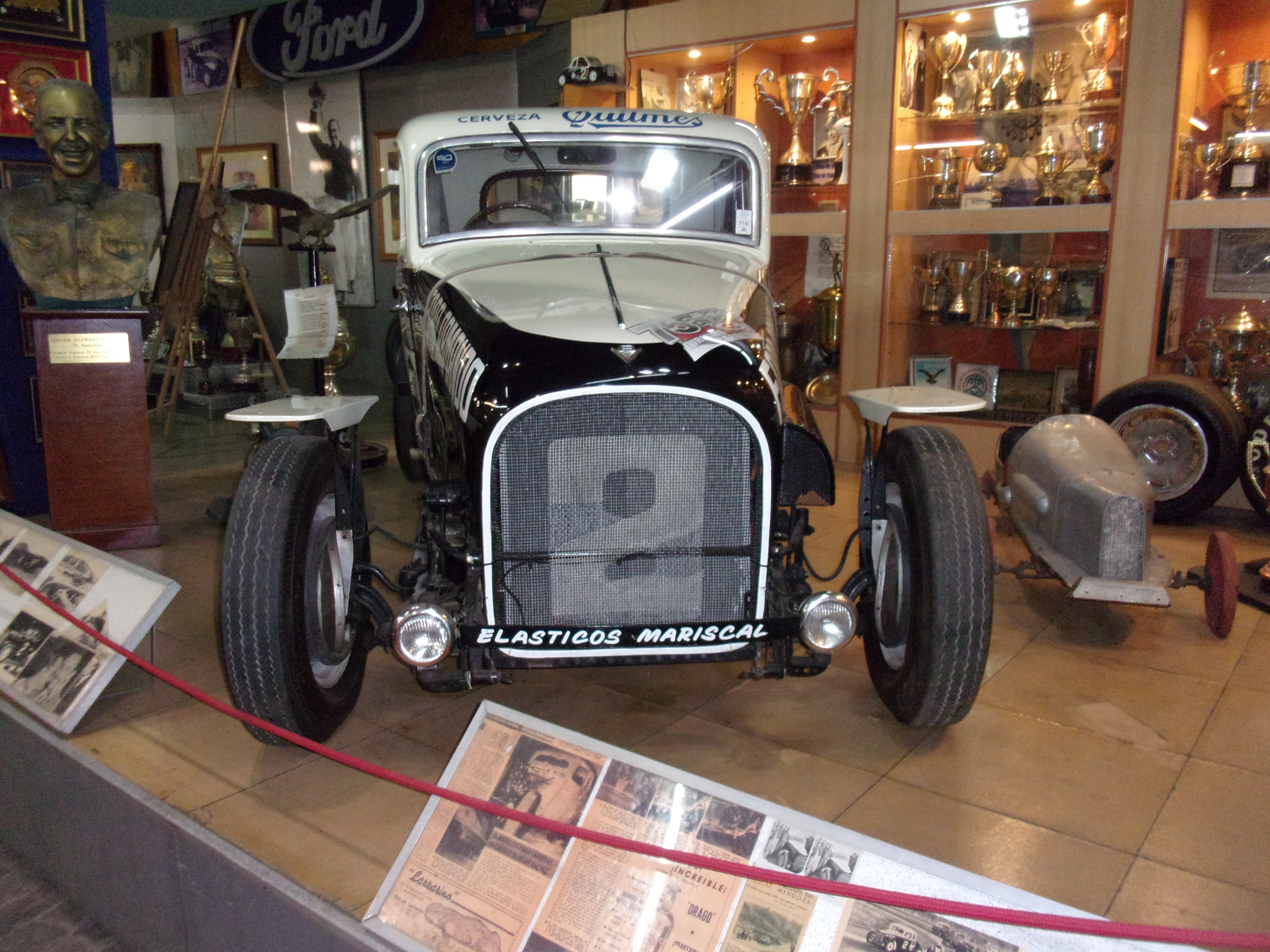

Overview
- Manufacturer: Ford
- Production: 1938–1960

Body and chassis
- Class: Torpedo/Grand tourer
- Layout: FR layout

Powertrain
- Engine: 221–239 cu in (3.62–3.92 L) Ford V8; 80–85 hp (60–63 kW) @ 3600-3800 rpm (naturally-aspirated); 150 lb⋅ft (200 N⋅m) of torque
- Transmission: 4-speed manual

The Ford Cupé V-8, also known simply as the Ford V-8, is a series of various custom-built race cars, designed, developed and built by various people between 1938 and 1960, in the lines of the "Cupecita" (small coupe) for "TC" (Turismo Carretera, Argentinian to South America category) (it followed the "Cafetera" (coffee machine) category, which used models like Ford Model A and other Tudors and Fordors, and was followed by the "Liebre" (hare) which used more modern cars such as the IKA Torino, Chevrolet Opala, Ford Falcon and not very commonly the Dodge GTX). Such cars were raced by the drivers of the likes of Juan Manuel Fangio, Pablo Birger, Oscar Alfredo Gálvez, Francisco de Ridder, Carlo Tomasi, and Bartolomé "Loco Bartolo" Ortiz, to name a few. They were commonly powered by Ford flathead V-8s, but sometimes they used later Ford F1 pickup's engines. They were based on a few different classic Ford models, including the De Luxe, the 1932 Ford, the Model 48, and the 1937 Ford. The Fords were some of the most popular cars in TC, while there were some pilots who preferred Chevrolets (like the Master or the Fleetline), others Dodge, and some others the Chilean made DiVolvo cars (such as the PV544 due to its reliability and speed).
