= Lola T210 =

Group 6 sports prototype race cars

Lola T210 Lola T212
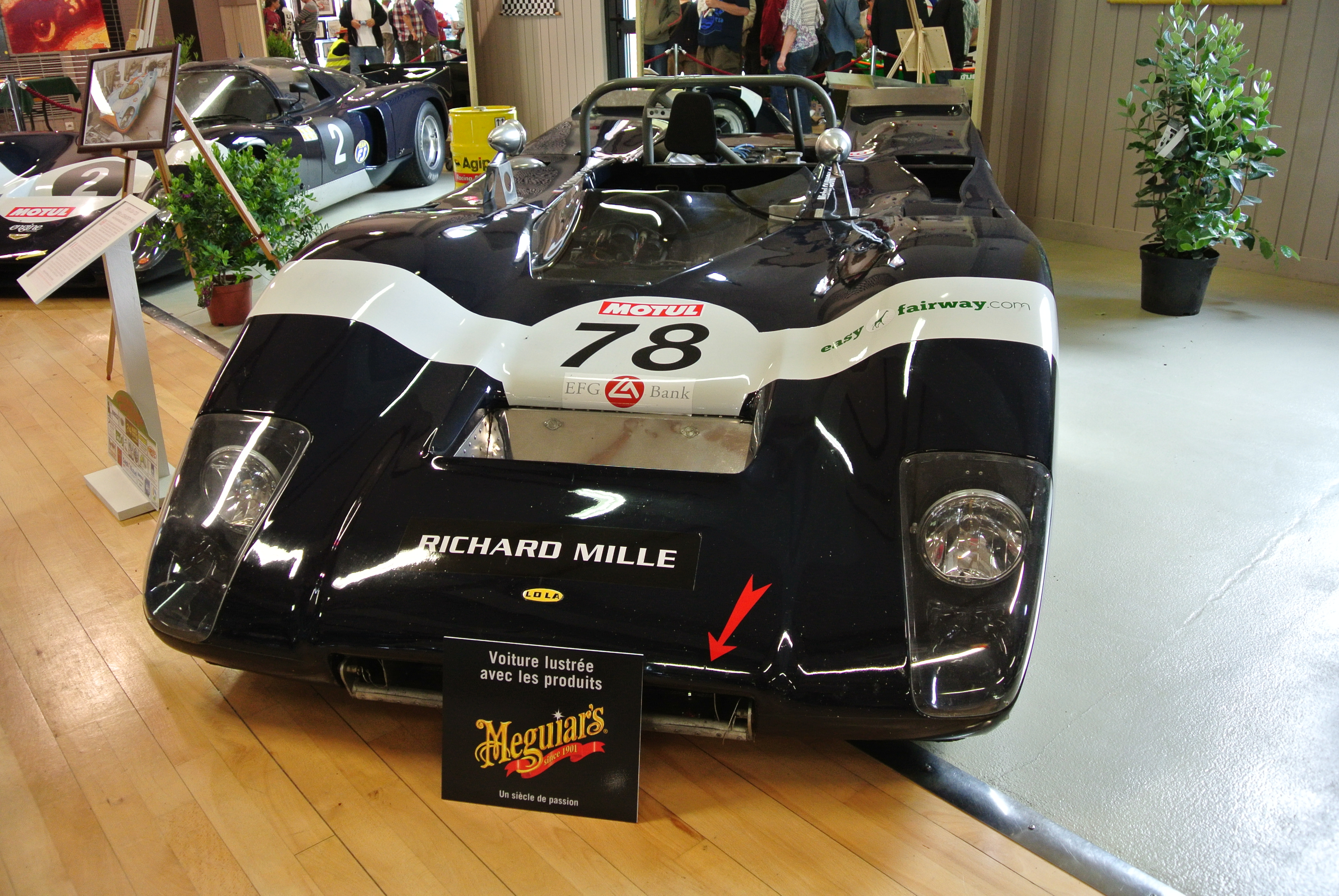
- Category: Group 6 prototype
- Constructor: Lola
- Designer(s): Eric Broadley
- Predecessor: Lola T120
- Successor: Lola T280

Technical specifications
- Chassis: Aluminum monocoque with rear subframe, fiberglass body
- Suspension (front): Double wishbones, coil springs over shock absorbers, anti-roll bar
- Suspension (rear): Twin lower links, single top links, trailing arms, coil springs over dampers, anti-roll bar
- Length: 3,450 mm (135.8 in)
- Width: 1,670 mm (65.7 in)
- Axle track: 1,320 mm (52.0 in) (Front); 1,320 mm (52.0 in) (Rear)
- Wheelbase: 2,155 mm (84.8 in)
- Engine: Ford-Cosworth FVC 1.8 L (109.8 cu in) I4 Naturally-aspirated Mid-engined
- Transmission: Hewland 5-speed manual
- Power: 245 hp (183 kW) @ 9000 rpm
- Weight: 550 kg (1,212.5 lb)

Competition history

The Lola T210, and its evolution, the Lola T212, are Group 6 sports prototype race cars, designed, developed and built by British manufacturer Lola, for the newly created European 2-Litre sports car racing championship, in 1970.

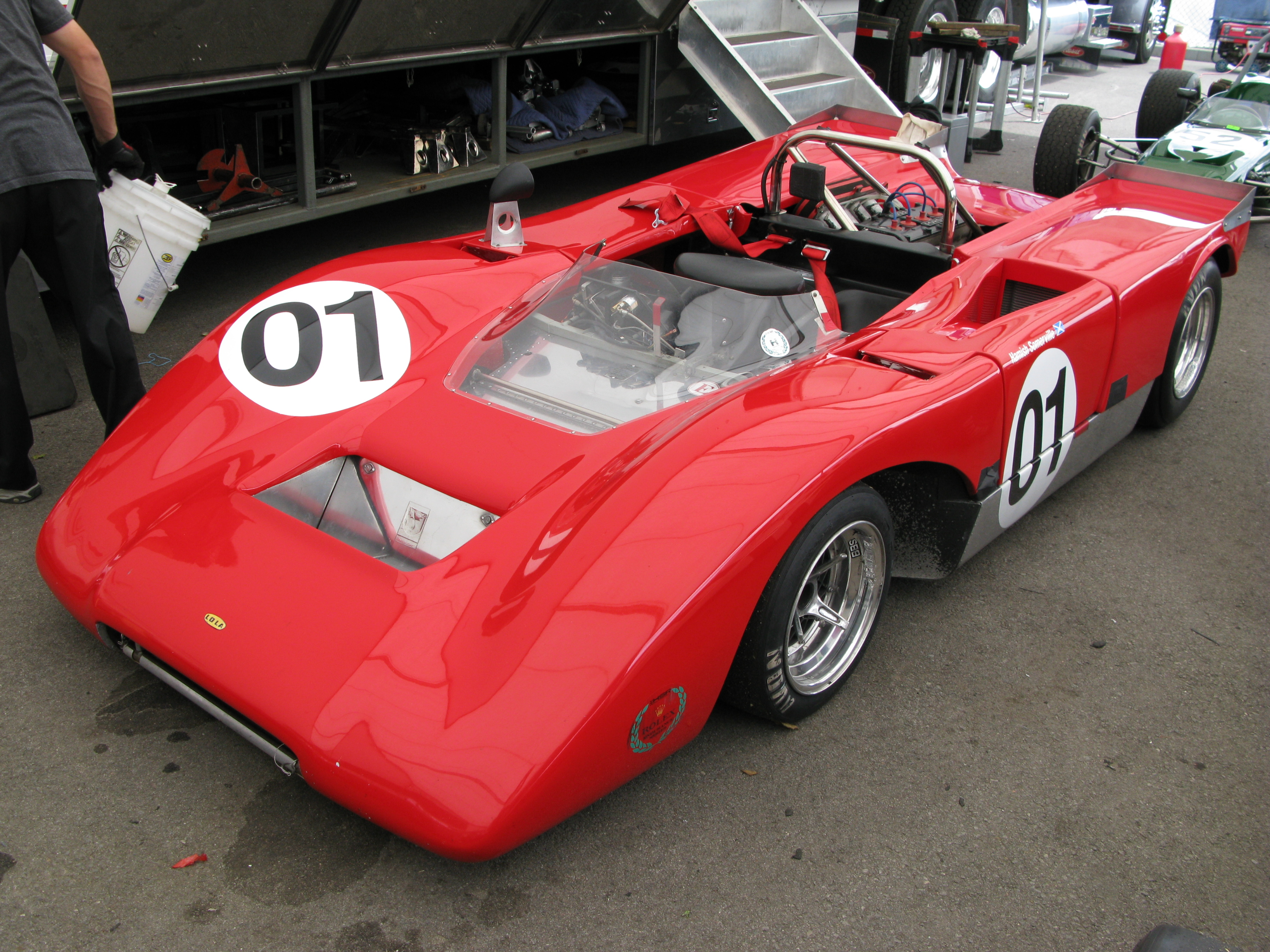
Lola T212 at Mont-Tremblant in 2009

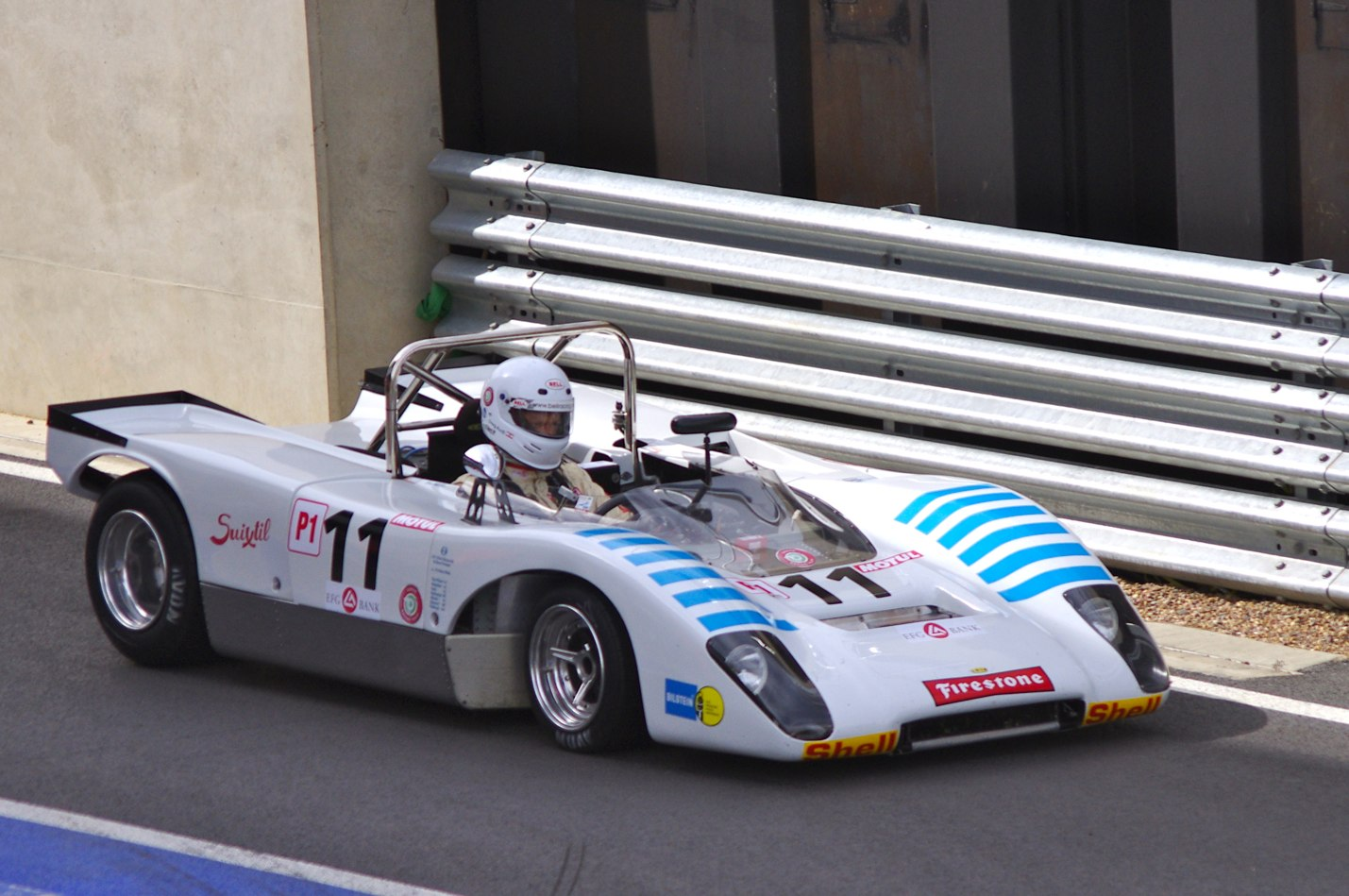
Lola T212 at Mont-Tremblant in 2011

== History ==
The body and bodywork were made of aluminum, with a double wishbone suspension at the front directly connected to the monocoque. The car's rear had a steel frame to house the engine, gearbox, and suspension.

Pushing the car was the 1.8-liter Cosworth FVC which had half the engine block derived from that of the Cosworth DFV and developed 180 kW (245 hp). Lola produced a total of 16 chassis, most of which were sold to private stables.

The T210 in 139 races between 1970 and 1975, achieved 29 overall and seven class victories. The T210 made its debut at the Paul Ricard 300 km in 1970, the first race of the European sports car championship, led by Jo Bonnier, who finished the race in second place overall three laps behind winner Brian Redman in a Chevron B16. Jo Bonnier also took his first race win for T210, winning Silverstone International in 1970. At the end of the season, Bonnier won the first edition of the European Sports Car Championship with two T210s.

A large number of pilots drove the T210. Among these was Ronnie Peterson who drove her to the Interserie in 1970, Mike Hailwood, David Hobbs, Karl von Wendt, Willi Kauhsen, and Emerson Fittipaldi. Claude Swietlik in a T210 won the French sports car championship in 1971, while Alain de Cadenet had a severe accident at the Targa Florio in 1971.

The last T210 victory was achieved by the Portuguese Jorge Pego in 1975 in a race in Moçâmedes, Angola.
