= Lola T280 =

Sports prototype race car

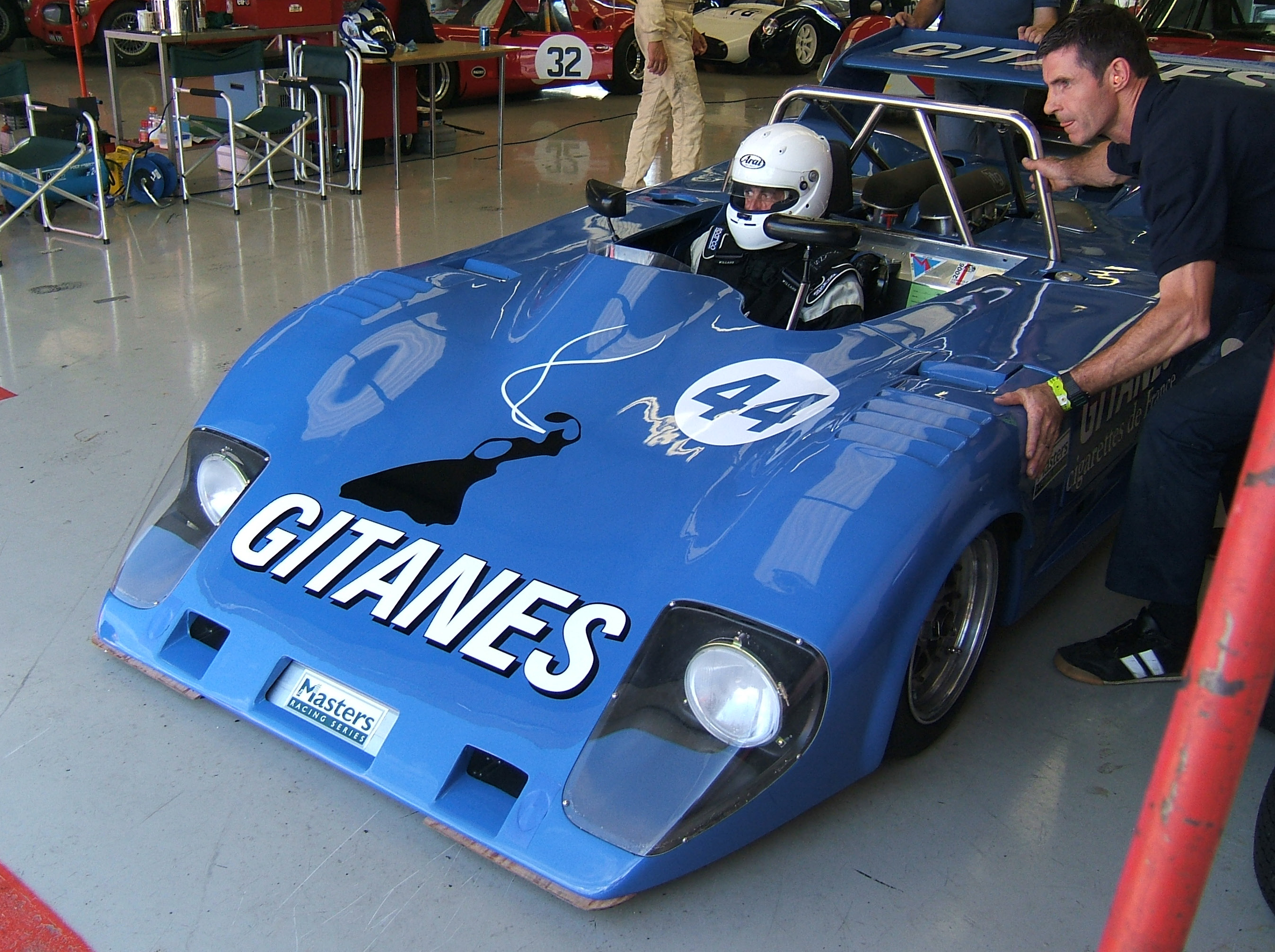
- Category: Group 5 (later Group 6)
- Constructor: Lola
- Designers: Eric Broadley; John Barnard; Patrick Head
- Predecessor: Lola T210
- Successor: Lola T290

Technical specifications
- Chassis: Glass-fiber reinforced plastic panels bodywork, aluminum monocoque
- Suspension (front): Double wishbones, coil springs over shock absorbers, anti-roll bar
- Suspension (rear): Reversed lower wishbones, top links, twin trailing arms, coil springs over shock absorbers, anti-roll bar
- Length: 4,450 mm (175.2 in)
- Width: 1,950 mm (76.8 in)
- Height: 930 mm (36.6 in)
- Axle track: 1,346 mm (53.0 in) (Front); 1,346 mm (53.0 in) (Rear)
- Wheelbase: 2,336 mm (92.0 in)
- Engine: Ford-Cosworth DFV 3.0 L (183.1 cu in) V8 naturally-aspirated Mid-engined
- Transmission: Hewland 5-speed manual
- Power: 445 hp (332 kW)
- Weight: 660–700 kg (1,455–1,543 lb)

Competition history
- Debut: 1972 1000 km Buenos Aires

The Lola T280, and its evolutions, the Lola T282, Lola T284, and Lola T286, are a series of 3-liter Group 5 (and later Group 6) sports prototype race cars, designed by Eric Broadley, John Barnard, and Patrick Head, and developed and built by British manufacturer and constructor Lola, for World Sportscar Championship sports car racing, between 1972 and 1976.

== Background ==
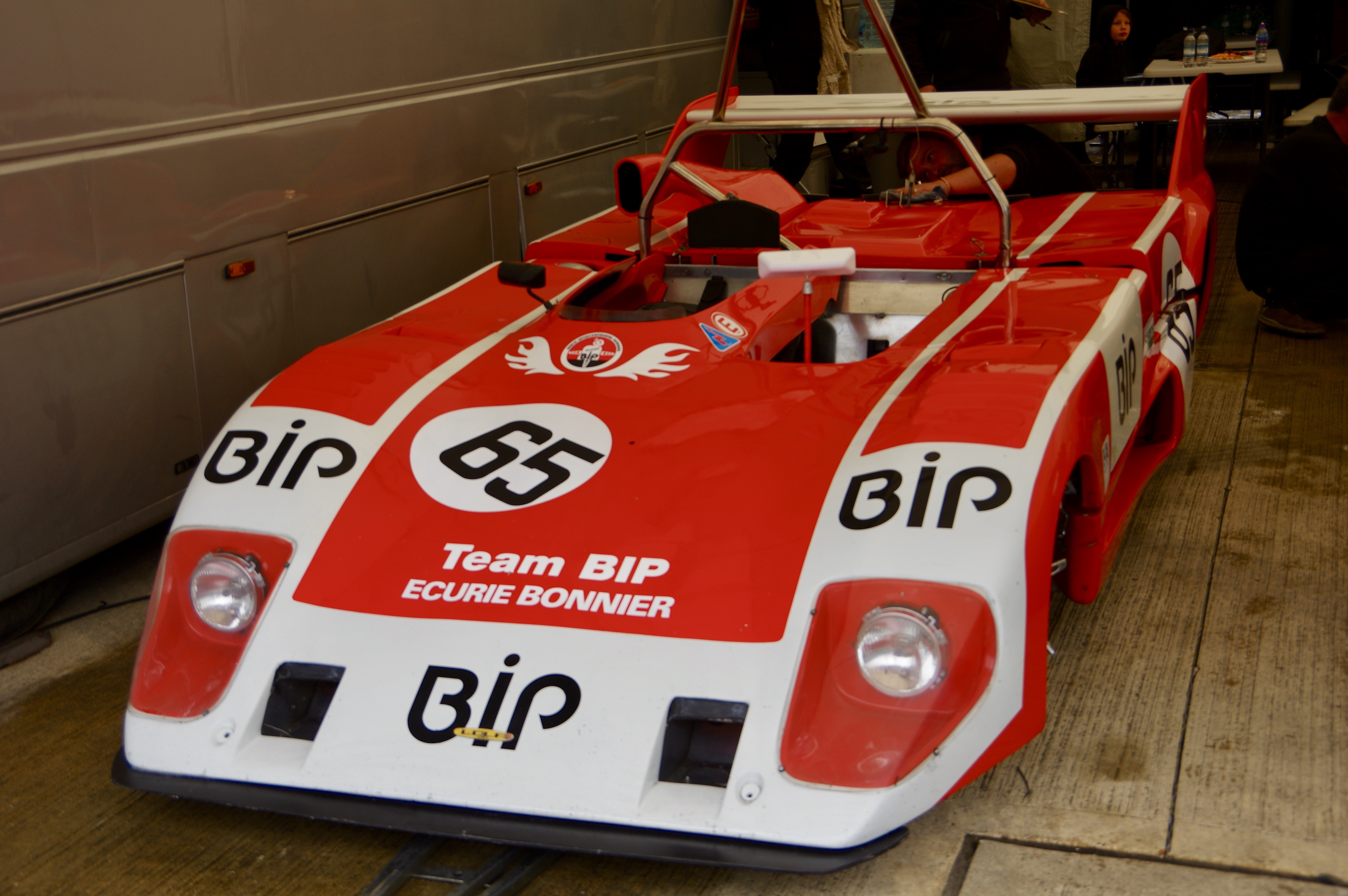
Lola T280 on display

A new regulatory change that would come into force for the 1972 season put Lola back in a position to offer its customers a car with which to face the competition serenely. In fact, Group 6 (which included prototype cars from 1968, with an engine limited to three liters of displacement) was merged with Group 5, which from 1968 included the "Sport Cars" produced in at least 25 units, and so there was a new Group 5 which included the "Prototypes of Sports Cars" (official name: Prototype-Sports Cars) with an engine capacity limit of 3,000 cm^{3}, minimum weight increased to 650 kg and no minimum number of specimens. This decision was also dictated by the intent to slow down the cars, given the performance of the best sports cars in the 1970-71 two-year period, in particular, the Porsche 917 and the Ferrari 512S and 512M. The new sports-prototype cars, which were often old Group 6 adapted to the new regulations, participated in the newborn World Makes Championship using engines derived from those of Formula 1, such as the Ford Cosworth DFV which allowed the cars driven by it to compete well and was available for private stables.

== Design ==
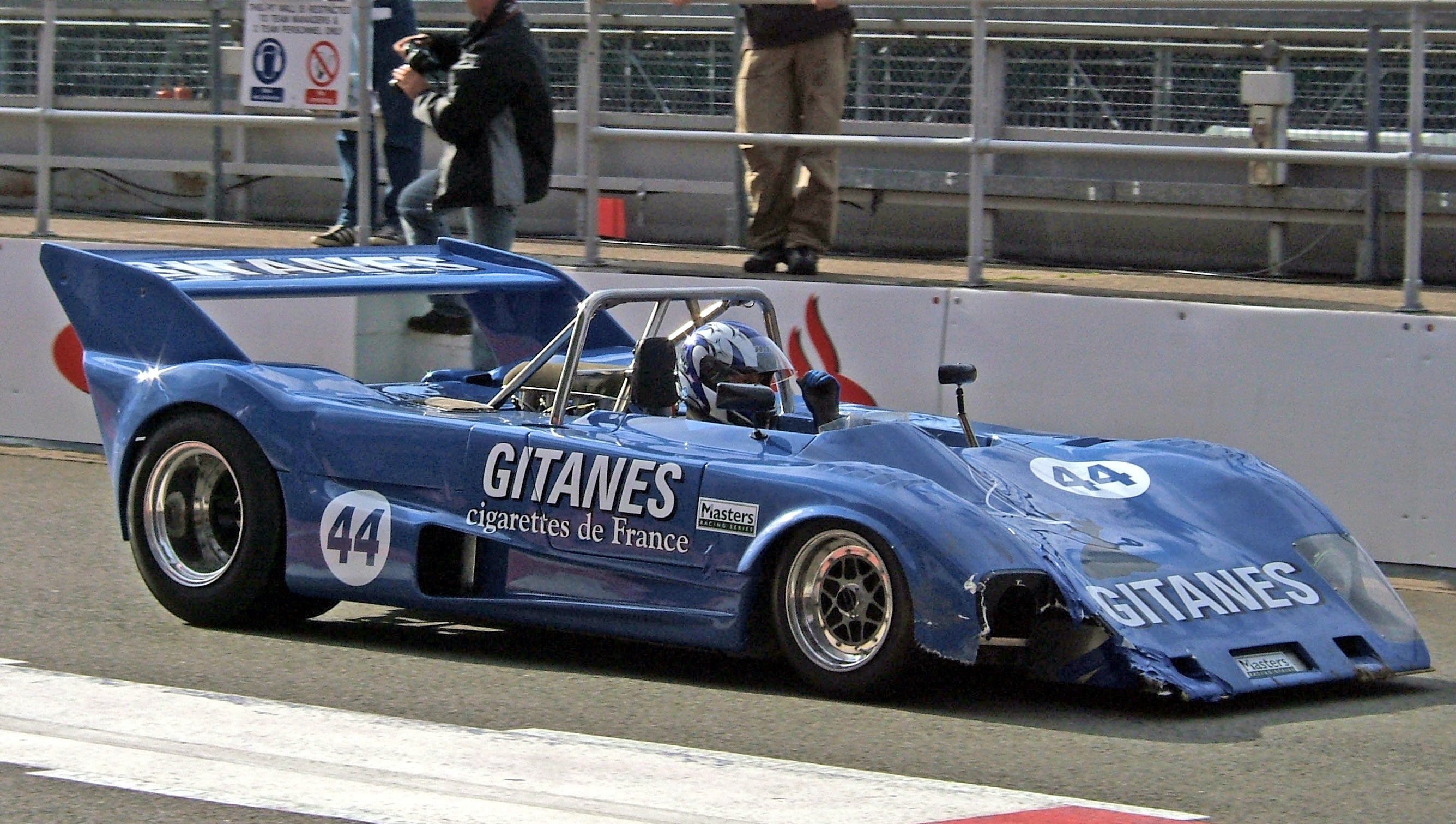
Lola T282

Logically, the biggest difference between the T280 and the T290 lay in the engine, which in the three-liter served as a structural element, as in many of his contemporaries' Formula 1 single-seaters, while in the two-liter there was an additional subframe on which the suspensions were mounted, given the lower structural rigidity of the small four-cylinder in-line engines generally used in the lower class. Furthermore, the T280 required the assembly of the rear brake discs at the differential output instead of on the wheel hubs in order to be able to mount the wider wheels necessary to unload to the ground the greater power of the larger engine, which were mounted on rims size unsuitable to accommodate brake discs. For both cars, the suspensions were rather conventional, with deformable wishbones at the front and rear, where there were also upper longitudinal arms.

== Variants ==
The following season the T282 and T292 were presented, which saw improvements in aerodynamics, with a sharper nose and a full-width rear wing: only one three-liter model of the T282 was produced (purchased by Scuderia Filipinetti with the sponsorship of the Gitanes), and while further four examples were made later (called T286 - 1976/77) which incorporated the aerodynamic modifications conceived for the two-liter cars derived from the T290, while in the meantime the spare parts of the second Ecurie Bonnier car - chassis No.HU02, which was destroyed in the 1972 Jo Bonnier accident - was assembled by the Swiss tuner Heini Mader for his compatriot Heinz Schulthess to create a car called T284 and competed starting from the 1974 season.

== Race results ==
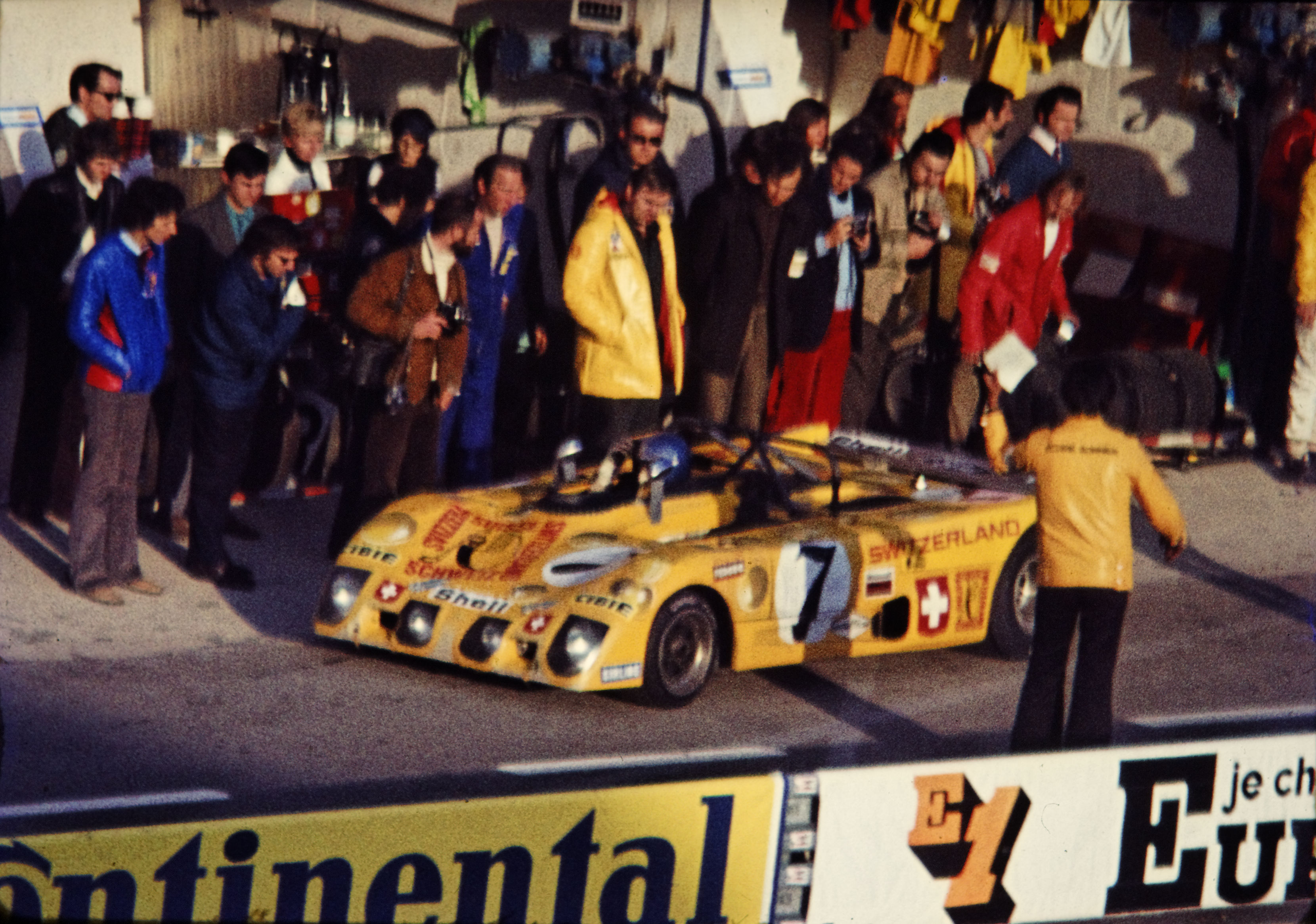
T280 at Le Mans in 1972

In 1972, two chassis were entered for the first time in competition during the 1,000 kilometers of Buenos Aires.

Two Lola T280-Cosworth DFVs were set up by the Ecurie Bonnier of the driver Jo Bonnier for the 1972 season of the Marche world championship, where they faced competition from the official teams of Ferrari, Alfa Romeo, and Matra, to which were added the Mirage M6 of the JWAE, also pushed 'they from the Ford Cosworth DFV, which proved to be an engine with destructive vibrations for itself and for the cars that mounted it. Victory at the 4 Hours of Le Mans in March 1972 showed the potential of the T280 in view of the most prestigious 24 Hours to be held in June, where Jo Bonnier himself was involved in a fatal accident in the morning, during a dubbing phase while he was in third position.
