= List of 24 Hours of Le Mans fatalities =

22 drivers have died while competing in the 24 Hours of Le Mans, held at Circuit de la Sarthe, half of which occurred at the Mulsanne Straight.

This is a list of 24 Hours of Le Mans fatal accidents, which consists of all the drivers who have died during a 24 Hours of Le Mans weekend, or in pre-race testing or practice sessions in preparation of the event. It does not include track marshals and spectators or other race attendees, including the 1955 disaster which claimed the lives of 81 spectators. In all, a total of 22 drivers have died in and around the Circuit de la Sarthe, with more than half occurring along the circuit's Mulsanne Straight. Sixteen during the race itself, five during pre-race practice and testing sessions, and one en route to the race.

André Guilbert was the first driver to die in June 1925 during the race's third year, although this was due to a collision with a van while en route to the race, but is classified by race historians and authors of the official yearbooks, Christian Moity and Jean-Marc Teissedre. Marius Mestivier was the first race fatality, occurring only a few hours after Guilbert's death. The most recent death is Allan Simonsen, who died in the race of 2013. In total, two drivers died in the 1920s, another two in the 1930s, one in the 1940s, five in the 1950s, six in the 1960s, two in the 1970s, two in the 1980s, one in the 1990s, none in the 2000s, and one in the 2010s.

== By year ==
| Driver | Date | Car | Entrant | Section | During |
|---|---|---|---|---|---|
| (France) André Guilbert | 19 June, 1925 | Ravel 12 CV Sport | (France) Automobiles Ravel SA | Mulsanne Straight | Road accident |
Guilbert was making his way to the circuit during the morning of the race in his Ravel, a car designed by Louis Ravel, the brother of the composer Maurice Ravel. His car was struck head-on by a van traveling at high speed on the wrong side of the road. Both vehicles had to be dragged away in order to clear the road. The van driver only suffered slight injuries, while Guilbert died a few hours later from his injuries.
| (France) Marius Mestivier | 20 June, 1925 | Amilcar Works Racing Car, CGS-based, special engine mounted into a modified chassis with a 2-seat 'coupe' style body. | (France) Société Nouvelle de l'Automobile Amilcar | Mulsanne Straight | Race |
At 8 pm, Mestivier's Amilcar spun on the Mulsanne on his eighteenth lap of the race. The car suddenly swerved off the road and plunged head first into a ditch, killing him instantly. An early report claimed a blown tire or brake lock caused the crash, but many sources later claimed that he was struck by a flying bird, knocking him out.
| (France) Marcel Michelot | 13 June, 1927 | GM GC2 | (France) Automobiles Gendron & Cie | Arnage | Practice |
During late night practice, a week before the race, Michelot went out to test one of the cars during the night following a meal at the Hunaudières restaurant. He lost control of the car three hours later in the early morning whilst approaching the Arnage esses and veered off the track on the left side and collided with an oak tree, killing the driver almost instantly with massive head and chest injuries. The accident reportedly occurred in heavy fog.
| (United Kingdom) (South Africa) Pat Fairfield | 19 June, 1937 | Frazer Nash BMW 328 | (United Kingdom) David Murray | Maison Blanche | Race |
| (France) René Kippeurth ("Rekip") | 19 June, 1937 | Bugatti Type 44 | (France) René Kippeurth | Maison Blanche | Race |
Amateur driver Kippeurth lost control of his Bugatti at the Maison Blanche ("White House") corner in the opening laps of the event, hitting an earth bank and throwing him from the car. While other cars wrecked or swerved to avoid Kippuerth's body, Fairfield struck the wreckage of the Bugatti. Two further cars impacted Fairfield's Frazer Nash. Kippeurth died on the scene while Fairfield died undergoing an operation in the hospital.
| (France) Pierre Maréchal | 27 June, 1949 | Aston Martin DB2 | (United Kingdom) Mrs R. P. Hichens | Arnage | Race |
At Arnage during the final hours of the race, Maréchal's Aston Martin spun while attempting to pass another competitor. The car rolled over during the incident. Although Maréchal was taken to the hospital, he died the following day.
| (France) Jean Larivière | 23 June, 1951 | Ferrari 212 Export C | (Belgium) Johnny Claes | Tertre Rouge | Race |
Exiting the Tertre Rouge corner, Larivière lost control of his car and launched over a sandbank along the Mulsanne Straight. The Ferrari landed in a garden beyond the road surface and Larivière was decapitated by a wire fence.
| (United States) Tom Cole Jr. | 14 June, 1953 | Ferrari 340 MM Vignale | (United States) Luigi Chinetti | Maison Blanche | Race |
Cole was killed when his Ferrari left the road, impacting one of several farm houses lining the road at Maison Blanche. Cole was thrown from the car and died at the scene.
| (France) Pierre Levegh | 11 June, 1955 | Mercedes-Benz 300 SLR | (West Germany) Daimler-Benz A.G. | Pit straight | Race |
Main article: 1955 Le Mans disaster Levegh and competitor Mike Hawthorn were running near each other at the beginning of the pit lane when Hawthorn slowed for a pit stop. Lance Macklin, who had just been lapped in his slower Austin-Healey moved across to avoid Hawthorn and Levegh ran into the back of his car. Levegh's Mercedes flipped into the air and struck the sandbank at the side of the track. Levegh was thrown from the car and killed, while burning pieces of the car were flung into the crowd and caught fire, killing at least 81 others.
| (France) Louis Héry | 28 July, 1956 | Panhard Monopole X86 | (France) Louis Héry | Maison Blanche | Race |
Even after modifications had been made to the Circuit de la Sarthe after 1955, Louis Héry was killed on his own just a year later. His Monopole flipped at Maison Blanche, trapping and killing the driver.
| (France) Jean-Marie Brussin ("Mary") | 21 June, 1958 | Jaguar D-Type | (France) Henri Peignaux | Dunlop Curve | Race |
During a downpour of rain at dusk, Brussin entered the Dunlop Curve too fast and rolled after hitting an earth bank. The car, lying on the track, was then hit by the Ferrari of Bruce Kessler. Brussin was killed in the wreck, while Kessler was burned.
| (Brazil) Christian "Bino" Heins | 15 June, 1963 | Alpine M63 – Renault | (France) Société Automobiles Alpine | Mulsanne Straight | Race |
The engine of Bruce McLaren's Aston Martin DB4 blew, causing 20 liters of oil to spill onto the track. The two cars that followed, Ninian Sanderson's AC Cobra Hardtop and Michael Salmon's Ferrari 330 LMB, were fortunate enough to be able to squeeze through, but the Jaguar E-type Lightweight of Roy Salvadori touched the oil, causing it to spin like a top and burst into flames, once it hit a bank. The René Bonnet Aérodjet LM6 of Jean-Pierre Manzon struck the Jaguar and was left sitting in the middle of the track as the Alpine of Heins closed in. He attempted to avoid the pile up, but doing so, he lost control of his car as it veered off the track, hitting a post and exploding into a fireball, killing him instantly. Manzon and Salvadori were injured from the resulting incident.
| (United States) Lloyd "Lucky" Casner | 10 April, 1965 | Maserati Tipo 151/3 | (United States) Camoradi Racing Team | Mulsanne Straight | Testing |
As the car was thrown off balance over the hump on the Mulsanne Straight, the Maserati swerved off onto the grass, causing it to roll over twice and land in a ditch on the right-hand side of the road. Casner was thrown clear on the first somersault and was taken to the local hospital, where he later died from head injuries without regaining consciousness.
| (United States) Walt Hansgen | 7 April, 1966 | Ford GT40 Mk II | (United States) Shelby American | | Testing |
During preliminary tests on a wet track on Saturday morning, April 2, 1966, he lost control and drove down an escape road. He was not aware that a barrier had been placed across the escape lane and he crashed heavily. Five days after his accident, Hansgen died in the American military hospital of Orléans, France, where he had been admitted.
| (France) Roby Weber | 9 April, 1967 | Matra MS630 – BRM | (France) Equipe Matra Sports | Mulsanne Straight | Practice |
During the closing period of the preliminary practice session, Weber took an unscheduled lap of the circuit. Entering the straight, his Matra veered off the inside of the track and exploded into flames.
| (Belgium) Lucien Bianchi | 30 March, 1969 | Alfa Romeo 33/3 | (Italy) Autodelta SpA | Tertre Rouge | Testing |
Bianchi decided to start early as organisers were speculating a wet session later in the day. As his Alfa Romeo went through the Mulsanne hump slowly with its right indicator showing, it suffered a mechanical failure, the car suddenly started zigzagging and struck the telegraph pole on the left, killing Bianchi instantly.
| (United Kingdom) John Woolfe | 23 June, 1969 | Porsche 917 | (United Kingdom) John Woolfe Racing | Maison Blanche | Race |
Woolfe had purchased one of the new and high-powered Porsche 917s, and Porsche's own Herbert Linge was to support the Briton. Woolfe was killed in the first lap of the race at the fast Maison Blanche corners, when he was thrown out of the car because he had not fastened his seat belts due to the traditional Le Mans start procedure. The procedure was abolished the next year.
| (Sweden) Jo Bonnier | 11 June, 1972 | Lola T280 – Ford Cosworth | Ecurie Bonnier Switzerland | RD140 (between Mulsanne and Indianapolis) | Race |
On Sunday morning, Bonnier approached the Indianapolis bend before Arnage and tried to avoid the slowly driven Ferrari 365GTB4 #35 of Florian Vetsch. The cars touched, Bonnier's was launched over the barriers and ended up in the trees. The Lola was completely destroyed and Bonnier was killed upon impact.
| (France) André Haller | 12 June, 1976 | Datsun 260Z | (Switzerland) Sion Autos 2001 | Mulsanne kink | Race |
During the first lap of Haller's stint (and his second participation) at 9 pm, his Datsun skidded entering the Mulsanne kink. The car slid and spun several times before entering the grass verges of the track, struck a guard rail and caught fire. Haller was rescued, but died later in a hospital from chest injuries.
| (France) Jean-Louis Lafosse | 13 June, 1981 | Rondeau M379C – Cosworth | (France) Jean Rondeau | Mulsanne Straight | Race |
Near the end of his driving stint and half an hour after the green flag came out, the Rondeau of Lafosse, who was lying in seventh place at 5:03 pm, was approaching the Lola T600 of Guy Edwards, Emilio de Villota and Juan Fernández. Suddenly, just before the restaurants area of the main straight, as Lafosse changed into fifth gear, the car veered to the right, striking into a guard rail before a marshalling post, killing Lafosse instantly and injuring two track marshals on the post. The car bounced back toward the other side of the track and then rested in the middle-left side of the track with Lafosse seen fully exposed out of the car. Prior to the crash, the car was involved in a previous incident with partial damage to the front bodywork, as photographic evidence shows. There had been claims that when Lafosse attempted to make up for lost time, either suspension or tyre failure caused the car to veer off suddenly into the barrier.
| (Austria) Jo Gartner | 1 June, 1986 | Porsche 962C | (West Germany) Kremer Racing | Mulsanne Straight | Race |
At 2:10 am on Sunday, Gartner's Porsche suffered from a mechanical failure, causing it to swerve to the left and strike the barrier headfirst at 160 mph (260 km/h). The car scaled the barrier and sheared through a post, before being flung back onto the road and turning over as it hit the right hand guard rail. The car caught fire as it rested on the barriers. Gartner died instantly from neck injuries.
| (France) Sébastien Enjolras | 3 May, 1997 | WR LM97 – Peugeot | (France) Welter Racing | Arnage | Pre-qualifying |
At 12:40 pm, part of the rear bodywork of Enjolras's WM came loose at Arnage, causing the car to go airborne over the safety barriers. The car overturned and exploded in flames following impact, killing Enjolras instantly. The accident caused Welter Racing to withdraw its entries and the one-piece body shell was banned.
| (Denmark) Allan Simonsen | 22 June, 2013 | Aston Martin Vantage GTE | (United Kingdom) Aston Martin Racing | Tertre Rouge and Mulsanne Straight | Race |
Just ten minutes into the race, Simonsen spun off the kerbs and into the Armco barrier on the exit of Tertre Rouge where it joined RD 338 (Mulsanne Straight). The car bounced back onto the track and came to rest. The force of the impact crushed part of the roof and supporting rollcage. Simonsen was treated on the scene by recovery crews and was transferred to the circuit's medical centre, where he later died of his injuries. A large tree behind the Armco has been considered to be an integral part of the impact, causing an aortal separation in the driver's chest. Tertre Rouge was moved about 200 m and new tyre barriers were installed at the exit in 2014.
