= Willi Kauhsen =

German racing driver

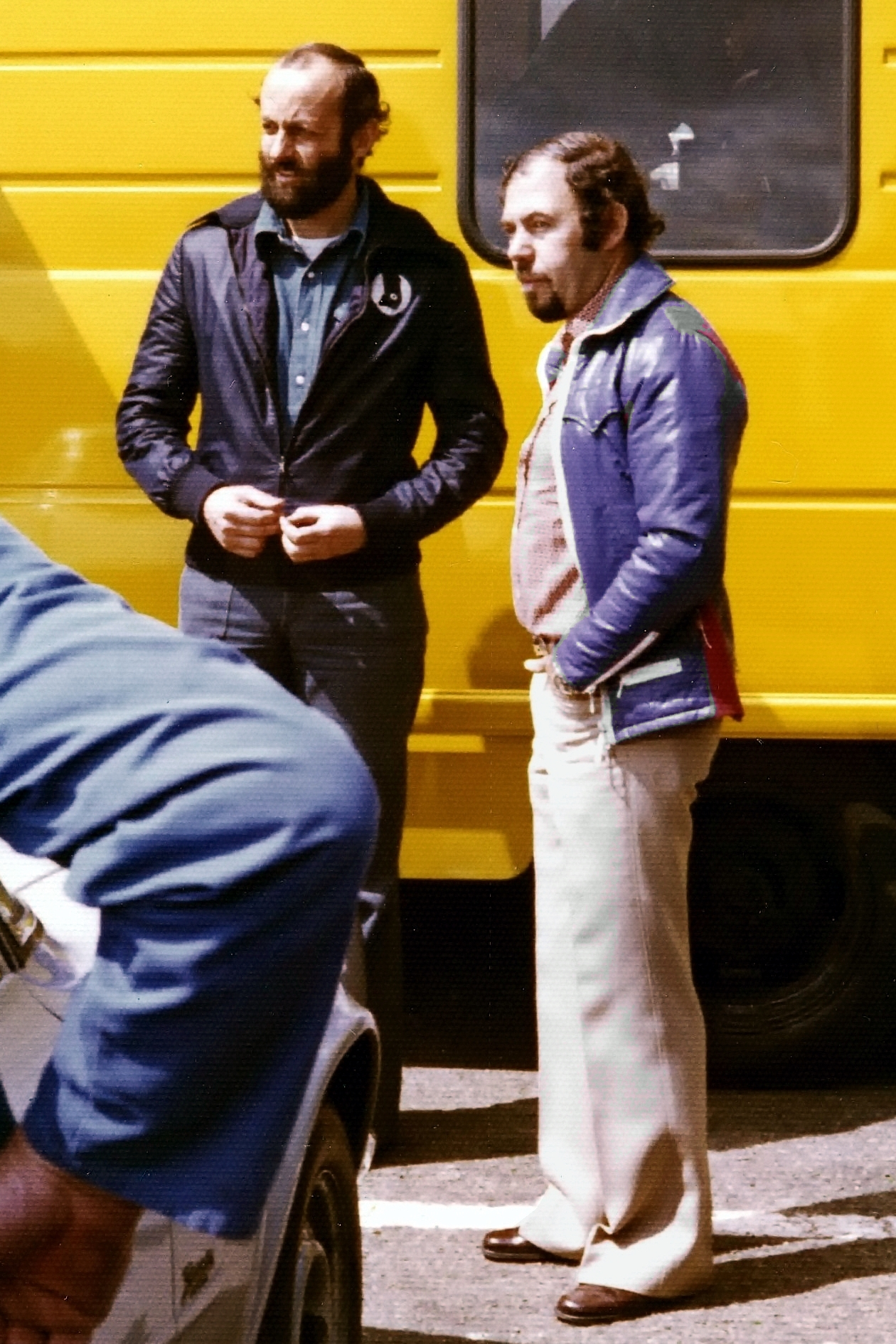
- Willi Kauhsen on the right, Henri Pescarolo on the left at Circuit de Spa-Francorchamps in 1975
- Nationality: (Germany) German

24 Hours of Le Mans career
- Years: 1969, 1970, 1971
- Teams: Porsche System Engineering, Martini Racing
- Best finish: 2nd (1970)
- Class wins: 0

Willibert "Willi" Kauhsen (born 19 May 1939) is a German former racing driver and racing team owner from Eschweiler in Aachen, Germany.

== Driving career ==
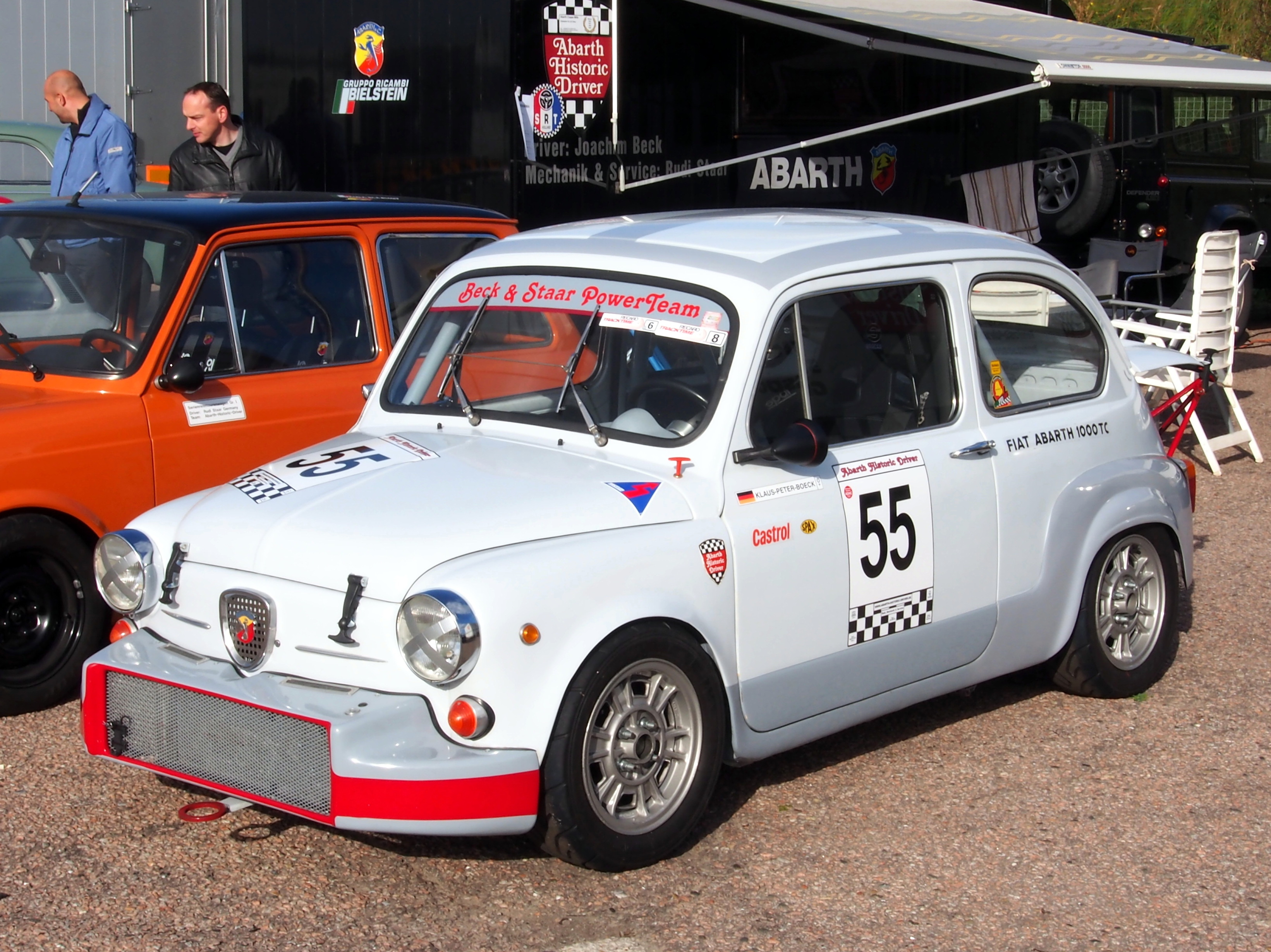
Abarth 1000TC

Kauhsen was a freight forwarder who went into racing in the 1960s. He regularly participated in touring and sports car races in the period 1963-1974. He became a European Touring Car Championship winner driving an Abarth 1000TC in 1967. He became a Porsche factory driver and won the 84-hour-long Marathon de la Route in 1968 on a 170 hp Porsche 911S shared with Herbert Linge and Dieter Glemser. He also won Spa-Francorchamps 24 Hours in the same year, with Erwin Kremer and Helmut Kelleners. In the late 1960s, he was a regular in long distance races.

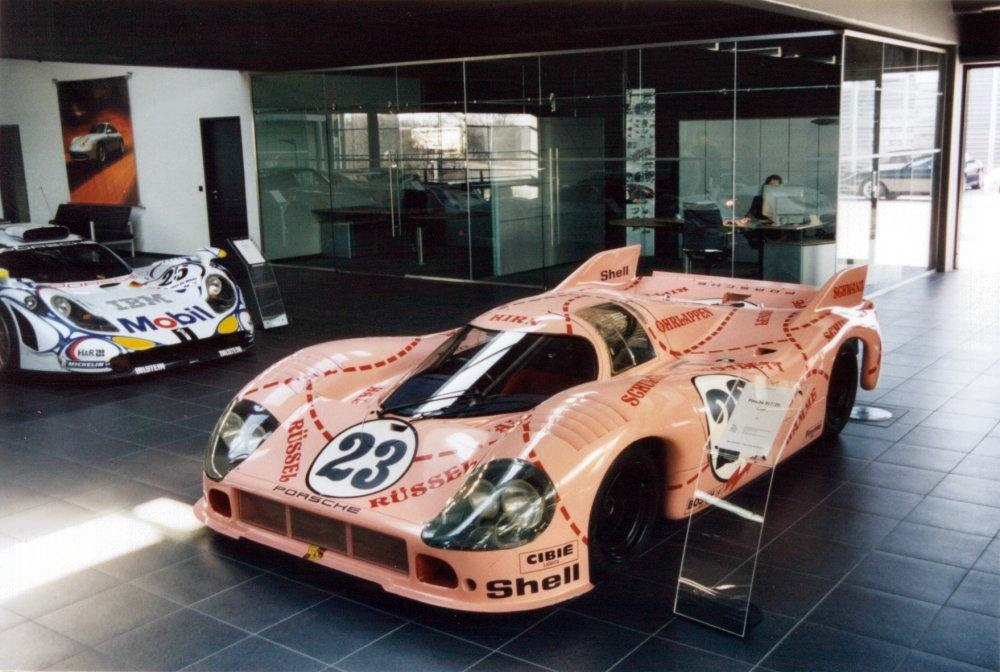
1971 Porsche 917/20 "Pink Pig" driven by Willi Kauhsen and Reinhold Jöst for Martini Racing in 1971 24 Hours of Le Mans

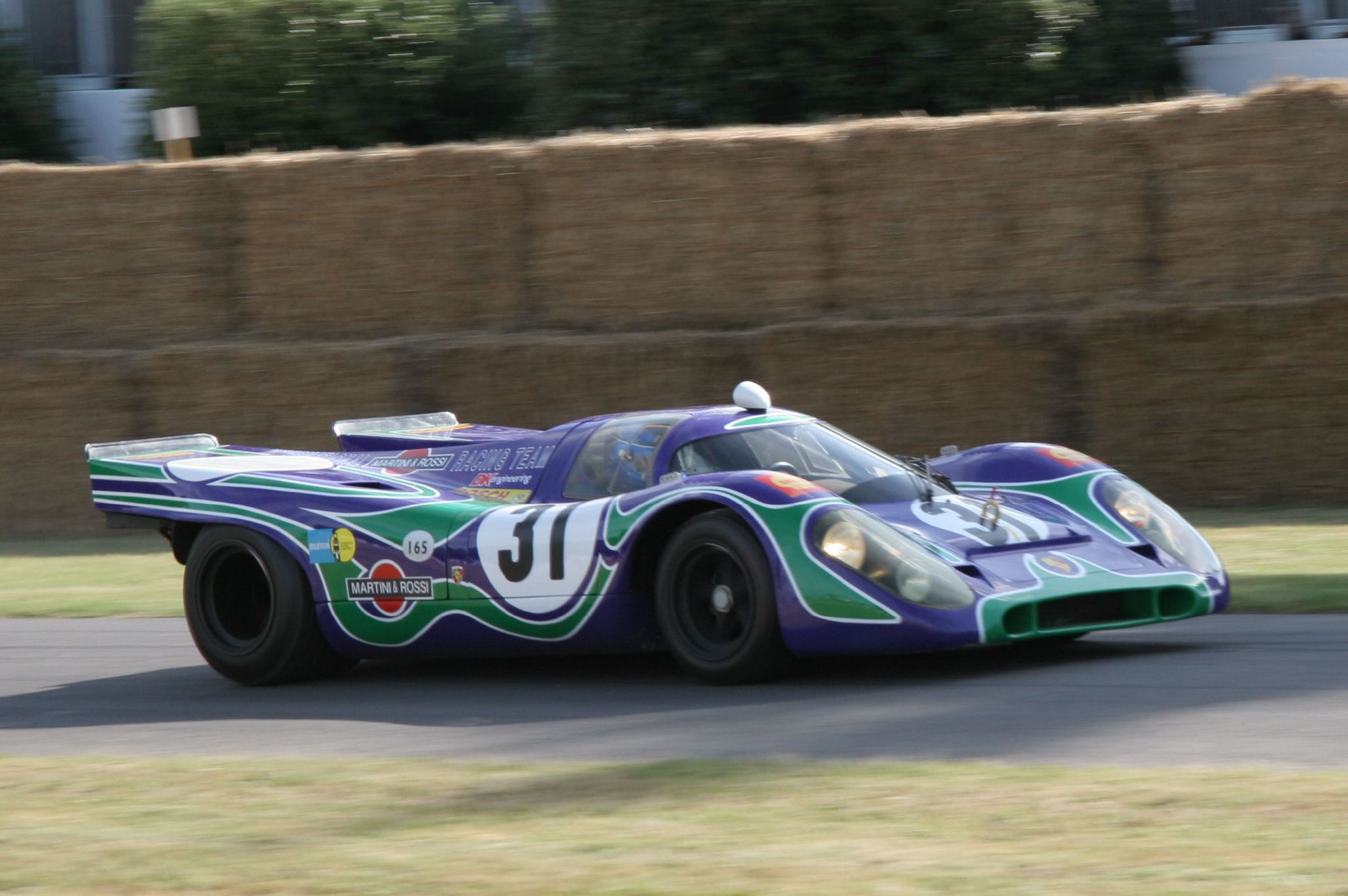
Porsche 917KH in the livery of 917LH "Hippie Car" as driven by Willi Kauhsen and Gérard Larrousse in 1970 24 Hours of Le Mans

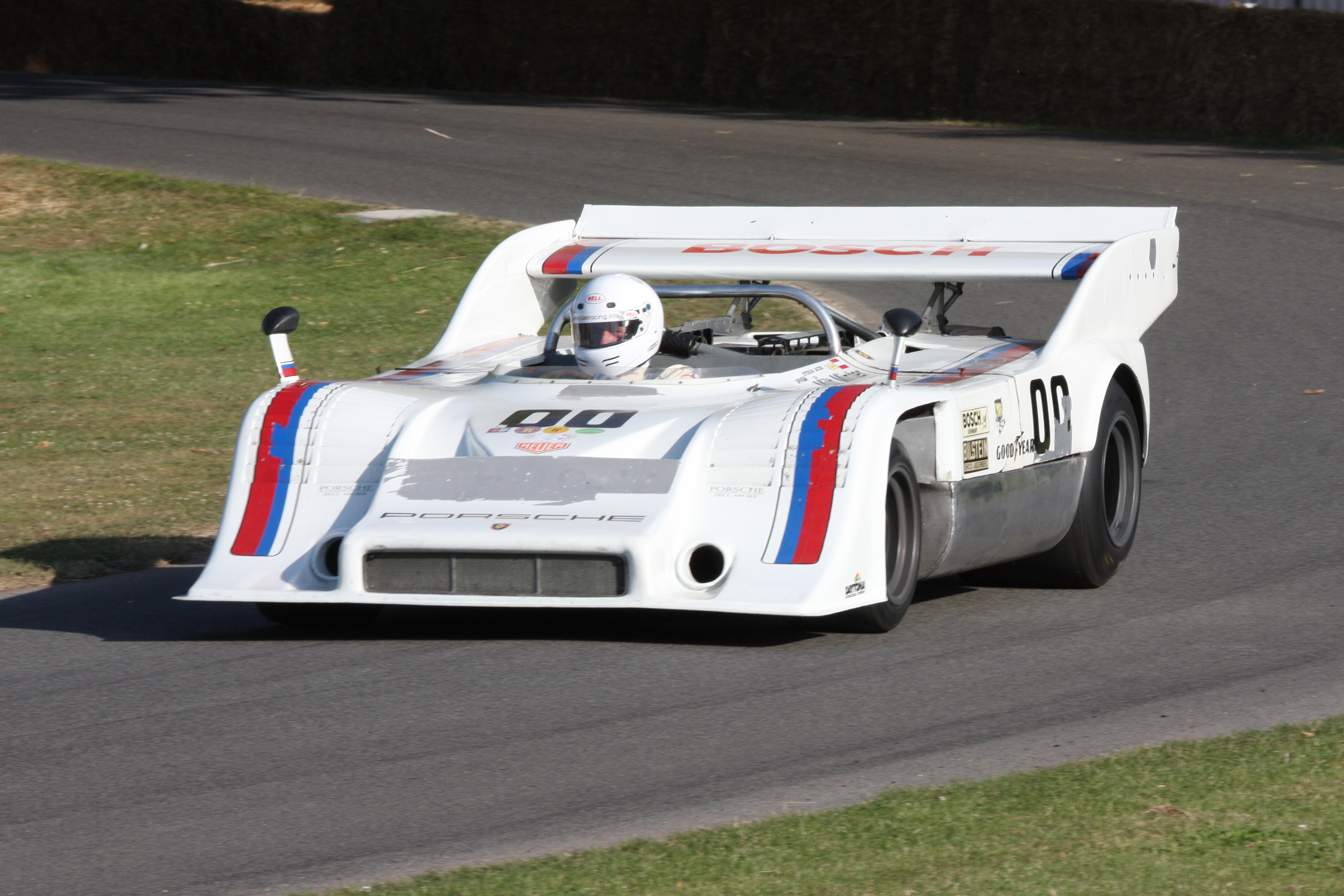
1972 Porsche 917/10

Kauhsen drove a Porsche 908L with Rudi Lins for Porsche System Engineering (Porsche factory team) in 1969 24 Hours of Le Mans and retired after 317 laps.

In 1970, Kauhsen drove a Porsche 917LH for Martini Racing with Gérard Larrousse at Le Mans, which finished second with 338 laps, five laps behind the winning 917KH of Hans Herrmann and Richard Attwood. For 1971 24 Hours of Le Mans, he co-drove the famous Porsche 917/20 "Pink Pig" with Reinhold Joest, but failed to finish.

Kauhsen started his own team, Willi Kauhsen Racing Team, for the 1972 season to participate in Interserie and Can-Am as a driver. In 1971, Jo Siffert was popular in the Can-Am series driving a Group 7 Porsche 917/10, and Porsche competition director Rico Steinemann decided to update this car into 1972 spec. for Willi Kauhsen to drive, which produced 1000 hp on the dyno, 900 hp in racing trim with twin turbo chargers. He won the Imola Interserie event in 1972, and finished second in Zeltweg, Norisring, Keimola and Hockenheim in the series.

This car's Can-Am debut was at the eighth round (of nine total) at Laguna Seca in 1972, in which Kauhsen qualified eighth and did not finish for a turbocharger trouble. For the last round at Riverside Raceway, Kauhsen qualified ninth and finished eighth.

In 1973, Kauhsen won the first two races in Interserie at the Nürburgring and in Imola, second place at Silverstone, fourth place at Norisring, sixth at Hockenheim, fourth at Misano and fourth at Hockenheim. For Can-Am, he qualified fifth and did not finish at Mid-Ohio, which was the only appearance in 1973.

For 1974, Kauhsen won at Interserie Silverstone, entered Emerson Fittipaldi for sixth at Nürburgring, second place as the driver at Kassel Calden, 4th place at Casale, fourth at Hockenheim, and did not appear in Can-Am.

== Team ownership ==
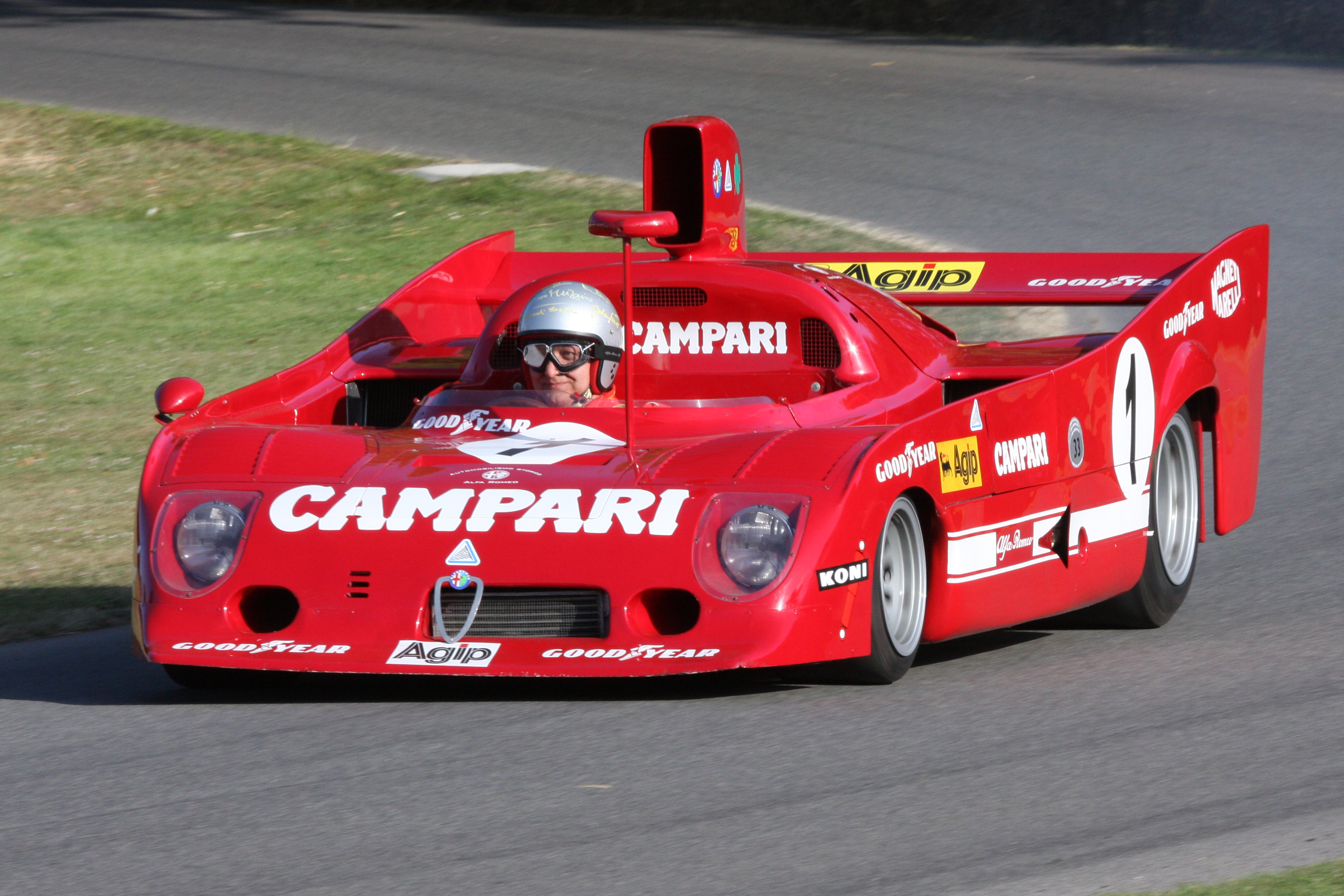
1975 Alfa Romeo Tipo 33TT12

Willi Kauhsen Racing Team gained fame in 1975 World Sportscar Championship season when it represented Alfa Romeo to become the winner of World Championship for Makes contested by Group 5 Sports Cars (2-seater racing prototypes) of under 3L displacement. Kauhsen made a deal for the team with Autodelta, who competed the previous 1974 season with Alfa Romeo 33TT12 somewhat unsuccessfully against Matra, to act as the on-track contingent for the Alfa Romeo racing division, starting with two Tipo 33TT12 for Arturo Merzario/Jacky Ickx and Henri Pescarolo/Derek Bell for the second round at Mugello on 3 March.

The #1 Merzario duo finished the 1000 km race in second place behind an Alpine-Renault A441 Turbo of Jabouille/Larrousse, and the #2 Pescarolo car finished in the fourth place behind a turbocharged 6 cylinder Porsche 908/3 of Müller/van Lennep. The team dominated the rest of the season as follows:

800 km Dijon, 5 April

Car #2 Merzario/Laffite, 1st
Car #1 Pescarolo/Bell, 4th

1000 km Monza, 20 April

Car #2 Merzario/Laffite, 1st
Car #1 Pescarolo/Bell, retired (classified 18th, oil pressure)

1000 km Spa, 4 May

Car #2 Pescarolo/Bell, 1st
Car #1 Ickx/Merzario, 2nd

1000 km Pergusa (Coppa Florio), 18 May

Car #1 Merzario/Mass, 1st
Car #2 Bell/Pescarolo, 2nd

1000 km Nürburgring, 1 June

Car #1 Merzario/Laffite, 1st
Car #3 Mass/Scheckter, 6th
Car #2 Pescarolo/Bell, retired (accident)

1000 km Zeltweg, 29 June

Car #2 Bell/Pescarolo, 1st
Car #1 Merzario/Brambilla, 2nd

6 Hours of Watkins Glen, 13 July

Car #4 Pescarolo/Bell, 1st
Car #1 Merzario/Andretti, 2nd

The team did not participate in 1975 24 Hours of Le Mans held on 14–15 June, which did not count toward World Championship for Makes due to the conflict between FIA and ACO. Arturo Merzario, paired with Nino Vaccarella, did win the 1975 Targa Florio on 20 July driving an Alfa Romeo 33TT12, but the event no longer counted for the championship and the entry was made by Autodelta directly without involvement by the team.

The Kauhsen team started in Formula Two in 1976, purchasing Renault cars, and raced with an assortment of drivers with limited success. Kauhsen then entered the 1979 Formula One season, spending 1978 designing their own chassis with Cosworth engines. They participated in two World Championship Grands Prix with Gianfranco Brancatelli, failing to qualify on both occasions, before the team was shut down.

Sporting positions
Preceded by Giancarlo Baghetti	European Touring Car Champion (Div.1); 1967	Succeeded by John Handley
