= John Woolfe =

English racing driver (1932–1969)

- Nationality: (United Kingdom) British
- Born: 23 March 1932 London, England
- Died: 14 June 1969 (aged 37) Le Mans, France
24 Hours of Le Mans career
- Years: 1968 - 1969
- Teams: John Woolfe Racing (private entrant)
- Best finish: DNF (1968, 1969)
- Class wins: 0

John Woolfe (23 March 1932 – 14 June 1969) was a British racing driver from England, who specialised in sports car racing. He was killed as a result of crashing on the first lap of the 1969 24 Hours of Le Mans race, an event which caused the traditional "Le Mans start" to be abolished the following year.

== Career ==
Woolfe was born in London. He was a gentleman driver, and had several years' experience of racing sports cars. He formed his own team, John Woolfe Racing, with his business partner, Arnold Burton, and in 1968 he bought a Chevron B12. As the prototype class had been limited to 3 litre engines after 1967, his Chevron was specially adapted to be fitted with a 3 litre Repco V8 engine, similar to the unit which in Brabham cars had won the Formula One World Championships in 1966 and 1967. In theory, the car was capable of winning the World Championship.

Woolfe was successful in domestic racing, and also entered several international races. The climax of his season was the 1968 24 Hours of Le Mans, where he entered himself alongside Digby Martland, but retired after only 27 laps, persistent overheating problems causing an engine head gasket failure. He also owned a Lola T70-Chevrolet that complied with 5 litre sports car rules, this type of car won the 1969 24 Hours of Daytona.

Woolfe was dissatisfied with the reliability of the Chevron-Repco, and as the Lola had been made nearly obsolete by the new significantly more powerful Porsche 917 which was up for sale by the dozens, Woolfe decided to buy one for the 1969 24 Hours of Le Mans that took place in June. The 917 was basically a modern prototype, but not limited to 3 litre engine size. Only in April, Porsche had built and presented 25 of them. According to Group 4 Sports Cars rules, they could exploit a loophole in the entry requirements for the World Championship races and use 5 litre engines. The 917s were the fastest vehicles to take part in the event up to this point in its history, it was capable of 220 miles per hour (350 km/h) on the long Mulsanne Straight, but yet untested there. A few factory 917s were entered at Spa and the Nürburgring, and it showed that the 917 was engineered like earlier Porsche, with low drag and minimal downforce. When it reached higher speeds it suffered from an aerodynamic imbalance that made it challenging and unstable to drive; thus, the factory drivers preferred the smaller Porsche 908. As a sports car, and to refinance the immense costs, the 917s were anyway offered to the unsuspecting public for DM140,000 (£16,000).

Woolfe was the first who paid for such a car, which was delivered to him at the Circuit de la Sarthe ahead of practice. Martland withdrew from the event after almost crashing on his second practice lap in the car, judging that it was too fast for him. Woolfe also over-revved the engine, causing it to fail, but Porsche transported a new unit to be fitted to his car. The German marque, which needed privateers to succeed in the 917 to sell the surplus cars, also loaned Woolfe two of its works drivers: Kurt Ahrens qualified the car in ninth position, whilst Herbert Linge was scheduled to partner Woolfe in the race.

== Death ==
The 1969 Le Mans race began with a traditional standing start: the drivers stood opposite their cars in the open pit-lane before running to them as the French flag was dropped to signal the start of the race, starting the engines and driving away as soon as possible. In the scramble to start, many drivers did not fasten their seat belts or close their doors properly to save time, and in 1968 Willy Mairesse had been seriously injured after crashing on the first lap when his unsecured driver's door flew open on the Mulsanne Straight. Woolfe was advised by Porsche to let Linge start the race, as he had more experience with the 917, but Woolfe wanted his family to see him start, and was wary of a possible early retirement preventing them from seeing him in action. He never made it back to start-finish.

Jacky Ickx, the eventual winner, staged a protest against the Le Mans start by calmly walking to his car and securing everything before he got underway, resulting in his being the last driver to leave the starting area. Woolfe, meanwhile, did not fasten his belts and started aggressively, making up several places on the opening lap. At the very fast Maison Blanche curve, however, towards the end of the lap, Woolfe lost control of the 917, which crashed heavily into the barriers, overturned and caught fire. He was thrown out of the cockpit by the force of the impact, and died from his injuries as he was being helicoptered to hospital. It was also reported that Woolfe had lost his door on the opening lap, but this was not confirmed. The 917's fuel tank was torn off in the impact and struck the Ferrari 312P of Chris Amon, causing it to burst into flames. Amon was able to bring his car to a halt and evacuate the cockpit, narrowly escaping serious injuries, though sustaining minor burns.

In April 1970, Kurt Ahrens Jr. suffered a similar high speed shunt while testing a long tail Porsche 917 on a long and partially wet test track in Ehra-Lessien, with the car disintegrating badly- the car went under the Armco barrier and broke in half (as they were known to do), leaving Ahrens strapped in the back. Thus, he walked away, unlike Woolfe.

For the 1970 event, the traditional Le Mans start was replaced by a standing start with the drivers already in their cars, a procedure which was later replaced by a rolling start.

== Legacy ==
After his death at the 1969 24 Hours of Le Mans, John Woolfe Racing was kept going by Arnold Burton and David Riswick in drag racing, and still operates in Bedford as an importer of parts for American vehicles.

In 2009, a French-language book on Woolfe was published, written by Michel Boixière and Michel Fournier and entitled Qui se souvient de John Woolfe ? ("Who remembers John Woolfe?"). Woolfe's Chevron went missing for thirty years, but has recently been discovered in a German barn and is currently being restored.

An English-language biography, John Woolfe: The Man Who Bought a Porsche 917, written by Ian Wagstaff and Woolfe's business partner Dave Riswick, was published in 2026.

== Complete 24 Hours of Le Mans results ==
Year	Result	Team	Car	Class
1968	Ret	John Woolfe Racing	Chevron B12-Repco	P-3000
1969	Ret	John Woolfe Racing	Porsche 917	S-5000

== See also ==
- List of 24 Hours of Le Mans fatal accidents
