= Rudi Lins =

Austrian former racing driver (1944–)

- Born: Rudolf Lins; 28 June 1944 Bludenz, Voralberg, Austria

Rudolf "Rudi" Lins (born 28 June 1944) is an Austrian car dealer and former sportscar racer.

== Career ==
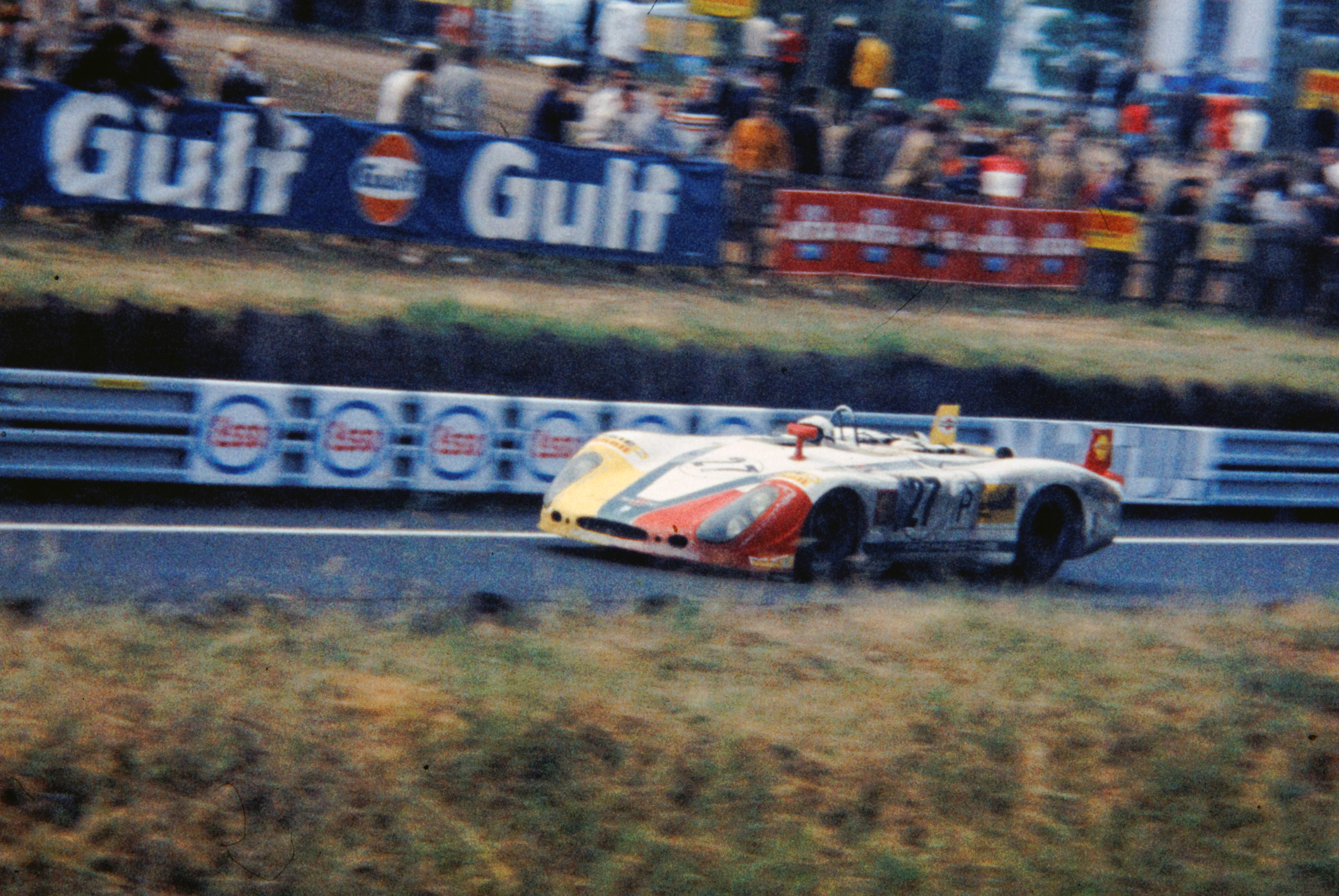
Lins at the wheel of the 908 at the 1970 Le Mans 24 Hours

The son of a Porsche dealer, Lins started racing in the mid-1960s. He financed the first race assignments through his parental business. In 1965 he won the Austrian Sportscar Championship in a Porsche 356, and in 1966, 1967, and 1968, won the Austrian Mountain Championship. His early successes had earned him a Porsche works drive, and he won the touring car category of the 1967 European Hill Climb Championship in a Porsche 906.

Lins scored three podia in the World Sportscar Championship - the 6 Hours of Watkins Glen in 1969 (with Joe Buzzetta), the 1970 24 Hours of Le Mans (with Helmut Marko), and the 1970 Zeltweg 1000km (with Gérard Larrousse), all in Porsche 908s; Lins/Marko won the prestigious Index of Performace at the 1970 24 Hours. He was second in the non-title 1000 km of Paris with Vic Elford in 1968, in a Porsche 910. He ran second in the 1969 24 Hours of Le Mans in a 908 with Willi Kauhsen until the gearbox broke, and won the 3-litre class in the 1970 1000 km of Spa in a Martini Racing 908 with Larrousse.

== Post-motorsport ==
Lins retired from the sport in 1971 and took over the family car dealership in the mid-1970s.

== Results ==
=== Le Mans results ===
Year	Team	Co-Drivers	Car	Class	Laps	Pos.	Class Pos.
1968	(Switzerland) Squadra Tartaruga	(Spain) Alex Soler-Roig	Porsche 907/8	SP	145	ret	ret
1969	(West Germany) Porsche System Engineering	(West Germany) Willi Kauhsen	Porsche 908	SP	317	ret	ret
1970	(West Germany) Martini Racing	(Austria) Helmut Marko	Porsche 908	SP	334	3rd	1st

=== Sportscar results ===
- Racing Sports Cars
