= 1969 24 Hours of Le Mans =

37th 24 Hours of Le Mans endurance race

Previous: 1968	Next: 1970
Index: Races | Winners

The 1969 24 Hours of Le Mans was a motor race staged at the Circuit de la Sarthe, Le Mans, France on 14 and 15 June 1969. It was the 37th Grand Prix of Endurance and was the eighth round of the 1969 International Championship for Makes. The race was open to Group 6 Prototype Sports Cars, Group 4 Sports Cars and Group 3 Grand Touring Cars.

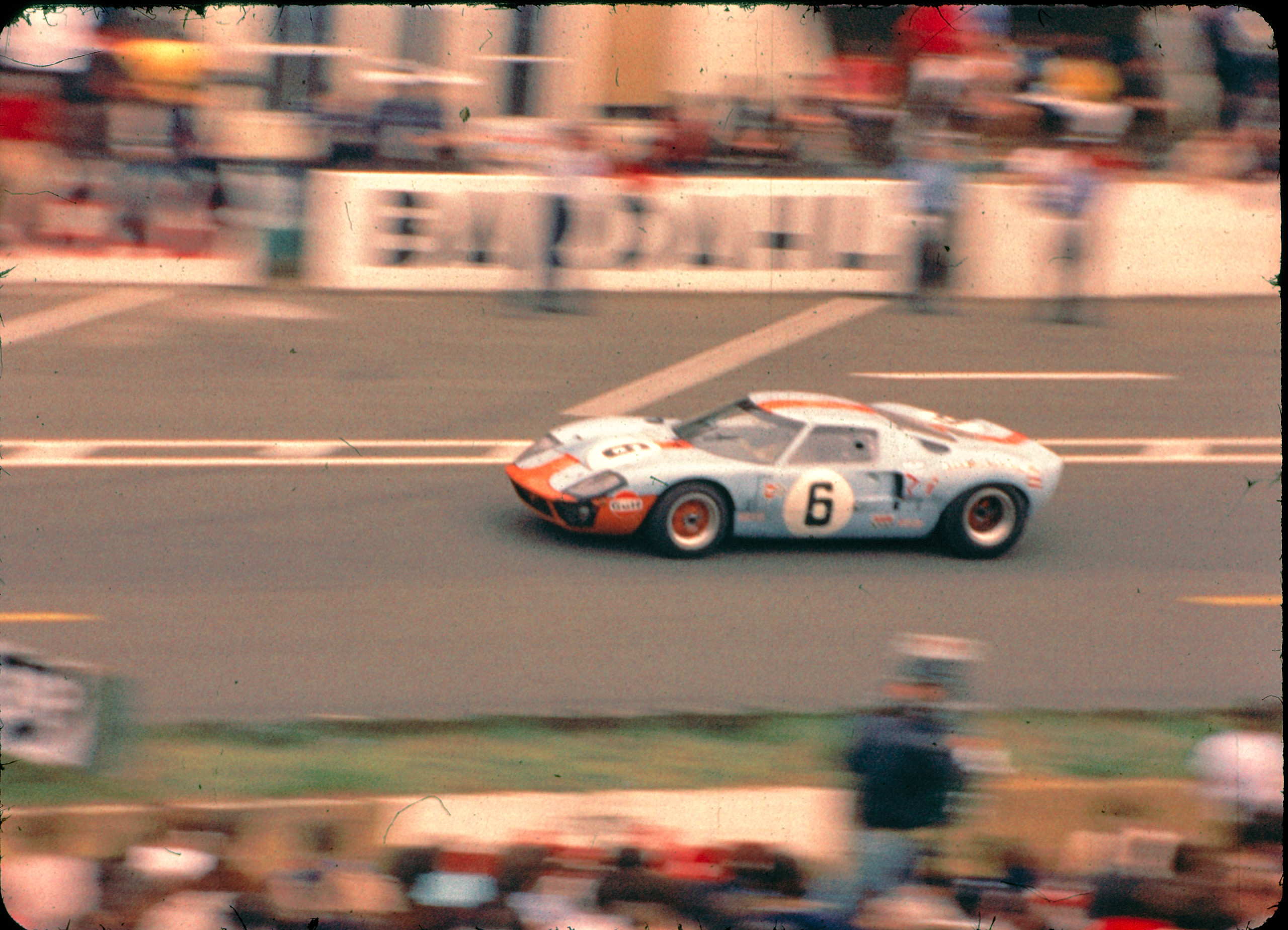
The winning Ford GT40 Mk.I of Jacky Ickx and Jackie Oliver

After 1967, the prototypes were limited to 3 liter engines, same size as in Formula One, but F1 engines did not last in endurance racing. Few such prototypes were entered, Ferrari even boycotted the 1968 season. To increase participation, "sports cars" of which dozens had been made were allowed to race with up to 5 liter capacity if homologated in the Gr. 4 sports car category, like the 1964 Ford GT40 Mk.I or the 1965 Lola T70. These types won the first two 1969 races before the Porsche 908/02 scored five wins in a row to secure the 1969 International Championship for Makes. In 1968, it had been the improved old Gulf-JWA GT40 of John Wyer which did win the 1968 WC and the postponed to September '68 Le Mans over the still unreliable Porsche 908.

With the Gr. 4 minimum number being lowered to 25 for 1969, Porsche took an unforeseen risk and invested millions in basically building 25 modern yet big-engine prototypes. In early 1966 they had built and sold 50+ Porsche 906 for the 2.0 liter Gr. 4 sports car category while Ferrari failed with the Dino 206 S. Now they enlarged the 3-litre flat-8-cylinder of the 908 into a 4.5-litre flat-12 and showed the required 25 Porsche 917 for homologation in April 1969. Porsche also had sorted out the 908 by introducing a 908/02 spyder version that won 5 championship heats in a row and secured the 1969 Championship for Makes. With two car types, they were strong favourites to achieve their first outright Le Mans win. The 917s, all produced up front as soon as possible, were not tested yet, and showed high speed instability at the Le Mans test day, made worse by the FIA banning wings after crashes in F1. At the first 917 races in May, at Spa and Nürburgring, the factory drivers preferred the 908. Porsche customer teams hesitated to purchase the unproven 917, but privateer John Woolfe acquired one just before the race.

It was the last year with the traditional "Le Mans" style start, in which the drivers run across the track to enter their cars, start them, and race away. This was introduced decades ago when cars were open and safety standards were not as strict. In the 1960s closed GT coupes with sometimes flimsy doors were common, and roll bars, helmets and belts came in use. The previous year, Willy Mairesse crashed on the first lap while trying to properly close the door of his Ford GT40 at speed on the Mulsanne Straight; the career-ending crash would have been avoided entirely if not for the hastiness of the Le Mans-style start. During the 1969 start, eventual winner Jacky Ickx famously staged his own one-man protest by walking to his GT40, and taking his time doing up his belts. Meanwhile, privateer John Woolfe ran with the other drivers, but with little experience in the very fast 917, he flipped on the opening lap near Maison Blanche corner, and not yet strapped in properly, was killed when he was ejected from the car that broke up.

The race was one of the most exciting in the event's history. Including several 911, more than one-third of the starting cars were Porsches, and the two mighty factory-entered 917s held the lead for 90% of the race before the drivetrains failed, like in most 908.

When also the Elford/Attwood 917's gearbox broke at 11 a.m., it was the Ford of Ickx and Jackie Oliver that took over the lead. The race ended in a 3-hour sprint, with the Ford battling the pursuing Porsche 908 of Hans Herrmann and Gérard Larrousse non-stop. With both cars having issues, in the end, the Ford GT40 Mk.I – the same chassis #1075 that had won the previous year – took the chequered flag just 120 metres ahead of the Porsche after 24 hours of racing.

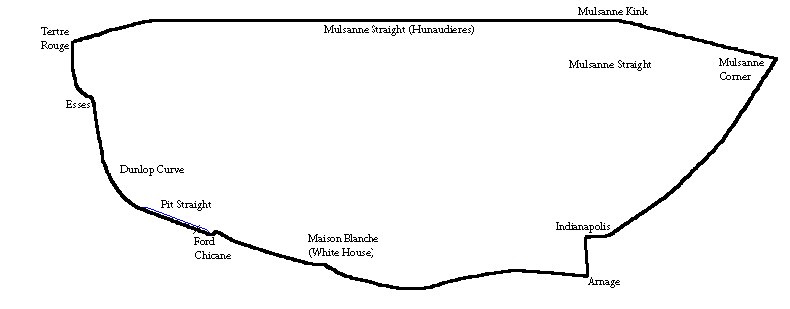
Le Mans in 1969

== Regulations ==
In the 1967 race, the prototypes of Ferrari, 330P4 with 4 litre V12, and Ford GT40 Mk.IV with 7 Litre V8, had been very fast. Thus, starting in 1968, prototype cars in World Championship and at Le Mans were limited to 3 litres, same size as in Formula One since 1966. The F1 engines were not reliable for endurance racing, though. There were few entries, as Ferrari stayed absent in protest, and Ford did not really support the Ford P68. Only Alfa, Matra, and Porsche showed up with factory 3 litre entries, plus some private efforts. In addition, Gr.4 Sports Cars with engines up to 5 litre were allowed if at least 50 were produced, like Ford GT40 and Lola T70.

Heeding the calls of race promoters worried about diminishing fields, the FIA CSI sought to fix things by reducing the minimum production figure to run in Group 4 from 50 to 25. Even though they had a 5 litre engine capacity limit, it was reasoned that it would not be a difference as the old already produced cars were usually not as competitive as the newer Group 6 Prototypes. This however, left a flaw in the system for manufacturers with the resources and commitment to exploit the regulations. Ford had built over 100 GT40 to GT rules after 1963, but Ferrari failed to show enough Ferrari 250 LM for GT homologation, and Dino 206 S for Gr.4 in 1966. Porsche had been underdogs running engines up to 2 litre, bored out to 2.2 litre in 1967, and had provided homologated 2.0 litre 904 GT and Gr.4 906 and 910 to dozens of customers. Only in 1968 they entered the maximum capacity prototype class with their first 3 litre, only to be beaten by the introduction of an additional loop hole 5 liter sportscars category. Ferdinand Piëch was willing and able to step up into this category, too, and construct 25 new chassis of a new de facto 5 litre prototype, the 917, to get it homologated with a 4.5-litre engine for Group 4 for races after April 1969, starting at the 1000km Spa.

This year the Automobile Club de l'Ouest (ACO) brought the time of start and finish forward to 2pm, to allow more time on Sunday afternoon for the French spectators to vote in the deciding second round of the 1969 French presidential election. New Armco crash barriers were installed around the circuit, including on the Mulsanne Straight, where there was previously no protection from the trees, houses and embankments in the event of a car leaving the track. Sandbanks were replaced by barriers.

== Entries ==
Into the second year of the new 3-litre regulations for Group 6 Prototypes, the initial entries closed with 109 applications – the biggest number in the past decade. However, after the requisite culling 60 cars were accepted, but a number of withdrawals meant only 51 practiced with non-starters reducing the final grid to only 45, the smallest field in the decade. After a dominant season to date, Porsche had already won the 1969 International Championship for Makes and arrived with easily the biggest representation with 16 cars, a third of the field.

Category	Classes	Prototype Group 6	Sports Group 4	GT Group 3	Total Entries
Large-engines	>2.0L classes	14 (+1 reserve)	11 (+3 reserves)	1 (+1 reserve)	26 (+5 reserves)
Medium-engines	1.6 / 2.0L classes	5 (+2 reserves)	1 (+1 reserve)	4 (+4 reserves)	10 (+7 reserves)
Small-engines	1.15 / 1.3L classes	5	0	0	5 (+0 reserves)
Total Cars		23 (+2 reserves)	13 (+5 reserves)	5 (+5 reserves)	41 (+12 reserves)

Porsche had already wrapped up the championship after the seven races to date. Starting in July 1968, Porsche made a surprising and very expensive effort to conceive, design and build a whole new car for the Group 4 Sport category with one underlying goal: to win its first overall victory at Le Mans. In only ten months, the first Porsche 917 prototype was developed with a fibreglass body and Porsche's first 12-cylinder engine. Bored out to 4.5-litres, made from titanium, magnesium and exotic alloys, it produced a mighty 520 bhp. The 917 included another feature which would prove to be controversial in the week leading up to the race: movable aerodynamic wings linked to the suspension. These were banned by the CSI (Commission Sportive Internationale – the FIA's regulatory body) at the Monaco GP in May as dangerous. Porsche team manager, Rico Steinemann, protested that their test-sessions had shown the car was inherently unstable without them and that the cars had been homologated for Group 4 with the flaps. A last-minute decision the day before Le Mans by the FISA allowed them to race, although the 908s had to lose the flaps as they had previously run without them. Team Matra was particularly upset by this decision, but in a statement said they did not intend to protest. It was widely believed that if the ban was again reinstated because of a protest by other teams, Porsche would have pulled out of the 1969 race entirely.

By May the necessary 25 chassis were completed for homologation, intended to be sold to private racing teams at $35,000 each. The first was purchased by a private interest by the time of the Le Mans race, that of Briton John Woolfe. The cars had their first race at Spa, and three works entries were at Le Mans in langheck (longtail) form for Vic Elford/Richard Attwood and Rolf Stommelen/Kurt Ahrens, with Herbert Linge in the reserve car.

In the Prototype class, Porsche had three works 908s, also in langheck form, including regular team drivers Gerhard Mitter / Udo Schütz. This season's version was at least 20% lighter than the 1968 car. The new 908/2 spyder version that had been very successful through the season was run by the team's lead drivers, Jo Siffert and Brian Redman, through Siffert's sponsor, Hart Ski with strong works support. There were also a pair of privateer 910s in the 2-litre Prototype class.

After a tight season last year, Ford were no longer as competitive as their Porsche rivals. Although the GT40 was showing its age, five were entered. John Wyer's J.W. Automotive, managed by David Yorke, chose not to run the disappointing Group 6 Mirage M2s and instead entered two of the cars they ran in the previous year's race. They kept their regular driving combinations: Jacky Ickx / Jackie Oliver and David Hobbs / Mike Hailwood. There were also entries for Alan Mann Racing and a race-debut for Reinhold Joest, as a driver.

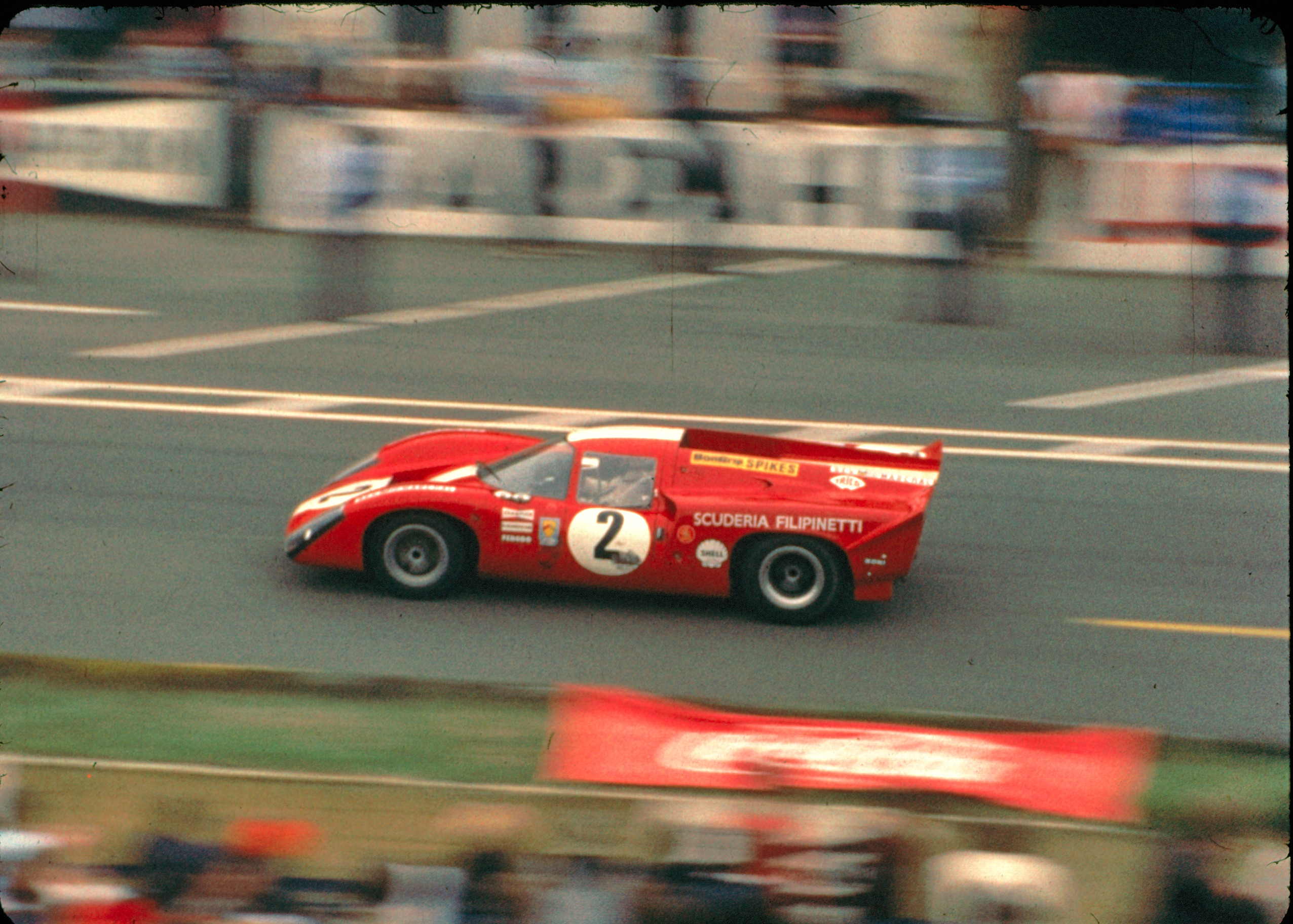
Lola T70 MK III B of Bonnier/Gregory, passing the pits during the race

After an inauspicious debut in 1967, the Lola T70 Mk 3 had gradually improved, and with sufficient production now completed to put it into the Sports category, it could run the far more reliable, race-proven, Chevrolet 5-litre V8 engine. The new Mk 3B, designed by Eric Broadley, was the first racing car to use the new ultralight, ultra-strong, carbon-fibre. A victory in the opening championship round at Daytona for Roger Penske's team boded well. Lola withdrew its entries after Paul Hawkins burned to death in an accident in May driving a Lola at the RAC Tourist Trophy. Without the works team, it was Scuderia Filipinetti who ran a car for Jo Bonnier/Masten Gregory.

The SEFAC-Ferrari works team returned to Le Mans after a year's absence, with the new 312P prototype, a design strongly akin to the Can-Am 612P. It ran a 3-litre V12 engine based on the Ferrari Formula 1 engine, developing 430 bhp. Two cars were entered, for former race-winners Chris Amon and Pedro Rodriguez, partnered with hill-climb specialist Peter Schetty and David Piper respectively. The North American Racing Team (NART) once again had three different options entered in the Sports category: its 1965 race-winning 275LM car was back, with a new 365 GTB/4 in the over-2-litre class, and a Dino 206 S in the under-2-litre class.

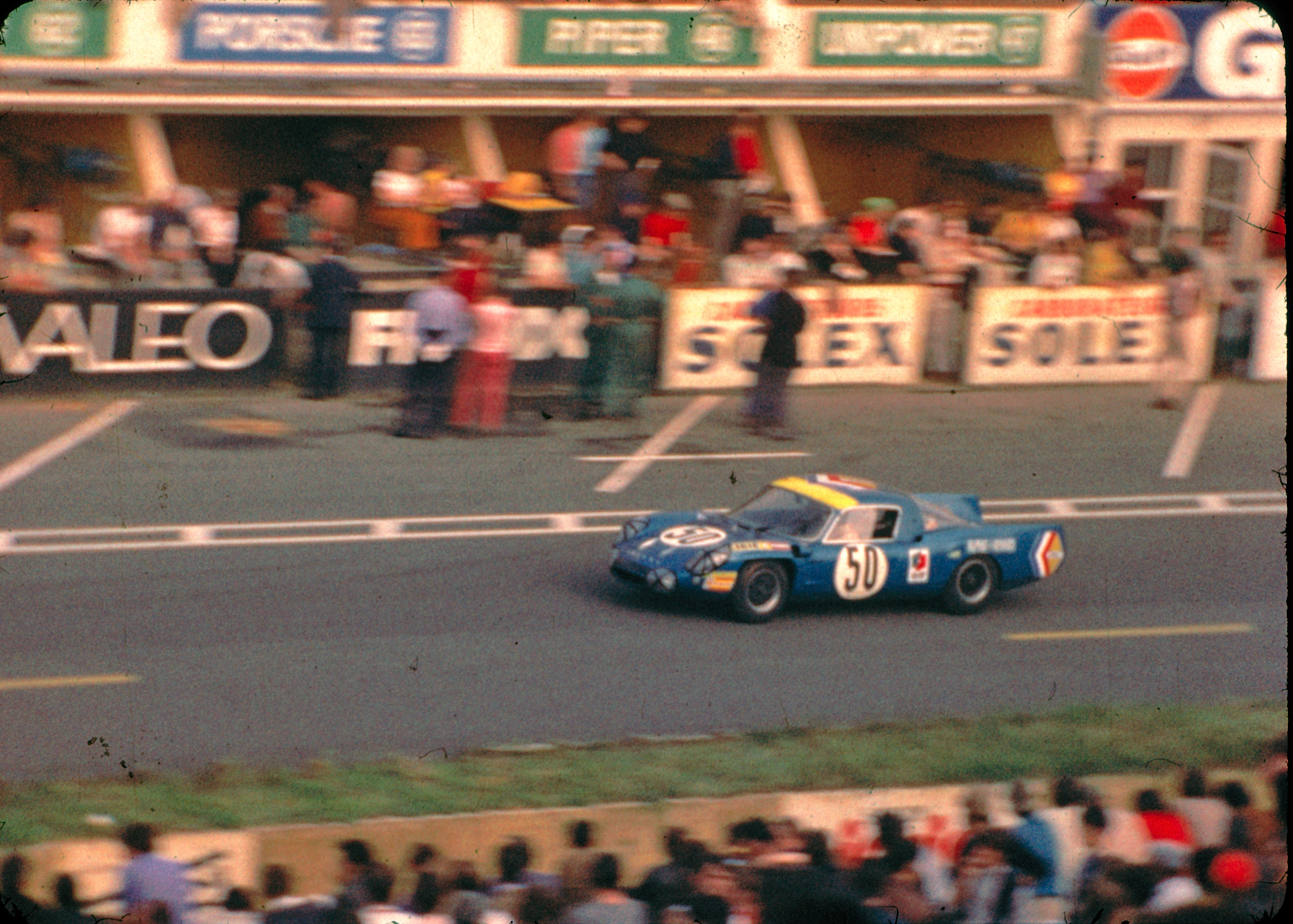
Alpine A210 of Serpaggi/Ethuin, which won the P 1150 class and the Index of Performance

Alpine returned with its A220, Gordini had now fuel-injected the Renault 3-litre to produce a still-underwhelming 330 bhp. Mauro Bianchi, badly injured at the 1968 race, was now the works-team manager after he failed the medical at the Monza round. As well as the three works cars, there was one for their regular customer team, the Ecurie Savin-Calberson. The two teams, alongside another French privateer team, Trophée Le Mans, ran four of the A210 in the smaller Prototype classes including one for French ski-champions Jean-Claude Killy and Bob Wollek.

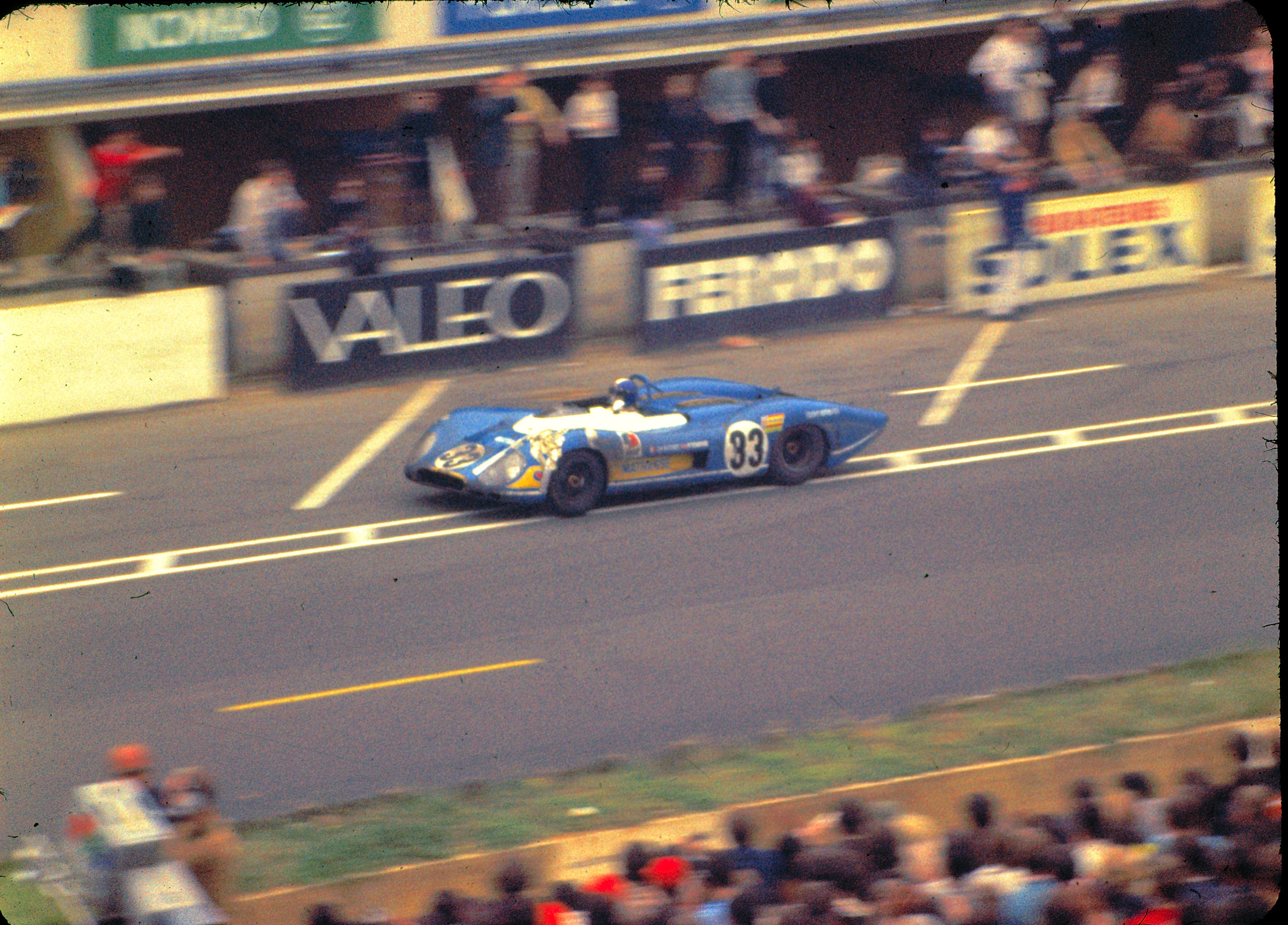
Matra MS 650 of Beltoise/Courage passes the pits during the race

After a strong showing in the 1968 race, the French team Matra gave up its Formula 1 development (leaving it to Ken Tyrrell's Matra International) to focus on its sports-car program. Aerodynamic engineer Robert Choulet designed a low-drag coupé specially for the Le Mans, the Matra 640, bearing a resemblance to his Panhard CD designs but with the Matra 3-litre V12 engine. Not ready in time for the March test weekend, Matra was able to get a special test in April. Henri Pescarolo took to the track, but at the first kilometres on the Mulsanne Straight, the car got airborne, doing a 360° loop, before smashing into roadside trees and catching fire. Pescarolo was pulled out alive but had two broken vertebrae and severe burns to his face and arms. The project was cancelled; however development was also proceeding on the 630. This led to a new open-top car, the 650. Only one had been finished (just before scrutineering) for Jean-Pierre Beltoise / Piers Courage, while two former 630 chassis were converted (christened 630/650) for Johnny Servoz-Gavin/Herbert Müller and 'Nanni' Galli/Robin Widdows. There was also an MS630 for Nino Vaccarella/Jean Guichet who had won the 1964 race together for Ferrari. Meanwhile, Pescarolo did race commentary for French TV from his hospital bed.

Aside from the Lola, British cars were limited to the small manufacturers. The Chevron B8 had been homologated into Group 4, with a 2-litre BMW engine. Donald Healey had returned with its SR 2-litre prototype, improved from extensive testing at Silverstone. The Unipower GT had a 1275cc Mini Cooper S engine, while the Piper GTR had a 1300cc Ford engine. Smallest car in the field was the Abarth 1000SP

After their excellent result in the previous year's race, Alfa Romeo's Autodelta works team was favourites for a class-win. However, the team withdrew after the death of their lead-driver and 1968 race-winner, Lucien Bianchi, at the March test weekend trialing the new Tipo 33/3– the third driver death for the team in testing after Jean Rolland and Leo Cella in 1968. Instead it fell to the Belgian customer team VDS to run two of the older model Tipo 33/2, one with a 2.5-litre V8 engine.

The GT category was still a limited field. Scuderia Filipinetti had a lock on the over 2-litre class, with both entries – a Corvette Stingray and Ferrari 275 GTB/C. The under 2-litre class was only contested by 911 privateers – the Porsche already proving to be the car of choice in this class.

Alfa-Romeo and Abarth factory entries dropped out because of a customs strike, and Ferrari North America also scratched some entries.

== Practice ==
The test weekend was held on 29/30 March and was marred by the fatal accident to Lucien Bianchi in the new 3-litre Alfa Romeo. Apparent mechanical failure hit the car on the Hunaudières straight, coming over the hump approaching the Mulsanne corner at over 305 km/h (190 mph). The car crashed into a telephone pole and a transformer station and exploded. Bianchi was killed instantly by the impact.

From the test weekend Rolf Stommelen, in the brand new Porsche 917, recorded a 3:30.7 over three seconds quicker than Servoz-Gavin in the Matra. Paul Hawkins in a works Lola was third-quickest with a 3:35.2.

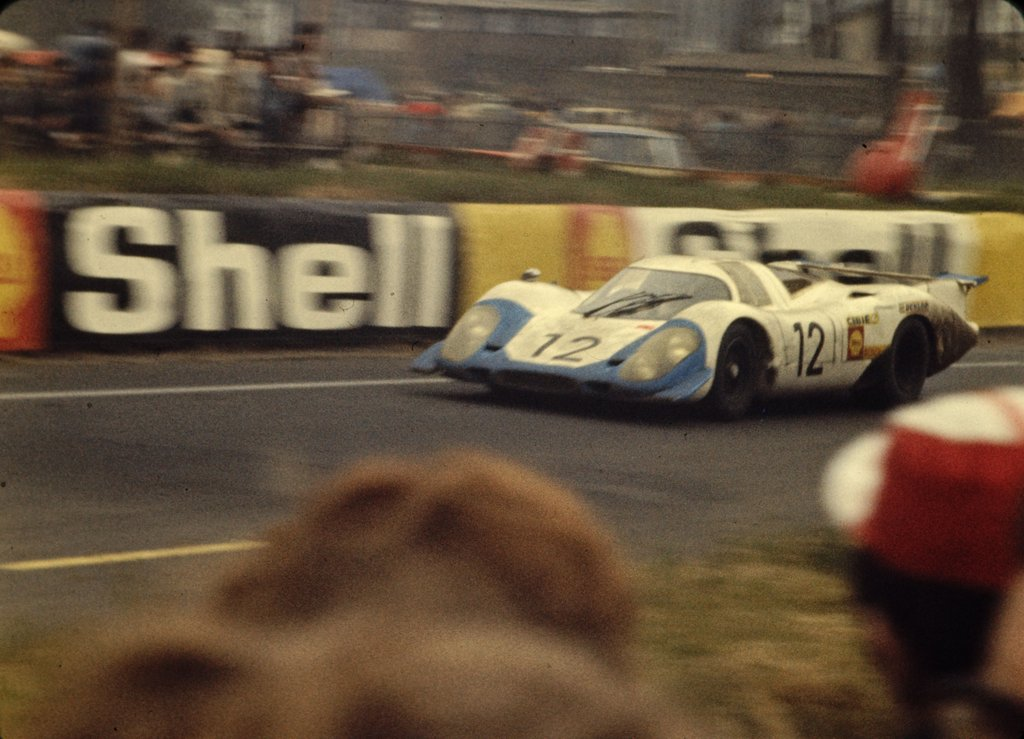
Porsche 917 of Elford/Attwood during the race

The power of the new Porsche 917 was shown by Stommelen on the first night of practice when he put in a blistering lap of 3:22.9 to take pole position. This was over 2 seconds faster than the sister car of Vic Elford. It was also 0.7 seconds faster than the lap record held by the big Mark IVs of Denny Hulme and Mario Andretti in 1967 (set without the Ford chicane present). Despite a top speed over 20 km/h slower than the Fords, this was achieved with the great advances in downforce. In the end, Porsche chose to only race two of their three 917s. Woolfe had busted his engine in practise grabbing 1st instead of 3rd but was able to get a replacement one from Porsche.

The Porsche 908s of Jo Siffert and Rudi Lins were third and fourth then came the Ferraris of Rodriguez and Amon with 3:35 laps. The best Matra was Servoz-Gavin in 11th (3:36.4) and Ickx put the top Ford in 13th. The underpowered Alpines were well off the pace of their contemporaries with qualifying laps in the 3:45s putting them midfield. The top 2-litre car was the Gosselin/Bourgoignie Alfa Romeo in 27th (4:09.8) with the first 911 doing 4:28.2 to qualify 35th.

NART had a bad practice when its Dino collided with its Daytona stablemate approaching the Mulsanne corner, putting both cars out for the race. A curious incident happened in practice when Bonnier pitted his Lola and got out covered in blood and feathers. Apparently he had hit a bird and it had been sucked through a cooling vent into the cockpit. With the proviso that all cars had to qualify within 85% of the pole-sitting car's average speed for safety reasons, it meant that several cars failed to qualify.

== Race ==
=== Start ===
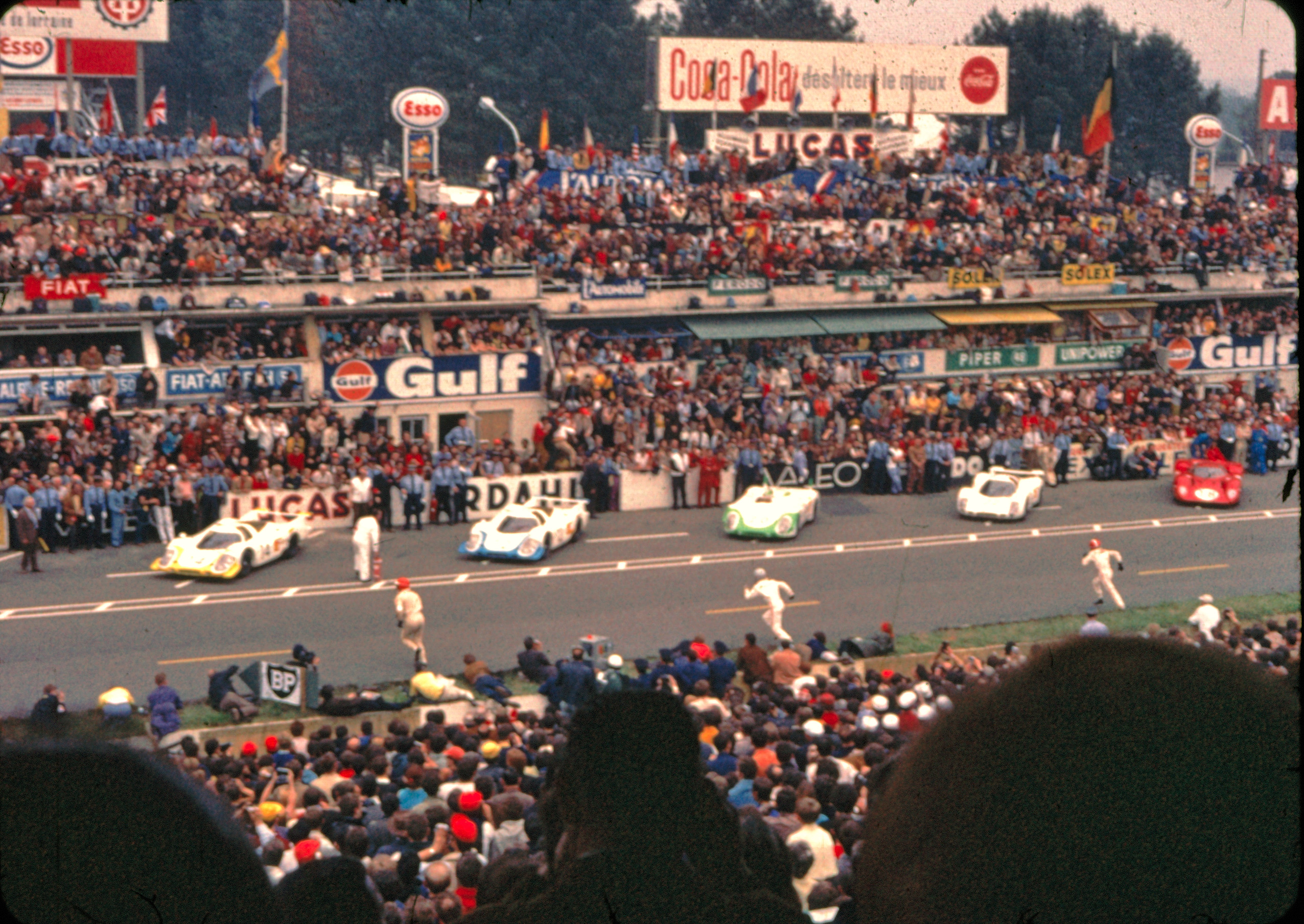
Drivers running to their cars at the start of the race

After a sunny week, race-day was overcast. At the drop of the flag it was Stommelen, who was first under the Dunlop bridge. In yet another deadly year of motorsport Jacky Ickx, mindful of the accident that had ended the career of his former teammate Willy Mairesse's on the first lap of the previous year's race staged a protest. He rebelled against the traditional Le Mans starting procedure to run across the track to their cars, climb in, start the car, and move the to pull away from the grid. Instead Ickx walked slowly to his car, properly put on his safety belts, and only then moved the car. Doing so relegated Ickx to the back of the starting grid.

His concern was borne out almost immediately. On the very first lap, the twitchy handling of the Porsche 917 and the inexperience of one of its drivers resulted in a major accident: the death of British gentleman-driver John Woolfe. Woolfe purchased his 917 for £16000 (US$40,000) only days earlier and was quoted by a colleague as having said its power "scared the pants off me". Porsche racing manager Rico Steinemann was quoted as having pled with Woolfe before the race to allow his works-driver teammate Herbert Linge to drive the first stint, but he demurred. Woolfe crashed approaching Maison Blanche when he got two wheels on the grass and lost control. He was thrown free of the car as it spun, rolled, hit an embankment, and exploded. Woolfe was taken by helicopter to a nearby hospital, but was dead on arrival.

The nearly full fuel tank from Woolfe's car became dislodged and landed, burning, in front of the oncoming Ferrari 312P of Chris Amon. Amon ran over it, and Woolfe's fuel tank jammed underneath causing Amon's to rupture and explode as well. Amon set off the on-board fire extinguisher and was uninjured but forced to retire the car. Debris virtually blocked the road and a number of cars were affected including the Healey, Gardner's Ford and Jabouille's Alpine. The rest of the field was virtually halted and slowly picked its way through the carnage.

Stommelen led the race to the first pitstops, leading a train of five Porsches (Stommelen, Elford, Siffert, Mitter, Herrmann). Bonnier's Lola was sixth, but then Stommelen was delayed by oil leaking from the transmission. Gardner brought the Alan Mann Ford in several times with overheating because debris from the accident had holed the radiator. Jo Siffert and Brian Redman took over the lead until they too were crippled by an oil-leak in the gearbox after four hours. This moved the Elford/Attwood 917 to the lead, ahead of the other 908 team cars of Mitter/Schütz, Herrmann/Larrousse and Lins/Kauhsen, pursued by the Matra of Beltoise/Courage then the Wyer Ford of Ickx/Oliver in 6th. In the sixth hour a number of cars had problems: Herrmann was delayed for 20 minutes repairing the front suspension with parts from Siffert's car (dropping to 12th), and the Matra lost two laps fixing a faulty rear light. The leading Alpine of de Cortanze/Vinatier (running 11th) lost a wheel at Indianapolis corner. With a large crowd of observers he 'fortuitously' found the right tools on the grass verge but dropped well back. The Matra was being raced very hard and by dusk, at 9pm, had made it up to second only to be delayed repeatedly by slow pitwork.

=== Night ===
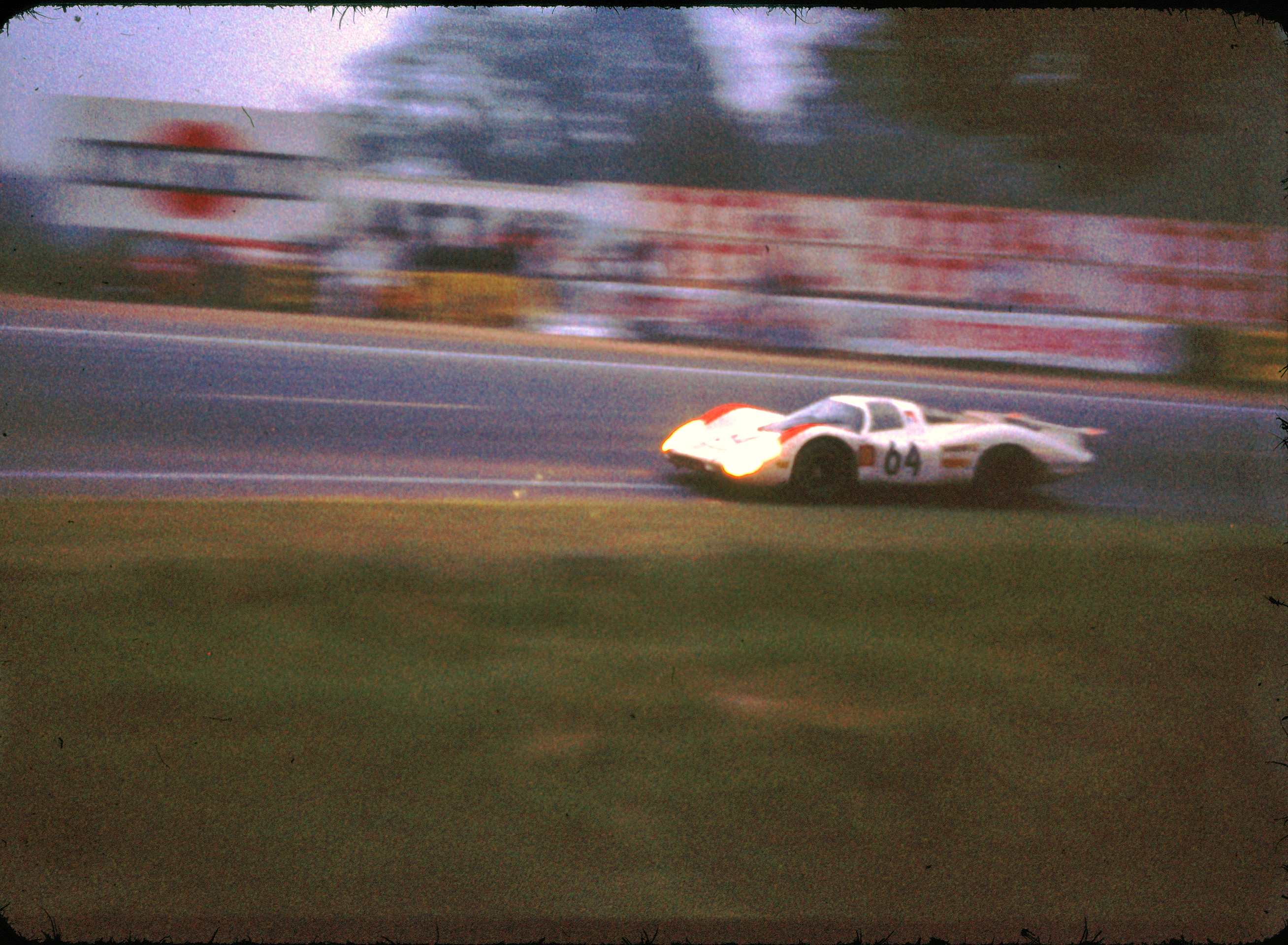
Porsche 908 #64 of Herrmann/Larrousse during the race

As night fell, the three works Porsches were ahead of the two Wyer Fords and also running in the top-3 of the Index of Performance. Bonnier and Gregory were having a good run in the Lola, running sixth, until overheating issues at 11pm forced a 3-hour pitstop to change heads and gaskets. 'Taf' Gosselin got it wrong approaching the Ford chicane, going straight on and crashing although the driver escaped without injury. The big Alpines had been plagued by engine issues, and just after midnight the last one suffered head gasket failure. At the 2am halfway mark Elford/Attwood had done 192 laps, four ahead of Schütz/Mitter and Lins/Kauhsen (187), then back to the Fords (both 184 laps) and the Vaccarella/Guichet Matra (183).

Disaster struck two Porsches at 2.45am when the 908 sister cars of Udo Schütz (running 3rd) and Gérard Larrousse (now 8th) collided at the Mulsanne kink. Schütz's car rolled, burst into flames and almost broke in half. The driver escaped uninjured, but retired from racing a few weeks later after his team mate Gerhard Mitter was killed before the 1969 German Grand Prix. Larrousse's #64 car made it to the pits with bodywork damage and was quickly repaired. It eventually finished second.

=== Morning ===
Dawn saw the 917 of Elford/Attwood driving within itself and still leading the 908 of Lins/Kauhsen. The Wyer Fords were 3rd and 4th with the Herrmann/Larrousse Porsche motoring back through the field, up to 5th. The remaining 312P Ferrari was in 8th with ongoing oil-leak issues splitting the three remaining Matras until it finally retired just after 5am. Through the night the Matras had had their problems: Galli spent an hour getting new fuel pumps fitted and Courage had a broken headlight then clipped a Porsche 911 on Mulsanne, getting bodywork damage. But come the daylight he and Beltoise pushed hard to close in on the Fords. At 6am, as a heavy mist came down over the circuit the leaders had a 5-lap lead and there were only 19 cars still running.

The 1.5L Alpine, of Killy/Wollek, had been running very quickly and steadily moving up the order to as high as 11th leading the medium-engined cars and the Thermal Efficiency Index. But soon after 8am it was retired with broken suspension much to the disappointment of the French crowd.

Then around 10.15am, with barely 3 hours left to run, the two leading Porsches both came in with unscheduled pitstops. The mechanics examined them but to no avail – the Lins/Kauhsen car stopped on Mulsanne with a broken clutch. The 917 limped on for another half-hour before a cracked weld in its gearbox stopped it for good. Within a matter of minutes, the Ickx/Oliver Ford now found itself in the lead. The Herrmann/Larrousse Porsche had been driving hard making up time and when the other Wyer Ford of Hobbs/Hailwood lost two laps changing its rear brakes the 908 moved up to second place.

=== Finish and post-race ===
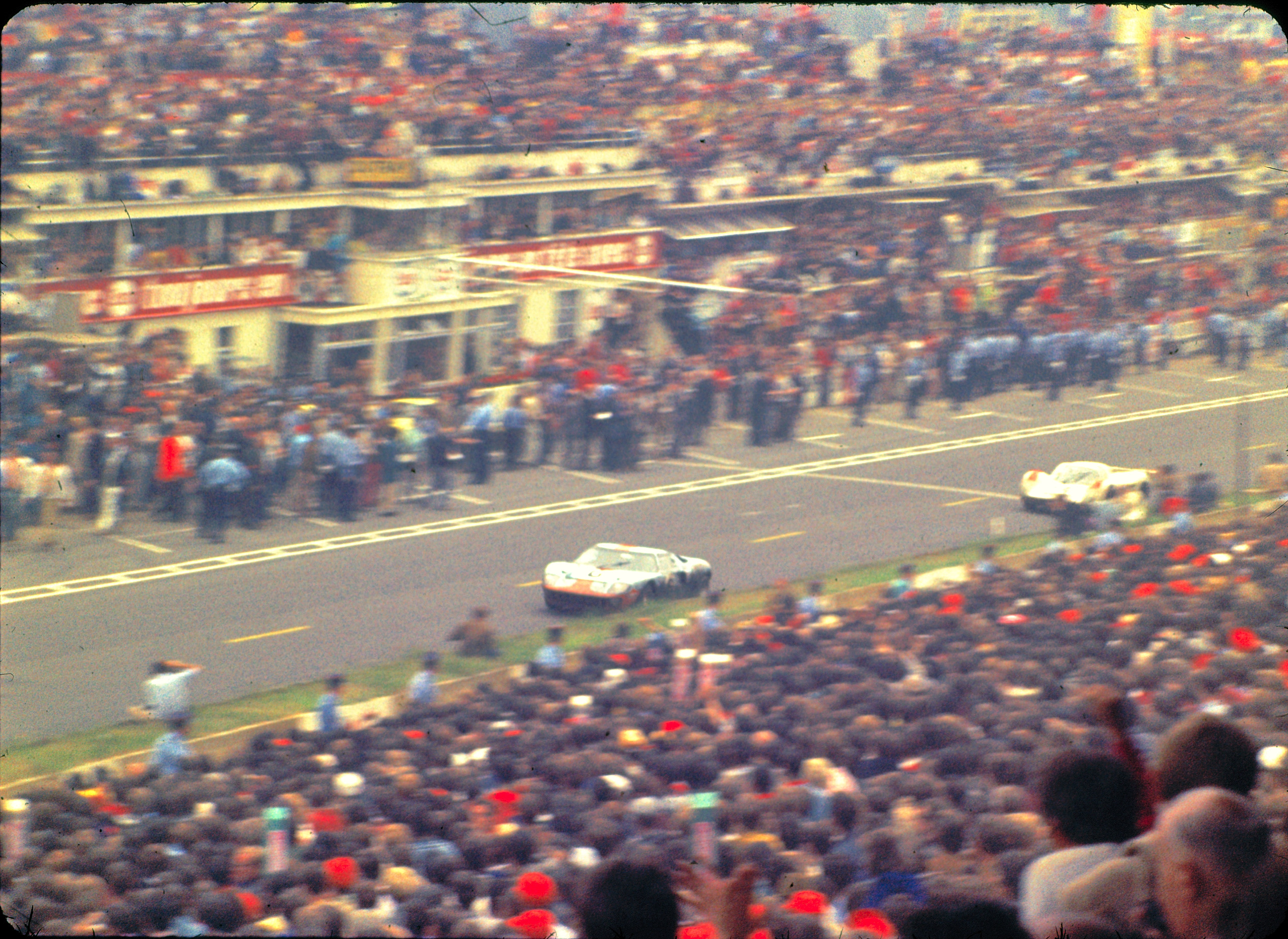
The GT40 of Ickx/Oliver passes the pits just ahead of the Porsche 908 of Herrmann/Larrousse

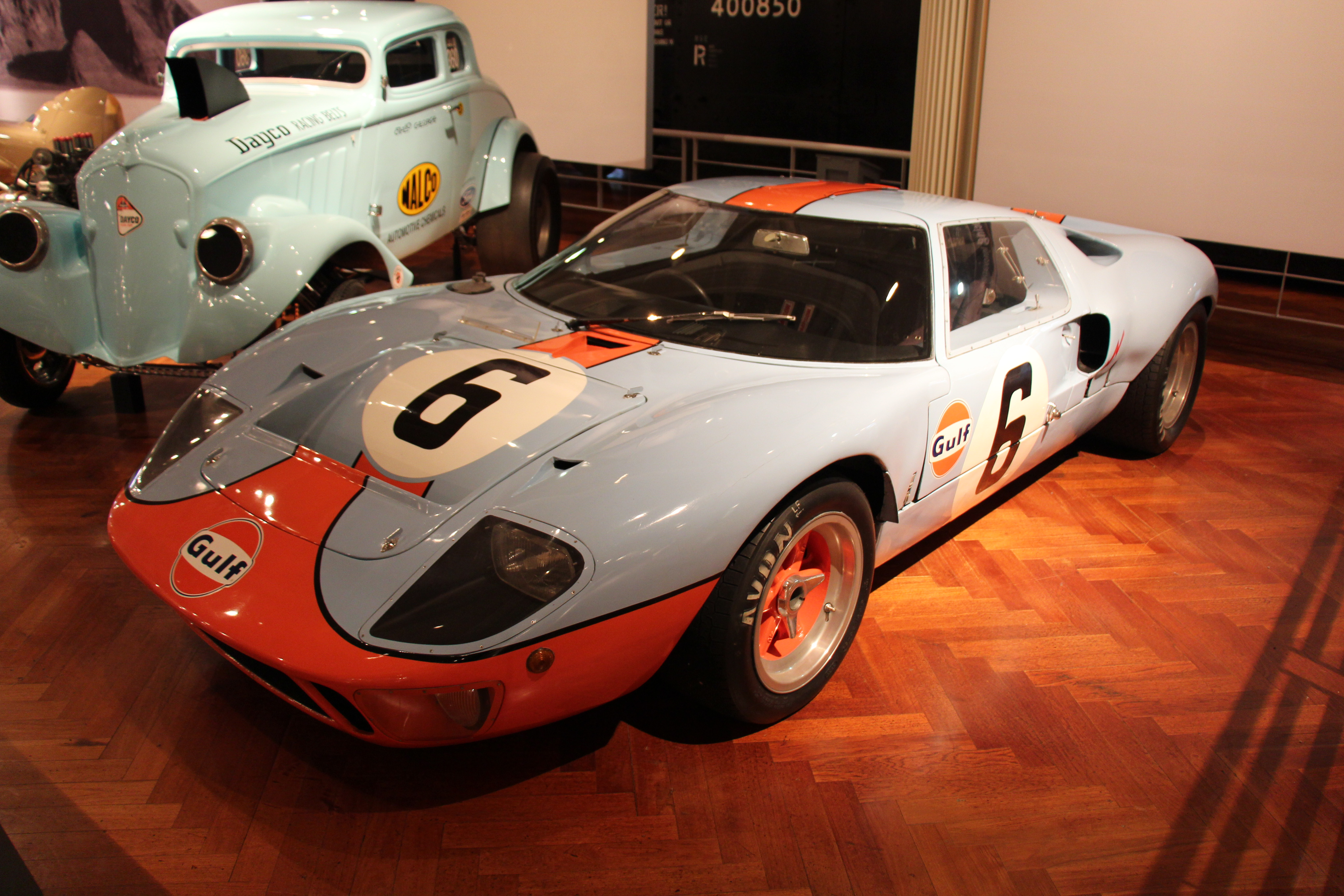
The winning Ford GT40, driven by Ickx and Oliver

Going into the final hour after their final pit-stops, both teams put their best drivers in the cars. Ickx and Herrmann were now on the same lap, barely 10 seconds apart. The Porsche 908 had fading brakes and an engine now 400rpm down on power and the Ford GT40 suffered from exhaust problems, making for a very even contest. In a dramatic finish, Ickx and Herrmann repeatedly overtook each other. Ickx knew if he led onto the Mulsanne straight, Herrmann would pass, but he could slipstream past him back again before the Mulsanne corner and then hold a lead for the rest of a lap. Due to the flat-out racing, both leading cars crossed the line with less than a minute to go and had to go around one more time. The Ford had only ever done 23 laps on a tank of fuel, but now needed an extra lap. So on the last lap, Ickx let Herrmann pass him early on the Mulsanne Straight, faking a lack of power from fuel starvation. Ickx used the slipstream of Herrmann to save fuel and the fading 908 brakes to pass under braking at the end of the 5 km straight. With the bigger Ford engine and working brakes, Ickx managed to hold on to the lead and beat Herrmann by a few seconds, and a distance of about 120 metres (390 feet). Ickx and Oliver won with the GT40 chassis #1075 (nicknamed the 'Old Lady'), the same car that had won the previous year. This was only the second time the same car had won two years in a row; a Bentley Speed Six had done it in 1929 and 1930. Ickx dedicated the team's victory to Lucien Bianchi, who had been killed earlier in the year, and had helped the Wyer team win the Le Mans the previous year.

The Hobbs and Hailwood Wyer Ford, after its delay, finished third four laps behind, just ahead of the Matra of Beltoise/Courage. The older Matra of Vaccarella/Guichet was 5th a distant 9 laps behind and the German Ford of Kelleners/Joest 6th an even further 18 laps behind them. The veteran NART Ferrari 275LM finished eighth, covering 250 km (155 miles) less than its race-winning performance in 1965. With eight cars entered, Alpine had great expectations but the only one to finish was the smallest: the 1-litre A210 of Serpaggi/Ethuin finished 12th, 80 laps behind the Ford, but winning the lucrative Index of Performance covering almost 30% more distance than its small-engine target. For the first time since 1926 there were no all-British entries among the finishers.

So, once again Porsche, Matra and Renault left without their coveted Le Mans victory. It was the first win of six for Jacky Ickx (a record that stood until 2005 when beaten by Tom Kristensen). He had walked across the track at the start line and still won. The ACO's response to that was proactive and the iconic Le Mans start was discontinued. Ironically Ickx himself had a road accident near Chartres while driving to Paris on the Monday morning after the race. A car pulled in front of his Porsche 911. Ickx's car ended up crushed against a utility pole. Ickx unbuckled his seat belt and stepped unharmed from the wrecked Porsche.

Later in the month, Enzo Ferrari sold sufficient stock holdings in his company to the Fiat S.p.A. to raise their share to 50%. In another bad year for motorsport accidents, the Porsche works team lost four of its drivers at the August 1969 German Grand Prix which took place a week before the final WSC race, the 1000 km Zeltweg, where Porsche factory drivers had to support potential Porsche 917 customers. Gerhard Mitter, driving an BMW 269 F2 within the F1 contest, was killed in practise. The other two BMW were withdrawn, and Hans Herrmann withdrew his Lotus F2 entry, too. Mitter's teammate Udo Schütz retired from racing altogether. Then Vic Elford had a major accident on the first lap with Mario Andretti and broke his arm in three places. The German F2-within-F1 race had also marked the return to racing of Henri Pescarolo, in an F2 Matra, after his test-accident.

Finally, Jacques Loste, race director of the ACO since 1957, retired later in the year. His successor was the manufacturer/engineer, and Le Mans veteran, Charles Deutsch.

== Official results ==
=== Finishers ===
Results taken from Quentin Spurring's book, officially licensed by the ACO Class Winners are in Bold text.

Pos	Class	No.	Team	Drivers	Chassis	Engine	Tyre	Laps
1	**S** **5.0**	**6**	**(United Kingdom) JW Automotive Engineering**	**(Belgium) Jacky Ickx** **(United Kingdom) Jackie Oliver**	Ford GT40	Ford 4.9L V8	F	372
2	**P** **3.0**	**64** (reserve)	**(Germany) Porsche System Engineering**	**(Germany) Hans Herrmann** **(France) Gérard Larrousse**	Porsche 908LH Coupé	Porsche 3.0L F8	D	372
3	S 5.0	7	(United Kingdom) JW Automotive Engineering	(United Kingdom) David Hobbs (United Kingdom) Mike Hailwood	Ford GT40	Ford 4.9L V8	F	368
4	P 3.0	33	(France) Equipe Matra – Elf	(France) Jean-Pierre Beltoise (United Kingdom) Piers Courage	Matra-Simca MS650	Matra 3.0L V12	D	368
5	P 3.0	32	(France) Equipe Matra – Elf	(France) Jean Guichet (Italy) Nino Vaccarella	Matra-Simca MS630	Matra 3.0L V12	D	359
6	S 5.0	68 (reserve)	(Germany) Deutsche Auto Zeitung	(Germany) Helmut Kelleners (Germany) Reinhold Joest	Ford GT40	Ford 4.7L V8	D	341
7	P 3.0	35	(France) Equipe Matra – Elf	(Italy) Giovanni 'Nanni' Galli (United Kingdom) Robin Widdows	Matra-Simca MS630/650	Matra 3.0L V12	D	330
8	S 5.0	17	(United States) North American Racing Team	(Italy) Teodoro Zeccoli (United States) Sam Posey	Ferrari 275LM	Ferrari 3.3L V12	G	329
9	**S** **2.0**	**39**	**(France) C. Poirot** (private entrant)	**(France) Christian Poirot** **(France) Pierre Maublanc**	Porsche 910	Porsche 1991cc F6	D	312
10	**GT**; **2.0**	**41**	**(Belgium) J.-P. Gaban** (private entrant)	**(Belgium) Jean-Pierre Gaban** **(Belgium) Yves Deprez**	Porsche 911S	Porsche 1991cc F6	D	306
11	GT; 2.0	40	(France) Auguste Veuillet	(France) Claude Ballot-Léna (France) Guy Chasseuil	Porsche 911T	Porsche 1991cc F6	D	301
12	**P** **1.15**	**50**	**(France) Société des Automobiles Alpine**	**(France) Alain Serpaggi** **(France) Christian Ethuin**	Alpine A210	Renault-Gordini 1005cc S4	D	292
13	GT; 2.0	44	(France) C. Laurent (private entrant)	(France) Claude Laurent (France) Jacques Marché	Porsche 911T	Porsche 1991cc F6		287
14	GT; 2.0	67 (reserve)	(France) P. Farjon (private entrant)	(France) Philippe Farjon (France) Jacques Dechaumel	Porsche 911S	Porsche 1991cc F6	D	286

=== Did Not Finish ===
Pos	Class	No	Team	Drivers	Chassis	Engine	Tyre	Laps	Reason
DNF	S 5.0	12	(Germany) Porsche System Engineering	(United Kingdom) Vic Elford (United Kingdom) Richard Attwood	Porsche 917LH	Porsche 4.5L F12	D	327	Gearbox, clutch (22hr)
DNF	P 3.0	22	(Germany) Porsche System Engineering	(Austria) Rudi Lins (Germany) Willi Kauhsen	Porsche 908LH Coupé	Porsche 3.0L F8	D	317	Gearbox (22hr)
DNF	P 1.6	45	(France) Société des Automobiles Alpine	(France) Jean-Claude Killy (France) Bob Wollek	Alpine A210	Renault-Gordini 1470cc S4	D	242	Shock absorber mounting (20hr)
DNF	GT; 2.0	66 (reserve)	(France) J. Egreteaud (private entrant)	(France) Jean Edreteaud (France) Raymond Lopez	Porsche 911T	Porsche 1991cc F6		241	Accident (20hr)
DNF	P 3.0	18	(Italy) SpA Ferrari SEFAC	(Mexico) Pedro Rodriguez (United Kingdom) David Piper	Ferrari 312P Coupé	Ferrari 3.0L V12	F	223	Gearbox (16hr)
DNF	P 3.0	29	(France) Ecurie Savin-Calberson	(France) Patrick Depailler (France) Jean-Pierre Jabouille	Alpine A220/69	Renault-Gordini 3.0L V8	M	209	Conrod (18hr)
DNF	P 3.0	23	(Germany) Porsche System Engineering	(Germany) Udo Schütz (Germany) Gerhard Mitter	Porsche 908LH Coupé	Porsche 3.0L F8	D	199	Accident (14hr)
DNF	S 5.0	2	(Switzerland) Scuderia Filipinetti	(Sweden) Joakim 'Jo' Bonnier (United States) Masten Gregory	Lola T70 Mk.IIIB	Chevrolet 5.0L V8	F	196	Engine (13hr)
DNF	GT +2.0	1	(Switzerland) Scuderia Filipinetti	(France) Henri Greder (Sweden) Reine Wisell	Chevrolet Corvette C3	Chevrolet 7.0L V8	G	196	Gearbox (16hr)
DNF	GT; 2.0	63 (reserve)	(France) Marcel Martin (private entrant)	(France) René Mazzia (France) Pierre Mauroy	Porsche 911T	Porsche 1991cc F6		174	Gearbox (16hr)
DNF	P 3.0	31	(France) Société des Automobiles Alpine	(France) Jean-Pierre Nicolas (France) Jean-Luc Thérier	Alpine A220/68	Renault-Gordini 3.0L V8	D	160	Head gasket (12hr)
DNF	P 3.0	34	(France) Ecurie Matra – Elf	(France) Johnny Servoz-Gavin (Switzerland) Herbert Müller	Matra-Simca MS630/650	Matra 3.0L V12	D	158	Electrical (12hr)
DNF	S 5.0	14	(Germany) Porsche System Engineering	(Germany) Rolf Stommelen (Germany) Kurt Ahrens Jr.	Porsche 917LH	Porsche 4.5L F12	D	148	Oil leak (15hr)
DNF	P 3.0	28	(France) Société des Automobiles Alpine	(France) Jean Vinatier (France) André de Cortanze	Alpine A220/69	Renault-Gordini 3.0L V8	D	133	Oil pipe (12hr)
DNF	S 5.0	8	(United Kingdom) P. Sadler (private entrant)	(United Kingdom) Peter Sadler (United Kingdom) Paul Vestey	Ford GT40	Ford 4.7L V8	F	106	Electrical (10hr)
DNF	S 2.0	43	(United Kingdom) J. C. Bamford Excavators Ltd	(United Kingdom) Roger Enever (United Kingdom) Peter Brown	Chevron B8	BMW 1991cc S4		100	Piston (8hr)
DNF	P 1.3	49	(France) Trophée Le Mans Alpine	(France) Jacques Foucteau (France) Patrice Compain	Alpine A210	Renault-Gordini 1296cc S4		97	Chassis / suspension (10hr)
DNF	P 2.0	38	(Belgium) Racing Team VDS	(Belgium) Gustave 'Taf' Gosselin (Belgium) Claude Bourgoignie	Alfa Romeo T33/B	Alfa Romeo 1996cc V8	D	76	Accident (8hr)
DNF	P 3.0	20	(Switzerland) Hart Ski Racing (Germany) Porsche System Engineering	(Switzerland) Jo Siffert (United Kingdom) Brian Redman	Porsche 908/02LH	Porsche 3.0L F8	F	60	Gearbox (6hr)
DNF	P 3.0	30	(France) Société des Automobiles Alpine	(France) Jean-Claude Andruet (France) Henri Grandsire	Alpine A220/69	Renault-Gordini 3.0L V8	M	48	Head gasket (6hr)
DNF	S 5.0	9	(United Kingdom) Alan Mann Racing Ltd.	(Australia) Frank Gardner (United Kingdom) Malcolm Guthrie	Ford GT40	Ford 4.9L V8	G	42	Driveshaft (6hr)
DSQ	GT +2.0	59 (reserve)	(Switzerland) Scuderia Filipinetti	(Switzerland) Claude Haldi (Switzerland) Jacques Rey	Ferrari 275 GTB; Competizione	Ferrari 3.3L V12	G	39	Premature oil replenishment (5hr)
DNF	P 3.0	36	(Belgium) Racing Team VDS	(Belgium) Teddy Pilette (Netherlands) Rob Slotemaker	Alfa Romeo T33/B	Alfa Romeo 2.5L V8	D	36	Oil pressure (5hr)
DNF	GT; 2.0	42	(Switzerland) Wicky Racing Team (private entrant)	(Switzerland) André Wicky (Switzerland) Edgar Berney	Porsche 911T	Porsche 1991cc F6	D	34	Piston (4hr)
DNF	P 2.0	62 (reserve)	(United Kingdom) M. Konig (private entrant)	(United Kingdom) Mark Konig (United Kingdom) Tony Lanfranchi	Nomad Mk 2	BRM 1998cc V8	D	28	Gearbox (4hr)
DNF	P 2.0	37	(United Kingdom) Donald Healey Motor Company	(United Kingdom) Clive Baker (United Kingdom) Jeff Harris	Healey SR	Coventry Climax 1998cc V8	D	14	Radiator (4hr)
DNF	P 1.15	51	Ecurie Fiat-Abarth France	(Italy) Maurizio Zanetti (Italy) Ugo Locatelli	Abarth 1000SP	Abarth 1001cc S4	D	9	Ignition (2hr)
DNF	P 2.0	60 (reserve)	(France) Robert Buchet (private entrant)	(France) Jean de Mortemart (France) Jean Mésange	Porsche 910	Porsche 1991cc F6	D	4	Engine (2hr)
DNF	P 1.6	46	(France) Ecurie Savin-Calberson	(France) Alain LeGuellec (France) Bernard Tramont	Alpine A210	Renault-Gordini 1470cc S4	M	1	Head gasket (2hr)
DNF	P 3.0	19	(Italy) SpA Ferrari SEFAC	(New Zealand) Chris Amon (Switzerland) Peter Schetty	Ferrari 312P Coupe	Ferrari 3.0L V12	F	0	Accident / fire (1hr)
DNF	S 5.0	10	(United Kingdom) John Woolfe Racing (private entrant)	(United Kingdom) John Woolfe (Germany) Herbert Linge	Porsche 917	Porsche 4.5L F12	D	0	Accident (fatal) (1hr)

=== Did Not Start ===
Pos	Class	No	Team	Drivers	Chassis	Engine	Reason
DNS	S 5.0	15	(Germany) Porsche System Engineering	(Germany) Herbert Linge (United Kingdom) Brian Redman (Austria) Rudi Lins	Porsche 917LH	Porsche 4.5L F12	Spare car
DNS	S 5.0	16	(United States) North American Racing Team	(United States) Sam Posey (United States) Bob Grossman	Ferrari 365 GTB/4 Daytona	Ferrari 4.4L V12	Practice accident
DNQ	P 1.3	58 (reserve)	(France) Ecurie ASA – ESCA	(France) Jean-Pierre Hanrioud (Switzerland) Dominique Martin	Ford GT40	Ford 4.9L V8	Engine
DNS	S 2.0	61 (reserve)	(United States) North American Racing Team	(France) Robert Mieusset (Mexico) Ricardo Rodriguez Cavazos	Dino 206 S	Ferrari 1986cc V6	Practice accident
DNQ	P 1.3	47	(United Kingdom) Unipower Cars	(United Kingdom) Piers Forrester (United Kingdom) Stanley Robinson	Unipower GT	BMC 1293cc S4	Did not qualify
DNQ	P 1.3	48	(United Kingdom) Piper Cars Ltd	(United Kingdom) Tim Lalonde (United Kingdom) John Burton	Piper GTR	Ford 1300cc S4	Did not qualify
DNA	S 5.0	57 (reserve)	(United Kingdom) Lola Cars Ltd	(Sweden) Ulf Norinder	Lola T70 Mk. III	Chevrolet 5.0 L V8	Did not arrive
DNA	P 1.15	69 (reserve)	(France) J.Bourdon (private entrant)	(France) Jacques Bourdon (France) Christian Ethuin	Alpine A210	Renault-Gordini 1005cc S4	Did not arrive

=== Class Winners ===
Class	Prototype Winners		Class	Sports Winners		Class	GT Winners	
Prototype 3000	#64 Porsche 908 LH	Herrmann / Larrousse *	Sports >2000	#6 Ford GT40	Ickx / Oliver *	Grand Touring >2000	no finishers	
Prototype 2000	#39 Porsche 910	Poirot / Maublanc	Sports 2000	no finishers		Grand Touring 2000	#41 Porsche 911 S	Gaban / Deprez
Prototype 1600	no finishers		Sports 1600	no entrants		Grand Touring 1600	no entrants	
Prototype 1300	no finishers		Sports 1300	no entrants		Grand Touring 1300	no entrants	
Prototype 1150	#50 Alpine A210	Serpaggi / Ethuin *	Sports 1150	no entrants		Grand Touring 1150	no entrants	

- Note: setting a new Distance Record.

=== Index of Thermal Efficiency ===
Pos	Class	No	Team	Drivers	Chassis	Score
1	S 5.0	6	(United Kingdom) JW Automotive; Engineering	(Belgium) Jacky Ickx (United Kingdom) Jackie Oliver	Ford GT40	1.23
2	S 5.0	7	(United Kingdom) JW Automotive; Engineering	(United Kingdom) David Hobbs (United Kingdom) Mike Hailwood	Ford GT40	1.22
3	S 5.0	68	(Germany) Deutsche Auto Zeitung	(Germany) Helmut Kelleners (Germany) Reinhold Joest	Ford GT40	1.18
4	P 1.15	50	(France) Société Automobiles; Alpine	(France) Alain Serpaggi (France) Christian Ethuin	Alpine A210	1.12
5=	P 3.0	33	(France) Equipe Matra – Elf	(France) Jean-Pierre Beltoise (United Kingdom) Piers Courage	Matra-Simca MS650	0.96
5=	GT; 2.0	40	(France) Auguste Veuillet	(France) Claude Ballot-Léna (France) Guy Chasseuil	Porsche 911T	0.96
7	GT; 2.0	41	(Belgium) J.-P. Gaban (private entrant)	(Belgium) Jean-Pierre Gaban (Belgium) Yves Deprez	Porsche 911S	0.93
8	P 3.0	32	(France) Equipe Matra – Elf	(France) Jean Guichet (Italy) Nino Vaccarella	Matra-Simca MS630	0.91
9	GT; 2.0	44	(France) C. Laurent (private entrant)	(France) Claude Laurent (France) Jacques Marché	Porsche 911T	0.87

- Note: Only the top nine positions are included in this set of standings.

=== Index of Performance ===
Taken from Moity's book.

Pos	Class	No	Team	Drivers	Chassis	Score
1	P 1.15	50	(France) Société Automobiles; Alpine	(France) Alain Serpaggi (France) Christian Ethuin	Alpine A210	1.282
2	P 3.0	64	(Germany) Porsche System; Engineering	(Germany) Hans Herrmann (France) Gérard Larrousse	Porsche 908LH Coupé	1.278
3	P 3.0	33	(France) Equipe Matra – Elf	(France) Jean-Pierre Beltoise (United Kingdom) Piers Courage	Matra-Simca MS650	1.265
5	P 3.0	32	(France) Equipe Matra – Elf	(France) Jean Guichet (Italy) Nino Vaccarella	Matra-Simca MS630	1.236
5	S 5.0	6	(United Kingdom) JW Automotive; Engineering	(Belgium) Jacky Ickx (United Kingdom) Jackie Oliver	Ford GT40	1.220
6	S 5.0	7	(United Kingdom) JW Automotive; Engineering	(United Kingdom) David Hobbs (United Kingdom) Mike Hailwood	Ford GT40	1.209
7	S 2.0	39	(France) C. Poirot (private entrant)	(France) Christian Poirot (France) Pierre Maublanc	Porsche 910	1.139
8	P 3.0	35	(France) Equipe Matra – Elf	(Italy) 'Nanni' Galli (United Kingdom) Robin Widdows	Matra-Simca MS630/650	1.137
9	S 5.0	68	(Germany) Deutsche Auto Zeitung	(Germany) Helmut Kelleners (Germany) Reinhold Joest	Ford GT40	1.124
10	GT; 2.0	41	(Belgium) J.-P. Gaban (private entrant)	(Belgium) Jean-Pierre Gaban (Belgium) Yves Deprez	Porsche 911S	1.120

- Note: Only the top ten positions are included in this set of standings. A score of 1.00 means meeting the minimum distance for the car, and a higher score is exceeding the nominal target distance.

=== Statistics ===
Taken from Quentin Spurring's book, officially licensed by the ACO

- Fastest Lap in practice – R. Stommelen, #14 Porsche 917 LH – 3:22.9secs; 238.98 km/h (148.50 mph)
- Fastest Lap – V. Elford, #12 Porsche 917 LH – 3:27.2secs; 234.02 km/h (145.41 mph)
- Winning Distance – 4,998.00 km (3,105.61 mi)
- Winner's Average Speed – 208.25 km/h (129.40 mph)
- Attendance – almost 400 000

=== International Championship for Makes Standings ===
As calculated after Le Mans, Round 8 of 10

Pos	Manufacturer	Points
1	(West Germany) Porsche	45
2	(United States) Ford	24
3	(United Kingdom) Lola	14
4	(Italy) Ferrari	15
5=	(United Kingdom) Chevron	3
5=	(France) Matra	3
7	(Italy) Alfa Romeo	3
8	(France) Alpine-Renault	1

Citations

== In media ==
La Ronde Infernale: Le Mans 1969 (commissioned by Castrol)
