= Reinhold Joest =

German racing driver

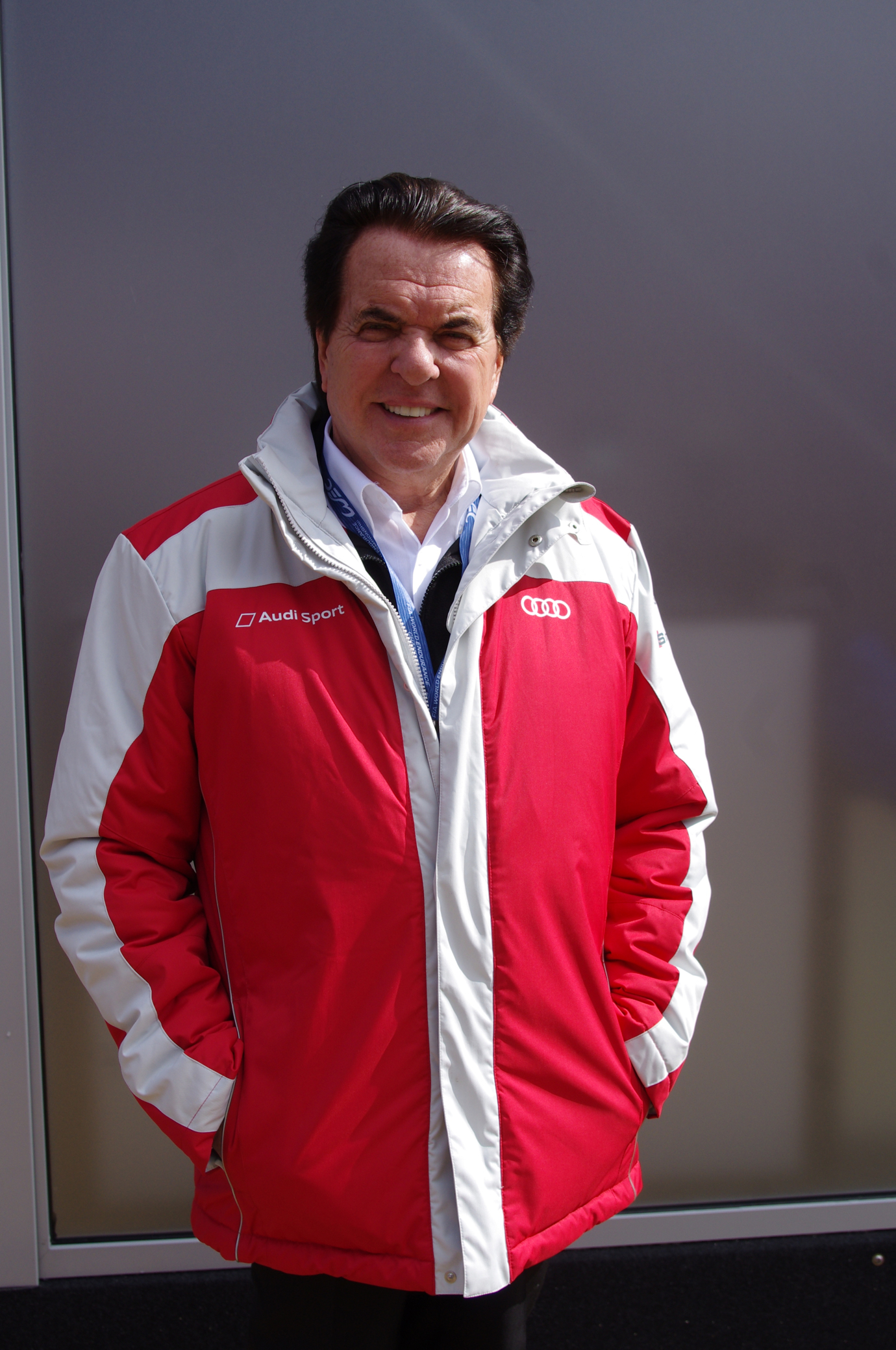
- Joest at the 2013 6 Hours of Silverstone
- Nationality: (Germany) German
- Born: April 24, 1937 (age 89)

24 Hours of Le Mans career
- Years: 1969, 1971 - 1973, 1975 - 1976, 1980 - 1981
- Teams: Deutsche Auto Zeitung, Martini Racing, Jo Siffert A.T.E. Racing, Joest Racing
- Best finish: 2nd (1980)
- Class wins: 0

Reinhold Joest (also spelt Reinhold Jöst; born 24 April 1937) is a former German race car driver and current team owner. During the last 25 years, Joest Racing has won the 24 Hours of Le Mans fifteen times.

== Driving career ==
Joest's driving career began in 1962 in a local hillclimb race in the Odenwald mountains. He had won two German championships in that category by 1967. Since 1966, he raced successfully on the Nürburgring, scoring a class win at the 1000 km Nürburgring. He won the race overall twice, in 1970 and 1980, and a total five class wins. In 1978, he also won the European Sportscar Championship.

Joest raced in the 24 Hours of Le Mans nine times between 1969 and 1981. Joest's first entry was in a Ford GT40 co-driven by Helmut Kelleners and sponsored by a German car magazine. His first remarkable result came in 1972, after the dominating Porsche 917 and similar cars were not allowed anymore. Without any modern cars available, Joest borrowed an outdated 3.0 L Porsche 908/02 Langheck Coupé from the Jo Siffert Museum. He and his two co-drivers finished third with the 1969 model car. Despite being part of factory Porsche teams on several occasions, he never managed to be in their winning car. His best result was a second place finish in 1980 together with Jacky Ickx in his privately entered Porsche 936 that was called a "Porsche 908/80" as Porsche did not officially sell the 936.

Despite never winning as a driver at Le Mans, Joest ended his driving career in style. After winning the 24 Hours of Daytona in a Porsche 935 and on the Nürburgring with his Porsche 908/3 Turbo in 1980 (both with Rolf Stommelen), he went on to win several German DRM races in 1981 with a mighty Porsche 935 "Moby Dick". He retired after winning the Kyalami 9 Hours with Jochen Mass at the end of the year.

=== Complete 24 Hours of Le Mans results ===
Year	Team	Co-Drivers	Car	Class	Laps	Pos.	Class Pos.
1969	(Germany) Deutsche Auto Zeitung	(Germany) Helmut Kelleners	Ford GT40 Mk.I	S 5.0	341	6th	3rd
1971	(Germany) Martini Racing Team	(Germany) Willi Kauhsen	Porsche 917/20	S 5.0	180	DNF	DNF
1972	(Germany) Jo Siffert A.T.E. Racing	(Italy) Mario Casoni (Germany) Michel Weber	Porsche 908LH	S 3.0	325	3rd	3rd
1973	(Germany) Martini Racing Team	(Switzerland) Claude Haldi	Porsche 911 Carrera RSR	S 3.0	54	DNF	DNF
1975	(Germany) Ovoro Joest Racing	(Italy) Mario Casoni (Germany) Jürgen Barth	Porsche 908LH	S 3.0	325	4th	4th
1976	(Germany) Martini Racing Joest	(Germany) Jürgen Barth	Porsche 936 Spyder	S 3.0		DNF	DNF
1978	(Germany) Martini Racing Porsche System	(United States) Peter Gregg (United States) Hurley Haywood	Porsche 936/77	S +2.0	362	3rd	3rd
1980	(Germany) Equipe Liqui Moly – Martini Racing	(Belgium) Jacky Ickx	Porsche 908/80	S +2.0	336	2nd	2nd
1981	(Germany) Joest Racing	(United States) Dale Whittington (Germany) Klaus Niedzwiedz	Porsche 908	S+2.0	60	39th	10th

== See also ==
- Joest Racing
