= Herbert Linge =

German racing driver (1928–2024)

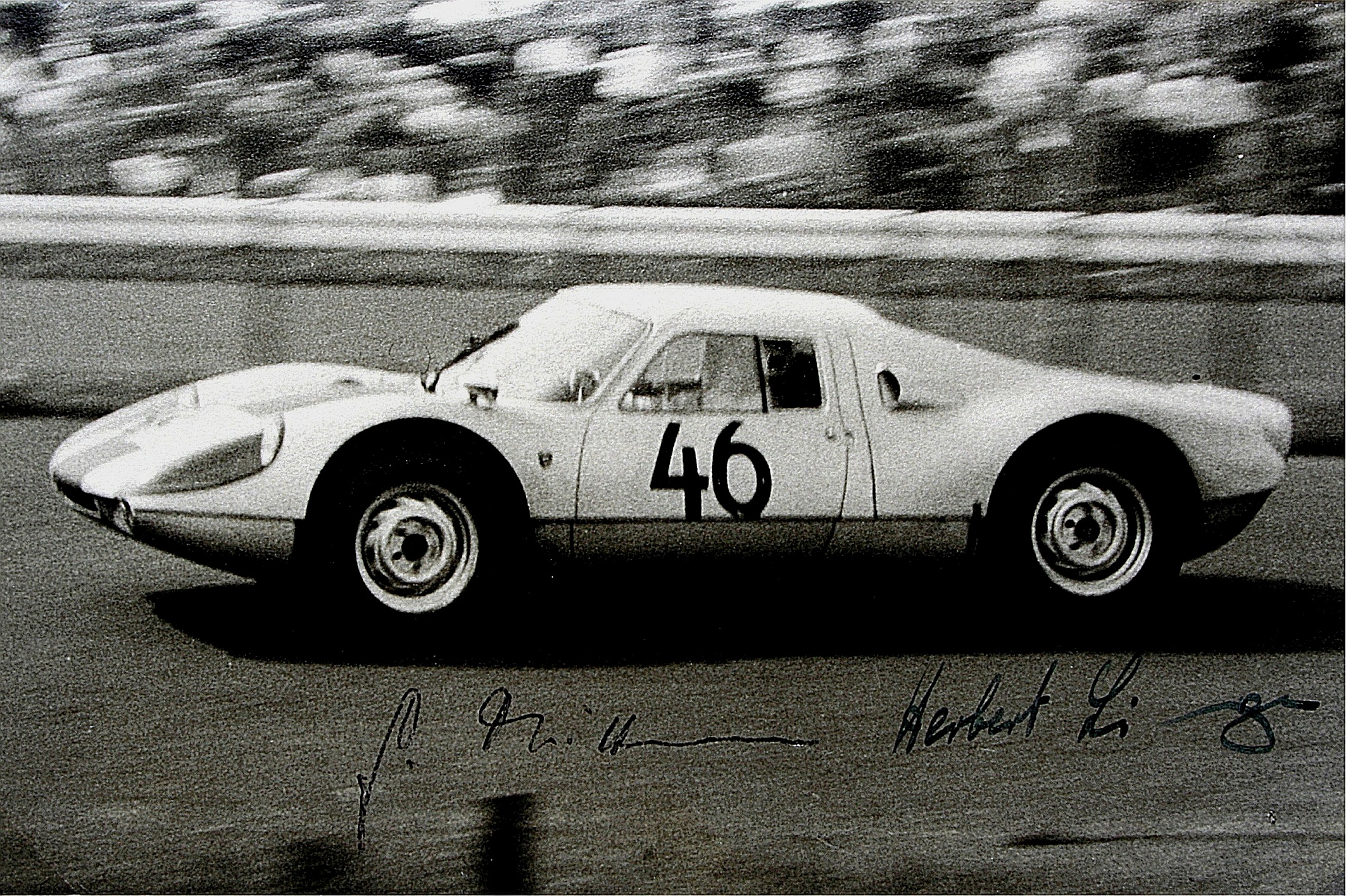
Linge with Porsche 904 at the Nürburgring 1964

Herbert Fritz Linge (11 June 1928 – 5 January 2024) was a German racing and rally driver. As an employee of Porsche, he was involved in many events, and later also in motorsport safety.

== Life and career ==
Herbert Linge was born on 11 June 1928.

Linge took part in many 24 Hours of Le Mans races in the 1960s, even with a Porsche 917. He became famous for being the co-driver of Hans Herrmann in the 1954 Mille Miglia, when their low Porsche 550 passed under a closed railroad crossing, with both ducking under the dashboard. In 1960, Linge won the Tour de Corse rally in a Porsche SC 90. He is still the only German to win the event.

The Deutscher Motor Sport Bund's DMSB-Staffel, founded in 1972 by Linge for the Oberste Nationale Sportbehörde as ONS-Staffel, is considered the first mobile track marshalling crew, equipped with fast cars like the Porsche 914 or Porsche 911, carrying fire extinguishers and doctors in order to arrive quickly at a crash site.

Linge died on 5 January 2024, at the age of 95.

== Official Results ==
=== 24 Hours of Le Mans ===
Year	Team	Co-Drivers	Car	Class	Laps	Pos	Class Pos
1958	(Netherlands) Baron de Beaufort	(Netherlands) Carel Godin de Beaufort	Porsche 550A	S 1.5	288	5	2
1960	(Germany) Porsche KG	(Germany) Hans Walter	Porsche 356 B Carrera GTL Abarth	GT 1.6	269	10	1
1961	(Germany) Porsche KG	(Netherlands) Ben Pon	Porsche 356 B Carrera GTL Abarth	GT 1.6	284	10	1
1963	(Germany) Porsche System Engineering	(Germany) Edgar Barth	Porsche 718/8 W-RS Spyder	P 2.0	300	8	1
1964	(Germany) Porsche System Engineering	(Germany) Edgar Barth	Porsche 904/8	P 2.0	139	DNF	DNF
1965	(Germany) Porsche System Engineering	(Germany) Peter Nöcker	Porsche 904/6	P 2.0	336	4	1
1966	(Germany) Porsche System Engineering	(Germany) Hans Herrmann	Porsche 906/6 LH	P 2.0	338	5	2
1967	(France) Auguste Veuillet	(France) Robert Buchet	Porsche 911 S	GT 2.0	308	14	1
1968	(France) P. Farjon	(France) Robert Buchet	Porsche 907/8	P 3.0	102	DSQ	DSQ
1969	(United Kingdom) John Woolfe Racing	(United Kingdom) John Woolfe	Porsche 917	S 5.0	0	DNF	DNF
1969	(Germany) Porsche System Engineering	(United Kingdom) Brian Redman (Austria) Rudi Lins	Porsche 917LH	S 5.0		DNS	DNS
1970	(United States) Solar Productions	(United States) Jonathan Williams	Porsche 908/2 (Camera Car)	P 3.0	282	N/C	N/C
