= Helmut Kelleners =

German racing driver

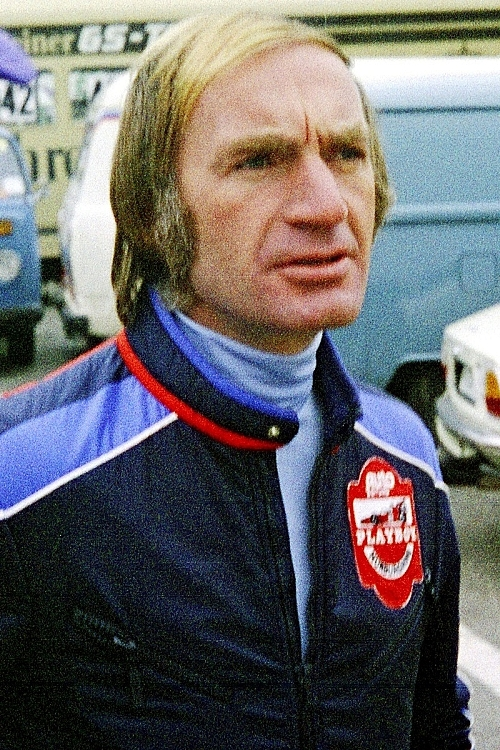
Helmut Kelleners in 1975

Helmut Franz Kelleners (born 29 December 1939 in Moers) is a German former race driver. He is a three-time winner of the European Touring Car Championship.

Kelleners has won the Spa 24 Hours (1968 and 1970) and the 24 Hours Nürburgring (1972). Having won the European Touring Car Championship in 1980 with Siegfried Müller Jr., from 1981 to 1982 Kelleners formed a successful partnership with Italian driver Umberto Grano, securing three consecutive editions of the European Touring Car Championship at the wheel of a BMW.

His son Ralf Kelleners is also a race car driver.

== Career ==
- Spa 24 Hours
- Joest Racing
- 1000 km Nürburgring
- 24 Hours Nürburgring
- 1970 24 Hours of Le Mans
- 1969 24 Hours of Le Mans

Preceded by Martino Finotto and Carlo Facetti	European Touring Car Championship champion 1980-1982 with Siegfried Müller Jr. (1980) and Umberto Grano (1981-82)	Succeeded by Dieter Quester
