= Mulsanne Straight =

Road section of the 24 Hours of Le Mans

Coordinates: 47°56′27″N 0°14′7″E

Circuit map

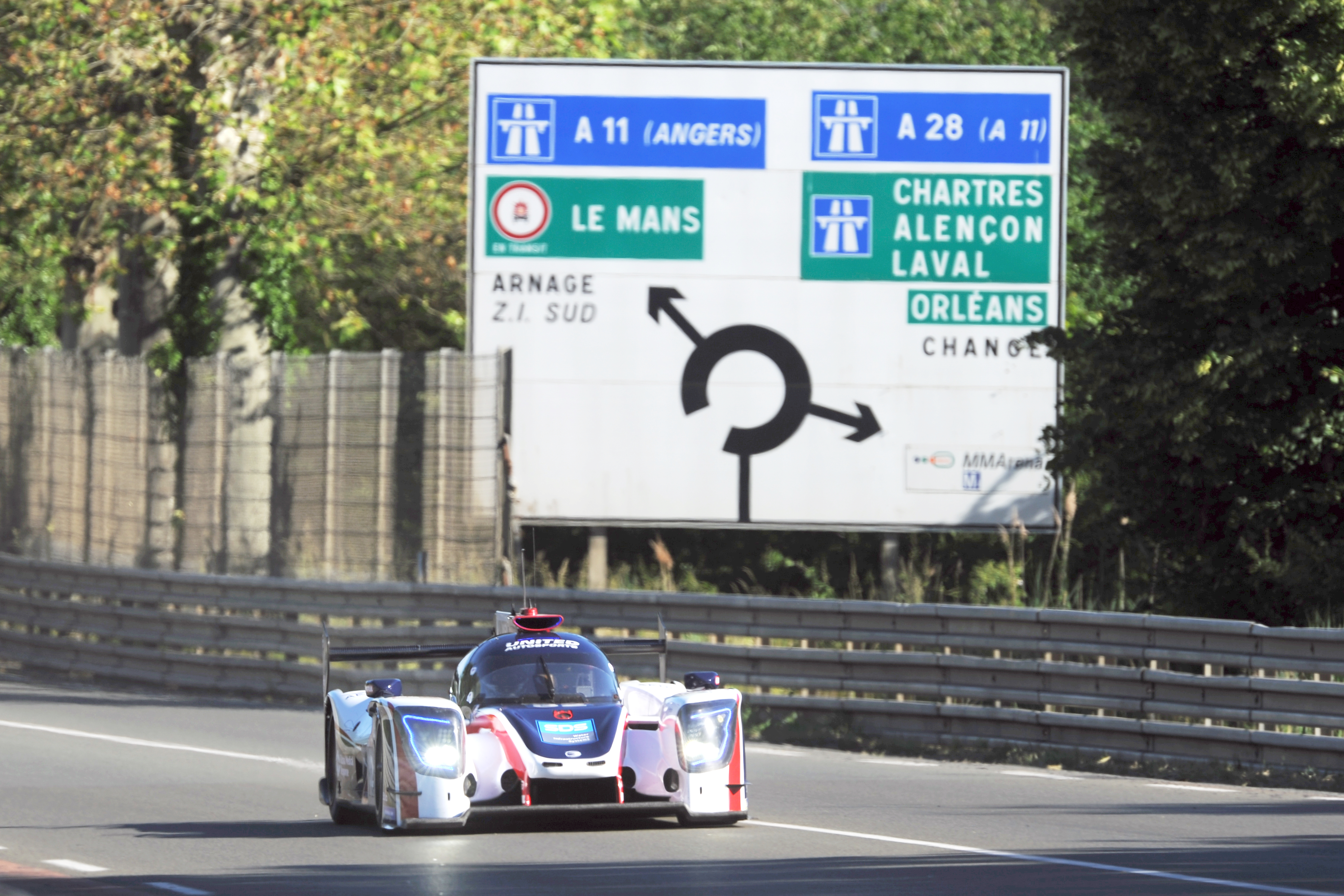
Part of the Mulsanne straight.

The Mulsanne Straight (French: Ligne droite des Hunaudières, "Straight Line of Les Hunaudières") is the name used in English for a formerly 6 km (3.7 mi) long straight of the Circuit de la Sarthe around which the 24 Hours of Le Mans auto race takes place. Since 1990, the straight is interrupted by two chicanes, with the last section (that includes a slight right turn known as the "Kink") leading to a sharp corner near the village of Mulsanne. Before the chicanes were added, the Mulsanne Straight was the longest straight section of any race track in the world.

== French name ==
When races are not taking place, the Mulsanne Straight is part of the national road system of France. It is called the Ligne droite des Hunaudières, a part of the route départementale RD 338 (formerly Route Nationale RN 138) in the Sarthe department. The Hunaudières leads to the village of Mulsanne, its English namesake (though the French Route de Mulsanne is the name for the road between Mulsanne and Arnage, with the Indianapolis corner in between).

== History ==
After quite different early layouts, the Le Mans circuit similar to the well known and current one was only introduced for the 1921 French Grand Prix, but at the time with a triangle section well within the modern-day city. After entering the town from the modern-day pit area along the Rue de Laigne, and making a U-turn (later two righthanders), the cars left the town on Avenue Georges Durand towards Mulsanne. This triangle was also used for the first 1923 24 Hours of Le Mans, later 24h races, and the 1929 French Grand Prix, with the 1931 24 Hours of Le Mans being the last than ran into the city, and back out of it. For the 1932 24 Hours of Le Mans, a bypass was built outside of the town. It turned right after the pits, ran through the Esses and rejoined the old layout at the Tertre Rouge righthander.

After exiting the Tertre Rouge corner, cars would spend almost half of the lap at full throttle, before braking for the right-hand Mulsanne Corner. The Porsche 917 longtail with its 4.9-litre flat-12 engine, used from 1969 to 1971, reached 362 km/h (225 mph). 5-litre sportscars were banned after 1971. Prototype engine size was 3 litres since 1968. Top speeds dropped until powerful turbocharged engines, pioneered at Le Mans by manufacturers Renault and Porsche, were allowed; the 1978 Porsche 935 was clocked at 367 km/h (228 mph).

The 1980s Group C prototypes were mainly regulated by fuel consumption. Speeds on the straight reached over 400 km/h (250 mph) during the late 1980s. At the beginning of the 1988 24 Hours of Le Mans race, Paris garage owner Roger Dorchy drove for Welter Racing in a car dubbed the WM P88. The P88 belonged to a program known as "Project 400" and was powered by a 2.8-litre turbocharged Peugeot PRV V6 engine, which had insufficient reliability for lasting 24 hours. Instead, they went for the top speed record, and the car was out after just 53 laps (about 4 hours) with turbo, cooling and electrical failures. It was measured by radar travelling at 405 km/h (252 mph), an all-time race record speed.

There were several fatal high-speed accidents on the Mulsanne Straight in the 1980s. Jean-Louis Lafosse was killed in 1981, and Jo Gartner in 1986; in 1984 a French track marshal was killed in an accident at the Kink involving the two Aston Martin Nimrod NRA/C2s of British driver John Sheldon and his American teammate Drake Olson. One driver had an extremely lucky escape in 1986: a tyre on British driver Win Percy's 7.0 litre V12-powered Jaguar XJR-6 exploded at 386 km/h (240 mph), tearing off the rear bodywork and flipping the car into the air "up above the trees". The wreckage finally came to rest 600 m (2,000 ft) down the road. Although the vehicle was almost obliterated, Percy somehow walked away from the crash with nothing more than a badly battered helmet.

=== Addition of chicanes ===
The 6 km (3.7 mi) Mulsanne Straight caused tyre and engine failures, as cars reached speeds near and above 400 km/h (250 mph) before braking hard for the sharp right turn at its end. So two chicanes were added to the straight before the 1990 race to limit the achievable maximum speed and because the FIA decreed it would no longer sanction a circuit with a straight longer than 2 km (1.2 mi), which is roughly the length of the Döttinger Höhe straight on the Nürburgring Nordschleife. Since their installation, most leading cars have topped out around 330 km/h (205 mph) during qualifying and 320 km/h (199 mph) during the race.

In the 2025 race, 349 km/h (217 mph) was the highest peak speed recorded, on the 64th lap clocked by Antonio Giovinazzi in the #51 Ferrari 499P, thus in a Le Mans Hypercar car limited in many aspects by Balance of power.

The highest speed on the Straight since 1990 was achieved by a Nissan R90CK driven by Mark Blundell, which reached 366 km/h (227 mph) during qualifying when the twin-turbo system's wastegate was stuck shut, leading the engine to produce well over its regular output of 800 bhp. The exact power increase remains unknown.

== Spectator access ==
In the past, spectators could obtain magnificent views of cars racing along the straight during the Le Mans, including while dining at various restaurants—such as Restaurant de 24 Heures and Les Virages de L'Arche—located very close to the road. However, in 1990, the viewing experience obtained at both restaurants was diminished with the introduction of the chicanes.

Today, due to safety concerns, spectators are kept well away from the edge of the straight by marshals and police, and while dining guests can still hear the cars pass, their view is obscured by green covers attached to the safety fencing.

== Namesake ==
Three Bentley cars are named after the straight and nearby villages: the Mulsanne, the Arnage, and the Hunaudières concept car.

GM offered its 1970 Corvette in a color named Mulsanne blue.
