= 1971 24 Hours of Le Mans =

39th 24 Hours of Le Mans endurance race

Previous: 1970	Next: 1972
Index: Races | Winners

The 1971 24 Hours of Le Mans was the 39th Grand Prix of Endurance, and took place on 12 and 13 June 1971. It was the ninth round of the 1971 International Championship for Makes.

This year was the final of the races with 5-litre engines; the incoming regulations put a 3-litre limit on engine capacity for Group 5 Sports Cars. The weekend saw extended good weather and produced the fastest race in the event's history, setting a record that would stand for almost 40 years.

Although there were few accidents this year, there were many cars delayed or forced to retire with mechanical problems and only twelve cars were classified at the finish. Winners, at a record speed, were Gijs van Lennep and Helmut Marko in their Team Martini Porsche 917.

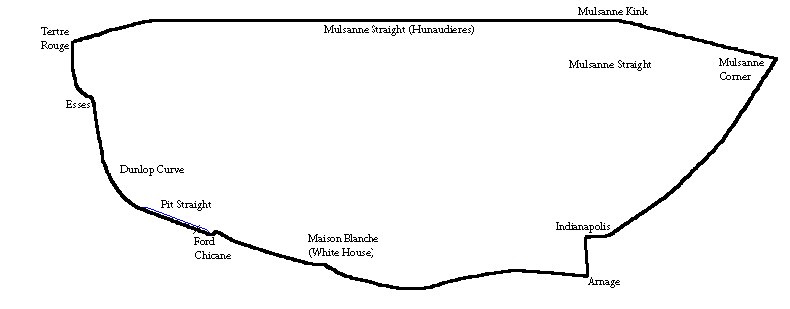
Le Mans in 1971

== Regulations ==
With the imminent ban of engines over 3-litres for the upcoming 1972 season, the FIA made no changes to their standing regulations. The Automobile Club de l'Ouest (ACO) likewise made very few changes. The experiment of the standing-start in echelon from the previous year was discarded. A 2-by-2 rolling start behind a safety car became the most preferred way, which remains the tradition up to the modern day. This allowed an Armco guardrail to be erected between the pits and the main straight, greatly increasing the safety of the pit-crews. Drivers were also now permitted to stay in their cars during refuelling.

On race-week plans were unveiled for an extensive realignment of the circuit, making it self-contained. It included a new Mulsanne straight alongside the public highway and a new series of curves to cut out the dangerous Maison Blanche corner – the scene of many major race accidents over the years.

This year, first prize for outright victory was US$13000 – barely the cost of a top-tier racing engine, and not reflecting the huge preparation and work required. But such was the stature of the race it kept drawing strong fields. Finally, after 14 years, the ban on female drivers was lifted with the ACO accepting top French rally-driver Marie-Claude Beaumont in the Greder Corvette entry – the first female driver at Le Mans since 1951.

== Entries ==
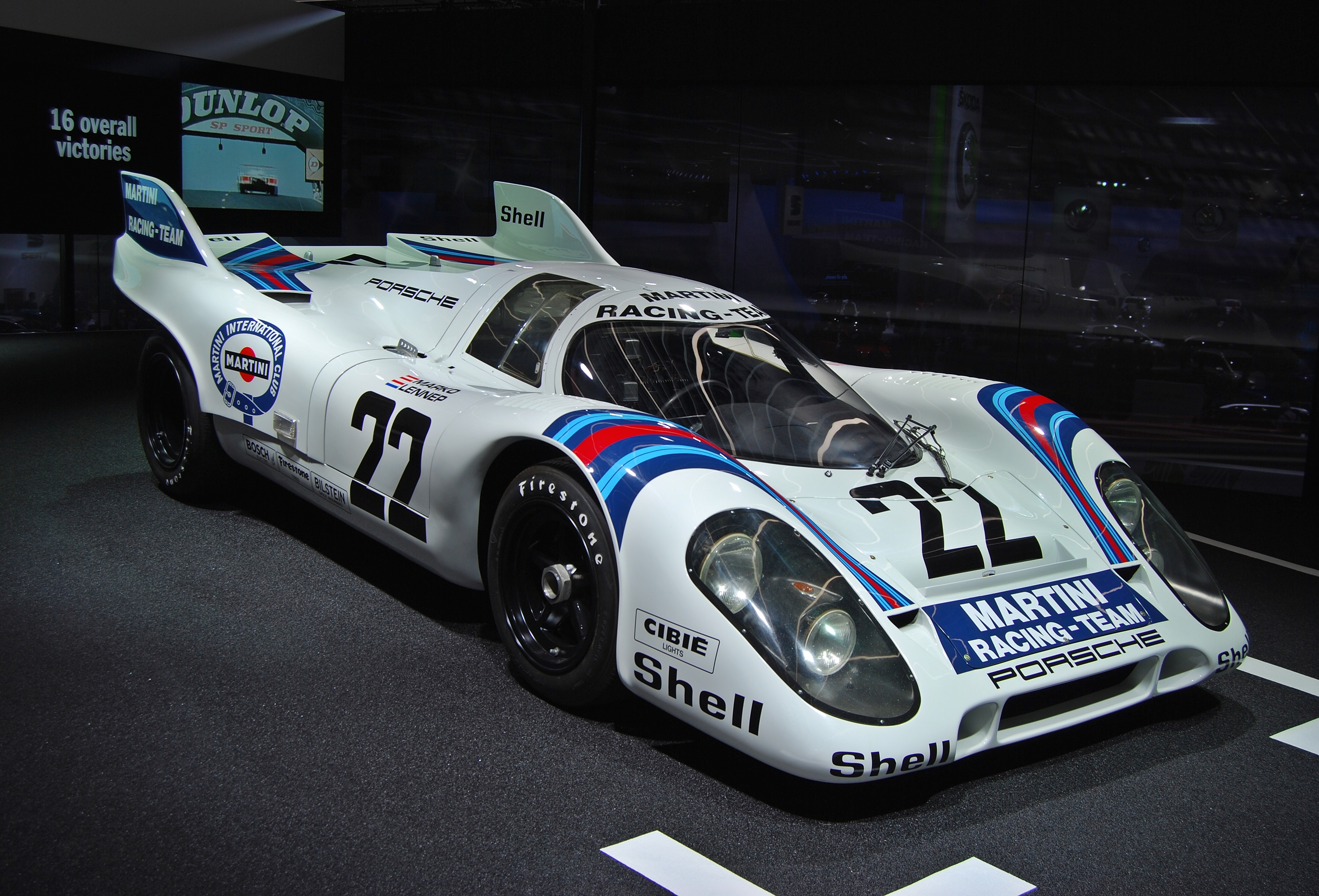
The race winning Porsche 917K of Helmut Marko and Gijs van Lennep

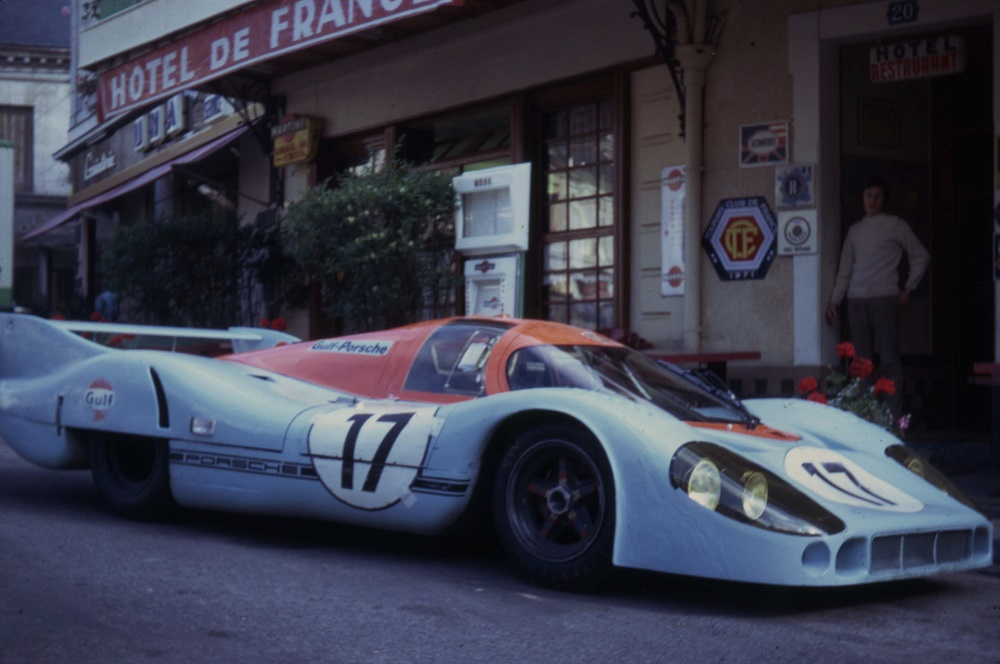
1971 Le Mans Porsche 917LH driven by Derek Bell & Jo Siffert parked outside the Hotel de France

The ACO received 80 entries for the race, which it reduced to 63 for qualifying, though only 53 cars arrived to practice. Noticeable was the very low turnout from manufacturers' works teams. Given the dominance of the big Sports Cars on fast tracks like Le Mans, there were few Prototypes entered. Ferrari and Alfa Romeo withdrew their works teams to concentrate on next year's models. However, a vast fleet of privateer Porsche 911s arrived to fill the gap, making the GT category the strongest-supported group.

Category	Prototype Group 6	Sports Group 5	GT Groups 3+4	Total Entries
Large-engines >2.0L classes	6 (+1 reserve)	16 (+2 reserves)	16 (+5 reserves)	38 (+8 reserve)
Medium-engines < 2.0L classes	2	0	4 (+1 reserve)	6 (+1 reserve)
Total Cars	8 (+1 reserve)	16 (+2 reserves)	20 (+6 reserves)	44 (+9 reserves)

Over the winter, extensive development work was done on the 917L (langheck or 'long-tail'). Using the French SERA aerodynamics laboratory, the chassis was further streamlined. Now running 17" rear tyres made its handling almost as good as the K-version (kurzheck or 'short-tail') much to the drivers' satisfaction. Porsche also supplied a slightly larger 5.0-litre engine (vs 4.9L) using high-performance nickel-silicon cylinder-liners from NSU that improved oil consumption and reduced wear. This pushed its output up to 620 bhp. It also came with a new 4-speed gearbox, but as all the teams chose to use the tried-and-tested 5-speed gearbox the new engines were not used either.

With four victories to date in the 1971 Championship, the JW Automotive team were favourites for outright victory. They certainly had the strongest driver line-up with Pedro Rodriguez/Jackie Oliver and by Jo Siffert and Derek Bell in langhecks. Their third team car, a 917K, was driven by 1970 race-winner Richard Attwood with Herbert Müller.

The cars and equipment of the previous year's successful Porsche Salzburg team was purchased for the Martini Racing Team by Conte Gregorio Rossi di Montelera (of the Martini & Rossi company). They entered three cars – a long-tail for Vic Elford/Gérard Larrousse (winners at Sebring and the Nürburgring) and a magnesium-alloy chassis short-tail for Gijs van Lennep/Helmut Marko. (JWA was not offered these experimental options) The third was an experimental short-tail version. The 917/20 was built as a test-bed for future Can-Am parts and aerodynamic low-drag concepts. Shorter and much wider than the 917K, it was designed and tested by Robert Choulet and the SERA wind tunnel, after their other work on the 917. Nicknamed "the Pig" by the company, it was driven by Reinhold Joest/Willi Kauhsen. Following up the psychedelic paintjob of their car the previous year Martini, with tongue in cheek, had the chunky car painted in pink for the race with names of pieces of meat written across it.

After the 1970 race, Ferrari set about improving the 512. Widened by 100mm, with an improved and lightened aerodynamic chassis, the V12 engine was also uprated to produce 580 bhp. The new version, the 512M (modificato) debuted at the end of the 1970 season with a win to Ickx/Giunti. The 512M modifications were offered to the customer teams, but not applied to the works cars as Ferrari had decided to give up any official effort with the 512 in order to prepare the new 312PB for 1972.

Between them, the customer teams put up a competent challenge to Porsche. The North American Racing Team (NART) had three entries. The Penske team, very competitive at the American rounds of the championship, arrived on one of the NART entry tickets. Their chassis was made by Holman & Moody and the engine prepared by Can-Am V8 specialist Traco (claiming 614 bhp). A number of quick-change modifications were added for wheels, brakes and refuelling to save valuable minutes in the pits. The blue, Sunoco-sponsored, car was driven by Mark Donohue/David Hobbs. The regular NART 512M also had a Traco engine and was driven by Sam Posey/Tony Adamowicz. And there was an open-top, spyder, version was for Masten Gregory/George Eaton.

The Scuderia Filipinetti also entered a much-modified Ferrari. Known as the "512F", it was designed by former Ferrari racing engineer/driver Mike Parkes it had a bigger rear-wing and used the Porsche 917 windscreen which was 120mm narrower, allowing for better water- and oil-cooler placement. With regular co-driver Jo Bonnier unavailable for personal reason, Henri Pescarolo was brought in as his co-driver. José Juncadella of Escuderia Montjuich had employed 1964-winner Nino Vaccarella. Ecurie Francorchamps, Georg Loos and Corrado Manfredini also returned with their modified cars. David Piper's entry was used by American privateer David Weir who had bought the spare car off Steve McQueen's Solar Productions film company.

Just after the 1970 Le Mans, Chrysler completed the takeover of Simca creating Chrysler Europe, and this also meant the Matra company was renamed Matra-Simca. Matra entered only one 660 for its F1 drivers Chris Amon and Jean-Pierre Beltoise. Beltoise had recently recovered his racing license after investigation in an accident at January's Buenos Aires 1000km that had killed Ferrari driver Ignazio Giunti. After a poor race the previous year, the engine was strengthened and now put out 420 bhp.

While Guy Ligier's GT car was on hold pending homologation, he entered a one-off special – the JS3. Fitted with the Ford-Cosworth DFV F1 engine (that only arrived at the start of race-week, making its Le Mans debut) that was limited to 8800 rpm, allowing around 400 hp. The car had finished second in the Test Weekend race, and for this race was driven by former Matra team manager Claude LeGuezec and Patrick Depailler. Against the French prototypes were a collection of privateer Porsche 908s, including French importer Auguste Veuillet's Sonauto car that had won the three-hour race at the Test Weekend. The 3-litre flat-8 was beginning to show its age and only put out 350 bhp, well below the French competition.

The under-2 litre classes in both Group 5 Sports Cars and Group 6 Prototype-Sports Cars were poorly supported, with no entries in the Sports category. Team Huron could not supply their new cars, so Guy Edwards took one of their entry spots with his Lola T212. With no Chevrons present, its only competition was an older Porsche 907 from the André Wicky team.

In the GT category, the Grand Touring trophy was split into over- and under-2.0 litre classes. In the Over-2 litre class, the two French Corvettes were set to take on the veritable army of privateer Porsche 911s. Once again, rally-specialist Henri Greder and Claude Aubriet's Ecurie Léopard bought their Chevrolet Corvettes as the biggest cars in the entry list. Greder also made waves by nominating his French female rally-driver teammate, Marie-Claude Beaumont, as his co-driver. Female racers had been banned after the death of Annie Bousquet in the 1956 12 Hours of Reims. The American Troy Promotions team had also intended to bring its two Yenko-prepared cars over after strong showings in the American races but were later withdrawn.

Due to insufficient production, Ferrari's current GT car, the 365 GTB/4 "Daytona" had to run in the Group 5 Sports category. Effectively a GT road-car, its 4.4-litre V12 (developing 350 bhp) put it head-to-head against the Porsche 917s and Ferrari 512s. NART entered a single car for Bob Grossman and Luigi Chinetti Jr., son of team owner Luigi Chinetti.

Porsche had now made available a new 2.4-litre engine, alongside the current 2.25 and 2.2-litre versions. It developed 245 bhp that now got the car up to about 255 kp/h (160 mph) on the Mulsanne Straight. Eight of these uprated Porsches were present, including ones for race-winner turned team manager Masten Gregory and the German Kremer Racing team. Kremer himself rejoined Nic Koob in another 2.4, along with Günther Huber in what was the first example of a triple-driver combination. In a reduced under-2 litre class, the Écurie Léopard tried taking on the Porsches with a 1.6-litre Alpine A110.

So Porsche established a single-make record with 33 starters from the field of 49 – a trend that would carry on through the 70s and 80s.

== Practice ==
The test weekend in April had shown the chassis development on the 917 had made them even faster. Jackie Oliver becoming the first person to record a 250 kp/h lap with an incredible time of 3:13.6 equating to 250.5 kp/h (155.6 mph). In June, Rodríguez followed up that form with a 3:13.9 in the JWA Porsche to put a 917 on pole. This was underlined by Vic Elford coming in second, going five seconds faster using the same car as he had the previous year.

Third was the second Wyer car, nearly four seconds behind his teammate. Jo Siffert had had a big moment during practice when he approached Maison Blanche at near 290 kp/h (180 mph). Bill Tuckett in the Paul Watson Porsche did not see him approaching and took his standard line. Swerving to avoid the 911, Siffert got the car into a series of spins but amazingly only lightly tapped the barriers situated right next to the track. He got back to the pits, shaken and livid, and stormed off to the stewards' office to protest.

After a problematic practice session, Penske's Mark Donohue was the fastest of the Ferraris, in fourth just ahead of the second Martini Porsche and Vaccarella in the Spanish Ferrari. The "Pink Pig" Martini 917/20 special was a strong 7th with a 3:21.1. After blowing their engine up on Thursday, the Filipinetti 512F team was able to borrow one from the Penske crew and with it they qualified 8th. Likewise, the Piper Ferrari had problems in practice. The clutch had broken on Wednesday and on Thursday the car kept jumping out of gear. At one point Chris Craft was approaching Maison Blanche at 280 km/h when it skipped into neutral. Despite that he was able to get 9th on the grid. Fastest of the 3-liter Prototypes was the Matra in 16th (3:31.9), well ahead of the Ligier in 17th (3:39.8), while the Léopard Corvette was the fastest GT in 26th (4:09.5).

Another major incident in practice was when André Wicky's 908 lost its rear suspension doing 290 kp/h (180 mph) along the Mulsanne and dragged its tail for over half a kilometre. Wicky was not injured, but the car came to rest over a blind brow and a 917 came flying along the straight to find a marshal on the track sweeping away debris, emphasising the issue of spotting yellow flags at 200 mph!

Regulations dictated that all cars had to be within 140% of the time of the fastest qualifier. This put pressure on the smaller GTs, especially with the big 917s in record-breaking mood. Non-qualifiers included three of the Porsche 911s and the little Alpine. Even that caused a great differential in speeds that many drivers thought dangerous. Once he had recovered after his wild ride during practice, Jo Siffert commented

”I have never seen anything so dangerous as this profusion of slow cars. Le Mans may be the world’s greatest race, but despite its glorious title they must realise that things aren’t right with it. In a lifetime you only have a moment like that, and get away with it, once".

== Race ==
=== Start ===
Despite stormy weather through the week, the practice sessions had been dry and race-day was sunny. Honorary starter this year was Hollywood actor Steve McQueen with the opening of his film "Le Mans" that had been shot with footage from the 1970 race. Left in the pits was the Piper Ferrari and the NART Ferrari spyder with fuel system problems. The Piper car fired up and joined the back of the field, but was delayed again at 5pm when the fuel pump packed up again dropping it well down the field. It was worse for the NART car though, which came straight in at the end of the formation lap and did not get out until a half-hour had passed. It then only managed 7 laps until retired at 7.40pm with clutch failure.

For the first time, and ever since, races begin with rolling starts. At the end of the first lap Rodriguez led from Larrousse, Siffert and the Ferraris of Vaccarella and Donohue. Rodriguez was lapping backmarkers by just the second lap. At the one-hour mark the two Wyer cars of Rodriguez and Siffert were lapping together, having done 17 laps. Larrousse was ten seconds back with ahead of the Ferraris of Donohue, Vaccarella and Parkes. Next were the Porsches of Attwood, Marko and Kauhsen and they were only cars still on the lead lap. Poirot's 910 hit the sandbank at Arnage and although he limped back to the pits on 3 wheels the car was out of the race.

After three hours Rodriguez (52 laps) led from Elford, Donohue in the Penske Ferrari, then Siffert and Marko in the second team Porsches all on the same lap (both having been delayed by loose engine parts). Vaccarella's Spanish Ferrari was sixth ahead of the third team Porsches of Müller and Kauhsen. Donohue soon moved up into second only to have the car hit with terminal engine trouble around 8.15pm. The Lola led the Prototypes (42 laps) and the Léopard Corvette, in 22nd, (41 laps) let the GTs.

Soon after, the cooling fan blew off Elford's Porsche overheating the engine. This left the JWA Porsches running 1-2-3 after 6 hours. The Montjuich Ferrari was fourth ahead of the Martini 917/20 "Pink Pig", the Matra and Marko's recovering Porsche. The Belgian and Piper Ferraris were next and the Ligier rounded out the top-10. The Léopard Corvette (17th) was in a tussle with the Ferrari Daytona (18th) for nominal GT honours. Posey's NART Ferrari was having issues – it had run out of petrol twice, flattened its battery and now was running low oil pressure.

=== Night ===
During the night all three Wyer cars were badly delayed. Just before 10pm, the Siffert/Bell car lost over an hour getting its rear end replaced, dropping it to 13th. At 3am, Oliver bought his JWA car with the same issue and while it was spending 30 minutes getting repaired (dropping it to 4th) the second-placed Attwood/Müller car came in without fifth, needing a half-hour gearbox change.

During this the Pink Pig special had moved up to third when its cooling fan also started coming loose. They had made it back to 3rd after the delay when Joest found he had no brakes approaching Arnage, went up the escape road and crashed out into retirement in the early hours of the morning. The Filipinetti Ferrari had been running 5th early on, then got delayed fixing its fuel pump. Rushing to catch up, Parkes crashed at Maison Blanche at 1 am. Despite extensive damage, it was repaired but Pescarolo had to park it at 3am with no oil pressure.

This put the Montjuich Ferrari into the lead for an hour until it in turn broke its gearbox right on halftime. The Marko/van Lennep Martini Porsche took first, with a five-lap lead now over the Matra of Beltoise/Amon, delighting the partisan crowd. Eighth-placed Guy Chasseuil crashed the French Sonauto Porsche 908 at Maison Blanche. Although the car caught fire, the driver escaped uninjured. Coming up to 5am, Rodriguez was racing toward Indianapolis corner when he was sprayed with hot oil. He got back to the pits but the engine was ruined.

Given the Porsche 911's reputation for reliability it was surprising that by 1am, after 9 hours of racing, already nine of the eighteen entries were out of the race.

=== Morning ===
At 6.20am the Matra went into the pits with a misfire. Changing the sparkplugs, then the fuel meter, let the Attwood/Müller Porsche back into second place. With all the other cars' delays the Piper Ferrari had steadily moved up the order. They had just got to third around 9am when it lost another clutch. At 9:40am, Amon coasted to a stop at the end of the Mulsanne straight. The faulty fuel-meter had finally packed up and run him out of fuel. Soon after the Siffert/Bell Porsche was retired from sixth after it had been delayed further with a cracked crankcase. This had moved the NART Ferrari of Posey/Adamowicz up to third and the Ligier prototype into fifth. But then the Ligier's gearbox seized. JW Automotive gave them Hewland parts to repair it but three hours were lost in the process.

=== Finish and post-race ===
The order stayed pretty static through the afternoon and the race came to a subdued, incident-free end. Marko and van Lennep won by three laps from Attwood and Müller who had eased off their charge back up the field. The two Porsches were the first cars to cover over 5000 km in the race, easily beating that milestone. Putting it in context, it was equivalent to crossing the Atlantic, from Le Mans to Maine in 24 hours. It was a distance record that stood for a remarkable 39 years until beaten by Audi in 2010. What was significant this year was that virtually no car had a trouble-free run, with a number of engine, gearbox and suspension rebuilds required keeping all the pitcrews very busy.

Only two makes were among the classified finishers. Third place, a very distant 29 laps (386 km) further back, was the NART Ferrari. The David Piper Ferrari of Weir/Craft had struggled on, but was never under threat despite finishing fourth with only second and fifth gears left. Fifth was the NART Ferrari Daytona after a reliable run, which also won the Index of Thermal Efficiency.

Half of the twelve classified finishers were Porsche 911s. All of them had been delayed by various mechanical issues. Winner of the GT category was the 2.4-litre ASA Cachia car of Couroul/Anselme (battling an oil-leak) taking sixth in the last hour and finishing barely 40 metres ahead of the André Wicky Porsche 907 of Walter Brun/Peter Mattli. With all the 3-litre cars retiring the Wicky Porsche 907 was the sole Prototype finisher. Tenth was the Kremer-prepared Porsche of Nicolas Koob. They had been leading the category after the halfway mark until delayed for an hour in the morning to replace the gearbox. Last classified finisher was that of Vestey/Bond, managed by Adrian Hamilton and Stuart Rolt, sons of the 1953 race winners.

The JWA team drivers had a tragic end to 1971. Less than a month later, after winning the next round at Österreichring, Pedro Rodriguez was killed driving a Ferrari 512 at Germany's Norisring in a non-championship sports car race. Then in October Jo Siffert died at the World Championship Victory Race at Brands Hatch when his BRM P160 crashed, rolled and caught fire with him trapped underneath.

This race marked an end of an era. It was the last time the Index of Performance prize was awarded. It was also the last run on a circuit layout that had been essentially unchanged for 39 years, with the new Porsche curves permanent race track section opened in the next year, bypassing the dangerous and fast public roads at Maison Blanche.

The FIA regulations also changed for the 1972 World Sportscar Championship, such that the loophole for 5 liter maximum engine capacity of Group 4/Group 5 Sports Cars was finally closed, limiting the 917, 512S, T70, GT40 to Group 7 Can-Am, Interserie, or "classic" events. The former separate Group 6 for prototypes was discontinued, renamed or merged into Group 5 Sports Cars. While the maximum engine capacity of 3 litres remained, the minimum weight was raised to well over 600kg, thus the light weight underpowered aircooled 2-valve flat-8 Porsche 908/02 and Porsche 908/03 became largely obsolete, even at the twisty tracks like Targa Florio and Nürburgring, for which Porsche had made the /03 as specials, replacing the 917K. The factory, having already given the older 908 variants to customers, also sold the 908/03 to privateers who had to add ballast. Some 908 chassis had a comeback, though, as a turbo factor of 1.4 allowed turbocharged engines with 2.1 liter capacity. In 1974 World Sportscar Championship, Porsche entered a 911 Carrera RSR 2.1 Turbo among the prototypes. Starting from 1976, with a new Group 6, both Renault-Alpine and Porsche 936 would dominate with 6-cylinder 2.1 turbo engines over the 3.0 normally aspirated V8 or V12, with Rondeau-Ford celebrating a last hurrah Cosworth win in the 1980 24 Hours of Le Mans.

At the 2018 race, marking Porsche's 70th anniversary the European Porsche GT team revived the "Pink Pig" colour-scheme for one of its entries.

== Official results ==
=== Finishers ===
Results taken from Quentin Spurring's book, officially licensed by the ACO Class Winners are in Bold text.

Pos	Class	No.	Team	Drivers	Chassis	Engine	Tyre	Laps
1	**S** **5.0**	**22**	**(Germany) Martini International**; **Racing Team**	**(Netherlands) Gijs van Lennep** **(Austria) Helmut Marko**	Porsche 917K	Porsche 4.9L F12	**F**	397
2	S 5.0	19	(United Kingdom) JW Automotive Engineering	(United Kingdom) Richard Attwood (Switzerland) Herbert Müller	Porsche 917K	Porsche 4.9L F12	**F**	395
3	S 5.0	12	(United States) North American Racing Team	(United States) Sam Posey (United States) Tony Adamowicz	Ferrari 512M	Ferrari 5.0L V12	**G**	366
4	S 5.0	16	(United Kingdom) David Piper Autorace (United States) D. Weir (private entrant)	(United States) David Weir (United Kingdom) Chris Craft	Ferrari 512M	Ferrari 5.0L V12	**G**	355
5	S 5.0	58 (reserve)	(United States) North American Racing Team	(United States) Bob Grossman (United States) Luigi Chinetti Jr.	Ferrari 365 GTB/4	Ferrari 4.4L V12	**G**	314
6	**GT** **+2.0**	**63** (reserve)	**(France) ASA Cachia Bundi**	**(France) Raymond Touroul** **(France) André Anselme**	Porsche 911S	Porsche 2.4L F6	**MI**	306
7	**P** **2.0**	**49**	**(Switzerland) Wicky Racing Team**	**(Switzerland) Walter Brun** **(Switzerland) Peter Mattli**	Porsche 907	Porsche 1958cc F6	**F**	306
8	GT +2.0	38	(France) R. Mazzia (private entrant)	(France) René Mazzia (Germany) Jürgen Barth	Porsche 911E	Porsche 2.4L F6	**MI**	303
9	GT +2.0	42	(France) J. Mésange (private entrant)	(France) Jean Mésange (France) "Gédéhem" (Gérard Darton-Merlin)	Porsche 911S	Porsche 2.2L F6	**D**	298
10	GT +2.0	26	(Luxembourg) N. Koob (private entrant) (Germany) Porsche-Kremer Racing	(Luxembourg) Nicolas Koob (Germany) Erwin Kremer (Austria) Günther Huber	Porsche 911S	Porsche 2.4L F6	**D**	292
11	GT +2.0	39	(France) A.G.A.C.I.	(France) Guy Verrier (France) Gérard Foucault	Porsche 911S	Porsche 2.2L F6	**D**	290
12	GT +2.0	44	(United Kingdom) Paul Watson Race Organisation	(United Kingdom) Paul Vestey (United Kingdom) Richard Bond	Porsche 911S	Porsche 2.2L F6	**D**	286
N/C *	P 3.0	24	(France) Automobiles Ligier	(France) Guy Ligier (France) Patrick Depailler	Ligier JS3	Ford-Cosworth DFV 3.0L V8	**G** or **MI**	270
N/C *	GT +2.0	36	(France) Écurie Jean Sage (private entrant)	(Sweden) Björn Waldegård (Switzerland) Bernard Chenevière	Porsche 911S	Porsche 2.4L F6	**D**	263

- 'Note *: Not Classified because insufficient distance covered.

=== Did Not Finish ===
Pos	Class	No	Team	Drivers	Chassis	Engine	Tyre	Laps	Reason
DNF	P 3.0	32	(France) Equipe Matra	(New Zealand) Chris Amon (France) Jean-Pierre Beltoise	Matra-Simca MS660	Matra 3.0L V12	G	263	Fuel system (18hr)
DNF	S 5.0	17	(United Kingdom) JW Automotive Engineering	(Switzerland) Jo Siffert (United Kingdom) Derek Bell	Porsche 917LH	Porsche 4.9L F12	F	240	Transmission (18hr)
DNF	P 3.0	29	(Switzerland) Wicky Racing Team	(Switzerland) André Wicky (Morocco) Max Cohen-Olivar	Porsche 908/2	Porsche 3.0L F8	F	236	Transmission (20hr)
DNF	S 5.0	9	(Belgium) Ecurie Francorchamps	(Belgium) Baron Hughes de Fierlandt (United Kingdom) Alain de Cadenet	Ferrari 512M	Ferrari 5.0L V12	F	235	Transmission (18hr)
DNF	S 5.0	57 (reserve)	(Switzerland) Zitro Racing Team (private entrant)	(Switzerland) Dominique Martin (Switzerland) Gérard Pillon	Porsche 917K	Porsche 4.5L F12	G	228	Transmission (22hr)
DNF	S 5.0	6	(Switzerland) Scuderia Filipinetti (Italy) Scuderia Picchio Rosso	(Italy) Corrado Manfredini (Italy) Giancarlo Gagliardi	Ferrari 512M	Ferrari 5.0L V12	G	197	Transmission (17hr)
DNF	GT +2.0	35	(Switzerland) P. Greub (private entrant)	(Switzerland) Pierre Greub (France) Sylvain Garant	Porsche 911S	Porsche 2.4L F6	D	196	Engine (21hr)
DNF	P 3.0	30	(France) L. Cosson (private entrant)	(France) Louis Cosson (Germany) Helmut Leuze	Porsche 908/2	Porsche 3.0L F8	D	192	Oil pipe (16hr)
DNF	GT +2.0	1	(France) Écurie Léopard	(France) Jean-Claude Aubriet (France) Jean-Pierre Rouget	Chevrolet Corvette C3	Chevrolet 7.0L V8	G	189	Transmission (16hr)
DNF	S 5.0	18	(United Kingdom) JW Automotive Engineering	(Mexico) Pedro Rodriguez (United Kingdom) Jackie Oliver	Porsche 917LH	Porsche 4.9L F12	F	187	Oil pipe (14hr)
DNF	S 5.0	15	(Spain) Escuderia Montjuïch	(Spain) José Juncadella (Italy) Nino Vaccarella	Ferrari 512M	Ferrari 5.0L V12	F	186	Transmission (14hr)
DNF	GT; 2.0	47	(Switzerland) Wicky Racing Team	(Switzerland) Jean-Jacques Cochet (Switzerland) Jean Selz	Porsche 911S	Porsche 1991cc F6	D	183	Transmission (17hr)
DNF	S 5.0	23	(Germany) Martini International; Racing Team	(Germany) Reinhold Joest (Germany) Willi Kauhsen	Porsche 917/20	Porsche 4.9L F12	F	180	Accident (12hr)
DNF	P 3.0	28	(France) Établissement Sonauto; Auguste Veuillet	(France) Claude Ballot-Léna (France) Guy Chasseuil	Porsche 908/2	Porsche 3.0L F8	D	169	Accident (14hr)
DNF	GT; 2.0	69 (reserve)	(Germany) Autohaus Max Moritz GmbH	(Germany) Gerd Quist (Germany) Dietrich Krumm	Porsche 914/6 GT	Porsche 1991cc F6	G	160	Transmission (15hr)
DNF	GT +2.0	2	(France) Greder Racing	(France) Henri Greder (France) Marie-Claude Beaumont	Chevrolet Corvette C3	Chevrolet 7.0L V8	G	141	Engine (14hr)
DNF	S 5.0	7	(Switzerland) Scuderia Filipinetti	(United Kingdom) Mike Parkes (France) Henri Pescarolo	Ferrari 512F	Ferrari 5.0L V12	G	120	Engine (13hr)
DNF	GT +2.0	65 (reserve)	(France) J. Dechaumel (private entrant)	(France) Jacques Dechaumel (France) Jean-Claude Parot	Porsche 911S	Porsche 2.2L F6	D	105	Rear suspension (13hr)
DNF	GT +2.0	37	(France) P. Mauroy (private entrant)	(France) Pierre Mauroy (France) Jean-Claude Lagniez	Porsche 911S	Porsche 2.4L F6	D	78	Transmission (8hr)
DNF	S 5.0	21	(Germany) Martini International; Racing Team	(United Kingdom) Vic Elford (France) Gérard Larrousse	Porsche 917LH	Porsche 4.9L F12	F	74	Engine (9hr)
DNF	GT +2.0	41	(Belgium) J.-P. Gaban (private entrant)	(Belgium) Jean-Pierre Gaban (Belgium) Willy Braillard	Porsche 911S	Porsche 2.2L F6	D	68	Engine (8hr)
DNF	S 5.0	10	(Germany) Gelo Racing Team	(Germany) Georg Loos (Germany) Franz Pesch	Ferrari 512M	Ferrari 5.0L V12	F	63	Engine (6hr)
DNF	GT; 2.0	46	(Switzerland) Ecurie Porsche Club Romand	(Switzerland) Paul Keller (France) Jean Sage	Porsche 914/6 GT	Porsche 1991cc F6	F	61	Engine (9hr)
DNF	GT +2.0	33	(Switzerland) Rey Racing	(Switzerland) Jacques Rey (France) Jean-Pierre Cassegrain	Porsche 911S	Porsche 2.5L F6	D	58	Engine (9hr)
DNF	S 5.0	11	(United States) North American Racing Team (United States) Penske Racing	(United States) Mark Donohue (United Kingdom) David Hobbs	Ferrari 512M	Ferrari 5.0L V12	G	58	Engine (6hr)
DNF	P 2.0	50	(United Kingdom) Camel Filters Team Huron; G. Edwards	(United Kingdom) Guy Edwards (United Kingdom) Roger Enever	Lola T212	Ford Cosworth FVC 1798cc S4	D	55	Engine (8hr)
DNF	GT +2.0	34	(United States) Richie Ginther Racing (private entrant)	(United States) Alan Johnson (United States) Elliot Forbes-Robinson	Porsche 911S	Porsche 2.4L F6	G	50	Engine (8hr)
DNF	GT +2.0	40	(France) J. Egreteaud (private entrant)	(France) Jean Egreteaud (Belgium) Jean-Marie Jacquemin	Porsche 911S	Porsche 2.2L F6	D	41	Engine (8hr)
DNF	GT +2.0	66 (reserve)	(Switzerland) Rey Racing	(France) Jean-Claude Guérie (France) Claude Mathurin	Porsche 911S	Porsche 2.2L F6	MI	34	Electrics (5hr)
DNF	GT +2.0	48	(France) J.-P. Hanrioud (private entrant)	(France) Jean-Pierre Hanrioud (Italy) Mario Ilotte	Porsche 911S	Porsche 2.2L F6	P	27	Engine (5hr)
DNF	GT +2.0	43	(France) F. Migault (private entrant)	(France) Jean-Pierre Bodin (France) Gilbert Courthiade	Porsche 911S	Porsche 2.2L F6	D	22	Engine (4hr)
DNF	P 3.0	60 (reserve)	(Switzerland) C. Haldi (private entrant)	(Switzerland) Claude Haldi (Germany) Hans-Dieter Weigel	Porsche 908/2	Porsche 3.0L F8	F	18	Transmission (6hr)
DNF	S 5.0	5	(Belgium) Racing Team VDS	(Belgium) Teddy Pilette (Belgium) Gustave Gosselin	Lola T70 Mk. IIIB	Chevrolet 5.0L V8	G	14	Engine (3hr)
DNF	P 3.0	27	(France) C. Poirot (private entrant)	(France) Christian Poirot (France) Jean-Claude Andruet	Porsche 910	Porsche 3.0L F8	D	12	Accident (3hr)
DNF	S 5.0	14	(United States) North American Racing Team	(United States) Masten Gregory (Canada) George Eaton	Ferrari 512S Spyder	Ferrari 5.0L V12	G	7	Fuel system (5hr)

=== Did Not Start ===
Pos	Class	No	Team	Drivers	Chassis	Engine	Tyre	Reason
DNQ	GT +2.0	45	(France) C. Laurent (private entrant)	(France) Claude Laurent (France) Jacques Marché	Porsche 911S	Porsche 2.2L F6	**D**	Did not qualify
DNQ	GT; 2.0	52	(France) Écurie Léopard	(France) Jacques Bourdon (France) Maurice Nussbaumer	Alpine A110	Renault 1596cc S4	**MI**	Did not qualify
DNQ	GT +2.0	64 (reserve)	(Germany) Porsche-Kremer Racing	(France) Claude Buchet (France) Jean-Paul Agére	Porsche 911S	Porsche 2.4L F6	**D**	Did not qualify
DNQ	GT +2.0	68 (reserve)	(United Kingdom) Paul Watson Race Organisation	(United Kingdom) John Chatham (United Kingdom) Mike Coombe	Porsche 911S	Porsche 2.2L F6	**D**	Practice accident
DNA	GT +2.0	3	(United States) Troy Promotions Inc	(United States) Don Yenko (United States) Tony DeLorenzo	Chevrolet Corvette C3	Chevrolet 7.0L V8		Did not arrive
DNA	GT +2.0	4	(United States) Troy Promotions Inc	(United States) Dick Thompson (United States) John Mahler	Chevrolet Corvette C3	Chevrolet 7.0L V8		Did not arrive
DNA	S 5.0	5	(Switzerland) Scuderia Filipinetti	(France) Jean-Pierre Jabouille (Sweden) Ronnie Peterson	Ferrari 512M	Ferrari 5.0L V12		Did not arrive
DNA	S 5.0	19	(Spain) Escuderia Nacional C.S. (private entrant)	(Spain) Alex Soler-Roig	Porsche 917K	Porsche 4.5L F12		Did not arrive
DNA	P 2.0	54	(France) F. Migault (private entrant)	(France) François Migault	Huron 4A	Ford Cosworth FVC 1798cc S4		Did not arrive
DNA	P 2.0	55	(Switzerland) Scuderia Filipinetti		Lola T212	Ford Cosworth FVC 1798cc S4		Did not arrive
DNA	S 5.0	61 (reserve)	(United States) North American Racing Team	(Belgium) Jacky Ickx (Switzerland) Clay Regazzoni	Ferrari 512M	Ferrari 5.0L V12	**G**	Reserve

=== Class Winners ===
Class	Prototype Winners		Class	Sports Winners		Class	GT Winners	
Prototype 3000	no finishers		Sports 5000	#22 Porsche 917K	van Lennep / Marko *	Grand Touring >2000	#63 Porsche 911 S	Touroul / Anselme *
Prototype 2000	#49 Porsche 907	Brun / Mattli	Sports 2000	no entrants		Grand Touring 2000	no finishers	

- Note: setting a new class distance record.

=== Index of Thermal Efficiency ===
Pos	Class	No	Team	Drivers	Chassis	Score
1	S 5.0	58 (reserve)	(United States) North American Racing Team	(United States) Bob Grossman (United States) Luigi Chinetti Jr.	Ferrari 365 GTB/4	1.12
2	S 5.0	22	(Germany) Martini International; Racing Team	(Netherlands) Gijs van Lennep (Austria) Helmut Marko	Porsche 917K	1.08
3	S 5.0	19	(United Kingdom) JW Automotive Engineering	(United Kingdom) Richard Attwood (Switzerland) Herbert Müller	Porsche 917K	1.01
4	S 5.0	12	(United States) North American Racing Team	(United States) Sam Posey (United States) Tony Adamowicz	Ferrari 512M	0.96
5=	GT +2.0	38	(France) R. Mazzia (private entrant)	(France) René Mazzia (Germany) Jürgen Barth	Porsche 911E	0.91
5=	GT +2.0	63 (reserve)	(France) ASA Cachia Bundi	(France) Raymond Touroul (France) André Anselme	Porsche 911S	0.91
7	GT +2.0	42	(France) J. Mésange (private entrant)	(France) Jean Mésange (France) "Gédéhem"	Porsche 911S	0.89
8	P 2.0	49	(Switzerland) Wicky Racing Team	(Switzerland) Walter Brun (Switzerland) Peter Mattli	Porsche 907	0.85
9	GT +2.0	39	(France) A.G.A.C.I.	(France) Guy Verrier (France) Gérard Foucault	Porsche 911S	0.83

=== Index of Performance ===
Taken from Moity's book.

Pos	Class	No	Team	Drivers	Chassis	Score
1	S 5.0	22	(Germany) Martini International; Racing Team	(Netherlands) Gijs van Lennep (Austria) Dr. Helmut Marko	Porsche 917K	1.302
2	S 5.0	19	(United Kingdom) JW Automotive Engineering	(United Kingdom) Richard Attwood (Switzerland) Herbert Müller	Porsche 917K	1.296
3	S 5.0	12	(United States) North American Racing Team	(United States) Sam Posey (United States) Tony Adamowicz	Ferrari 512M	1.200
4	GT +2.0	63 (reserve)	(France) ASA Cachia Bundi	(France) Raymond Touroul (France) André Anselme	Porsche 911S	1.192
5	GT +2.0	38	(France) R. Mazzia (private entrant)	(France) René Mazzia (Germany) Jürgen Barth	Porsche 911E	1.182
6	GT +2.0	42	(France) J. Mésange (private entrant)	(France) Jean Mésange (France) "Gédéhem"	Porsche 911S	1.173
7	S 5.0	16	(United Kingdom) David Piper Autorace (United States) D. Weir (private entrant)	(United States) David Weir (United Kingdom) Chris Craft	Ferrari 512M	1.162
8	GT +2.0	39	(France) A.G.A.C.I.	(France) Guy Verrier (France) Gérard Foucault	Porsche 911S	1.142
9	GT +2.0	26	(Luxembourg) N. Koob (private entrant) (Germany) Porsche-Kremer Racing	(Luxembourg) Nicolas Koob (Germany) Erwin Kremer (Austria) Günther Huber	Porsche 911S	1.138
10	GT +2.0	44	(United Kingdom) Paul Watson Race Organisation	(United Kingdom) Paul Vestey (United Kingdom) Richard Bond	Porsche 911S	1.127

- Note: Only the top ten positions are included in this set of standings. A score of 1.00 means meeting the minimum distance for the car, and a higher score is exceeding the nominal target distance.

=== Statistics ===
- Fastest Lap in test – J. Oliver, Porsche 917L – 3:13.6secs; 250.5 km/h (155.7 mph)
- Pole position – P. Rodríguez, #18 Porsche 917L – 3:13.9 s

Taken from Quentin Spurring's book, officially licensed by the ACO

- Fastest Lap in practice – J. Oliver, #18 Porsche 917L – 3:13.9secs; 250.07 km/h (155.39 mph)
- Fastest Lap – J. Oliver, #18 Porsche 917L – 3:18.4secs; 244.39 km/h (151.86 mph)
- Winning Distance – 5,335.31 km (3,315.21 mi)
- Winner's Average Speed – 222.29 km/h (138.12 mph)
- Attendance – ?

=== International Championship for Makes Standings ===
As calculated after Le Mans, Round 9 of 11

Pos	Manufacturer	Points
1	(West Germany) Porsche	67 (70)*
2	(Italy) Alfa Romeo	39
3	(Italy) Ferrari	20
4	(United Kingdom) Lola	5
5	(United States) Chevrolet	3

- Note: Only the best 8 of 11 results counted to the final Championship points. The full total earned to date is given in brackets

Citations
