= 1971 World Sportscar Championship =

Racing tournament

Seasons
- ← 1970 1972 →

The 1971 International Championship for Makes season was the 19th season of FIA World Sportscar Championship motor racing. It was open to Group 6 Sports Prototypes, Group 5 Sportscars, and Group 4 Special GT Cars, and was contested over an eleven-race series running from 10 January to 24 July 1971. Porsche won the championship, and the German manufacturer also won the International Cup for GT Cars.

== Schedule ==
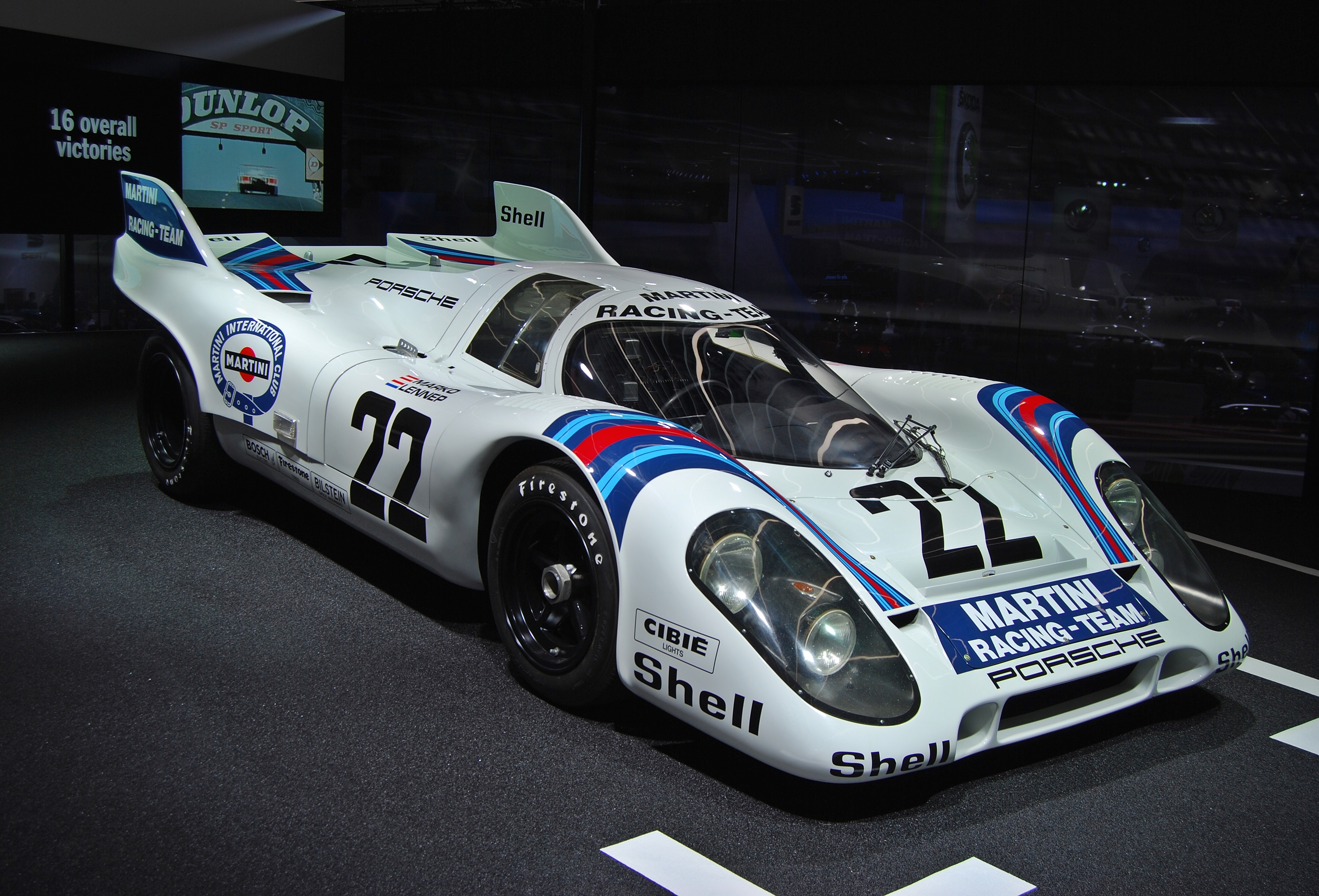
Porsche won the 1971 International Championship for Makes with its 917K (pictured) and 908/3 models

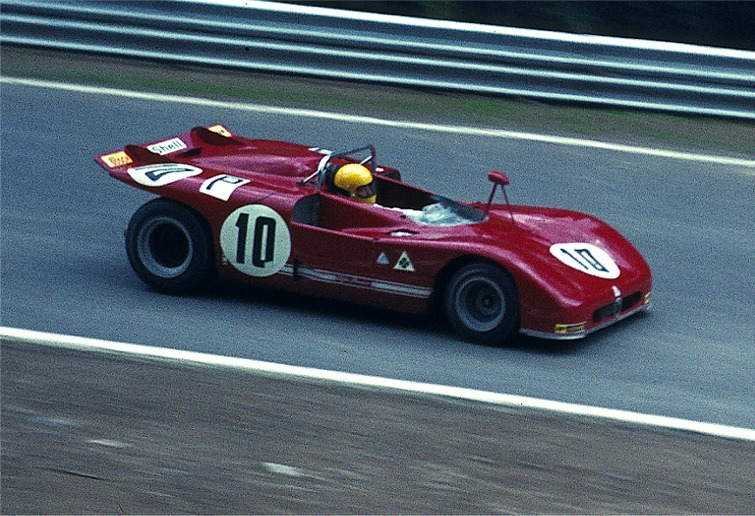
Alfa Romeo placed second with its T33/3 model

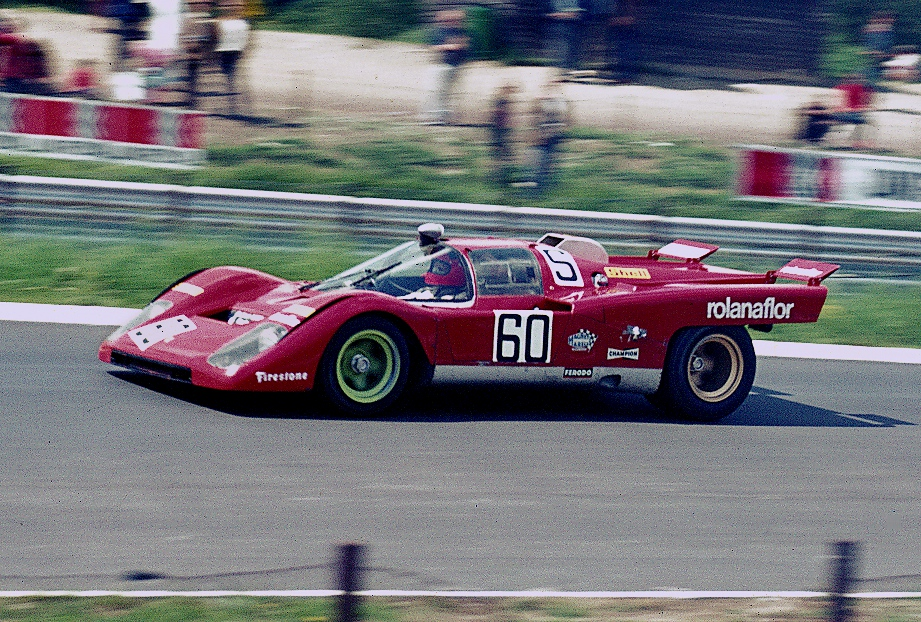
Ferrari placed third with its 512M (pictured), 512S and 312PB models

Rnd	Race	Circuit or Location	Date
1	(Argentina) 1000km of Buenos Aires^{†}	Autódromo Oscar Alfredo Gálvez	10 January
2	(United States) 24 Hours of Daytona Beach	Daytona International Speedway	30 January; 31 January
3	(United States) 12 Hours of Sebring	Sebring International Raceway	20 March
4	(United Kingdom) BOAC 1000km^{†}	Brands Hatch	4 April
5	(Italy) 1000 Km. di Monza (Trofeo Filippo Caracciolo)	Autodromo Nazionale Monza	25 April
6	(Belgium) 1000km Spa	Circuit de Spa-Francorchamps	9 May
7	(Italy) Targa Florio	Circuito Piccolo delle Madonie	16 May
8	(Germany) ADAC 1000km Nürburgring	Nürburgring	30 May
9	(France) 24 Hours of Le Mans	Circuit de la Sarthe	12 June; 13 June
10	(Austria) Austrian 1000km	Österreichring	27 June
11	(United States) Watkins Glen 6 Hours	Watkins Glen International	24 July

† - Sports Prototypes and Sportscars only, GT class did not participate.

== Season results ==
=== Races ===
Rnd	Circuit	Outright winning team	GT winning team	Results
Rnd	Circuit	Outright winning drivers	GT winning drivers	Results
Rnd	Circuit	Outright winning car	GT winning car	Results
1	Buenos Aires	(United Kingdom) #30 John Wyer Automotive	None	Results
1	Buenos Aires	(Switzerland) Jo Siffert (United Kingdom) Derek Bell		Results
1	Buenos Aires	Porsche 917K		Results
2	Daytona	(United Kingdom) #2 John Wyer Automotive	(United States) #11 Owens Corning Fiberglass	Results
2	Daytona	(Mexico) Pedro Rodriguez (United Kingdom) Jackie Oliver	(United States) Tony DeLorenzo (United States) Don Yenko	Results
2	Daytona	Porsche 917K	Chevrolet Corvette	Results
3	Sebring	(Germany) #3 Martini Racing	(United States) #48 John Greenwood Racing	Results
3	Sebring	(United Kingdom) Vic Elford (France) Gérard Larrousse	(United States) John Greenwood (United States) Dick Smothers	Results
3	Sebring	Porsche 917K	Chevrolet Corvette	Results
4	Brands Hatch	(Italy) #54 Autodelta SpA	None	Results
4	Brands Hatch	(Italy) Andrea de Adamich (France) Henri Pescarolo		Results
4	Brands Hatch	Alfa Romeo T33/3		Results
5	Monza	(United Kingdom) #2 John Wyer Automotive	(Germany) #50 Kremer Racing	Results
5	Monza	(Mexico) Pedro Rodriguez (United Kingdom) Jackie Oliver	(Germany) Erwin Kremer (Germany) Günther Huber	Results
5	Monza	Porsche 917K	Porsche 911S	Results
6	Spa-Francorchamps	(United Kingdom) #21 John Wyer Automotive	(Germany) #46 Kremer Racing	Results
6	Spa-Francorchamps	(Mexico) Pedro Rodriguez (United Kingdom) Jackie Oliver	(Germany) Erwin Kremer (Germany) Günther Huber	Results
6	Spa-Francorchamps	Porsche 917K	Porsche 911S	Results
7	Targa Florio	(Italy) #5 Autodelta SpA	(Switzerland) #42 Porsche Club Romand	Results
7	Targa Florio	(Italy) Nino Vaccarella (Netherlands) Toine Hezemans	(Switzerland) Bernard Cheneviére (Switzerland) Paul Keller	Results
7	Targa Florio	Alfa Romeo T33/3	Porsche 911S	Results
8	Nürburgring	(Germany) #3 Martini Racing	(Germany) #82 Kremer Racing	Results
8	Nürburgring	(United Kingdom) Vic Elford (France) Gérard Larrousse	(Germany) Erwin Kremer (Germany) Jürgen Neuhaus	Results
8	Nürburgring	Porsche 908/3	Porsche 911S	Results
9	La Sarthe	(Germany) #22 Martini Racing	(France) #63 ASA Cachia Bundi	Results
9	La Sarthe	(Austria) Helmut Marko (Netherlands) Gijs van Lennep	(France) Raymond Touroul (France) André Anselme	Results
9	La Sarthe	Porsche 917K	Porsche 911S	Results
10	Österreichring	(United Kingdom) #16 John Wyer Automotive	(Germany) #43 Peter Kersten	Results
10	Österreichring	(Mexico) Pedro Rodriguez (United Kingdom) Richard Attwood	(Germany) Peter Kersten (Germany) Clemens Schickentanz	Results
10	Österreichring	Porsche 917K	Porsche 911S	Results
11	Watkins Glen	(Italy) #30 Autodelta SpA	(United States) #49 John Greenwood Racing	Results
11	Watkins Glen	(Italy) Andrea de Adamich (Sweden) Ronnie Peterson	(United States) John Greenwood (United States) Robert R. Johnson	Results
11	Watkins Glen	Alfa Romeo T33/3	Chevrolet Corvette	Results

== Championship results ==
=== International Championship for Makes ===
Championship points were awarded to the top 6 finishers in each race in the order of 9-6-4-3-2-1. Manufacturers were only given points for their highest finishing car and any other cars from that manufacturer were merely skipped in the points standings.

All Sportscars, Sports Prototypes and GT cars were eligible for points towards the International Championship for Makes and the GT class also had their own separate award.

Cars participating in races that were not included in the Sportscar, Sports Prototype or GT classes were skipped when awarding points for the overall championship.

Only the best 8 points finishes counted towards the championship, with any other points earned not included in the total. Discarded points are shown within brackets.

Pos	Manufacturer	Rd 1	Rd 2	Rd 3	Rd 4	Rd 5	Rd 6	Rd 7	Rd 8	Rd 9	Rd 10	Rd 11	Total
1	(Germany) Porsche	9	9	9	(4)	9	9	(3)	9	9	9	(6)	72
2	(Italy) Alfa Romeo	4		6	9	4	4	9	(3)		6	9	51
3	(Italy) Ferrari	2	6	1	6	1				4	3	3	26
4	(United Kingdom) Lola						1	4					5
5	(United States) Chevrolet		3									2	5

=== International Cup for GT Cars ===
The GT class did not participate in Rounds 1 and 4. Only the best 7 finishes were counted towards the International Cup for GT Cars. Discarded points are shown within brackets.

Pos	Manufacturer	Rd 2	Rd 3	Rd 5	Rd 6	Rd 7	Rd 8	Rd 9	Rd 10	Rd 11	Total
1	(Germany) Porsche	(4)	6	9	9	9	9	9	9	(6)	60
2	(United States) Chevrolet	9	9		1					9	28
3	(Germany) Opel					3					3
4	(Italy) Alfa Romeo					1					1

== The cars ==
The following models contributed to the net points scores of their respective manufacturers.

=== International Championship for Makes ===
- Porsche 917K & Porsche 908/3
- Alfa Romeo T33/3
- Ferrari 512M, Ferrari 512S & Ferrari 312PB
- Lola T70 Mk.3B Chevrolet & Lola T212 Ford
- Chevrolet Corvette

=== International Cup for GT Cars ===
- Porsche 911S
- Chevrolet Corvette
- Opel GT
- Alfa Romeo GTA
