= Helmut Marko =

Austrian racing driver and motorsport executive (born 1943)

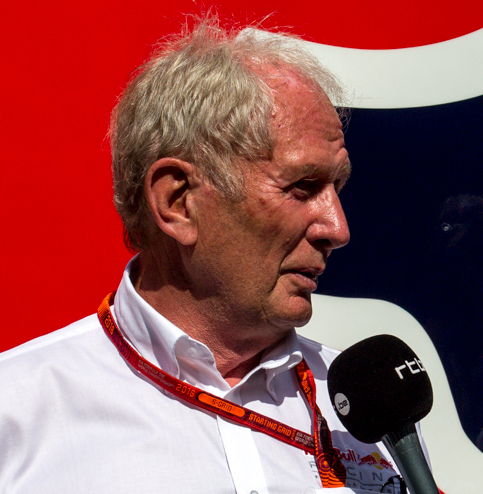
- Marko at the 2016 Austrian Grand Prix
- Born: 27 April 1943 (age 83); Graz, German Reich

Formula One World Championship career
- Nationality: (Austria) Austrian
- Active years: 1971–1972
- Team(s): Bonnier, BRM
- Entries: 10 (9 starts)
- Championships: 0
- Wins: 0
- Podiums: 0
- Career points: 0
- Pole positions: 0
- Fastest laps: 0
- First entry: 1971 German Grand Prix
- Last entry: 1972 French Grand Prix

World Sportscar Championship career
- Years active: 1968–1972
- Teams: Lotus, Porsche, Martini, Alfa Romeo, Ferrari
- Starts: 22
- Wins: 5
- Podiums: 12
- Poles: 3
- Fastest laps: 4

24 Hours of Le Mans career
- Years: 1970–1972
- Teams: Martini, Alfa Romeo
- Best finish: 1st (1971)
- Class wins: 2 (1970, 1971)

Helmut Marko (born 27 April 1943) is an Austrian former racing driver and motorsport executive who competed in Formula One at ten Grands Prix from 1971 to 1972. In endurance racing, Marko won the 24 Hours of Le Mans in 1971 with Martini. He founded RSM Marko in 1984, which later became the Red Bull Junior Team; from 2005 to 2025, he served as an adviser to Red Bull Racing and its related teams in Formula One, winning six World Constructors' Championship titles between 2010 and 2023.

Born and raised in Austria, Marko progressed to sportscar racing by the late-1960s after completing his doctorate in law at the University of Graz. Finding success in the European Touring Car Championship and becoming a class winner at the 1970 24 Hours of Le Mans with Martini, Marko progressed to the premier class the following year and won the race in then-record distance alongside Gijs van Lennep. Less than two months later, Marko debuted in Formula One with Bonnier at the German Grand Prix, driving a privateer McLaren M7C. He joined BRM for the remainder of the 1971 season, and retained his seat in 1972. Marko was seriously injured during the 1972 French Grand Prix, when debris projected by the March of Ronnie Peterson pierced his visor and left him permanently blinded in his left eye, ending his racing career at the age of 29.

Upon retiring from motor racing, Marko moved into team and driver management, founding RSM Marko in 1984, which became the Red Bull Junior Team in 1999. With Red Bull, Marko oversaw the development of two Formula One World Drivers' Champions—Sebastian Vettel and Max Verstappen—and was an adviser to Red Bull Racing from 2005 onwards, winning six World Constructors' Championships with the team; the graduates of his development programme have won a combined eight World Drivers' Championships and 140 Grands Prix. He retired from his management roles at the end of 2025.

== Early life ==
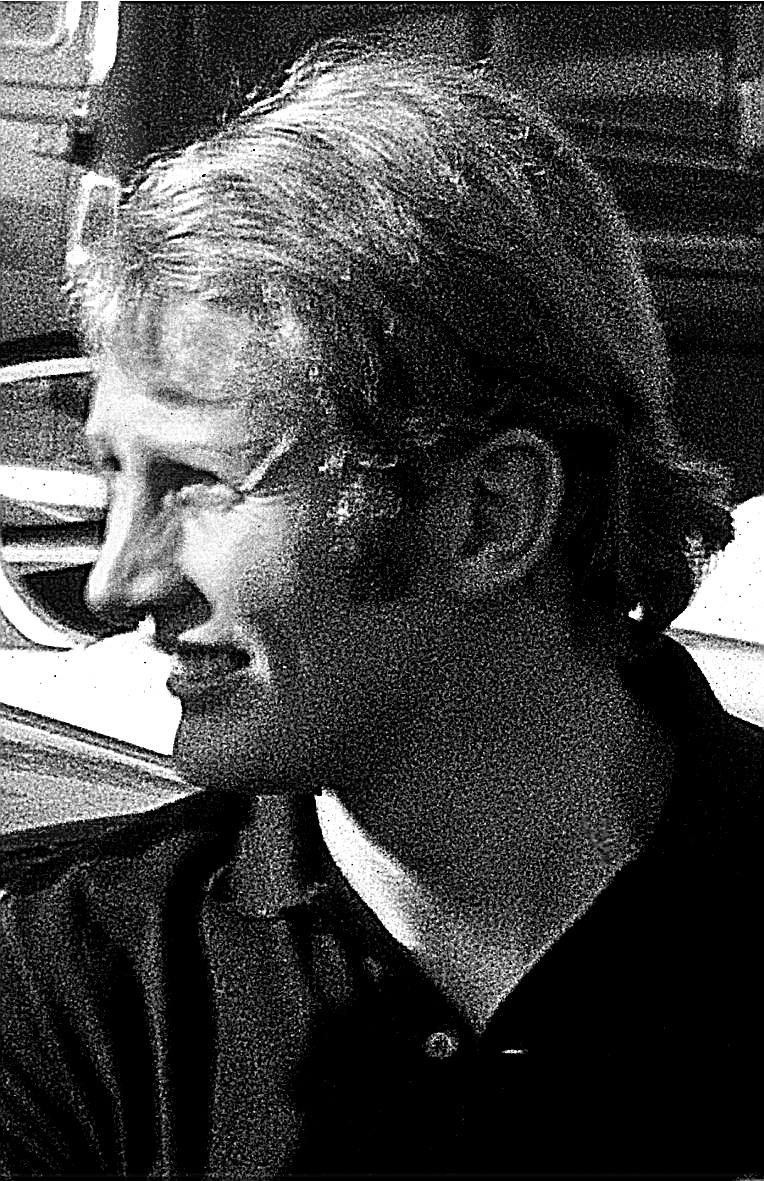
Marko in 1970

Marko was born in Graz on 27 April 1943, during Nazi occupation of Austria in World War II. He attended school with and was a childhood friend of Jochen Rindt, who later posthumously won the Formula One World Drivers' Championship in 1970. Marko graduated from the University of Graz in 1967 with a doctorate in law. He had ambitions to become a lawyer before pursuing a full-time motor racing career.

== Sportscar racing career ==
=== Privateer (1966–1969) ===
Marko debuted in sportscar racing as a privateer in 1966, driving the Triumph Spitfire at Aspern.

=== Martini (1970–1971) ===
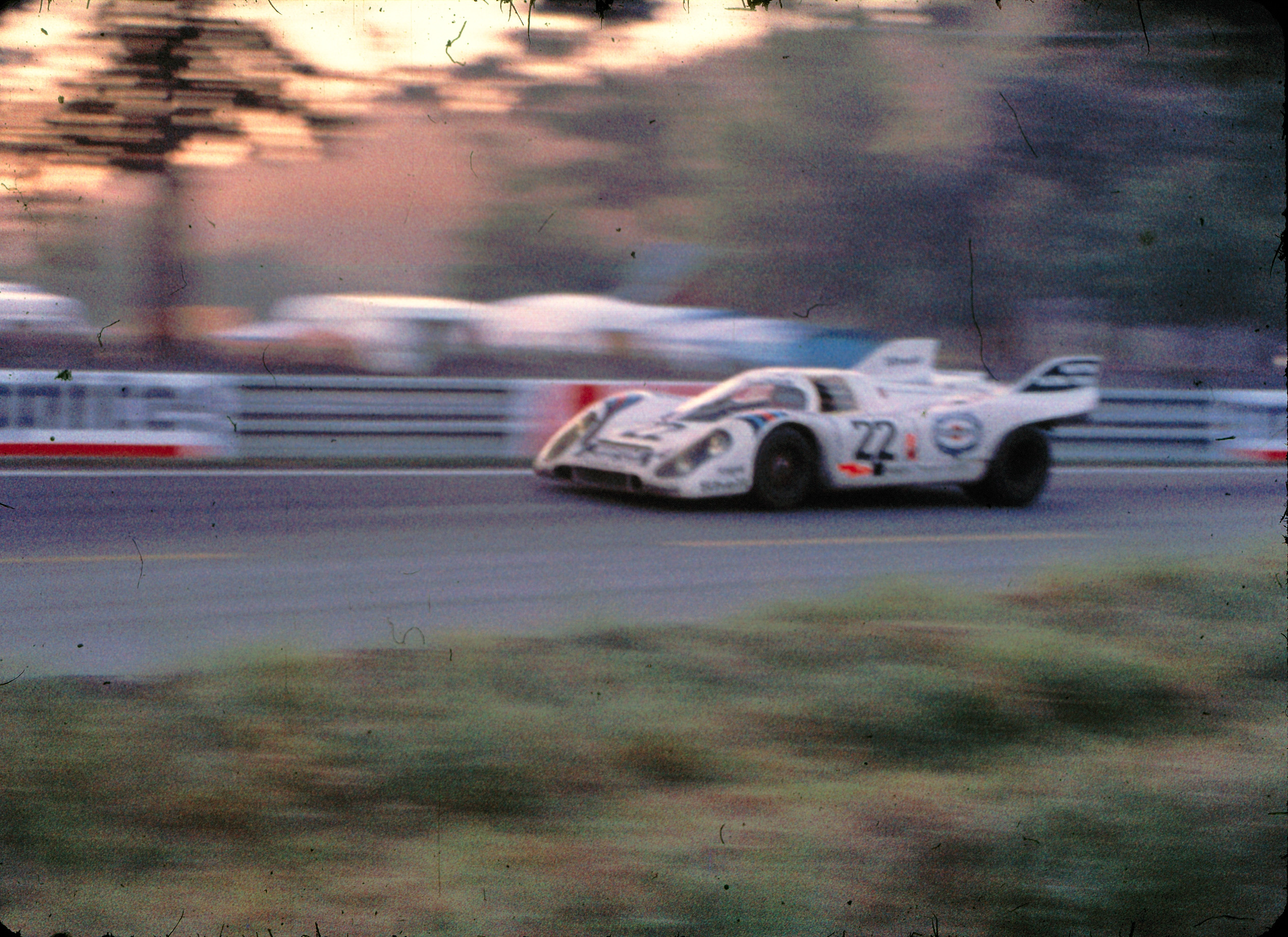
Marko racing at the 1971 24 Hours of Le Mans

Marko had success in endurance racing, winning the 1971 24 Hours of Le Mans, driving a Martini-Porsche 917K with Gijs van Lennep. During that year, they set a distance record which remained unbeaten until 2010 (5,335.313 km, at an average of 222.304 km/h). In 1971 Marko also won the European 2-Litre Sports Car Championship driving for Lola.

=== Alfa Romeo (1972) ===
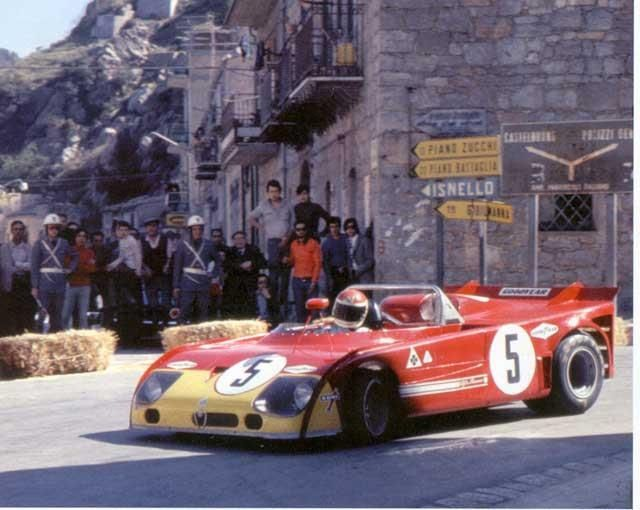
Marko at the 1972 Targa Florio

At the Targa Florio, Marko drove the fastest laps around the 72 km Sicilian mountain circuit in the 1972 race, catching up over two minutes on the leader within two laps to finish second by a mere 17 seconds. His fastest lap in the Alfa Romeo 33 was 33 min 41 sec, at an average of 128.253 km/h.

== Formula One career ==
Marko made his first entry in Formula One with Jo Bonnier's privateer outfit—Ecurie Bonnier—at the German Grand Prix in 1971, driving the McLaren M7C. He did not set a time in qualifying after completing free practice and thus did not start the Grand Prix.

=== BRM (1971–1972) ===
==== 1971: Debut with BRM under Stanley ====
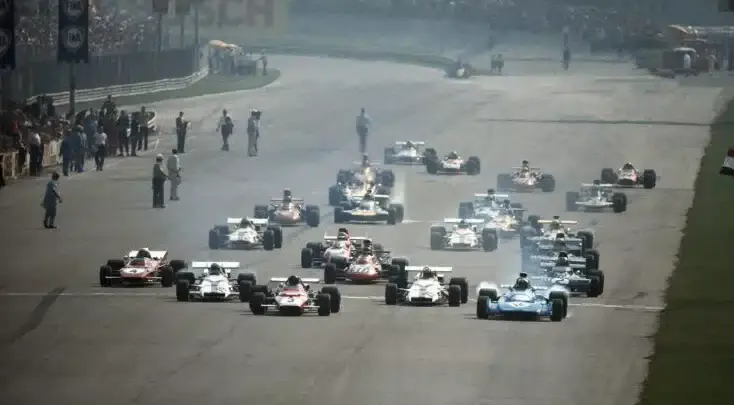
Marko (left, second row) joined BRM for the remainder of 1971, pictured at the Italian Grand Prix.

Marko was invited by Louis Stanley to join BRM for his home Grand Prix in Austria onwards in 1971, partnering Jo Siffert, Howden Ganley, and Peter Gethin in place of the deceased Pedro Rodríguez. His teammates all used the updated P160 chassis while Marko used a spare P153 from the previous season. Qualifying a tenth-of-a-second away from Gethin in seventeenth on debut, he finished eleventh, two laps down on race-winner Siffert. He qualified twelfth in Italy before an engine failure prompted his early retirement as teammate Gethin narrowly won. He outqualified the P160 of George Eaton by six-tenths in Canada, climbing from nineteenth to twelfth in the Grand Prix, ahead of Gethin. For the season-ending United States Grand Prix, Marko was handed the reins of the P160, where he finished thirteenth. With zero points from his five entries with Bonnier and BRM, he was not classified in the World Drivers' Championship. (Note: From 1960 to 2002, only the top-six finishers in Formula One Grands Prix were awarded World Championship points. Until 1995, drivers with no points were not classified in the World Drivers' Championship.)

==== 1972: Career-ending injury ====
Marko's career ended after projected debris pierced his visor at the French Grand Prix, blinding him in his left eye.

Marko retained his seat at BRM for 1972, again using the outdated P153 at the season-opening Argentine Grand Prix; he qualified nineteenth and held off the March of Niki Lauda for tenth, one place behind Howden Ganley in the updated P160B, which he followed with fourteenth in South Africa. He was replaced for the Spanish Grand Prix by Alex Soler-Roig and returned in Monaco, where he qualified seventeenth and climbed to eighth in the iterated P153B as Jean-Pierre Beltoise won in the P160B. Qualifying twenty-third in Belgium, driving the P160, he was assigned the P153B qualified by Vern Schuppan—2.8 seconds behind Marko—for the Grand Prix and climbed to tenth.

Marko was seriously injured during the French Grand Prix at Clermont-Ferrand—held a few weeks after the Targa Florio—when a sharp volcanic rock projected by the March of Ronnie Peterson on the ninth lap pierced his visor and left him permanently blinded in his left eye, ending his racing career aged 29. (Note: Some older sources, such as ESPN (1972), Motor Sport Retro (2013), The Guardian (2014) and Pitpass.com (2018) state that the stone was thrown up by Emerson Fittipaldi's Lotus, but more recent sources, such as GPBlog (2022), First Sportz (2022), The Sports Rush (2023) and PlanetF1 (2023) indicate that it was thrown up by Ronnie Peterson's March.) He had opted for the new P160B chassis with a raised cockpit, a decision that Marko later said contributed to his injury, and qualified a career-highest sixth. His Formula One career ended with zero points from 10 Grands Prix and a best finish of eighth.

== Management career ==
=== RSM Marko (1984–2003) ===
==== 1984–1998: Early years ====
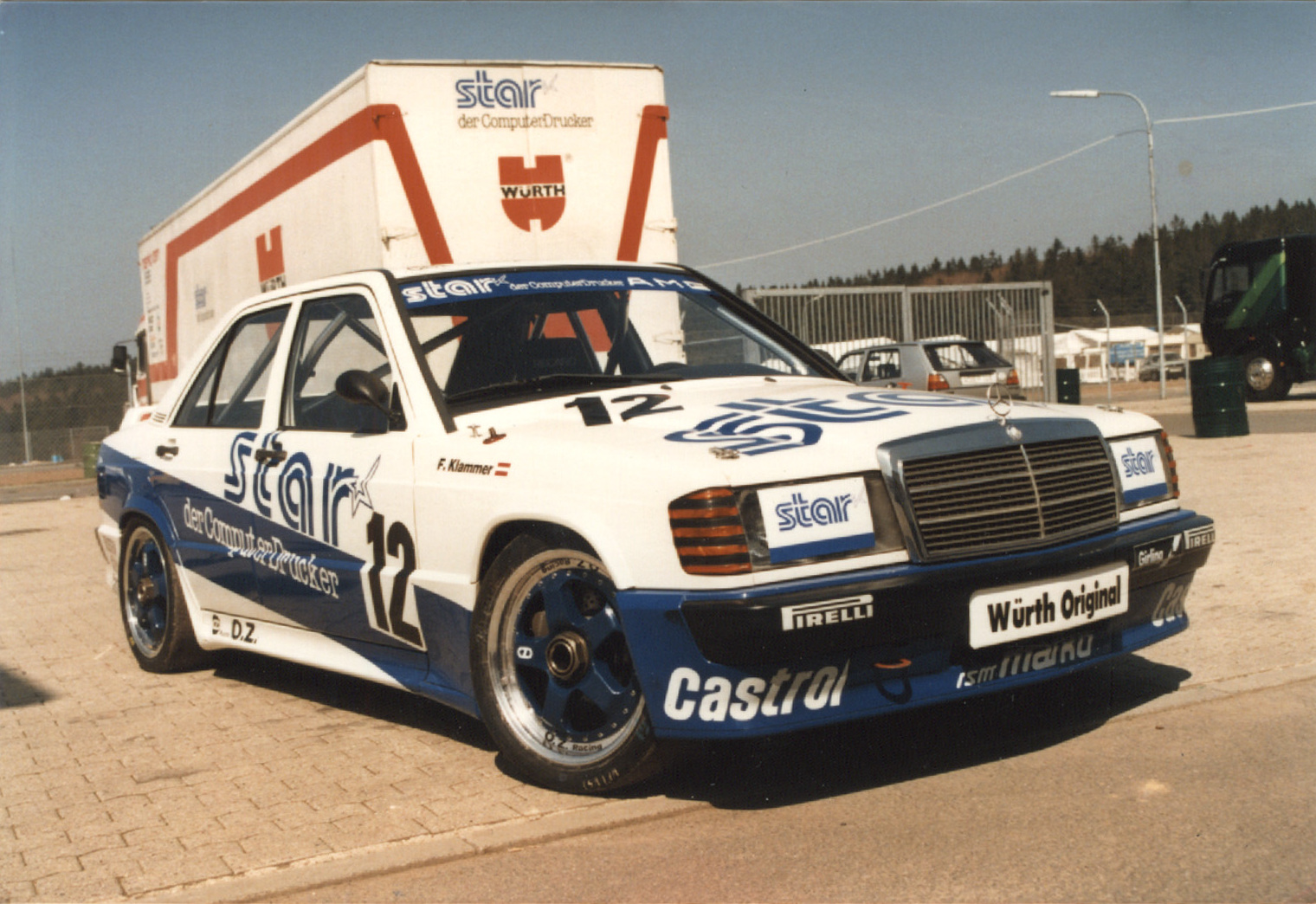
Marko founded RSM Marko in 1984 as a touring car racing team, later expanding to Formula Three and Formula 3000.

Marko was the manager for Austrian racing drivers Gerhard Berger and Karl Wendlinger for several years prior to founding RSM Marko in 1984, a racing team who competed in the Deutsche Tourenwagen Meisterschaft, Formula Three, and Formula 3000.

==== Affiliation with Red Bull (1999–2003) ====
From 1999 onwards, RSM Marko operated under the name Red Bull Junior Team under sponsorship from Austrian energy drink conglomerate Red Bull GmbH. In 2001, the operation with Red Bull became their European driver development programme, led by Marko.

=== Red Bull (2005–2025) ===
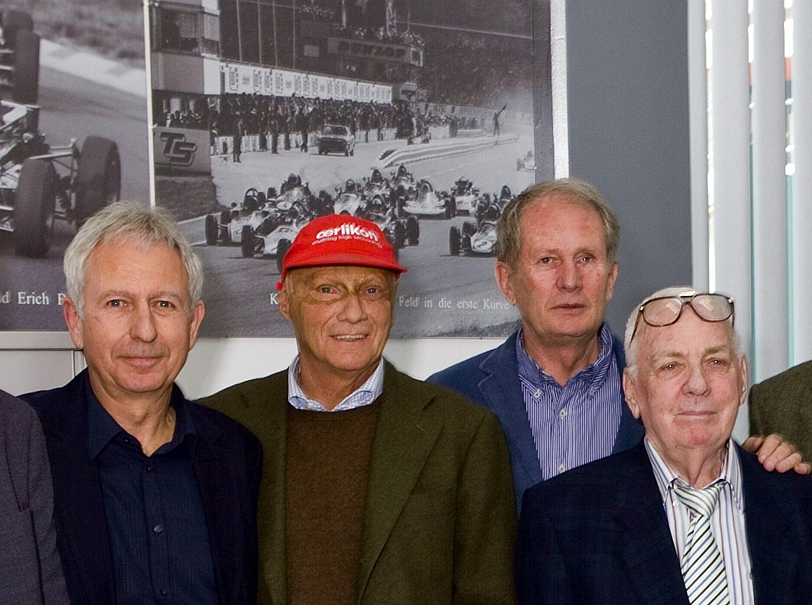
Marko (back) alongside fellow Austrian businessmen, including Niki Lauda (centre), in 2009

Until 2025, Marko was an adviser to all Formula One teams owned by Red Bull, including Red Bull Racing from its debut 2005 season onwards and its sister team from 2006 onwards, which competed as Toro Rosso (2006–2019), AlphaTauri (2020–2023), and Racing Bulls (2024–2025). Marko administered their driver development programme from its founding, which saw 16 drivers progress to Formula One, including Sebastian Vettel, Daniel Ricciardo, Max Verstappen, Carlos Sainz Jr., and Pierre Gasly. His Formula One graduates have won a combined eight World Drivers' Championship titles and 140 Grands Prix; Vettel won four consecutive titles from 2010 to 2013, which Verstappen repeated from 2021 to 2024.

==== 2005–2009: Early years ====
Marko joined Red Bull Racing as an adviser for its debut season in 2005, having overseen the Red Bull Junior Team since its founding as a driver development programme in 2001. He additionally joined sister team Toro Rosso when it debuted in 2006. Austrian driver Christian Klien had previously graduated Marko's programme in 2004 with Jaguar. Over the next five seasons, five drivers graduated the programme: Vitantonio Liuzzi (2005), Scott Speed (2006), Sebastian Vettel (2007), Sébastien Buemi (2009), and Jaime Alguersuari (2009). Klien and Liuzzi both featured in the Red Bull Racing's lineup for its debut campaign. Vettel claimed his maiden victory with Toro Rosso at the Italian Grand Prix in 2008 and was subsequently promoted to the senior team, finishing runner-up to Jenson Button in 2009.

==== 2010–2013: Consecutive titles with Vettel ====
From 2010 to 2013, Sebastian Vettel won four consecutive World Drivers' Championships, becoming the youngest-ever World Drivers' Champion and the first title-winning graduate of the Junior Team. Two drivers graduated Marko's programme during this span: Daniel Ricciardo (2011) and Jean-Éric Vergne (2012).

==== 2014–2020: Rise of Ricciardo and promotion of Verstappen ====
As Mercedes dominated the new regulations in 2014, Daniel Ricciardo displaced Sebastian Vettel as the lead Red Bull driver, prompting Vettel's move to Ferrari. Marko's 2014 graduate Daniil Kvyat served as his replacement for 2015 and 2016. In the former season, Toro Rosso served as a training ground for Marko's latest protégés: 17-year-old Max Verstappen and Carlos Sainz Jr. Verstappen was promoted to the senior team for the 2016 Spanish Grand Prix onwards, winning on debut to become the youngest-ever Grand Prix winner. He established himself as the lead driver over Ricciardo by the end of 2018, after which 2017 graduate Pierre Gasly joined him. Marko replaced him with former member Alexander Albon mid-way through 2019.

==== 2021–2024: Dominance with Verstappen and power struggles ====
From 2021 to 2024, Marko protégé Max Verstappen won four consecutive World Drivers' Championship titles and 53 Grands Prix. As Verstappen saw off junior graduates Pierre Gasly and Alexander Albon, Red Bull opted for Sergio Pérez as their replacement after private talks with Marko. Yuki Tsunoda (2021) and Liam Lawson (2023) debuted throughout this span. During this period, Marko and the Junior Team programme came under criticism for its cut-throat nature and recycling of talent as drivers fell shy of the mark set by Verstappen; in 2018, Damien Smith of Goodwood Road & Racing described it as "the hardest, most unforgiving school in motor sport".

Marko faced scrutiny in September 2023 for his comments regarding Pérez's lack of form throughout the 2023 season, following the Italian Grand Prix. Talking to Red Bull–owned broadcaster ServusTV, he was quoted saying "we know that he has problems in qualifying, he has fluctuations in form, he is South American and he is just not as completely focused in his head as [Verstappen] is, or as Sebastian Vettel". Marko's comments were widely perceived as racially charged, with many pointing out that Pérez—a Mexican national—is not South American. Marko apologised on 8 September, stating "I was trying to make a point that [Pérez] has fluctuated in his performance this year, but it was wrong to attribute this to his cultural heritage." Pérez accepted Marko's apology on 14 September and the FIA reprimanded him the following day. In March 2024, Marko faced an internal investigation and possible suspension at Red Bull over leaking insider information regarding team principal Christian Horner's alleged misconduct. Verstappen defended Marko through the investigation, indicating that he would leave if Marko was dropped. He was cleared of the allegations following talks with Red Bull GmbH executive Oliver Mintzlaff.

==== 2025: Retirement ====
With Red Bull's decision to release Sergio Pérez for 2025, Marko replaced him with Liam Lawson, who himself was replaced by Yuki Tsunoda after two Grands Prix. Marko attracted controversy over his comments regarding debut graduate Isack Hadjar's crash on the formation lap of the Australian Grand Prix. He described the incident as "embarrassing", with Hadjar later admitting he was also embarrassed. He later falsely claimed that Kimi Antonelli allowed Lando Norris to pass him at the Qatar Grand Prix to aid his title bid against Max Verstappen, prompting online abuse and death threats towards Antonelli. Marko retired from his management positions at the conclusion of the 2025 season, parting ways with the team with his final graduate—Arvid Lindblad—debuting in 2026.

== Personal life ==
Marko owns four hotels in Graz: the Schlossberghotel, Augartenhotel, Lendhotel, and Kai 36. He is an avid art collector and curates the pieces displayed within his hotels.

== Racing record ==
=== Complete World Sportscar Championship results ===
(key) (Races in bold indicate pole position; races in italics indicate fastest lap)

Year	Entrant	Chassis	Engine	Class	1	2	3	4	5	6	7	8	9	10	11
1968	Bosch Racing Team Vienna	Lotus Europa	Renault 807 1.6 I4	GT 1.6	DAY	SEB	BRH	MZA	TGA; DNA	NÜR	SPA	WGN			
1968	Bosch Racing Team	Porsche 906	Porsche Type 901/20 2.0 F6	S 2.0									**ZEL**; 1	LMS	
1969	Richard Gerin	Porsche 910	Porsche Type 901/20 2.0 F6	S 2.0	DAY	SEB	LMS	BRH	MZA	TGA	SPA	NÜR	WGN	ÖST; 1	
1970	Martini International Racing Team	Porsche 908/02	Porsche Type 908/02 3.0 F8	P 3.0	DAY	SEB	BRH	MZA	TGA	**SPA**; 2	NÜR; 3	LMS; 1	**WGN**; 1		
1970	Porsche KG Salzburg	Porsche 917K	Porsche Type 912 4.5 F12	S 5.0										ÖST; Ret	
1971	Martini International Racing Team	Porsche 917K	Porsche Type 912 4.5 F12	S 5.0	BUE; Ret	DAY; Ret	SEB	BRH	MZA; Ret	SPA; Ret	TGA		LMS; 1	ÖST; Ret	WGN
1971	Martini International Racing Team	Porsche 908/03	Porsche Type 908/03 3.0 F8	P 3.0								NÜR; 3			
1972	Autodelta SpA	Alfa Romeo T33/3	Alfa Romeo 3.0 V8	S 3.0	BUE; 4	DAY; 3	SEB; Ret	BRH; 6		SPA; DNA	TGA; 2	NÜR; 3	LMS; Ret		
1972	Bosch Racing Team	Porsche 908/02	Porsche Type 908/02 3.0 F8	S 3.0					MZA; DNS						
1972	Ferrari SpA	Ferrari 312 PB	Ferrari Tipo 001 3.0 F12	S 3.0										ÖST; 2	WGN

=== 24 Hours of Le Mans results ===
Year	Team	Co-Drivers	Car	Class	Laps	Pos.	Class Pos.
1970	(Germany) Martini International Racing Team	(Austria) Rudi Lins	Porsche 908/2LH	P 3.0	335	**3rd**	**1st**
1971	(Germany) Martini International Racing Team	(Netherlands) Gijs van Lennep	Porsche 917K	S 5.0	397	**1st**	**1st**
1972	(Italy) Autodelta SpA	(United Kingdom) Vic Elford	Alfa Romeo Tipo 33TT3	S 3.0	232	DNF	DNF

=== Complete British Saloon Car Championship results ===
(key) (Races in bold indicate pole position; races in italics indicate fastest lap.)

Year	Team	Car	Class	1	2	3	4	5	6	7	8	9	10	11	12	DC	Pts	Class
1970	BMW-Alpina	BMW 1600	C	BRH	SNE	THR	SIL	CRY	SIL	SIL; 7	CRO	BRH	OUL	BRH	BRH	40th	4	14th

=== Complete European Formula Two Championship results ===
(key)

Year	Entrant	Chassis	Engine	1	2	3	4	5	6	7	8	9	10	11	Pos.	Pts
1971	Ecurie Bonnier	Lola T240	Ford	HOC; Ret	THR	NÜR; 8	JAR; Ret	PAL	ROU						20th	1
1971	Constructions Mechanique Pygmée	Pygmée MDB16	Ford							MAN; Ret	TUL	ALB	VAL	VAL	20th	1

=== Complete Formula One results ===
(key)

Year	Entrant	Chassis	Engine	1	2	3	4	5	6	7	8	9	10	11	12	WDC	Pts
1971	Ecurie Bonnier	McLaren M7C	Ford Cosworth DFV 3.0 V8	RSA	ESP	MON	NED	FRA	GBR	GER; DNQ						NC	0
1971	Yardley-BRM	BRM P153	BRM P142 3.0 V12								AUT; 11	ITA; Ret	CAN; 12			NC	0
1971	Yardley-BRM	BRM P160	BRM P142 3.0 V12											USA; 13		NC	0
1972	Austria-Marlboro BRM	BRM P153	BRM P142 3.0 V12	ARG; 10	RSA; 14	ESP										NC	0
1972	Austria-Marlboro BRM	BRM P153B	BRM P142 3.0 V12				MON; 8	BEL; 10								NC	0
1972	Austria-Marlboro BRM	BRM P160B	BRM P142 3.0 V12						FRA; Ret	GBR	GER	AUT	ITA	CAN	USA	NC	0

== Notes ==
Sporting positions
Preceded by Hans Herrmann; Richard Attwood	Winner of the 24 Hours of Le Mans; 1971; With: Gijs van Lennep	Succeeded by Henri Pescarolo; Graham Hill
