= 1971 1000 km Buenos Aires =

Autodromo Municipal Ciudad de Buenos Aires No 14 (1968-1971)

The 1971 Buenos Aires 1000 Kilometers was the opening round of the 1971 International Championship for Makes season. It took place at the Buenos Aires circuit No.15, Argentina, on January 10, 1971. Grand tourer class cars did not participate in this event.

Scuderia Ferrari driver Ignazio Giunti was killed during the race. He was leading the race when his car ran into the back of the disabled Matra driver Jean-Pierre Beltoise was pushing to the pits. Both cars were caught on fire and Giunti was unable to escape.

== Official results ==
Class winners in bold. Cars failing to complete 70% of the winner's distance marked as Not Classified (NC).

Pos	Class	No	Team	Drivers	Chassis	Laps
Pos	Class	No	Team	Drivers	Engine	Laps
1	**S**	**30**	**(United Kingdom) J.W. Automotive**	**(Switzerland) Jo Siffert (United Kingdom) Derek Bell**	**Porsche 917K**	**165**
1	**S**	**30**	**(United Kingdom) J.W. Automotive**	**(Switzerland) Jo Siffert (United Kingdom) Derek Bell**	**Porsche 4.9L Flat-12**	**165**
2	S	32	(United Kingdom) J.W. Automotive	(Mexico) Pedro Rodríguez (United Kingdom) Jackie Oliver	Porsche 917K	164
2	S	32	(United Kingdom) J.W. Automotive	(Mexico) Pedro Rodríguez (United Kingdom) Jackie Oliver	Porsche 4.9L Flat-12	164
3	**P3.0**	**14**	**(Italy) Autodelta SpA**	**(Germany) Rolf Stommelen (Italy) Nanni Galli**	**Alfa Romeo T33/3**	**163**
3	**P3.0**	**14**	**(Italy) Autodelta SpA**	**(Germany) Rolf Stommelen (Italy) Nanni Galli**	**Alfa Romeo 3.0L V8**	**163**
4	P3.0	16	(Italy) Autodelta SpA	(Italy) Andrea de Adamich (France) Henri Pescarolo	Alfa Romeo 33TT3	161
4	P3.0	16	(Italy) Autodelta SpA	(Italy) Andrea de Adamich (France) Henri Pescarolo	Alfa Romeo 3.0L V8	161
5	S	20	(Spain) Escuderia Montjuich	(Spain) José Juncadella (Argentina) Carlos Pairetti	Ferrari 512S	155
5	S	20	(Spain) Escuderia Montjuich	(Spain) José Juncadella (Argentina) Carlos Pairetti	Ferrari 5.0L V12	155
6	S	18	(Belgium) Ecurie Francorchamps	(Belgium) Hughes de Fierlandt (Belgium) Gustave Gosselin	Ferrari 512S Spyder	153
6	S	18	(Belgium) Ecurie Francorchamps	(Belgium) Hughes de Fierlandt (Belgium) Gustave Gosselin	Ferrari 5.0L V12	153
7	S	8	(Switzerland) Scuderia Filipinetti	(United Kingdom) Mike Parkes (Sweden) Jo Bonnier	Ferrari 512M	150
7	S	8	(Switzerland) Scuderia Filipinetti	(United Kingdom) Mike Parkes (Sweden) Jo Bonnier	Ferrari 5.0L V12	150
8	S	22	(United States) North American Racing Team	(United States) Sam Posey (Argentina) Nestor García-Veiga (Argentina) Rubén Luis di Palma	Ferrari 512S Spyder	148
8	S	22	(United States) North American Racing Team	(United States) Sam Posey (Argentina) Nestor García-Veiga (Argentina) Rubén Luis di Palma	Ferrari 5.0L V12	148
9	P3.0	2	(United Kingdom) Ecurie Evergreen	(United Kingdom) Chris Craft (United Kingdom) Trevor Taylor	McLaren M8C	146
9	P3.0	2	(United Kingdom) Ecurie Evergreen	(United Kingdom) Chris Craft (United Kingdom) Trevor Taylor	Ford 3.0 V8	146
10	S	34	(Switzerland) Zitro Racing	(Switzerland) Dominique Martin (Argentina) Pablo Bréa	Porsche 917K	145
10	S	34	(Switzerland) Zitro Racing	(Switzerland) Dominique Martin (Argentina) Pablo Bréa	Porsche 4.9L Flat-12	145
11	**P2.0**	**6**	**(United Kingdom) Ecurie Evergreen**	**(United States) David Weir (Argentina) Jorge Omar del Río**	**Lola T210**	**143**
11	**P2.0**	**6**	**(United Kingdom) Ecurie Evergreen**	**(United States) David Weir (Argentina) Jorge Omar del Río**	**Ford Cosworth FVC 1.8L I4**	**143**
12	P2.0	10	(Switzerland) Scuderia Filipinetti	(Sweden) Ronnie Peterson (Argentina) Jorge Cupeiro	Lola T212	130
12	P2.0	10	(Switzerland) Scuderia Filipinetti	(Sweden) Ronnie Peterson (Argentina) Jorge Cupeiro	Ford Cosworth FVC 1.8L I4	130
13	P2.0	46	(France) Daniel Rouveyran	(France) Daniel Rouveyran (Argentina) Carlos Ruesch	Lola T210	129
13	P2.0	46	(France) Daniel Rouveyran	(France) Daniel Rouveyran (Argentina) Carlos Ruesch	Ford Cosworth FVC 1.8L I4	129
14 DNF	S	48	(Germany) Team Auto Usdau	(Germany) Reinhold Joest (Argentina) Angel Monguzzi	Porsche 917K	85
14 DNF	S	48	(Germany) Team Auto Usdau	(Germany) Reinhold Joest (Argentina) Angel Monguzzi	Porsche 4.9L Flat-12	85
15 DNF	S	38	(Germany) Martini International Racing	(United Kingdom) Vic Elford (France) Gérard Larrousse	Porsche 917K	65
15 DNF	S	38	(Germany) Martini International Racing	(United Kingdom) Vic Elford (France) Gérard Larrousse	Porsche 4.9L Flat-12	65
16 DNF	P3.0	40	(Germany) Team Auto Usdau	(Germany) Hans-Dieter Weigel (Argentina) Eduardo Copello	Porsche 908/02	54
16 DNF	P3.0	40	(Germany) Team Auto Usdau	(Germany) Hans-Dieter Weigel (Argentina) Eduardo Copello	Porsche 3.0L Flat-8	54
17 DNF	S	28	(Spain) Escuderia Nacional CS	(Brazil) Emerson Fittipaldi (Argentina) Carlos Reutemann	Porsche 917K	43
17 DNF	S	28	(Spain) Escuderia Nacional CS	(Brazil) Emerson Fittipaldi (Argentina) Carlos Reutemann	Porsche 4.9L Flat-12	43
18 DNF	P3.0	24	(Italy) SpA Ferrari SEFAC	(Italy) Ignazio Giunti (Italy) Arturo Merzario	Ferrari 312PB	38
18 DNF	P3.0	24	(Italy) SpA Ferrari SEFAC	(Italy) Ignazio Giunti (Italy) Arturo Merzario	Ferrari 3.0L V12	38
19 DNF	P3.0	26	(France) Matra Sports	(France) Jean-Pierre Beltoise (France) Jean-Pierre Jabouille	Matra-Simca MS660	36
19 DNF	P3.0	26	(France) Matra Sports	(France) Jean-Pierre Beltoise (France) Jean-Pierre Jabouille	Matra 3.0L V12	36
20 DNF	P2.0	4	(United Kingdom) Ecurie Evergreen	(United Kingdom) Alain de Cadenet (Argentina) Nasif Estéfano	Lola T210	27
20 DNF	P2.0	4	(United Kingdom) Ecurie Evergreen	(United Kingdom) Alain de Cadenet (Argentina) Nasif Estéfano	Ford FVC 1.8L I4	27
21 DNF	S	44	(Argentina) Eduardo Pino	(Argentina) Eduardo Pino (Argentina) Jorge Ternengo	Baufer-Ford	8
21 DNF	S	44	(Argentina) Eduardo Pino	(Argentina) Eduardo Pino (Argentina) Jorge Ternengo	Chevrolet V8	8
22 DNF	S	36	(Germany) Martini International Racing	(Austria) Helmut Marko (Netherlands) Gijs van Lennep	Porsche 917K	2
22 DNF	S	36	(Germany) Martini International Racing	(Austria) Helmut Marko (Netherlands) Gijs van Lennep	Porsche 4.9L Flat-12	2
DNS	P3.0	12	(Italy) Autodelta SpA	(Brazil) Emerson Fittipaldi (Netherlands) Toine Hezemans	Alfa Romeo T33/3	-
DNS	P3.0	12	(Italy) Autodelta SpA	(Brazil) Emerson Fittipaldi (Netherlands) Toine Hezemans	Alfa Romeo 3.0L V8	-
DNS	P2.0	42	(Argentina) Oreste Berta	(Argentina) Luis Rubén di Palma (Argentina) Carlos Marincovich	Berta LR	-
DNS	P2.0	42	(Argentina) Oreste Berta	(Argentina) Luis Rubén di Palma (Argentina) Carlos Marincovich	Renault	-

== Statistics ==
- Pole Position - #32 J.W. Automotive - 1:52.70
- Fastest Lap - #30 J.W. Automotive - 1:51.53
- Average Speed - 186.229 km/h

World Sportscar Championship
Previous race: 1970 Austrian 1000km	1971 season	Next race: 1971 24 Hours of Daytona
