= Surtees TS11 =

Formula 5000 race car

The Surtees TS11 is an open-wheel Formula 5000 race car, designed, developed and built by Surtees in 1972. It is closely based on the Surtees TS9 Formula One car. It is powered by a 302 cu in (5 L) Chevrolet engine. Dutchman Gijs van Lennep won the 1972 Rothmans European Formula 5000 Championship driving the TS11, finishing the season with 65 points, and winning two races. It also contested in eight non-championship Formula One Grand Prix races, with its best results being two ninth-place finishes.
