= Ferrari 512 =

Car model

Ferrari 512 S Ferrari 512 M
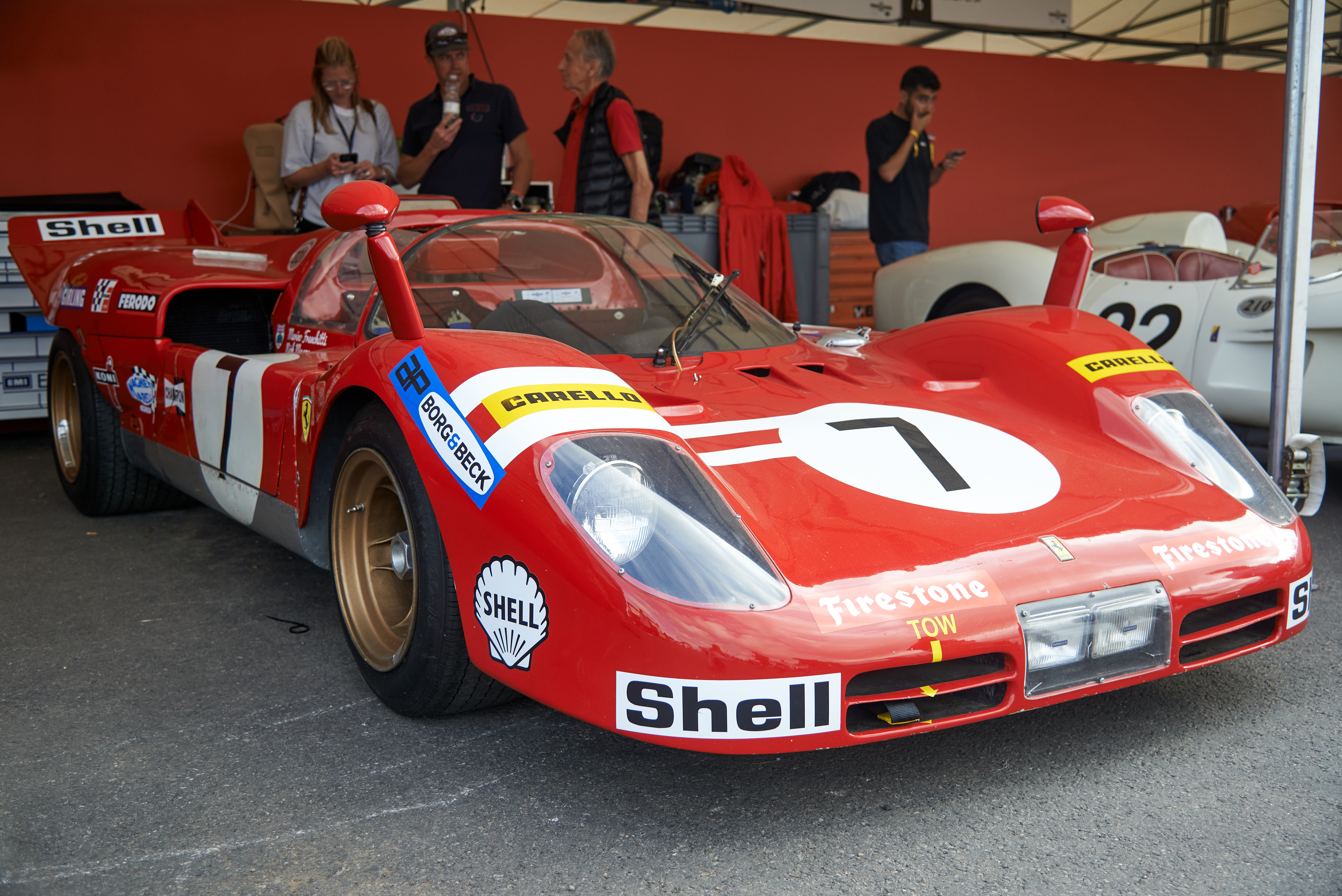
- Ferrari 512 S
- Category: Group 5 sports car
- Constructor: Ferrari
- Designers: Mauro Forghieri; Giacomo Caliri; Gioacchino Colombo

Technical specifications
- Chassis: Steel tube space frame with riveted aluminium panels
- Suspension (front): Double wishbone, outboard coil spring/Koni damper, anti-roll bar
- Suspension (rear): Single top-link, reversed lower wishbone, twin radius arms, outboard coil spring/Koni damper, anti-roll bar
- Axle track: 1,518 mm (59.8 in) front 1,511 mm (59.5 in) rear
- Wheelbase: 2,400 mm (94.5 in)
- Engine: Ferrari 4,993.53 cc (304.7 cu in) DOHC, 48-valve, 60° V12, naturally-aspirated, mid-mounted
- Transmission: Ferrari 5-speed manual
- Power: 404 kW (550 hp) @ 8500 rpm (512 S), 449 kW (610 hp) @ 9000 rpm (512 M)
- Weight: 815–840 kg (1,796.8–1,851.9 lb)
- Brakes: Girling disc brakes
- Tyres: Firestone 90-24-15 front 14.5-26.2-15 rear
- Clutch: Borg & Beck dry twin-plate

Competition history
- Notable entrants: (Italy) Scuderia Ferrari (United States) Team Penske (512 M)
- Debut: 1970 24 Hours of Daytona
- First win: 1970 12 Hours of Sebring

Ferrari 512 S
Ferrari 512 S at Goodwood Festival of Speed 2009

Ferrari 512 S was a sports prototype car produced by Italian manufacturer Ferrari from late 1969 to 1970. As its name suggests, the car had a 5.0L V12 engine, and was homologated as a Group 5 Sportscar of which a total number of 25 units had to be made. Porsche had already done the same in April 1969 with the Porsche 917, while other Sportscars in the 5-litre class, Ferrari 250 LM, Ford GT40 Mk.I, Lola T70, had been built mainly in 1964, 1965 or 1967.

Several 512S were entered in the 1970 International Championship for Makes by the factory Scuderia Ferrari and private teams. Later that year, modified versions resembling their main competitor, the Porsche 917, were called Ferrari 512 M (for modificata). In the 1971 International Championship for Makes, the factory focused on the new Ferrari 312 PB and abandoned the 512 which was only entered by privateers. From 1972 onwards, the 512 (as the 917) was withdrawn from the world championship following a change in the regulations; some 512s in private hands went on to compete in the Can-Am and Interserie races.

== History ==
In the mid-1960s, Ferrari had competed in sports prototype racing with the Ferrari P series of 4-litre V12 cars, winning the Le Mans consecutively until 1965. Only very few of the works cars, named 330P4 in 1967, had been handed over to customers teams, often with a simplified engine and named 412P. In 1966 and 1967, the Ford GT40 Mk.II and Mk.IV won Le Mans, using a 7.0-litre engine, and achieving speeds considered too high by the rule makers of FIA/CSI. For 1968, the rules were changed limiting Group 6 prototypes to a maximum engine capacity of 3.0 litres, as in Formula One. Despite having a suitable engine, Ferrari sat out the 1968 season, to return in 1969 with the Ferrari 312 P. For that year, Porsche had taken full advantage of the Group 4 rules, like they already had done in 1966 with making at least 50 Porsche 906 and later 25 Porsche 910, as they were sure they could sell these 2-litre-cars to customers, while Ferrari had failed to build more than 18 of the Dino 206 S, thus it never earned the S. In late 1968, Porsche made the risky investment of developing and building 25 examples of the 4.5-litre Porsche 917 to allow homologation into the FIA's Group 4 (5 in 1970) sports car category for 1969.

The Sportscar racing world was surprised by the 917 showing up in March 1969 at the Geneva Motor Show. It surely would be a force until 1971, for the three remaining seasons 5 liter sportscars would be allowed. Already being in the process of selling half of his business to Fiat, Enzo Ferrari diverted a part of these funds to match the Porsche investment. While Porsche already delivered 917, additional 512S cars were intended to be sold to racing customers, which meant that several dozen high powered sports cars were available, and with each requiring two drivers in an endurance race, there was a shortage of experienced pilots.

The engine of the 512 S was a completely new 60° V12 with 560 PS (412 kW) output. Compared to Porsche's air-cooled flat-12, it needed a maze of cooling pipes and heavy radiators. Since the chassis was of steel, reinforced with aluminium sheet, weight was 100 kg more than that of the alloy-framed 917. Notwithstanding the weight difference and higher center of gravity, the Ferrari 512 S and Porsche 917 seemed fairly evenly matched.

At the beginning of 1970 the Ferrari 512s were hampered by predictable early problems, including a weak suspension and transmission problems, but the fact that Porsche already had six months of equally mixed experiences with its 917 in 1969, leading to the improved 917K, would be decisive for the rest of the season.

In contrast to Porsche, Ferrari did not organise an intramural competition. At Porsche, JWA Gulf, KG Porsche Salzburg, and later Martini Racing all received direct factory support, in the form of loaned cars, engines, upgrades and know-how. Thus, at least four cars were real works cars, without putting travelling strain on the factory itself, as racing personnel and funds were provided by these professional teams (while Porsche still paid factory drivers like Jo Siffert and Brian Redman in JWA cars). And even the Porsche 917 privateers like AAW Shell Racing and David Piper Racing received much better support than Ferrari's clients. Ferrari did not adopt this modern scheme, but entered cars themselves in the traditional manner, as "Spa Ferrari SEFAC". Having only a few Formula One drivers under contract in the previous years, with the sports car aces since 1966 driving in a fleet of Porsches, Ferrari could barely find qualified drivers for its entries. Besides the factory cars, there were the private cars of Scuderia Filipinetti, NART, Écurie Francorchamps, Scuderia Picchio Rosso, Gelo Racing Team and Escuderia Montjuich. Those private cars never received the same support from the factory. They were considered as field fillers, never as candidates for a win.

== Racing ==
Early in the 1970 season, Ferrari won the 1970 12 Hours of Sebring, but the Porsche 917 and the additional Porsche 908/03 at twisty tracks took the remaining nine wins of the championship season. At the 1970 24 Hours of Le Mans, the Ferrari suffered from reliability problems, although it was considered to be equally fast to the 917. Four 512s were entered by Ferrari for that race, but the Vaccarella/Giunti car was out after seven laps, the Merzario/Regazzoni car was out after 38 laps and the Bell/Peterson car was out a lap later, and about five hours later the Ickx/Schetty car was out after 142 laps. For speed tracks such as Le Mans, Spa, Monza and the Österreichring, an extra long rear body panel was fitted on the car.

The modified 512 M had proven to be fast at the end of the season, and Ickx/Giunti also won the Kyalami 9 Hours non-championship Springbok nine-hours race. As the permit for the five litre sports cars expired after 1971, Ferrari decided to abandon factory entries of the 512 in favor of developing a new three litre prototype, the Ferrari 312 PB.

In 1971, Penske entered an improved 512 M (No. 1040) in Sunoco livery which was able to challenge the 917, taking pole position several times. The main competition for Porsche came from Alfa Romeo Tipo 33, though.

== Cars built ==
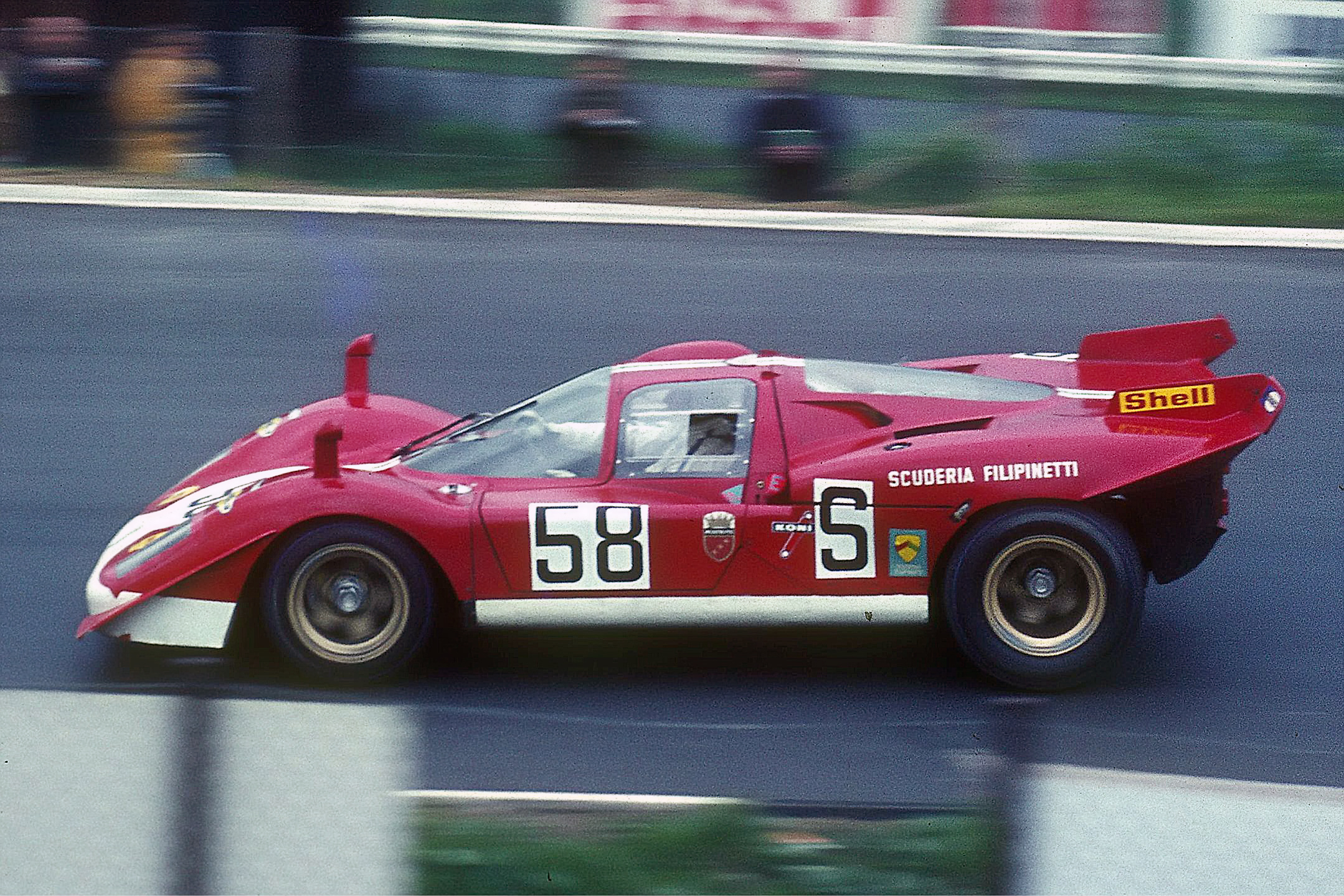
Mike Parkes with Scuderia Filipinetti's Ferrari 512 S (No. 1008) at 1000km Nürburgring 1970, finishing fourth with Herbert Müller

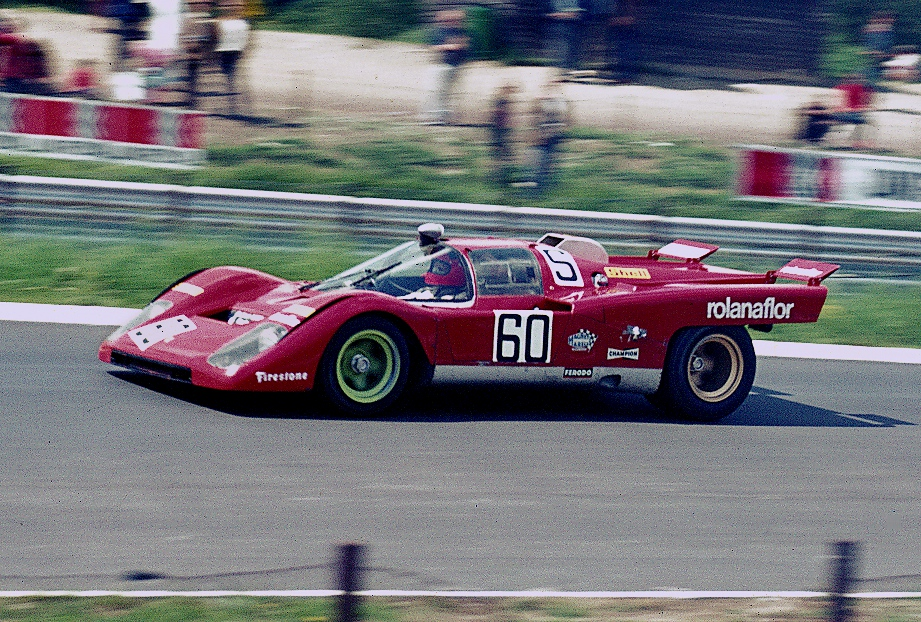
Modified Ferrari 512 M (No. 1044) of Herbert Müller, 1971 on the Nürburgring

Just in time for the 24h of Daytona that started on 31 January 1970, Ferrari presented the required number of 25 512 S to the homologation authorities. They accepted 17 complete cars and eight assembly kits, while a similar "basket case" in Zuffenhausen was rejected until 25 complete Porsche 917 were lined up on 20 April 1969. The 512S were fitted with the traditional even chassis numbers, ranging from 1002 to 1050. Of these, 19 were raced in 1970, five of them being spyders with an open roof. Scuderia Ferrari put in a factory WSC effort only in 1970, culminating in the 1970 24 Hours of Le Mans wet race of attrition, with a total of nine long-tail Ferrari 512S being entered, four by the factory, seven by privateers, with only two customers cars finishing, 4th and 5th behind three Porsche. Coming later and leaving early, Ferrari could not use up or sell off all cars, unlike Porsche, which not only built the initial 25 cars for Group 4 homologation, but from 1969 to 1973 over 50 917s in total, including those made to Group 7 rules of Can-Am and Interserie.

The only 512 chassis winning a World Championship race was No. 1026 at the 1970 12 Hours of Sebring. In addition, No. 1010, now already a modified 512M, won the non-championship November 1970 Kyalami 9 Hours in South Africa.

A number of the 25 cars manufactured for the 1970 season were not raced that year. Number 1020 was converted to 512 M specifications at the end of the season and sold to NART, which entered it in competition in 1971. Number 1024 remained unsold in 1970, was transformed into a 512 M and sold one year later to the Scuderia Brescia Corse. Car number 1036 was used as test car by the racing division of Ferrari; later it was sold to Solar Productions for Steve McQueen's Le Mans, also known as French Kiss with Death. Lastly, number 1036 was converted to an open-top version and raced in Can-Am in 1974.

Car 1040, sold to Chris Cord and Steve Earle, was a 512M that was further improved by Penske and entered with Sunoco sponsorship in 1971 at Daytona, Sebring, Le Mans and Watkins Glen. The car, driven mainly by Mark Donohue, was fast on regular circuits, setting the pole positions at the American tracks, while only the three long tail Porsche 917 were faster at Le Mans. Number 1048 was sold as a test car to Scuderia Filipinetti and was not raced in 1970. Car number 1050 was sold to Corrado Manfredini (but only as chassis plus body); after it was combined with parts of Nos. 1022 and 1032, it was transformed into a 512 M and campaigned in 1971.

In total, the factory team used nine cars for international endurance racing. The Scuderia Filipinetti (Switzerland, Herbert Müller) and NART raced two cars each. Écurie Francorchamps (Belgian importer of Ferrari), Escuderia Montjuich (Spain), Gelo Racing Team (Germany) and Picchio Rosso raced one car each. After the 1022, bought by the last team, was destroyed at the 24 Hours of Daytona, they would use the 1032.

During the 1970 race season several other Ferraris 512 Ss were destroyed. That was the case with the 1012 spyder after its crash at practice for the ADAC 1000km Nürburgring. Car number 1026, having been raced as factory car No. 7 by Derek Bell and Ronnie Peterson at the 1970 Le Mans 24 hours, was destroyed at the hands of Derek Bell during the Le Mans film production. Chassis number 1032 was subject of controversy in the 1980s, and even Christie's was involved. On the reconversion of the 1032 into a 512 M parts were used to rebuild it on the 1050 chassis.

One chassis and V12 engine was used by Pininfarina for the Ferrari Modulo. In July 1971, Pedro Rodriguez, racing Porsche 917K for Gulf Wyer in two World Championship seasons, fatally crashed the chassis 1008 Ferrari 512M of Scuderia Filipinetti/Müller in the non-WC Norisring race in Nuremberg.

== The drivers of the 512 S factory cars ==
Compared with Porsche which, from the mid-1960s, strived to align with the top sports car drivers of that era, Ferrari's Mauro Forghieri could not count exclusively on top racers in their quest to win the 1970 International Championship for Makes, as Ferrari had abandoned sports car racing after 1967, save for a few entries in 1969 with the Ferrari 312 P. Clay Regazzoni and Jacky Ickx, who had returned from Brabham, were Ferrari's F1 men for 1970, but as endurance racing typically requires two drivers per car, at least six more drivers were needed to enter four cars, to match the four or more Porsche factory-backed entries. Also, Alfa Romeo and Matra entered factory prototype cars, and competed for drivers and other personnel.

Starting the season, former Ferrari works driver Pedro Rodríguez had returned to JWA Gulf Racing of John Wyer who now raced Porsche 917, and to BRM in F1, while another former works racer, Chris Amon was now involved in F1 with March, just like Mario Andretti.

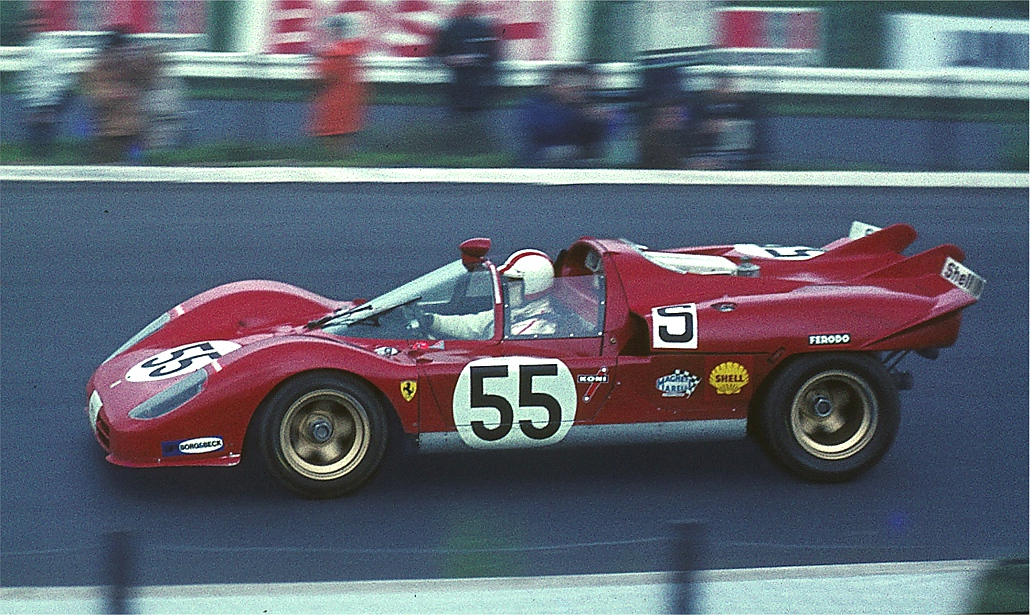
Nino Vaccarella driving Ferrari 512 S Spyder (chassis No. 1042) at the 1970 1000km Nürburgring, finishing third with Surtees

It was scheduled that Regazzoni, Ickx, Ignazio Giunti, Peter Schetty, Nino Vaccarella and Arturo Merzario should race as many rounds as possible. Only Vaccarella and Schetty were free from F1 obligations. Although fast, they were not such typical all-rounders as Jo Siffert, Brian Redman, Vic Elford, Hans Herrmann and Pedro Rodriguez (of them Siffert raced in F1 for March and Rodriguez raced F1 for BRM, but had not the same heavy testing duties as most other F1 racers), who all could drive, for example, the ultra-fast Spa-Francorchamps in a flat-12 917K just as competently as they could drive the twisty, winding and extremely long Targa Florio course in a flat-8 908. Ferrari only entered one car in the 1970 Targa Florio, a 512S driven by Giunti and Vaccarella, whereas Porsche did not bother to race the big 917K and entered 4 nimble Porsche 908/03 cars in the event and won it 1-2 in 1970. Although all of the Ferrari drivers were just as capable, they were not as available as the Porsche drivers. Vaccarella was "the man of the rocky mountains" at the Targa Florio, and 1969 European Hill Climb Championship winner Schetty was the specialist of hillclimbing racing, where Porsche was also a dominant factor until discontinuing factory efforts in the late 1960s. Derek Bell and Jackie Oliver were also unavailable at most endurance races, since they drove F1 for Brabham and BRM. John Surtees, who had quit Ferrari in 1966 after an argument with Eugenio Dragoni, returned for the races in Monza, Spa and at the Nürburgring.

Whilst JWA Gulf, Porsche Salzburg and Martini Racing could count on stable pairings for the whole season, Ferrari's race director Mauro Forghieri had to change his pairings over and over. Eventually his top racer Mario Andretti could only be present for the three American rounds (Daytona, Sebring and Watkins Glen). In total 12 different drivers were seen in 1970 at the wheel of a factory 512 S. Of them the promising Ignazio Giunti did nine of the ten rounds, being only absent at the BOAC 1000 km. Merzario and Vaccarella made seven entries, Ickx and Schetty six of the ten. Only Vaccarella and Surtees were 35 years old or older. Except for Clay Regazzoni (31), all others were younger than 30 years, with Ickx (25), Peterson (26), Merzario (27) and Bell (28). Peterson was only hired for Le Mans, a serious mistake by Forghieri who should have offered him a full year contract.

Another handicap for Ferrari was its full season commitment to F1 racing, so that the 512 S cars did not receive full technical help at all times. Ickx finished second in the 1970 F1 World Championship and won three races, while Regazzoni finished third and won once. Both failed to surpass the points tally of late Jochen Rindt, who had a fatal accident during practice for the 1970 Italian Grand Prix.

Of the 12 works racers on Ferrari 512 S in 1970, nine were still alive in the 2000s. Ignazio Giunti was killed in Buenos Aires in January 1971, driving the brand new Ferrari 312PB. He was leading the 1971 1000 km Buenos Aires race when he collided with the Matra which Jean-Pierre Beltoise was attempting to push back to the pits after running out of fuel. Giunti sustained injuries from which he would not survive. Ronnie Peterson, who started his F1 career in 1971, died from injuries that occurred during the 1978 Italian Grand Prix start. Regazzoni, having been paralyzed from the waist down following an accident at the 1980 United States Grand Prix West, died in a car accident in Italy on 15 December 2006.

== See also ==
- Ferrari 512 S Modulo

== Bibliography ==
- Bamsey, Ian (1 October 1986). Ferrari 312 & 512 Sports Racing Cars: The Porsche Hunters. G T Foulis & Co Ltd. ISBN 978-0-85429-577-7.
