= Porsche flat-twelve engine =

Porsche flat-12 engine
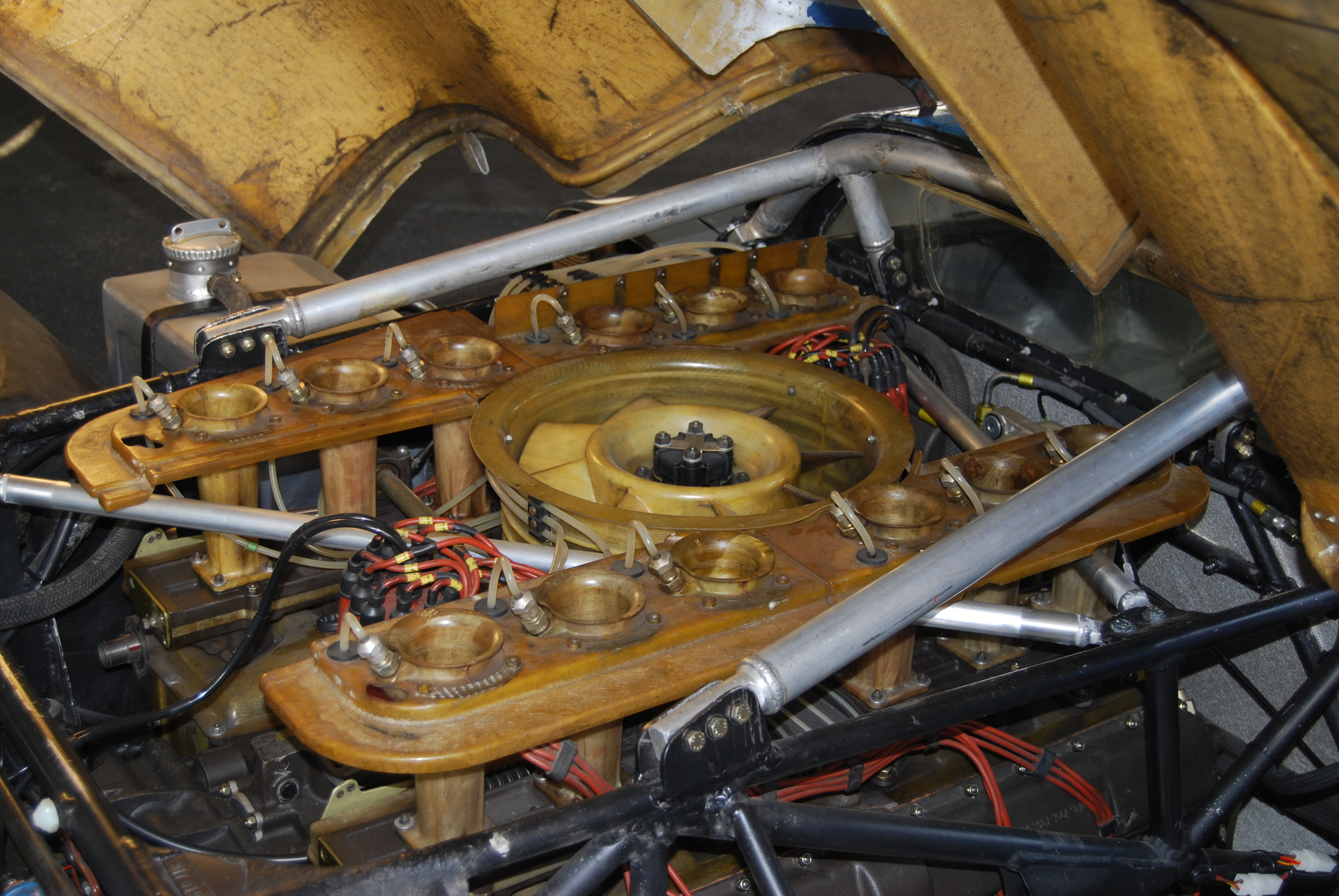

Overview
- Manufacturer: (Germany) Porsche
- Designer: Hans Mezger
- Also called: Type 912
- Production: 1969–1973

Layout
- Configuration: 180° flat-12
- Displacement: 4.5 L (4,494 cc); 5.0 L (4,999 cc); 5.4 L (5,374 cc)
- Cylinder bore: 85 mm (3.3 in); 86.8 mm (3.4 in); 90 mm (3.5 in)
- Piston stroke: 66 mm (2.6 in); 70.4 mm (2.8 in)
- Valvetrain: 24-valve, DOHC, two-valves per cylinder

Combustion
- Turbocharger: Yes (Twin-turbocharged; some models)
- Fuel system: Mechanical multiport fuel injection
- Fuel type: Gasoline
- Oil system: Dry sump
- Cooling system: Air-cooled

Output
- Power output: 520–1,600 hp (388–1,193 kW)
- Torque output: 350–1,450 lb⋅ft (475–1,966 N⋅m)

Porsche produced a series of flat-twelve engines for their Porsche 917 sports prototype between 1969 and 1973. The early engines were naturally-aspirated, while later examples were twin-turbocharged and extremely powerful.

== Overview ==
The 'Type 912' engine was designed by chief engineer Hans Mezger under the leadership of Ferdinand Piëch and Helmuth Bott. The 4.5-litre air-cooled design was a combination of 2 of Porsche's 2.25 L flat-6 engines used in previous racing cars. The engine featured a 180° flat-12 cylinder layout, twin overhead camshafts driven from centrally mounted gears and twin spark plugs fed from two distributors. The large horizontally mounted cooling fan was also driven from centrally mounted gears.

It was Porsche's first 12-cylinder engine and used many components made of titanium, magnesium, and exotic alloys that had been developed for the lightweight "Bergspider" hill climb racers. Other methods of weight reduction were rather simple, such as making the gear shift knob out of birch wood, some methods were not simple, such as using the tubular frame itself as oil piping to the front oil cooler. By 1971, the original 4.5-litre engine, which had produced around 520 hp in 1969, had been enlarged through 4.9-litres (600 hp) to 5-litres and produced a maximum of 630 hp.

Favoured to win, Gulf-backed John Wyer Automotive lined up three 917Ks; two with the 4.9-litre engine, and one with the 4.5-litre unit. Two 917 LH were entered in Le Mans, one in white and red trim by Porsche Salzburg. Driven by Vic Elford and Kurt Ahrens, the pole sitter's 4.9-litre engine dropped an inlet valve after 225 laps. Both drivers had also been entered on the team's other car, a red and white 917K with the 4.5-litre engine, qualified by Hans Herrmann and Richard Attwood in rather low 15th spot, but they did not drive after their own car failed.

The car with the 4.5 L engine gained the nickname of the Hippie Car or the Psychedelic Porsche from the team and media. At the end it was the red and white #23 917K of Porsche Salzburg, with the standard 4.5-litre engine, carefully driven by Stuttgart's own Hans Herrmann and Englishman Richard Attwood through the pouring rain, that finally scored the first overall win at Le Mans, in a wet race that saw only 7 ranked finishers.

The domination of Gulf-Wyer and Martini Porsches in 1971 was overwhelming. The only potential challenger to the 917 appeared early in the season: Roger Penske had bought a used 512S chassis that was dismantled and rebuilt beyond M specification. The car was specially tuned for long races, receiving many unique features among which were a larger rear wing and an aviation-inspired quick refueling system. The engine was tuned by Can-Am V8 specialist Traco and able to deliver more than 600 hp (450 kW).

As the new rules for the 3-litre prototypes were not favorable to their existing low-weight, low-power Porsche 908, Porsche decided against developing a new high power engine that could keep up with the F1-based engine designs of the competition — at least in naturally aspirated form. In 1976 they would return to sport-prototype racing with the turbocharged Porsche 936 race cars after the engines were tested in Porsche 911 versions.

After their successes with the 917 mainly in Europe, Porsche instead decided to focus on the North American markets and the Can-Am Challenge. For that series, larger and more powerful engines were needed. Although a 16-cylinder engine with about 750 hp (560 kW) was tested, a turbocharged 12-cylinder engine with comparable power output was ultimately used.

The turbocharged 850 hp (630 kW) 917/10K entered by Penske Racing won the 1972 series with George Follmer, after a testing accident sidelined primary driver Mark Donohue. This broke the five-year stranglehold McLaren had on the series. The further evolution of the 917, the 917/30 with revised aerodynamics, a longer wheelbase and an even stronger 5.4-litre engine with around 1,100 horsepower (820 kW) in race trim, won the 1973 edition winning all races but two when Charlie Kemp won the Mosport race and George Follmer won Road Atlanta and Mark Donohue won the rest. Most of the opposition was made of private 917/10K as McLaren, unable to compete against the 917 turbos, had already left the series to concentrate on Formula 1(and USAC, for several years).

The 917 and its engine's domination, the oil crisis, and fiery tragedies like Roger Williamson's in Zandvoort pushed the SCCA to introduce a 3 miles per U.S. gallon maximum fuel consumption rule for 1974. Due to this change, the Penske 917/30 competed in only one race in 1974, and some customers retrofitted their 917/10K with naturally aspirated engines.

The 917/30 was the most powerful sports car racer ever built and raced. The 5.374-litre 12 cylinder (90.0 x 70.4 mm) twin-turbocharged engine could produce around 1,100 bhp (820 kW) at 7,800 rpm in race trim. The 917/30 dominated the Can-Am series during the 1973 season. The 917 was also the only championship-winning car in Can-Am not to be powered by Chevrolet.

== Applications ==
- Porsche 917
