= Gijs van Lennep =

Dutch racing driver (born 1942)

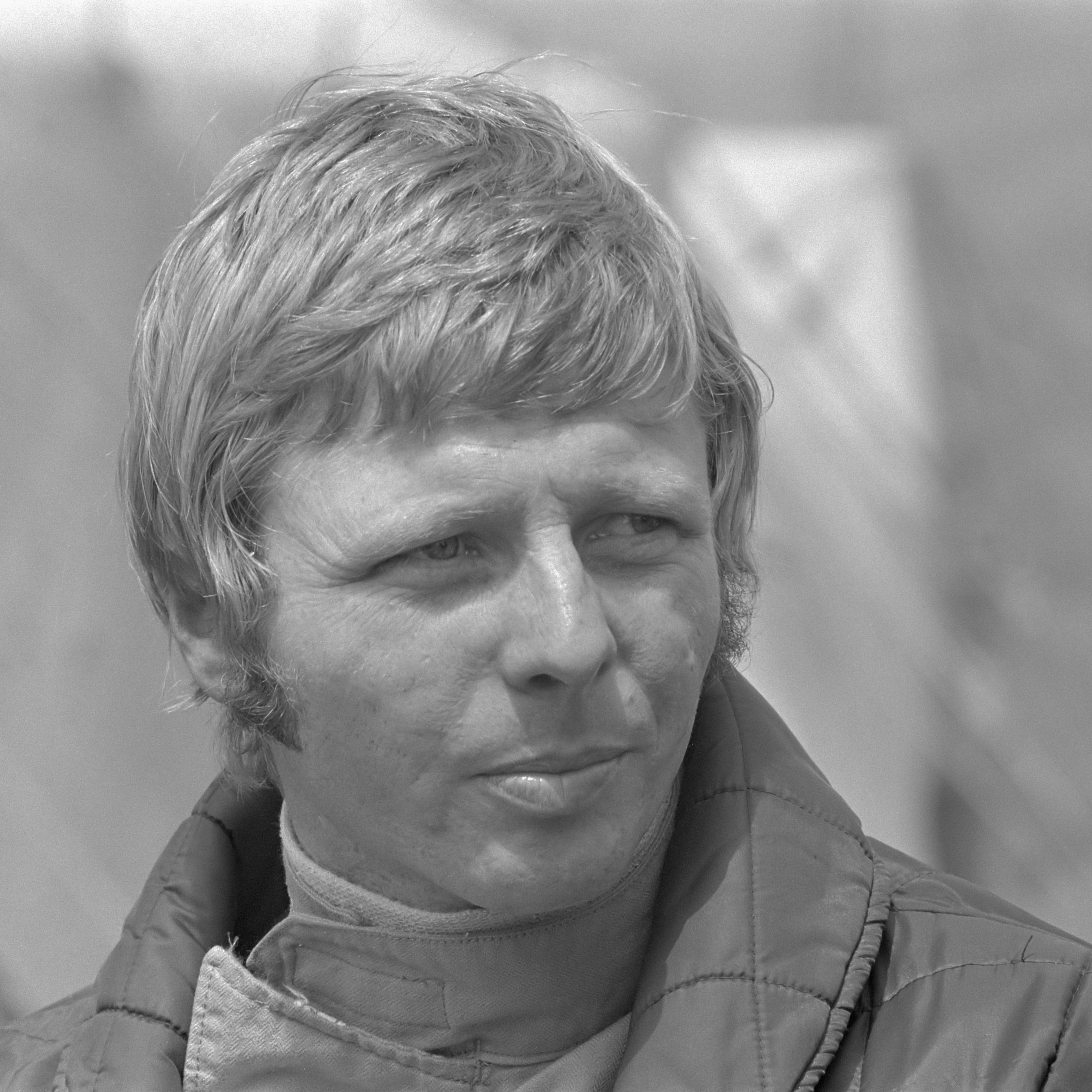
- van Lennep, 1971
- Born: Gijsbert van Lennep; 16 March 1942 (age 84); Aerdenhout, Netherlands

Formula One World Championship career
- Nationality: (Netherlands) Dutch
- Active years: 1971, 1973–1975
- Team(s): S.A.N, Williams, Ensign
- Entries: 10 (8 starts)
- Championships: 0
- Wins: 0
- Podiums: 0
- Career points: 2
- Pole positions: 0
- Fastest laps: 0
- First entry: 1971 Dutch Grand Prix
- Last entry: 1975 German Grand Prix

24 Hours of Le Mans career
- Years: 1970–1976
- Teams: David Piper Autorace, Martini Racing Team, Ecurie Bonnier Switzerland, Gelo Racing Team
- Best finish: 1st (1971, 1976)
- Class wins: 3 (1971, 1975, 1976)

Jonkheer Gijsbert "Gijs" van Lennep (Dutch pronunciation: [ˈɣɛizbərt ˈxɛis fɑn ˈlɛnɛp]; born 16 March 1942) is a Dutch racing driver who competed in eight Formula One races. However, his main achievements were in sports car racing. He is a member of the untitled Dutch nobility.

== Career ==
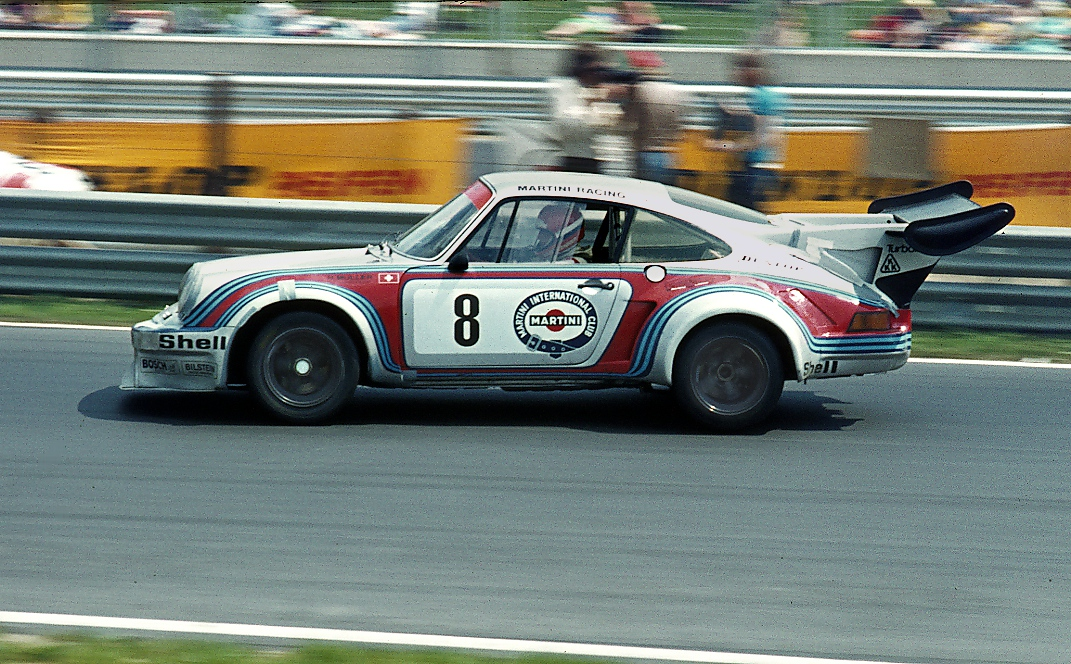
Gijs van Lennep in his Porsche Carrera RSR Turbo during the 1000 km of Nürburgring in 1974.

Van Lennep drove for the Porsche sportscar team beginning in 1967. He won the Porsche Cup, an annual award presented by Porsche AG to recognize the world's most successful privateer racing driver competing with Porsche machinery in a customer racing team, in 1970. He shared the number 22 Martini Racing Porsche 917K with Helmut Marko, winning the 24 Hours of Le Mans in 1971. They set a distance record, covering 5,335 km (3,315 mi), which remained unbeaten until 2010.

Also in 1971, the Stichting Autoraces Nederland (Foundation for Car races in the Netherlands) hired a Surtees TS7 for van Lennep to make his F1 debut in his home GP where he finished a creditable eighth in a very wet GP. The following year Van Lennep won the 1972 Rothmans European Formula 5000 Championship driving a Surtees TS11 and a McLaren M18. He also drove twice for the Williams GP team, earning his first World Championship point with sixth place in the 1973 Dutch Grand Prix. With Ensign, he scored a second point in the 1975 German Grand Prix, making him the fifth most successful Dutch Formula One driver behind Max Verstappen, Jos Verstappen, Carel Godin de Beaufort and Christijan Albers.

In 1973, van Lennep won the last Targa Florio, sharing the Martini Porsche Carrera RSR with Herbert Müller. He continued with sportscar racing, sharing a Porsche 936 Turbo with Jacky Ickx to win Le Mans 24 for a second time in 1976, before retiring from racing.

== Racing record ==
=== Complete 24 Hours of Le Mans results ===
Year	Team	Co-Drivers	Car	Class	Laps	Pos.	Class Pos.
1970	(Finland) A.A.W. Racing Team	(United Kingdom) David Piper	Porsche 917K	S 5.0	112	DNF	DNF
1971	(Germany) Martini International Racing Team	(Austria) Helmut Marko	Porsche 917K	S 5.0	397	**1st**	**1st**
1972	Ecurie Bonnier Switzerland	(Sweden) Jo Bonnier (France) Gérard Larrousse	Lola T280-Ford Cosworth	S 3.0	213	DNF	DNF
1973	(Germany) Martini Racing Team	(Switzerland) Herbert Müller	Porsche 911 Carrera RSR	S 3.0	328	4th	4th
1974	(Germany) Martini Racing Team	(Switzerland) Herbert Müller	Porsche 911 Carrera RSR Turbo	S 3.0	331	**2nd**	**2nd**
1975	(Germany) Gelo Racing Team	(United Kingdom) John Fitzpatrick (Liechtenstein) Manfred Schurti (Netherlands) Toine Hezemans	Porsche 911 Carrera RSR	GTS	315	5th	**1st**
1976	(Germany) Martini Racing Porsche System	(Belgium) Jacky Ickx	Porsche 936	S 3.0	349	**1st**	**1st**

=== Complete Formula One World Championship results ===
(key)

Year	Team	Chassis	Engine	1	2	3	4	5	6	7	8	9	10	11	12	13	14	15	WDC	Pts
1971	Stichting Autoraces Nederland	Surtees TS7	Ford Cosworth DFV 3.0 V8	RSA	ESP	MON	NED; 8	FRA	GBR	GER	AUT	ITA	CAN						NC	0
1971	Team Surtees	Surtees TS9	Ford Cosworth DFV 3.0 V8											USA; DNS					NC	0
1973	Frank Williams Racing Cars	Iso-Marlboro IR	Ford Cosworth DFV 3.0 V8	ARG	BRA	RSA	ESP	BEL	MON	SWE	FRA	GBR	NED; 6	GER	AUT; 9	ITA; Ret	CAN	USA	19th	1
1974	Frank Williams Racing Cars	Iso-Marlboro FW	Ford Cosworth DFV 3.0 V8	ARG	BRA	RSA	ESP	BEL; 14	MON	SWE	NED; DNQ	FRA	GBR	GER	AUT	ITA	CAN	USA	NC	0
1975	HB Bewaking Team Ensign	Ensign N174	Ford Cosworth DFV 3.0 V8	ARG	BRA	RSA	ESP	MON	BEL	SWE	NED; 10								19th	1
1975	HB Bewaking Team Ensign	Ensign N175	Ford Cosworth DFV 3.0 V8									FRA; 15	GBR	GER; 6	AUT	ITA	USA		19th	1

=== Complete Formula One Non-Championship results ===
(key)

Year	Team	Chassis	Engine	1	2	3	4	5	6
1972	Speed International	Surtees TS11 (F5000)	Chevrolet 5.0 V8	ROC; Ret	BRA	INT; 9	OUL; Ret	REP	VIC; Ret
1973	ShellSPORT Luxembourg	Lola T330 (F5000)	Chevrolet 5.0 V8	ROC; 12	INT; 7				

=== Complete European F5000 Championship results ===
(key) (Races in bold indicate pole position; races in italics indicate fastest lap.)

Year	Entrant	Chassis	Engine	1	2	3	4	5	6	7	8	9	10	11	12	13	14	15	16	17	Pos.	Pts
1972	Speed International Racing	Surtees TS11	Chevrolet 5.0 V8	BRH; 3	MAL	**SNE**; 1	BRH; 3	NIV; 5	SIL; 3	MON; 2	OUL; 7	MAL; 2	BRH; 2	SIL; 1	BRH; 2		BRH; 4				1st	65
1972	Speed International Racing	McLaren M18	Chevrolet 5.0 V8													OUL; 4					1st	65
1973	ShellSPORT Luxembourg	Lola T330	Chevrolet 5.0 V8	BRH; 6	MAL	SIL; 11	**SNE**; 2	**BRH**; 12	OUL	MAL; 7	MIS	MAL; 5	MON; 3	SIL; C	BRH; 9	OUL	JYL; 3	ZAN; Ret	SNE; DNS	BRH; 11	10th	59

== Sources ==
- Profile at www.grandprix.com

Sporting positions
Preceded by Hans Herrmann; Richard Attwood	Winner of the 24 Hours of Le Mans; 1971; With: Helmut Marko	Succeeded by Henri Pescarolo; Graham Hill
Preceded by Frank Gardner	European Formula 5000 Championship; Champion; 1972	Succeeded by Teddy Pilette
Preceded by Jacky Ickx; Derek Bell	Winner of the 24 Hours of Le Mans; 1976; With: Jacky Ickx	Succeeded by Jacky Ickx; Hurley Haywood; Jürgen Barth
