= Porsche 917 =

Race vehicle

Le mans

Midship

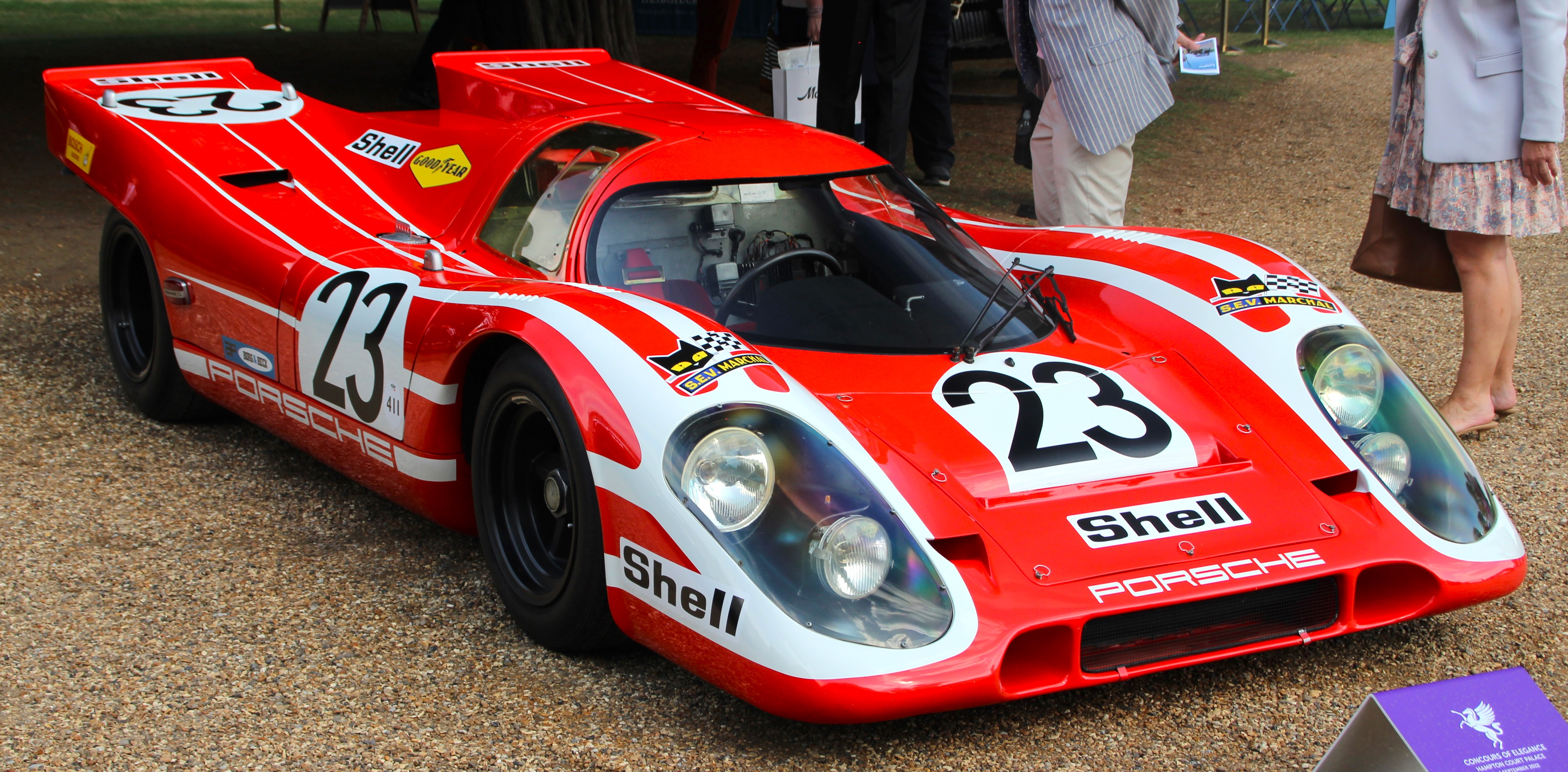
- The number 23 Porsche 917K in the famous red and white Salzburg livery was the winner of the 1970 24 Hours of Le Mans

Overview
- Manufacturer: Porsche AG
- Also called: Porsche 917 K; Porsche 917 PA; Porsche 917 L; Porsche 917 LH; Porsche 917 Interserie Spyder; Porsche 917/10; Porsche 917/20 ('The Pink Pig'); Porsche 917/30
- Production: 1969–1970 (917); 25 built 1970–1971 (917 K); 12 built
- Assembly: Stuttgart-Zuffenhausen, West Germany
- Designer: Helmuth Bott (chassis); Hans Mezger (engine)

Body and chassis
- Class: Group 4
- Body style: 2-door coupé
- Layout: Rear mid-engine, rear-wheel-drive
- Platform: Porsche 908
- Doors: Dihedral doors

Powertrain
- Engine: 4,494 cc (274.2 cu in) Type 912 Flat-12; 4,999 cc (305.1 cu in) Type 912 Flat-12; 5,374 cc (327.9 cu in) Type 912 Flat-12
- Transmission: 4-speed manual; 5-speed manual

Dimensions
- Wheelbase: 2,300 mm (90.6 in)
- Length: 4,780 mm (188.2 in) (917 L/LH); 4,120 mm (162.2 in) (917 K)
- Width: 2,033 mm (80.0 in)(917 L/LH); 1,980 mm (78.0 in) (917 K)
- Height: 920 mm (36.2 in)(917 L/LH); 940 mm (37.0 in) (917 K)
- Kerb weight: 820 kg (1,808 lb)(917 K)

Chronology
- Predecessor: Porsche 907
- Successor: Porsche 936

Porsche 917 40th Anniversary
Eleven 917s pull away at Goodwood Festival of Speed 2009

The Porsche 917 is a sports prototype race car developed by German manufacturer Porsche to exploit the regulations regarding the construction of 5-litre sports cars. Powered by a Type 912 flat-12 engine which was progressively enlarged from 4.5 to 5.0 litres, the 917 was introduced in 1969 and initially proved unwieldy on the race track but continuous development improved the handling and it went on to dominate sports-car racing in 1970 and 1971.

In 1970 it gave Porsche its first overall win at the 24 Hours of Le Mans, a feat it would repeat in 1971. It would be chiefly responsible for Porsche winning the International Championship for Makes in 1970 and 1971. Porsche went on to develop the 917 for Can–Am racing, culminating in the twin-turbocharged 917/30 which was even more dominant in the role. Porsche drivers would win the Can–Am championship in 1972 and 1973. 917 drivers also won the Interserie championship every year from 1969 to 1975.

== Origins of the 917 ==
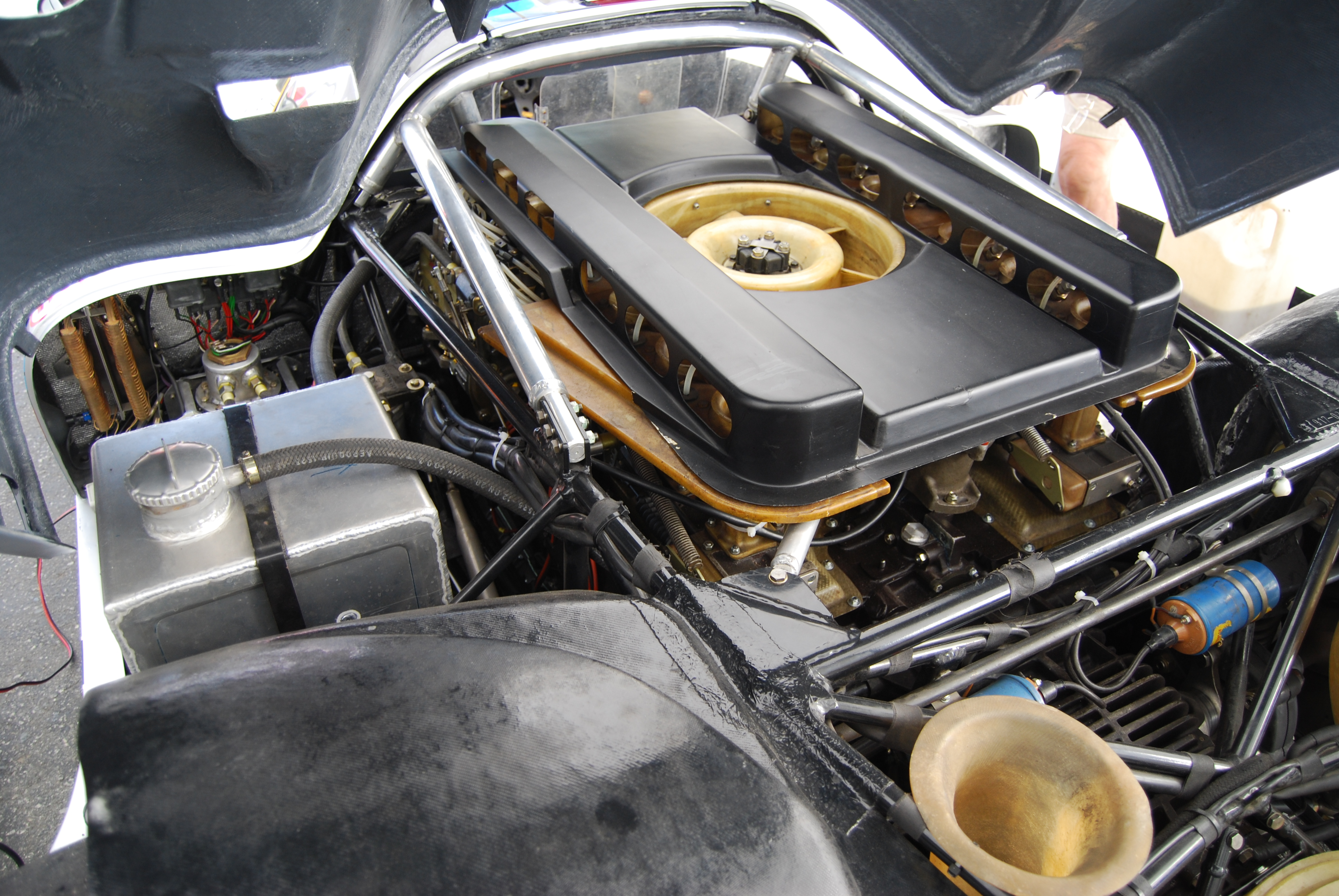
The type 912 Flat-12 engine

In an effort to reduce the speeds at Le Mans and other fast circuits of the unlimited capacity Group 6 prototypes (such as the seven-litre Ford GT40 Mk.IV and four-litre V12 Ferrari P) the Commission Sportive Internationale (then the independent competition arm of the FIA) announced that the International Championship of Makes would be run for three-litre Group 6 prototypes for four years from 1968 through 1971. This capacity reduction would also serve to entice manufacturers who were already building three-litre Formula One engines to adapt them for endurance racing.

Well aware that few manufacturers were ready to take up the challenge immediately, the CSI also allowed the participation of five-litre Group 4 sports cars, of which a minimum of 50 units had to be manufactured. This targeted existing cars like the aging Ford GT40 Mk.I and the newer Lola T70 coupé.

In April 1968, facing few entrants in races, the CSI announced that the minimum production figure to compete in the sport category of the International Championship of Makes (later the World Sportscar Championship) was reduced from 50 to 25, starting in 1969 through the planned end of the rules in 1971. With Ferrari absent in 1968, mainly Porsche 908s and Ford P68s were entered there, with the Ford being a total failure. As a result, old 2.2-litre Porsche 907s often won that category, with John Wyer's 4.7-litre Ford GT40 Mk.I taking wins at faster tracks.

Starting in July 1968, Porsche made a surprising and expensive effort to take advantage of this rule. As they were rebuilding race cars with new chassis every race or two anyway, selling the used cars to customers, they decided to conceive, design and build 25 versions of a whole new car with 4.5-litre for the sport category with one underlying goal: to win its first overall victory in the 24 Hours of Le Mans on June 14, 1970. In only ten months the Porsche 917 was developed, based on the Porsche 908.

When Porsche was first visited by the CSI inspectors only three cars were completed, while 18 were being assembled and seven additional sets of parts were present. Porsche argued that if they assembled the cars they would then have to take them apart again to prepare the cars for racing. The inspectors refused the homologation and asked to see 25 assembled and working cars.

On March 12, 1969, a 917 was displayed at the Geneva Motor Show, painted white with a green nose and a black No. 917. Brief literature on the car detailed a cash price of DM 140,000, approximately £16,000 at period exchange rates, or the price of about ten Porsche 911s. This price did not cover the costs of development.

On April 20 Porsche's head of motorsports Ferdinand Piëch displayed 25 917s parked in front of the Porsche factory to the CSI inspectors. Piëch even offered the opportunity to drive any of the cars, which was declined.

== Construction ==
The car's chassis was designed by Helmuth Bott and the engine was designed by Hans Mezger, both under the leadership of Ferdinand Piëch. The car was built around a very light spaceframe chassis (42 kg (93 lb)) which was permanently pressurised with gas to detect cracks in the welded structure. Power came from a new 4.5-litre air-cooled engine designed by Mezger. A completely new flat-12 block was designed without the cylinder offset needed by a boxer design to keep the engine compact. The 'Type 912' engine featured a 180° flat-12 cylinder layout with six crank throws (each conrod journal shared by opposing piston pair) as opposed to twelve on a boxer, twin overhead camshafts gear-driven from centrally mounted gears and twin spark plugs fed from two distributors. The large horizontally mounted cooling fan was also driven from centrally mounted gears. The longitudinally mounted type 920 gearbox was designed to take a set of four or five gears.

To keep the car compact despite the large engine, the driving position was so far forward that the feet of the driver were beyond the front wheel axle. The car had remarkable technology. It used many components made of titanium, magnesium and exotic alloys that had been developed for lightweight "Bergspyder" hill climb racers. Other methods of weight reduction were rather simple, such as making the gear shift knob out of birch wood, some methods were not simple, such as using the tubular frame itself as oil piping to the front oil cooler (a design used successfully by Lotus beginning with Lotus 22 of 1962). Bodywork made from Fiberglass saved further weight, though at the cost of safety in the event of an accident. This led to automotive writer James May nicknaming the 917 "the world’s fastest canoe."

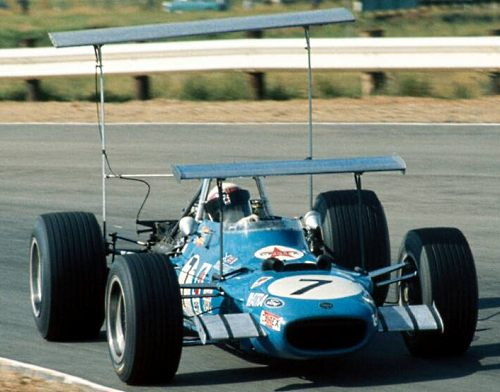
Jackie Stewart driving his Matra MS10 with the movable wing designs that was banned in May 1969, affecting also the 917

There are at least eleven variants of the 917. The original version had a removable long tail/medium tail with active rear wing flaps. These were banned in May 1969 after crashes in Formula 1. As a result the 917 had considerable handling problems at high speed because of significant rear lift. The handling problems were investigated in late 1969 at a joint test at the Österreichring by the factory engineers and their new race team partners JW Automotive. After exhaustive experimentation by both groups, and comparison to a CanAm 917 PA spyder, its shorter, more upswept tail was found to give the spyder more aerodynamic stability at speed. The changes were quickly adopted into the wedge-tail 917K, K for Kurzheck, or "short-tail".

In 1971, a variant of the 917K appeared with a less upswept tail and vertical fins, and featured the concave rear deck that had proved so effective on the 1970 version of the 917L. The fins kept the clean downforce-inducing air on the top of the tail and allowed the angle of the deck to be reduced, reducing the drag in direct proportion. The result was a more attractive looking car that maintained down force for less drag and higher top speed.

By this time the original 4.5-litre engine, which had produced around 520 bhp in 1969, had been enlarged through 4.9-litres (600 bhp) to 5-litres and produced a maximum of 630 bhp. The 917K models were generally used for the shorter road courses such as Sebring, Brands Hatch, Monza and Spa-Francorchamps. The big prize for Porsche however, was Le Mans. For the French circuit's long, high speed straights, the factory developed special long tail bodywork that was designed for minimum drag and thus highest maximum speed. On the car's debut in 1969, the 917L proved to be nearly uncontrollable as there was so little down force. In fact, they generated aerodynamic lift at the highest speeds. For 1970, an improved version was raced by the factory and for 1971, after very significant development in the wind tunnel, the definitive 917L was raced by both factory and JW.

In 1969 Jo Siffert raced an open-top 917PA Spyder (normally aspirated) in the 1969 CanAm series. There is also the "Pink Pig" aerodynamic research version (917/20), and the turbocharged 917/10 and 917/30 CanAm Spyders. Porsche 917s also raced in the European Interseries in various configurations. In the 1973 Can-Am series, the turbocharged version Porsche 917/30 developed 1,100 bhp (820 kW).

=== Variants ===
There were a number of versions of Porsche 917 made over the years; at least eleven different versions have existed.

1969 917:

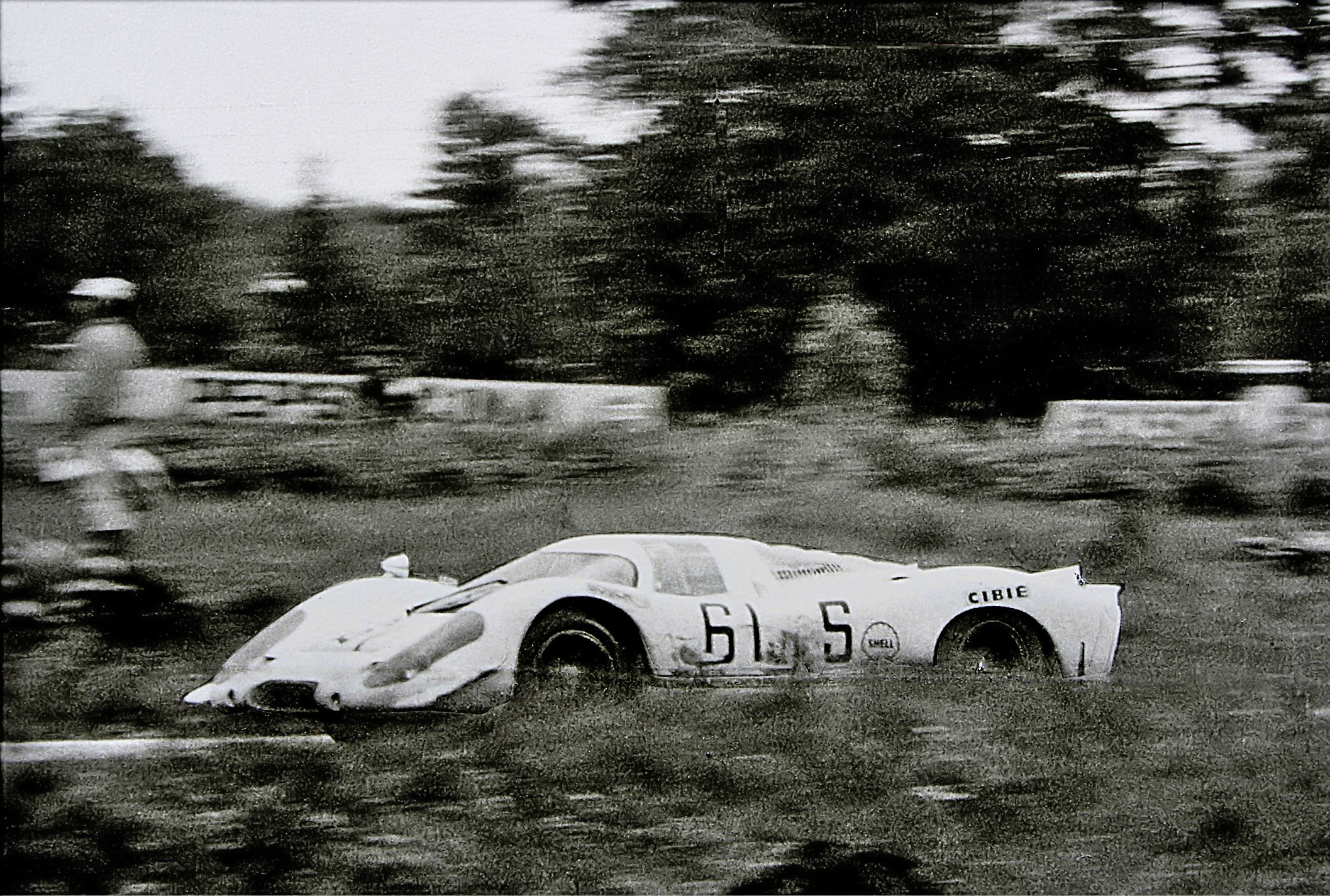
Original 1969 917 at the Nürburgring, with short tail

The original Porsche 917, barely assembled and not yet homologated, was first run at the 1969 24 Hours of Le Mans Test weekend at the end of March 1969. Right from the start it showed speed but considerable handling problems due to aerodynamic lift. The original specification of the car included two versions with detachable rear bodywork. The long-tail (Langheck), that was designed using experience from the previous 907 long-tail coupés for minimum aerodynamic drag. Like the shorter tail, it came with suspension controlled moving flaps on the tail.

Early in the 1969 Formula One season, large wings had been mounted on stilts on the front and rear suspensions of F1 cars, and could be adjusted with levers or pedals. The May 4 1969 Spanish Grand Prix was the last race of the high wing era in Formula One as both works Lotus 49 cars suffered massive accidents when their suspension-mounted wing supports failed. The CSI soon banned movable wings in motorsport, which affected the Le Mans race in June. It was only when Rolf Stommelen demonstrated how undriveable the 917 was without the moving flaps that they relented and allowed them for Le Mans only.

The 1969 World Sportscar Championship had four events before the homologation of the 917 as a Gr.4 sportscar became valid, starting in May 1969. The two overseas events were disappointing for Zuffenhausen, but the first two European round were decisive wins with the 908. Porsche swept the May 4 1969 Targa Florio 1-2-3-4 with new open-top Porsche 908/02 and did not bring a 917 to Sicily, but a week later to the 1000km Spa were the 917 had a less than impressive debut on a wet track. With the factory drivers preferring the long-tail 908L coupés, which basically had the same body as a 917L but due to less power not the same high speed problems, only one 917 started the race, replacing a 908L with blown engine. Next WC round was the 1000km Nürburgring where an armada of Porsche 908/02 finished 1-2-3-4-5. Neither factory driver wanted to drive the 917 on the twisty Ring, and that was continued in 1970 and 1971. Porsche needed to sell the 917 to privateers, and tried to hire BMW factory drivers to showcase the 917, but Munich declined. British drivers steered the lone short-tail 917 to an 8th place finish, and John Woolfe ordered one.

With five consecutive wins, Porsche had secured the World Sportscar Championship, but not yet the all-important Le Mans 24h. Two 917L and three 908L were the fastest cars in the race until the 22th hour when the gearboxes of the leading flat-12 and flat-8 cars failed, handing the race again to the JWA-Ford that had won in 1968. Porsche did not enter the remaining two races as a factory, and did not bother to ferry any 917 to the 6 Hours of Watkins Glen in July, where three "private" 908/02 swept the podium. The same weekend, 908/02s driven by Jo Siffert, Brian Redman and Tony Dean also entered the Round 3 of the 1969 Can-Am season, finishing 6th and 9th due to severe lack of power. Dean managed to win the 1970 Road Atlanta Can-Am with his 908/02, though.

The speed of the original 917 may have been countered by the handling and reliability problems, but two chassis intended for potential customers were entered in the inaugural Zeltweg 1000 km race, driven by the factory regulars. Finally, a 917 won a WC race, finishing 1-3, the Freiherr von Wendt and David Piper cars split by a Lola T70. Also, the 917 finally outpaced its 908 siblings.

Following the August race on the fast Österreichring, JW Automotive, who would be acting as a semi-works team in 1970, requested a October test session with Porsche to try and sort out the car's problems. The open top 917PA built to Group 7 rules with its wedge tail was much faster than the coupé that had been homologated in Group 4, thus modifications were limited and had to be approved by FIA/CSI. As a result, the original bodywork was retired, and Leo Kinnunen was hired after Ickx signed with Ferrari. With the new 917K bodywork and other improvements, like the side exhausts and the engine cover being removed, another test was conducted in November at Daytona where Porsche had failed in 1969.

1969 917PA:

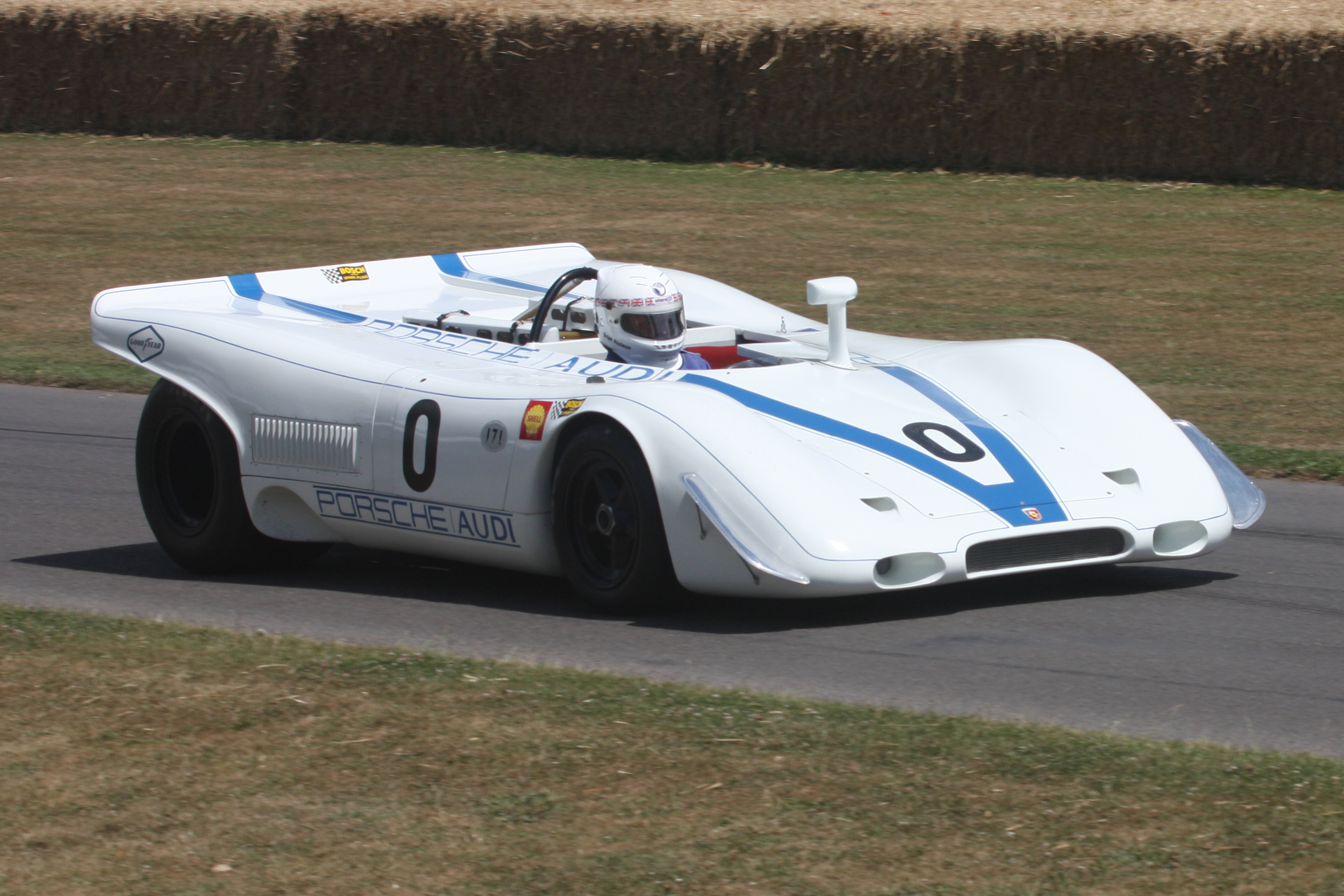
Porsche 917-PA

The 917PA was, similar to the 908/02 body style, an open-topped and short-tailed version of the original 917, built to compete in the latter part of the 1969 Can-Am season. It was driven by Jo Siffert, starting with round 5 in late August, a week after the WSC season had ended in Zeltweg with a win by the 917 Coupé driven by Siffert. Back in Europe, again in Zeltweg, it was used in the October test session with the Wyer team.

Only two cars were built by Porsche. The first never raced, and later became a test mule for an experimental flat-16 engine. The second car was entered in Can-Am by Porsche Audi, the North American distributors for Porsche and Audi (hence the PA designation). Compared to the dominant McLarens and other cars powered by big US V8 engines, the car was underpowered and overweight. Siffert's best result was 3rd at Bridgehampton, backed up by three 4th places. Despite missing three of the early events, he finished 4th in the championship. In the 1970 Can-Am season, in the joint event at Watkins Glen, the 917K were used to challenge the challengers.

For 1971 the PA car was obtained by Vasek Polak who ran it for the next three years with the car gaining ever more aerodynamic aids, until by 1973 it resembled the 917/10 variant.

The design of the 917PA's gently upswept tail was one of the contributors to the search for better handling of the 917 coupés, resulting in the 917K variant.

=== 1970 917K ===
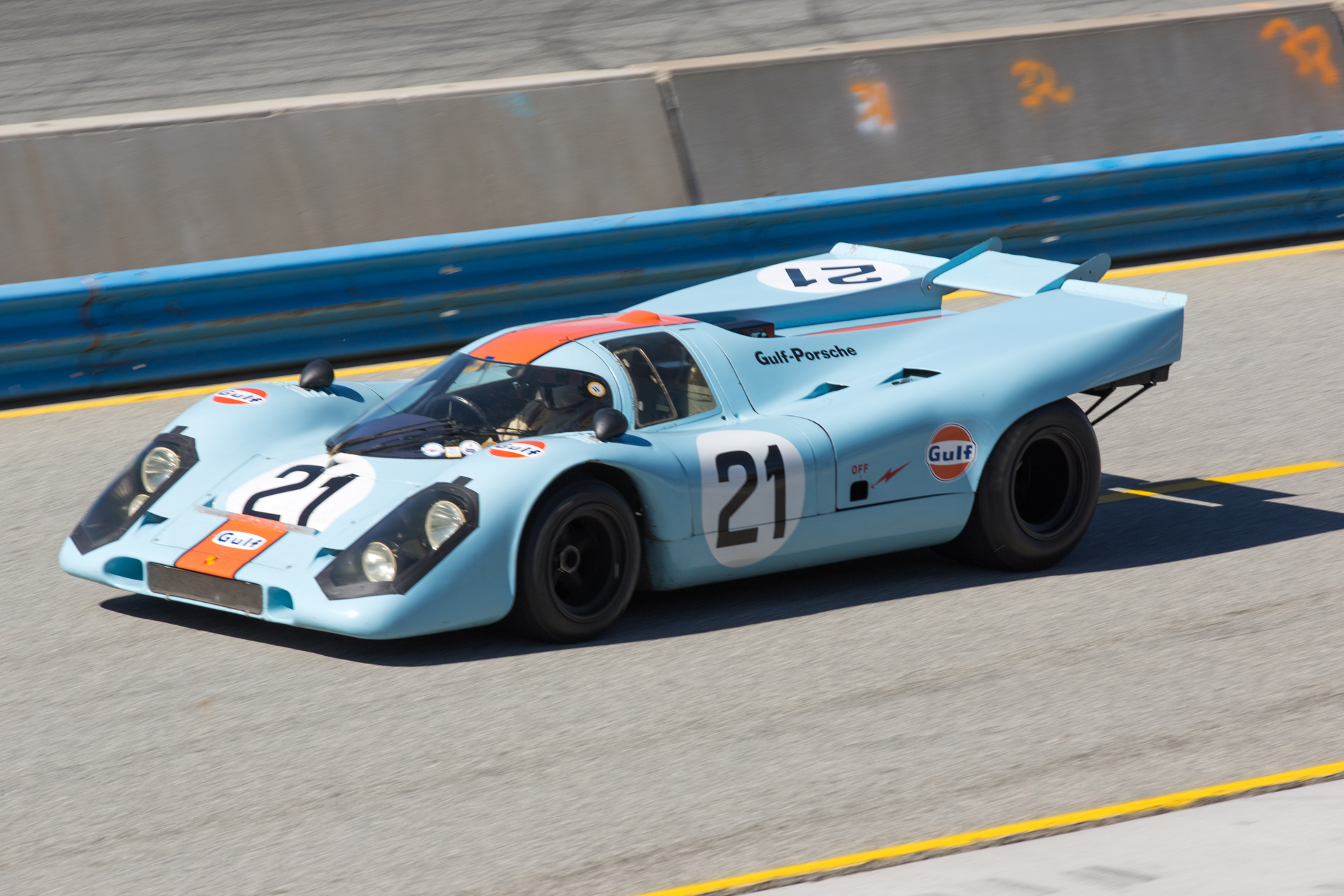
917K (1970)

The 917K was an evolution of the original 1969 car. After the first 917s were run in 1969, it was clear the car's aerodynamics made it nearly undriveable at higher speeds. After the 1969 championship season had finished, John Wyer requested a 3-day test session at the Austrian Österreichring course. The Porsche technical team turned out ready to do some serious panel work on the coupé and in order to make a comparison, brought along Siffert's Can-Am 917PA Spyder. The drivers present instantly preferred the PA and together, the JW Automotive and Porsche engineers came up with the idea of a more upswept tail (as on the 917PA). The JW team had had similar high speed handling problems with the early Ford GT40 models. With gaffer tape and aluminium sheet, a completely new short tail was evolved at the racetrack. This was quickly converted into a 'production' design back at Porsche. After testing in Daytona, the 917K (Kurzheck) made its public debut at the season opening January 1970 24 Hours of Daytona where it faced the new Ferrari 512S. Such was the improvement in the stability of the car at high speed, the 917K became the standard configuration for all races except Le Mans, the Nürburgring 1000 km and the Targa Florio. This car was raced at every event by JW Automotive and Porsche Salzburg in the 1970 season except the Targa Florio and the Nürburgring 1000 km. The smaller, more nimble and generally better suited 908/03s were used for those races, but privateers used the 917K at the Nürburgring 1000 km, and Vic Elford drove a lap of the 44-mile Targa Florio course in a Salzburg 917K at Ferdinand Piëch's request. Later on in the 1970 season, the 4.5 litre flat-12 was bored out to 4.9 litres, then 5 litres. The 917K in 1970 won 7 out of 10 championship races, thus not all the races it competed in. It was beaten twice by the factory's decision to enter 908/03, and at Sebring by a Ferrari 512S. Non-championships races in Paris and Kyalami were won by Matra and Ferrari 512M over private 917K.

=== 1970 917L ===
Porsche, being an underdog with small engines, had entered low drag long tail versions at Le Mans for several years. This was continued also when entering the biggest categories with the 908 and the 917 as the air-cooled 2-valve engines had less power than modern water-cooled 4-valve designs. Despite the 917K being successful, another long tail, low drag version of the 1969 917L body was purpose-built for the 1970 24 Hours of Le Mans. Even after the Ford chicane had been added, Le Mans in 1970 was almost entirely made up of long straights, and this L version was designed to maximise the speed capability resulting from the increased power developed by the flat-12 engine over the previous Porsche types. The 1970 917L was largely based on the initial 1969 car. Nevertheless, factory driver Vic Elford, assign to Salzburg rather than JWA, had found the car's ultimate speed an advantage enough over its still questionable handling in the braking and cornering sections of Le Mans. It was 25 mph faster down the straights than the 917K and the Ferrari 512Ss. With JWA not interested, only two were entered in the 1970 Le Mans race (along with 5 917Ks), a white one by Porsche Salzburg, and the blue hippie car by Martini Racing. The Porsche Salzburg 917L was qualified in pole position by Elford, but retired with engine failure after 18 hours. The Martini 917L of Kauhsen/Larrousse finished 2nd, five laps behind the winning Salzburg 917K of Hans Herrmann and Richard Attwood.

=== 1971 917 16 Cylinder ===
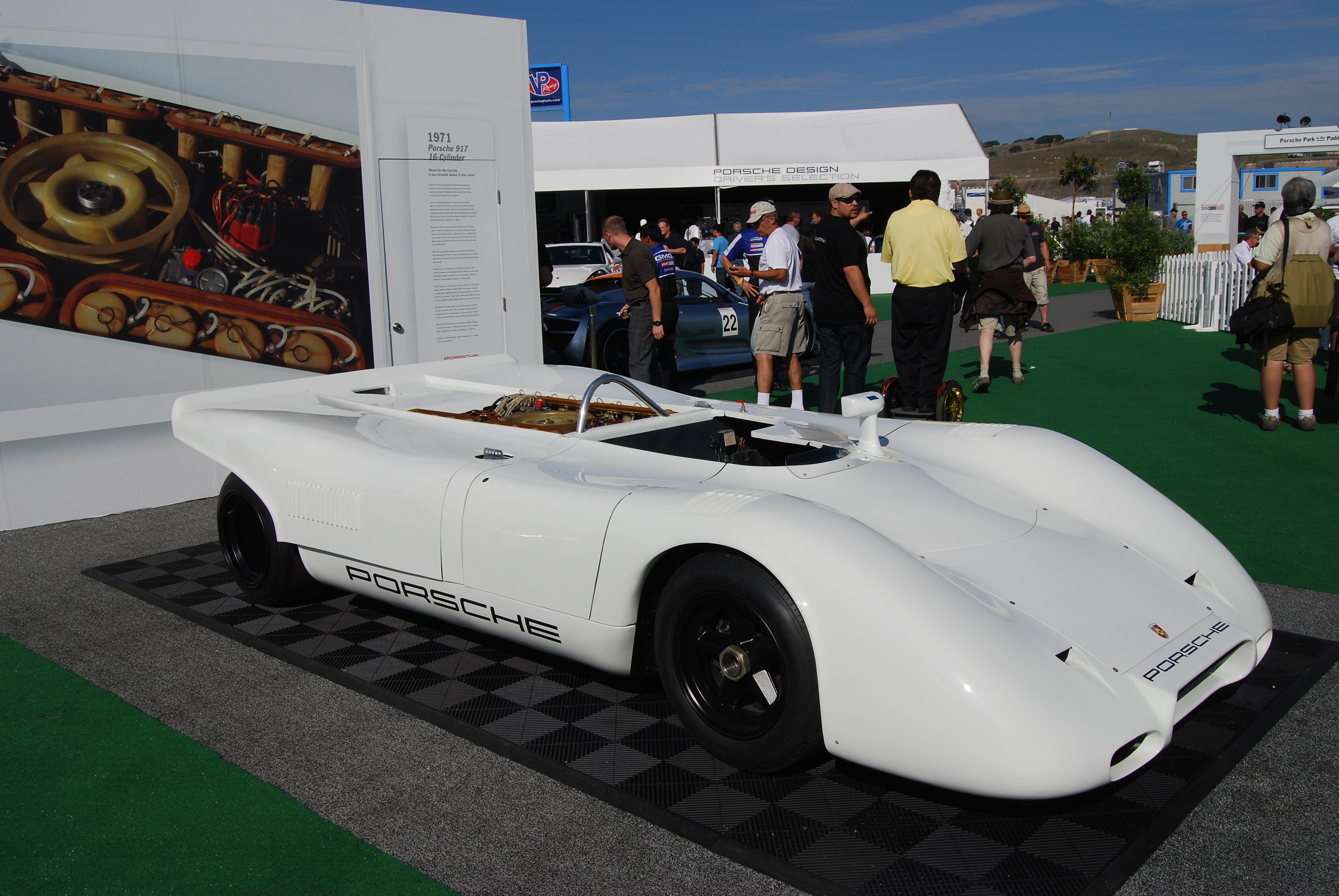
917 16 Cylinder (1971)

In an effort to keep up with other more powerful cars in the Can-Am championship, a 6.6 litre, 750PS (551 kW, 739 bhp) flat-16 engined prototype was developed based on the 5-litre. It was tested in the original 917PA chassis, with the wheelbase extended by 270mm to take the longer engine, basically an added flat-4. Although more powerful than the flat-12, it was also 80 kg heavier, and still less powerful by big US V8 engines of the time. Porsche decided that turbocharging the flat-12 would be more profitable, and the flat-16 was shelved. Ferdinand Piech's grandfather, Ferdinand Porsche, had designed the 1930s Auto Union racing cars with a supercharged V16 that eventually was bored out to 6 litre. Piech later got a turbocharged 16-cylinder of his own with the Bugatti Veyron.

=== 1971 917K ===
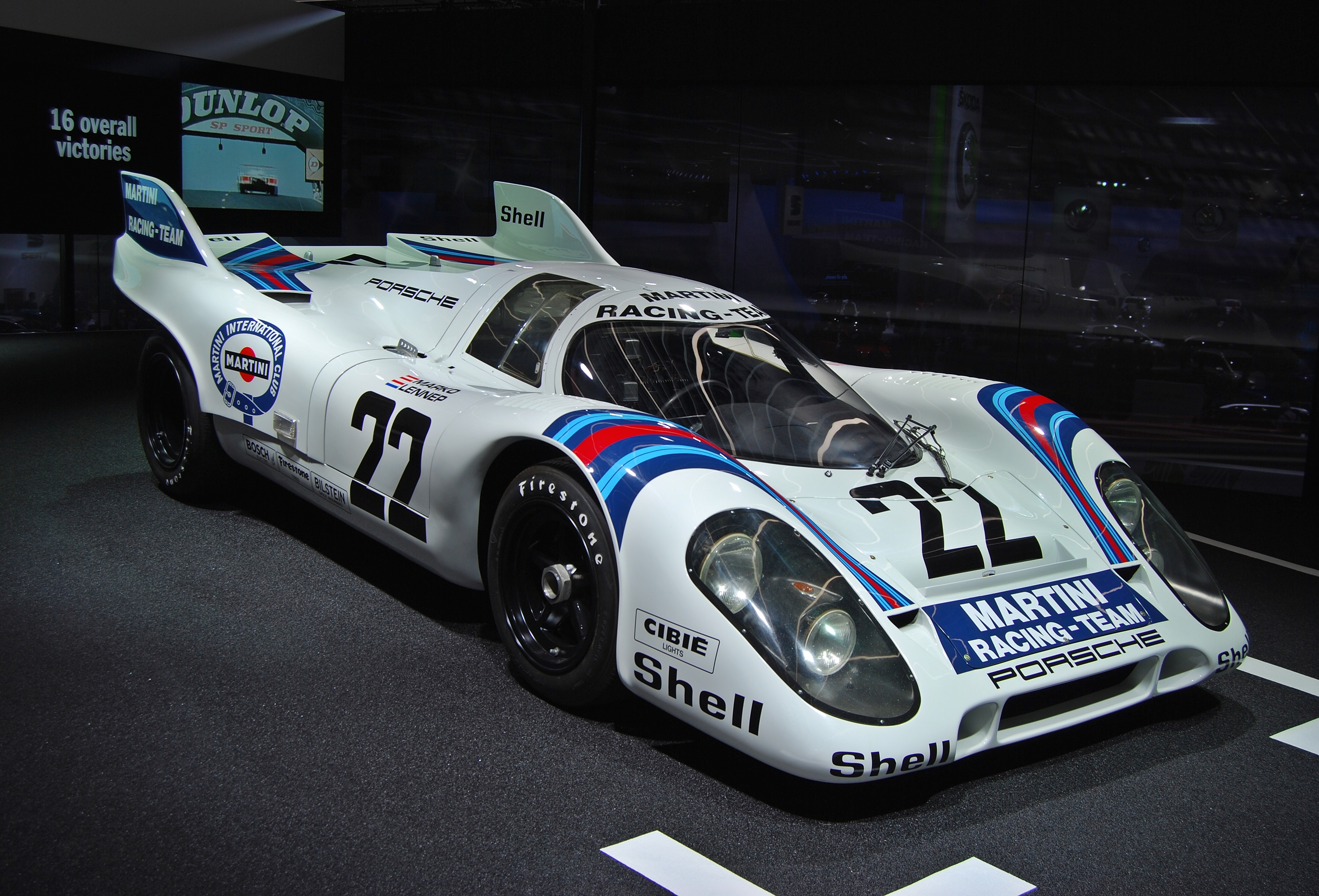
917K (1971)

The 917K was further developed for the 1971 season, and the car had vertical fins and two airboxes on the tail section for better aerodynamics and cooling. The fins retained the airflow over the rear part of the bodywork, allowing the deck height to be reduced for a given level of downforce. As a result, the 'finned' 1971 917Ks were faster than the 1970 versions and proved nearly as successful, winning seven of the eleven WSC races, as the factory once again entered 908/03 twice, and the 3 litre Alfa T33 won two races, too. A version of this model with a lightweight magnesium chassis won the 1971 24 Hours of Le Mans.

1971 917LH:

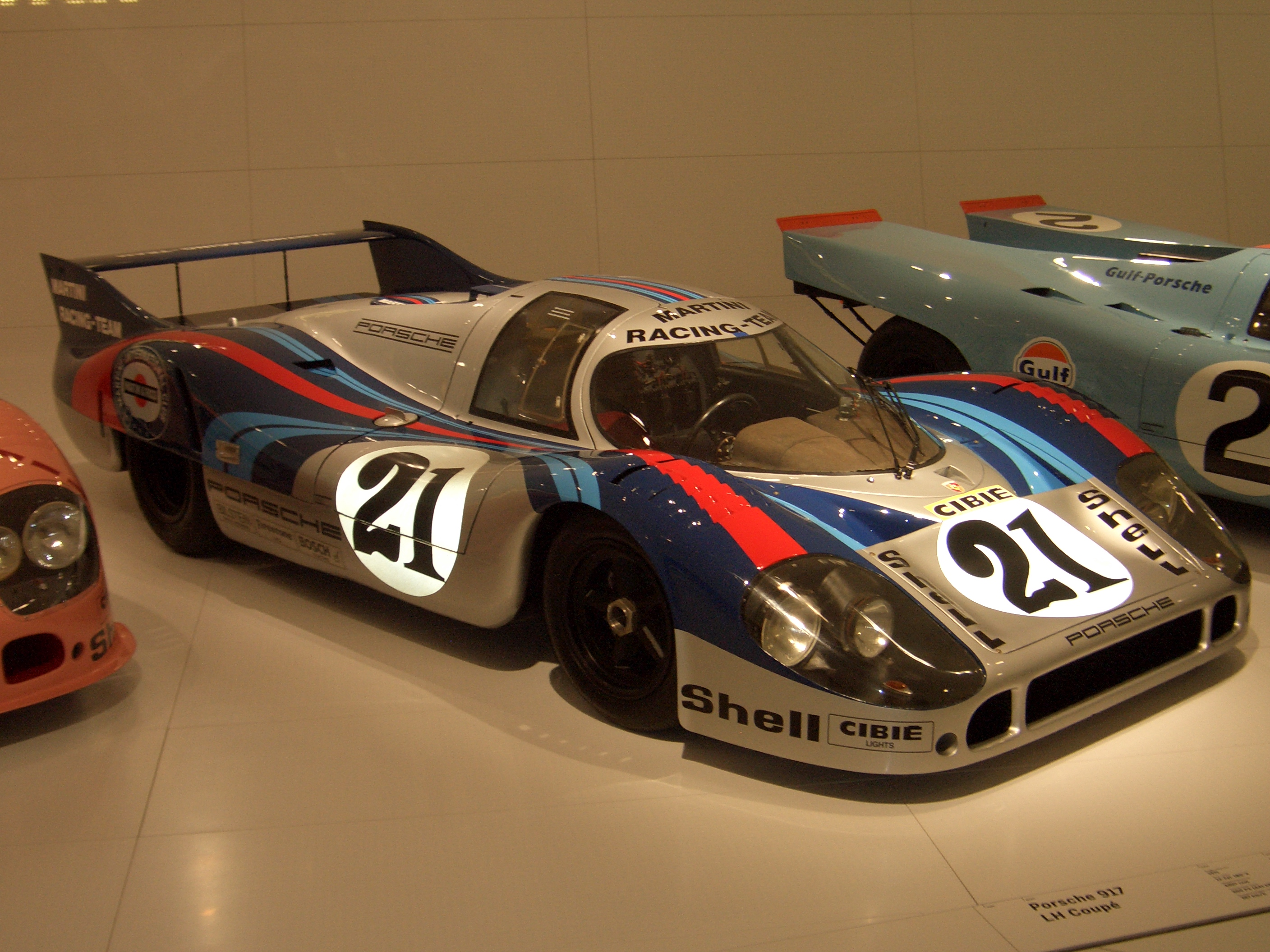
917LH

The 1971 model was a further development of the 1970 917L and was also made specifically to compete in only one race: the 1971 24 Hours of Le Mans. The car was also more stable than its 1970 predecessor because of a revised suspension set up and new bodywork with partially enclosed rear wheel covers and a redesigned front section. This time, two were run by JW Automotive, and one again by the Martini International team, now a second factory team continuing the Salzburg effort. Both teams also entered a 917K, and it were the 917K of Martini and JWA that finished 1-2, beating two Ferrari 512M.

Although Jackie Oliver qualified one of the JW 917LHs on pole position, none of the three cars finished the race. Despite setting fastest laps both in practises and races from 1969 to 1971 at the hands of Stommelen, Elford and Oliver, the LH and L cars never won, with the 2nd place in 1970 being the only finish.

1971 917 Interserie Spyder: Three Porsche 917 Spyders were built for use in the German Interserie championship, rebuilt from 917s that had been crashed or otherwise written off. These cars were very successful, winning the 1971 Interserie championship.

1971 917/10:

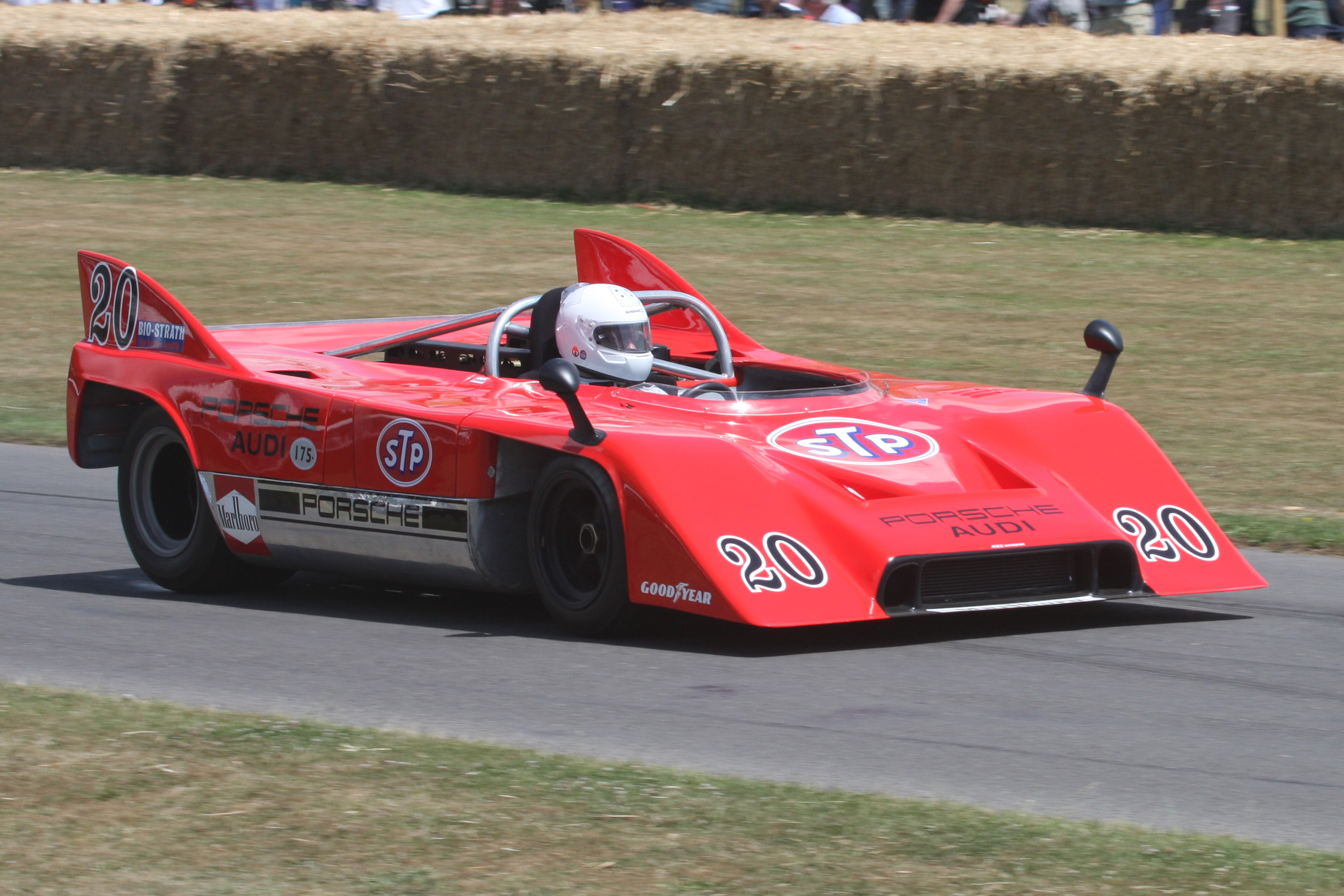
Porsche 917/10

The 917/10 was built for Can-Am racing, with a 5 litre engine, new bodywork and weight pared to a minimum. It was run in the latter part of the 1971 Can-Am season by Jo Siffert, with moderately successful results.

1971 917/20:

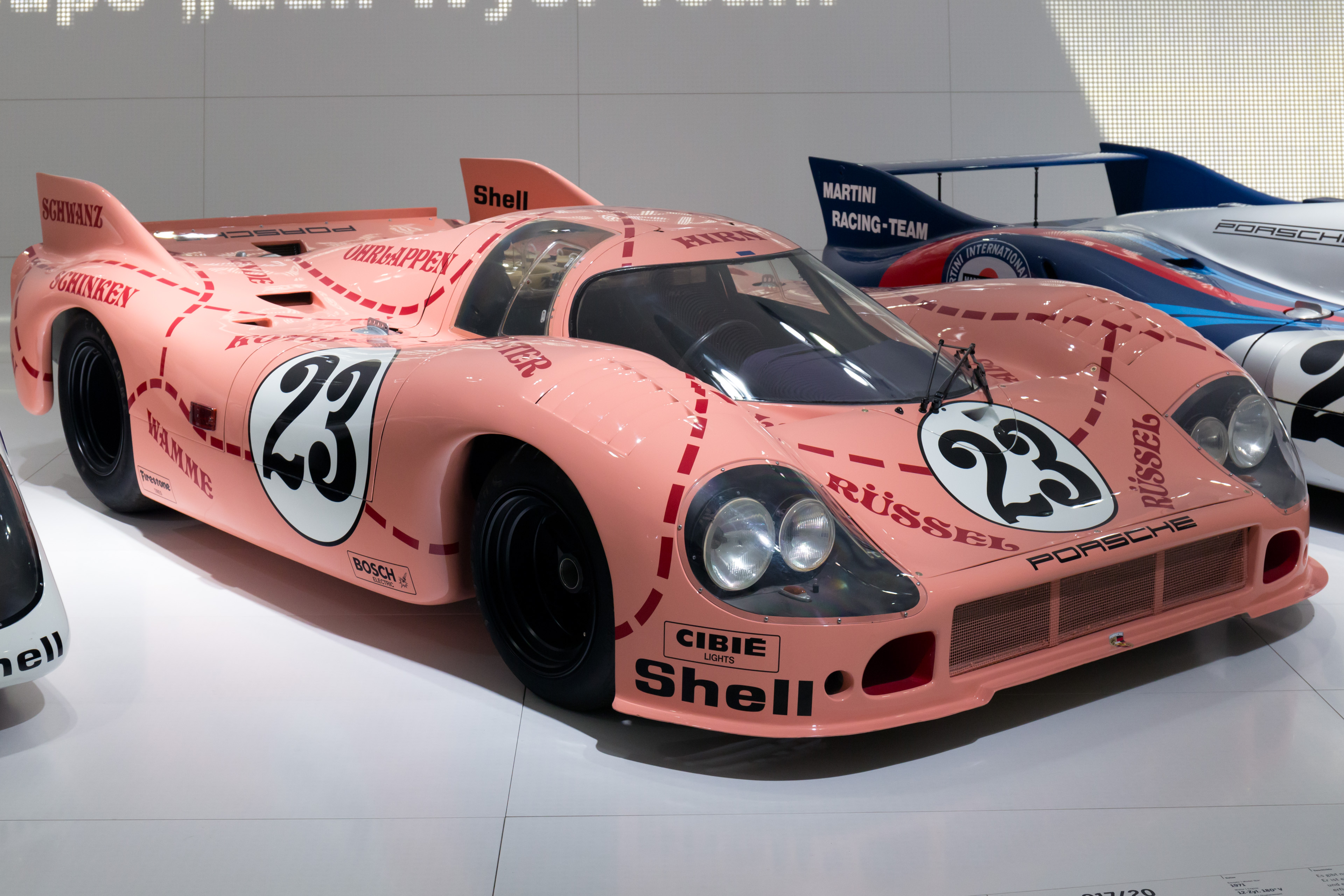
Porsche 917/20 "Pink Pig"

The 917/20 was a one-off experimental R&D car. It was made as an intermediate car to combine the low drag of the Langheck and the stability of the Kurz, and was also a test-bed for future Can-Am parts and aerodynamic low-drag concepts. It was only raced once, at the 1971 24 Hours of Le Mans where it was entered by the Martini International team and driven by Reinhold Joest and Willi Kauhsen. Known as the "Pink Pig" for its broad proportions, it was given a pink livery with names of meat cuts running over the bodywork. Although it qualified seventh and ran as high as third, it retired from the race after an accident caused by brake failure at Arnage while Joest was driving.

1972 917/10:

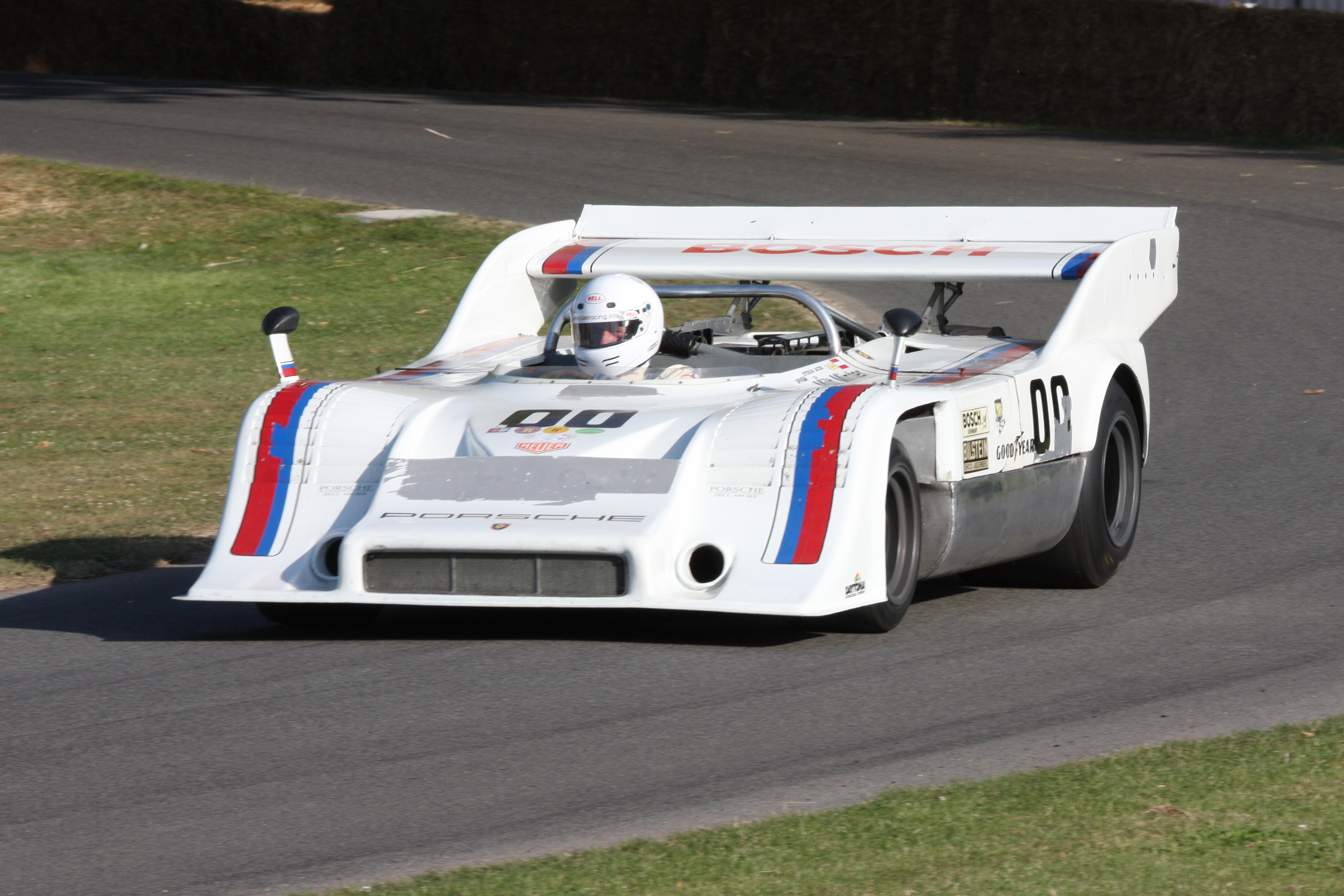
917/10 (1972)

The revised 917/10 was Porsche's first full-scale attempt at Can-Am for 1972. This car ran the 5.0 litre flat-12 and was modified to accommodate additional compression; two turbochargers were added to give the car tremendous horsepower. George Follmer won the championship in the Roger Penske car.

1973 917/30:

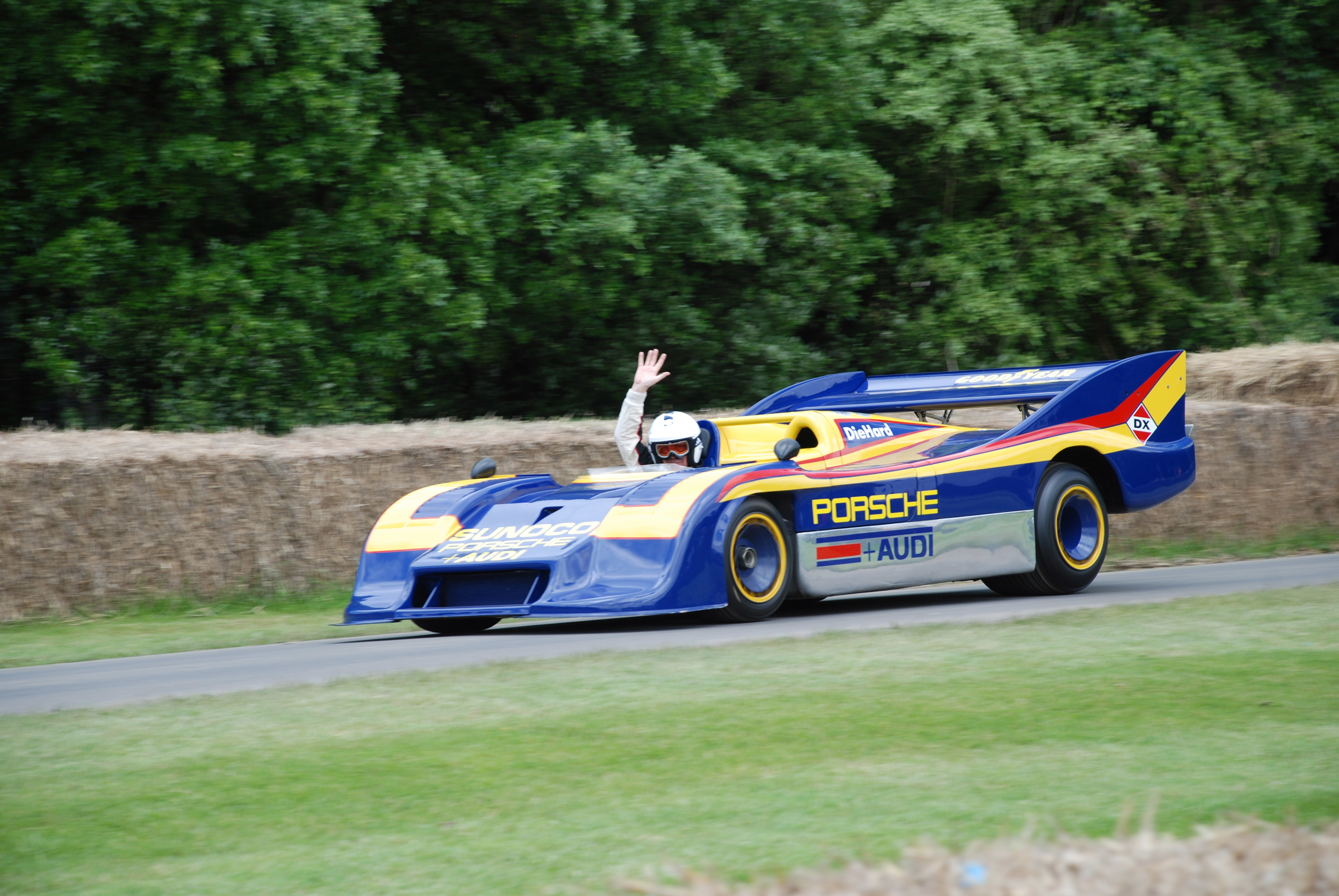
Porsche 917/30

The 917/30, the final official iteration of the 917, is one of the most powerful sports racing cars to have ever existed. The car had all new bodywork, and the twin turbocharged engine was bored out to 5.4 litres giving it 1100–1580 horsepower, depending on the state of tune. These cars dominated Can-Am racing to such an extent that the series lost popularity in the United States. A total of six chassis were built.

== Racing history ==
=== 1969–1971 World Sportscar Championship ===
==== 1969 ====
In testing, it soon appeared that the Porsche 917 did not work well on the race track. Porsche factory driver Brian Redman recalled that "it was incredibly unstable, using all the road at speed." Many thought that the 4.5-litre engine was too much for the frame. The suspension and the stability of the frame were suspected, but modifications did not improve the problem. It was finally determined that the "long tail" body was generating significant lift on the straights, as the 917 was 30 km/h (19 mph) faster than anything previously built for Le Mans. As with former under-powered Porsches, the 917 aerodynamics had been optimized for low drag in order to do well on the fast straights of Le Mans, Spa, Monza and elsewhere. The significance of downforce for racing was not yet fully realised although Can-Am and F1 cars were using wings by that time.

Before its competition debut on 11 May 1969 in the 1000km Spa, the weather conditions prevented further improvements in tests. The Jo Siffert/Brian Redman car managed to clock an unofficial lap time of 3:41.9 which would have beaten the pole of 3:42.5 set by a Lola, but they chose to use the 908LH long tail with which they won the race and set the fastest lap at 3:37.1. Gerhard Mitter/Udo Schütz actually started the race from 8th, but their already ailing engine failed after one lap.

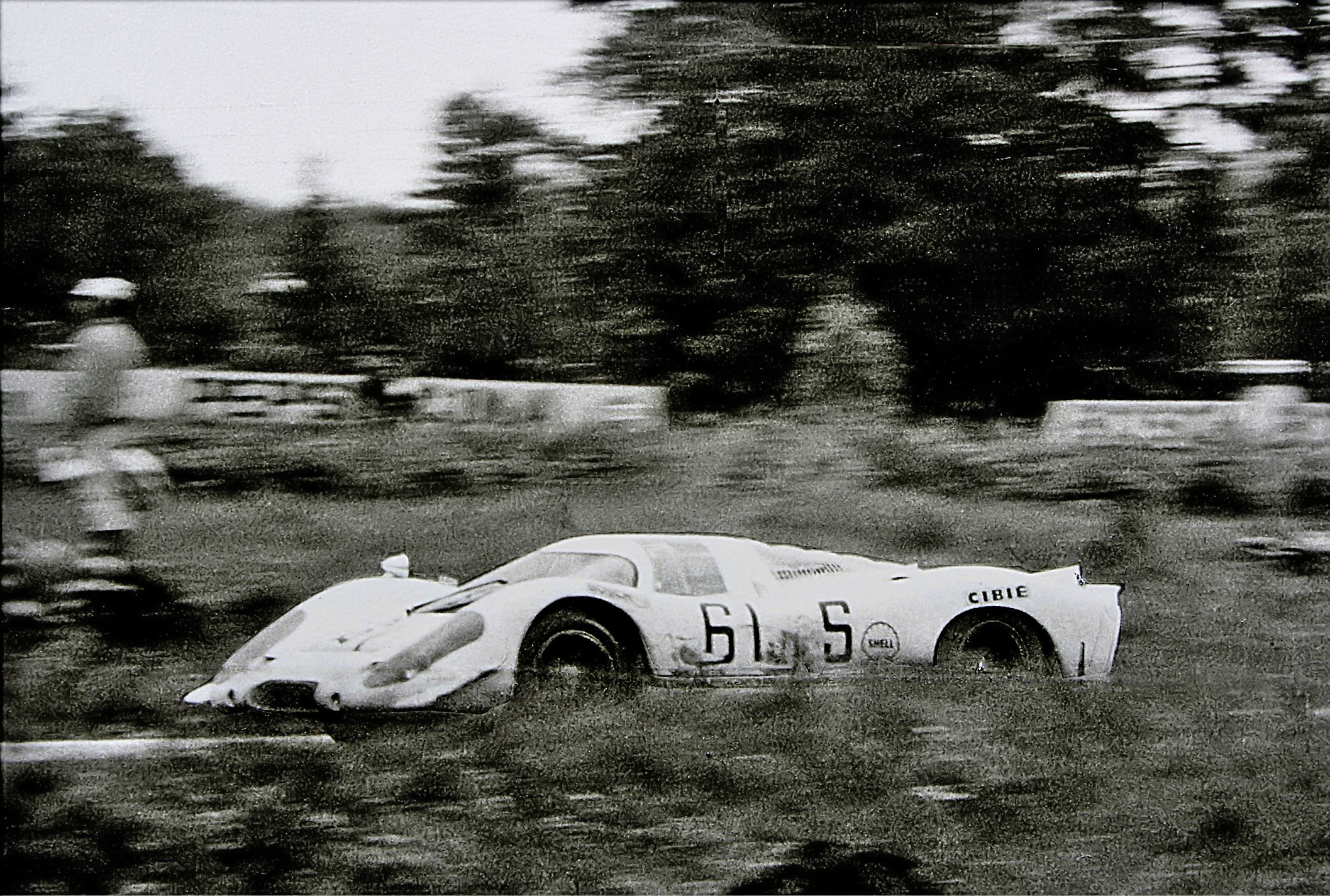
Porsche 917 in 1000 km Race at the Nürburgring 1969

Three weeks later for the 1000km Nürburgring, all works drivers preferred the 908 over the 917 which was, despite some modifications, not suited for the twisty track. As it was necessary to promote the car in order to sell the surplus ones, Porsche asked BMW for the services of their factory drivers Hubert Hahne and Dieter Quester. They practised, but Munich declined permission to have them race, so Englishman David Piper and Australian Frank Gardner were hired on short terms. They drove the 917 to an eighth-place finish behind a Ford and an Alfa, while the factory's armada of six 908/02 spyders scored a 1-2-3-4-5 win after the only serious competition, a sole Ferrari 312P, failed.

At the 1969 24 Hours of Le Mans, the 917s were quickest in practice. Soon after the start the poor handling of the 917 and the inexperience of one of the drivers resulted in drama: British gentleman-driver John Woolfe crashed his Porsche 917 at Maison Blanche on lap 1, dying as a result. Woolfe was the first privateer to race a 917. The works #14 917 led early, but succumbed to an oil leak, while the #12 dropped out of the lead and the race in the 21st hour with a broken gearbox, despite leading by nearly 50 miles. At the end, Hans Herrmann's 908 remained as the only Porsche that could challenge for the win, but Jacky Ickx's more powerful Ford won once again, by a mere 120 m (390 ft).

In June 1969, Enzo Ferrari sold half of his stock to FIAT, and used some of that money to build 25 cars powered by a 5-litre V12 in order to compete with the Porsche 917: the Ferrari 512 would be introduced for the 1970 season.

At that time, the 917 already had several races under its belt, yet no success. The first win came in the last race of the championship season, the 1000 km Zeltweg. Jo Siffert and Kurt Ahrens succeeded in the privately entered Porsche 917 of German Freiherr von Wendt. At that time, the factory had started to focus on development, leaving the time-consuming trips to races to customer teams.

==== 1970 ====
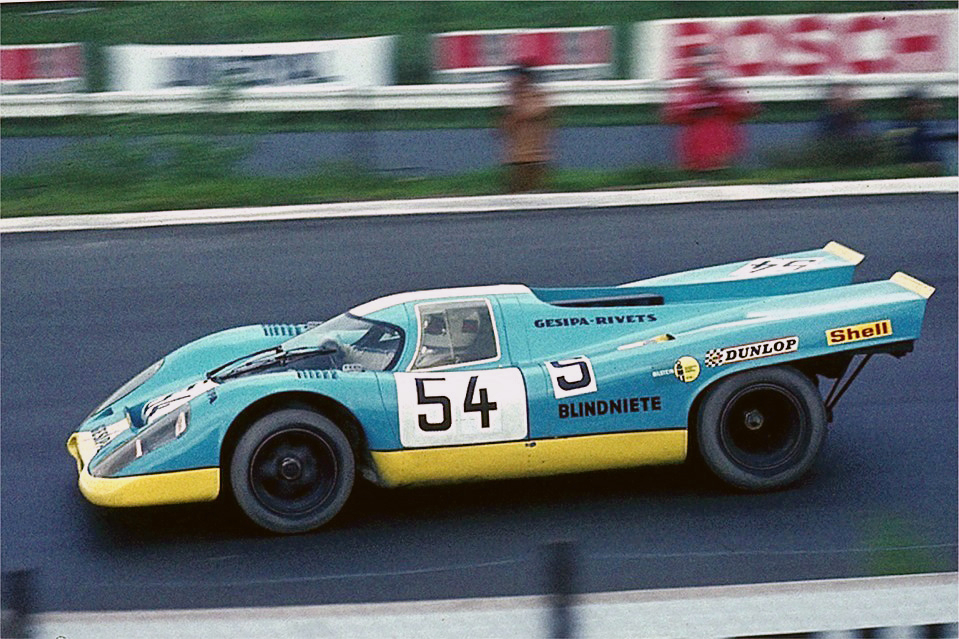
Porsche 917 K at the Nürburgring

Disappointed by the poor results of the 917 in 1969, and facing new competition, Porsche concluded an agreement with John Wyer and his JWA Gulf Team, which became the official Porsche team, and also the official development partner. During tests at the Österreichring at Zeltweg, works drivers Redman and Ahrens tested the car, and the car still performed like it did before. The Österreichring was the circuit where the car had won its only race at that time, Wyer's chief engineer John Horsman noticed that the bodywork had a pattern of dead gnats dashed against it, revealing the airflow. The tail was clean—the lack of dead gnats indicated that the air was not flowing over the tail. A modification to the tail was cobbled-up on the spot in the pits with aluminium sheets taped together. This new short tail gave the 917 much needed downforce. The plastic engine intake cover had already been removed. Redman and Ahrens were doing only one lap at a time before, they each did 10 laps and were satisfied with the improved performance. The new version was called 917K (Kurzheck, or "short tail").

In addition to the heavier and powerful 917, the lightweight and compact Porsche 908/3 were developed for the slow and twisty tracks of the Nürburgring and the Sicilian mountain roads used in the Targa Florio, providing wins while the factory-backed 917 remained in the garages, as these cars were not suitable for these tracks. The 908/3 was built to the FIA's 3-litre Group 6 Prototype regulations whereas the 917 was now officially a Group 5 Sports Car following another FIA review of its racing classes, applicable from 1970.

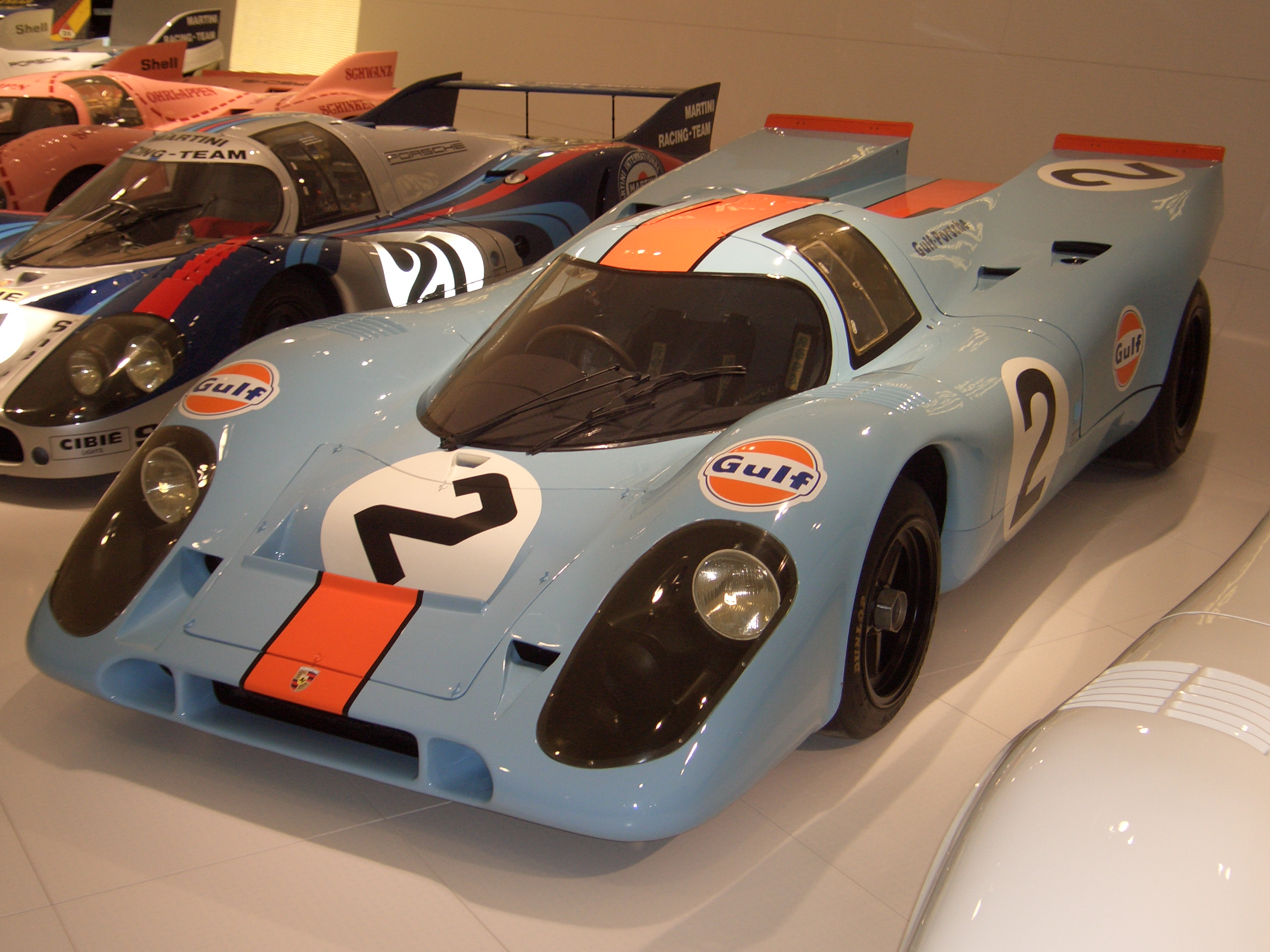
Porsche 917 World Sportscar Championship 1970 and 1971 driven by Pedro Rodríguez

Wyer was surprised to discover that another team was carefully preparing for the 1970 24 Hours of Le Mans with close support from Porsche. As in 1969, the Porsche Salzburg team was a de facto works team under control of members of the Porsche family. The Martini Racing team also gained support from Porsche AG; obviously Porsche made efforts to win the race by supporting more than one team.

Also, a new low drag version of the 917 was developed for Le Mans with support from the external consultant Robert Choulet. The 917LH (Langheck) featured a spectacular new long tail body which had very low drag, yet more rear downforce than the 1969 long tail. A 4.9-litre engine, introduced at 1000km Monza, was available but these proved to be unreliable for longer distance races.

The 917 did not compete at all the races of the season, however. Porsche's previous competition model, the 908, was redesigned with an all-new chassis and designated 908/03 so it would be used at the Targa Florio and Nurburgring 1000 km events- two twisty, narrow and slow tracks the 917 was not competitive at. Vic Elford drove a 917 during practice for the 1970 Targa Florio and it proved to be so physically demanding and difficult to drive around the circuit that he had to be lifted out of the car, although he set the 5th fastest time. The 908/03 was very effective at these two races. Porsche's dedication was such that they were building cars for each type of track- the 908/03 for the slow, twisty tracks, the 917K for the medium and high-speed tracks, and the 917L for the fast straights of Le Mans.

The favourite team to win, Gulf-backed JW Automotive, lined up three 917Ks, two with the 4.9-litre engine and one with the 4.5-litre unit.

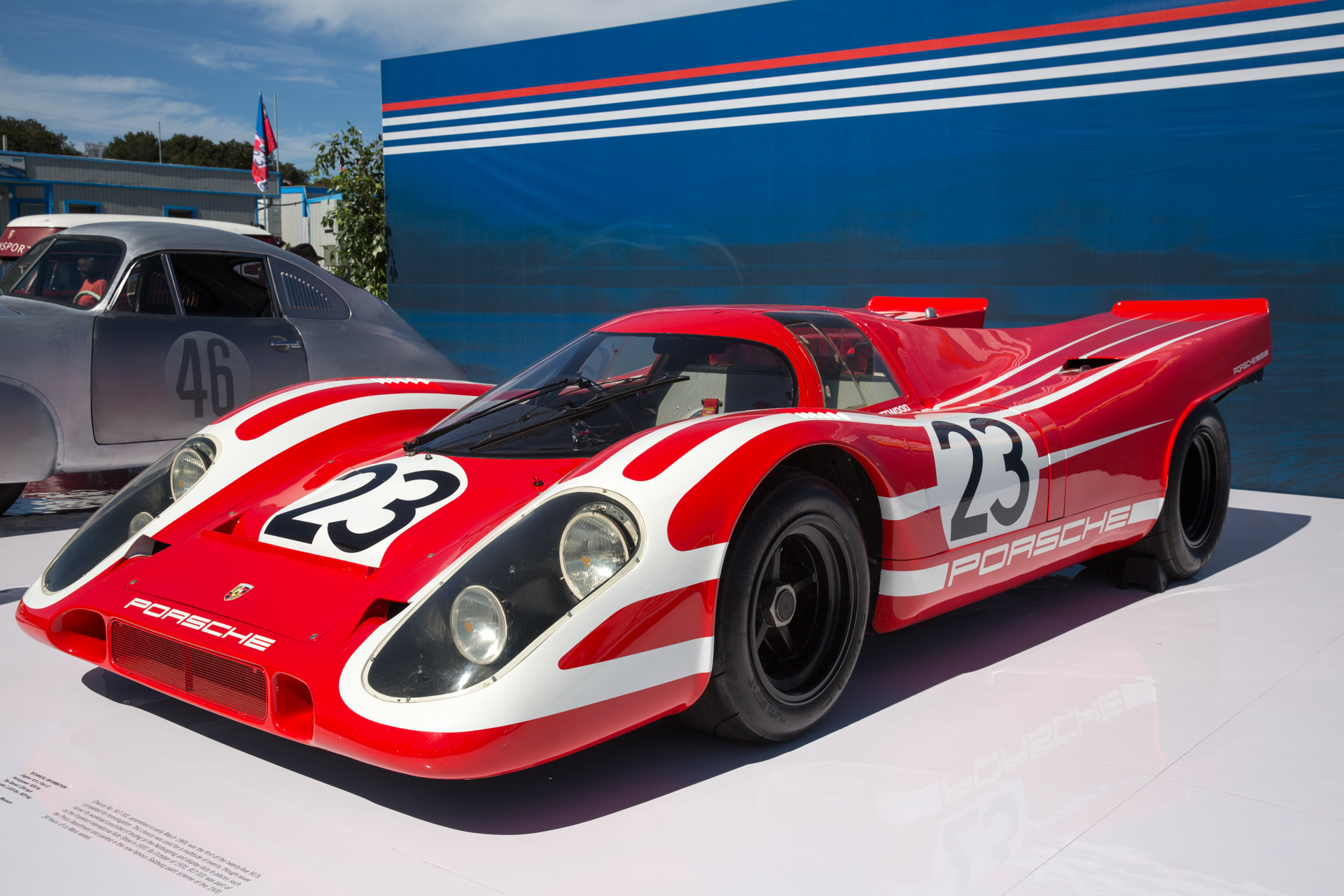
Porsche 917 Kurzheck 4.5L, winner 1970 24 Hours of Le Mans

Two 917 LH were entered in Le Mans, one in white and red trim by Porsche Salzburg. Driven by Vic Elford and Kurt Ahrens, the pole sitter's 4.9-litre engine dropped an inlet valve after 225 laps. Both drivers had also been entered on the team's other car, a red and white 917 K with the 4.5-litre engine, qualified by Hans Herrmann and Richard Attwood in rather low 15th spot, but they did not drive after their own car failed.

The other LH was entered by Martini Racing, qualified by Willi Kauhsen and Gérard Larrousse on 12th position. The livery of this car was elaborate whirls and swoops of light green on a dark blue background. The car with the 4.5L engine gained the nickname of the Hippie Car or the Psychedelic Porsche from the team and media.

Early in the race, most of the works Ferrari 512 entrants eliminated each other in a shunt. The two Porsche factory teams, Gulf-Wyer and Porsche Salzburg, continued to battle each other, but all Wyer cars were out after 12 hours. At the end it was the red and white #23 917K of Porsche Salzburg, with the standard 4.5-litre engine, carefully driven by Stuttgart's own Hans Herrmann and Englishman Richard Attwood through the pouring rain, that finally scored the first overall win at Le Mans, in a wet race that saw only 7 ranked finishers. Martini's 917LH came in 2nd. Both cars were later paraded across Stuttgart. In addition to Porsche's triumphant 1, 2 victory, a Porsche 908 came in third overall, a Porsche 914-6 came in sixth overall (plus it won the GT class), and a Porsche 911S was seventh. (Two Ferrari 512s took fourth and fifth place overall.)

Towards the end of the 1970 season, Ferrari entered some races with a new version of the 512, the 512M (Modificata). The 512M had a new bodywork built on a similar aerodynamic doctrine as the Porsche 917K. At the end of 1970 the 512M was as fast as the 917s, but still lacked in reliability.

During the 1970 season the FIA announced that Group 5 Sports Cars would be limited to a 3-litre engine capacity maximum for the newly renamed World Championship of Makes in 1972, so the big 917s and 512s would have to retire from the championship at the end 1971. Surprisingly, Ferrari decided to give up any official effort with the 512 in order to prepare for the 1972 season. A new prototype, the 312 PB, was presented and entered by the factory in several races. But many 512s were still raced by private teams, most of them converted to M specification.

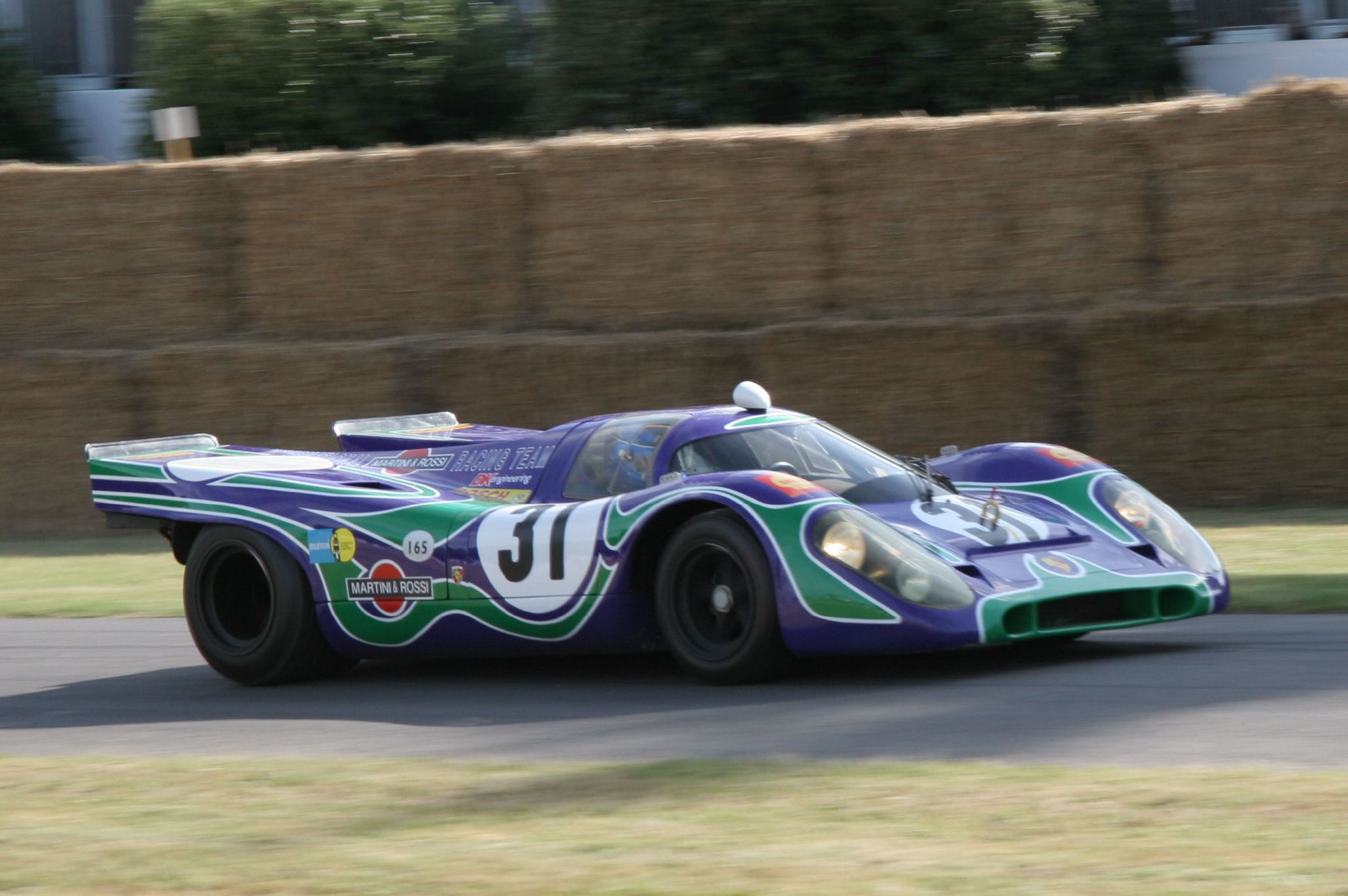
The Martini Racing blue and green "psychedelic" livery on a 1970 917K. This car raced at Watkins Glen in 1970.

By the end of 1970, Porsche had stamped their authority on endurance racing by convincingly dominating the championship that year. Of the 10 races in the championship (plus some other non-championship events), the works teams (JW Automotive and Porsche Salzburg) had won every race except Sebring (which was won by Ferrari) that year with the two models of cars they used, the 917K and the 908/03; with the 917K winning 7 of 8 events it was entered in; and the 908/03 winning at the Targa Florio and the Nürburgring (the 917K was not entered by the works teams at these two events). Still having some of their 25 cars remaining unsold, Ferrari offered them to customers at a bargain price – a move that had hardly been imaginable less than two years previously. For Porsche, the original production series of 25 917s could not satisfy demand. Over 50 chassis were built in total. An underdog for 20 years, Porsche had turned itself into the new leader of sports car racing with the 917.

==== 1971 ====
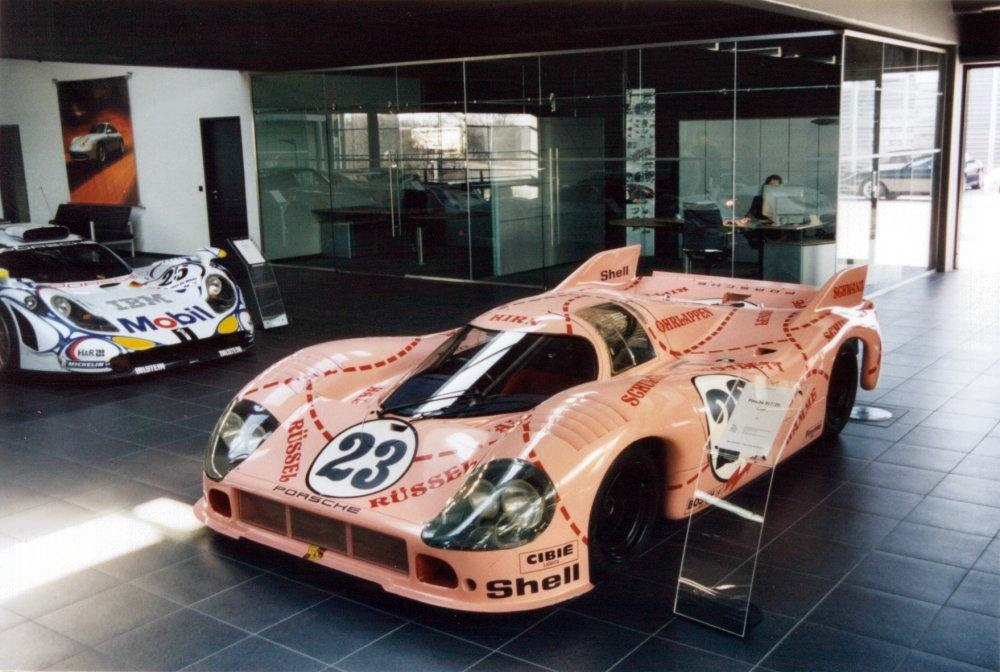
Porsche 917/20 "Pink Pig", in Stuttgart-Zuffenhausen Museum

The season began with the JW Automotive team scoring a 1-2 finish at the Buenos Aires 1000km, Jo Siffert and Derek Bell leading Pedro Rodriguez and Jackie Oliver home. At the 24 Hours of Daytona, much was expected of the Roger Penske Ferrari 512M which qualified on pole, almost 1.3 seconds ahead of the fastest 917. However, mechanical problems plagued the Ferrari and it finished third, 14 laps behind winners Rodriguez and Oliver. At the 12 Hours of Sebring it was the turn of the Martini Racing team to triumph, Vic Elford and Gerard Larrousse taking the honours.

The first upset came at the Brands Hatch 1000km. Ferrari and Alfa Romeo had turned their attention to developing cars for the forthcoming 3-litre regulations and the 312 PB and Tipo 33-3 were proving as fast as the 917s. At Brands Hatch, a large grid on the twisting, damp track suited the Italian cars and Porsche finished third behind the Alfa Romeo of Andrea de Adamich and Henri Pescarolo and the Ferrari of Jackie Ickx and Clay Regazzoni. The high-speed circuits at the Monza 1000km and Spa 1000km played to the 917's strengths and the JW-Gulf cars finished 1-2 in both races, Pedro Rodriguez and Jackie Oliver being the winners in both events.

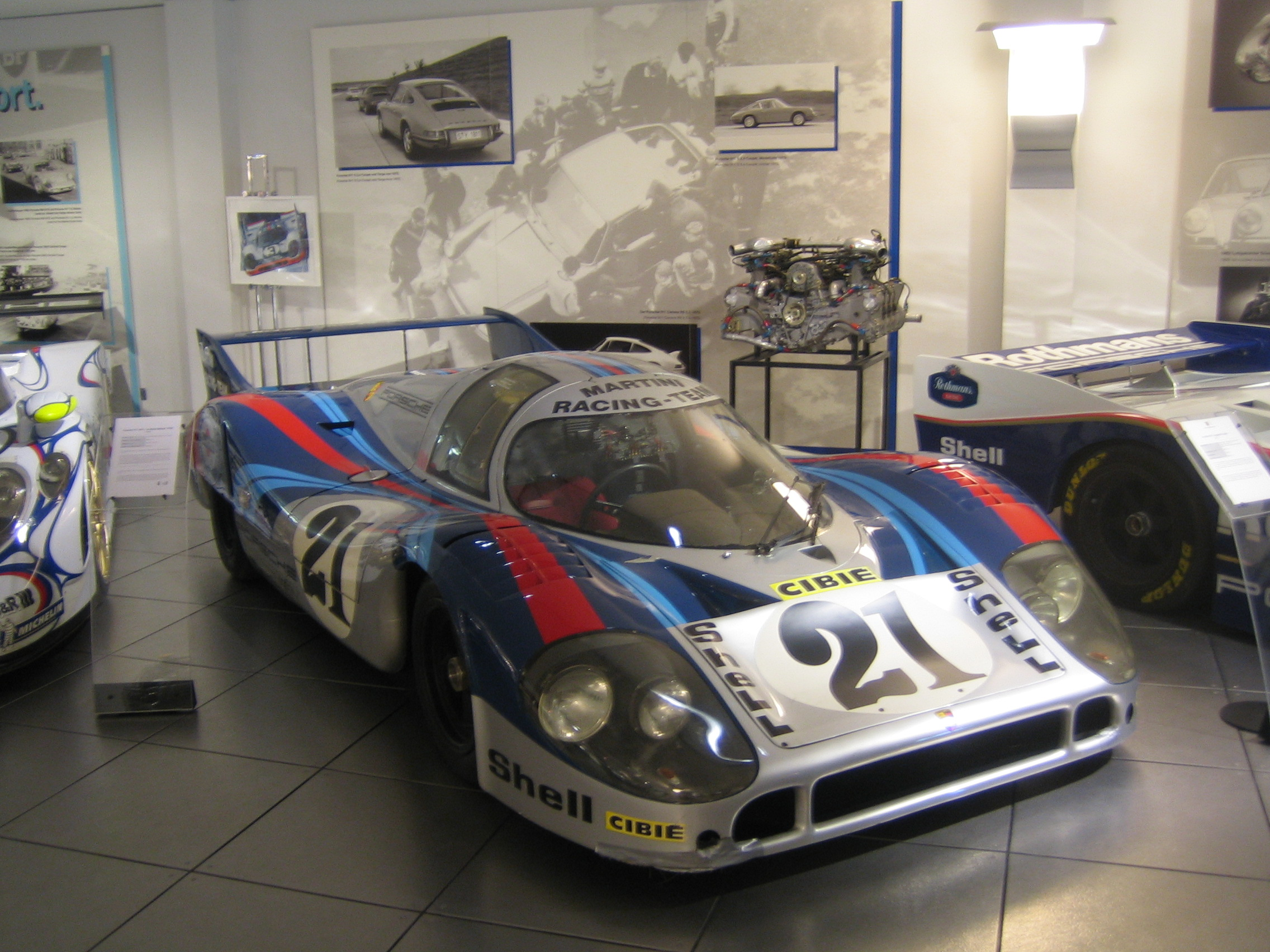
The 1971 917LH.

Throughout the season Porsche continued to develop the 917, introducing new versions of the short and long-tailed bodywork, and trying out a magnesium chassis, with which they would win the 1971 24 Hours of Le Mans. The most interesting development was the 917/20, built as test-bed for future Can-Am parts and aerodynamic "low-drag" concepts. The 917/20 had done well in the early-season Le Mans Test, but uncomplimentary remarks about its size and shape resulted in it being painted in pink for the 24 hour race, complete with names of cuts of meat written across it in German like a butcher's diagram. This earned it the nickname "Der Trüffeljäger von Zuffenhausen" (The Trufflehunter of Zuffenhausen, or just plain "Pink Pig". It qualified 7th and ran as high as 3rd, but during the night Reinhold Joest, co-driving with Willi Kauhsen, crashed the car at Arnage after its brakes failed.

Also at Le Mans the revised Langhecks, now cured of their earlier vices, all failed to finish, although Pedro Rodriguez set a fastest qualifying lap which, partly due to circuit changes, still stands today. The winning car was the Martini Racing 917K of Helmut Marko and Gijs van Lennep, equipped with a magnesium frame, which set an overall distance record that stood until 2010. All in all, four separate Le Mans track records were broken that year: fastest qualifying lap, fastest in-race lap, highest top speed, and longest distance covered, all set by 917s.

The Targa Florio and Nurburgring 1000km were again missed out by the works teams, although privateer Willi Kauhsen, partnered by Reinhold Joest took 5th place at the Nurburgring. The next race was another high-speed circuit, the Österreichring, where Pedro Rodriguez and Richard Attwood brought the only 917 finisher home in 1st place. The last race of the season, and the last race under the 5-litre capacity regulations, was the Watkins Glen 6 Hours. The Penske Ferrari again beat the 917 to the pole, but again suffered mechanical problems and failed to finish. However, the Alfa Romeo Tipo 33 of Andrea de Adamich and Ronnie Peterson beat the JW Porsches to the flag by a margin of two laps. And with that, the 917's World Sportscar career was over. JW Automotive took a car to the non-championship Barcelona 1000km and the 1000 km of Paris, Derek Bell and Gijs van Lennep winning the latter event.

The 917's swansong came in 1972, when Wilson Fittipaldi won the last race in the Copa Brasil series in the ex-Zitro Racing 917K.

=== 1972–1973 Can-Am ===
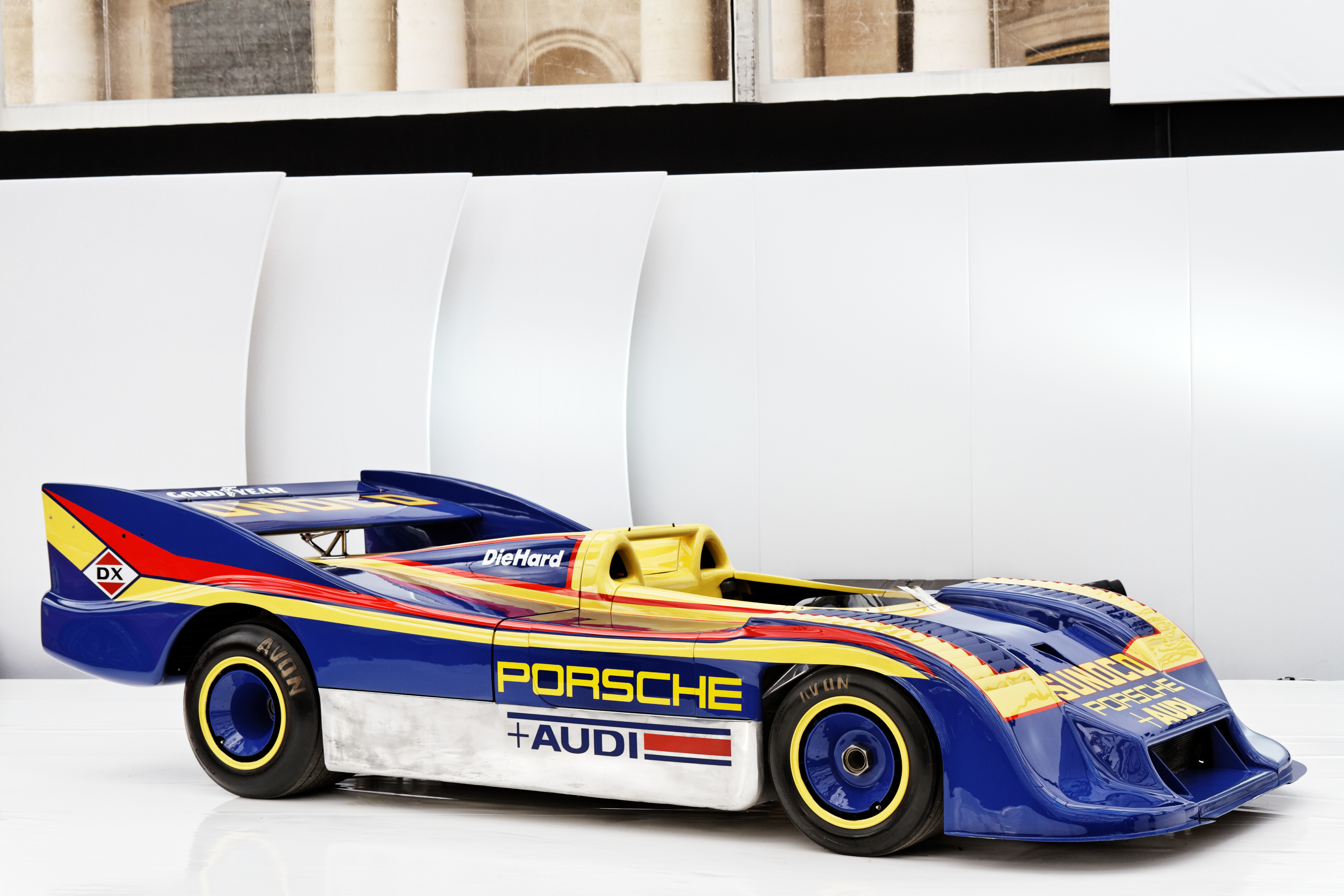
Porsche 917/30 CAN-AM

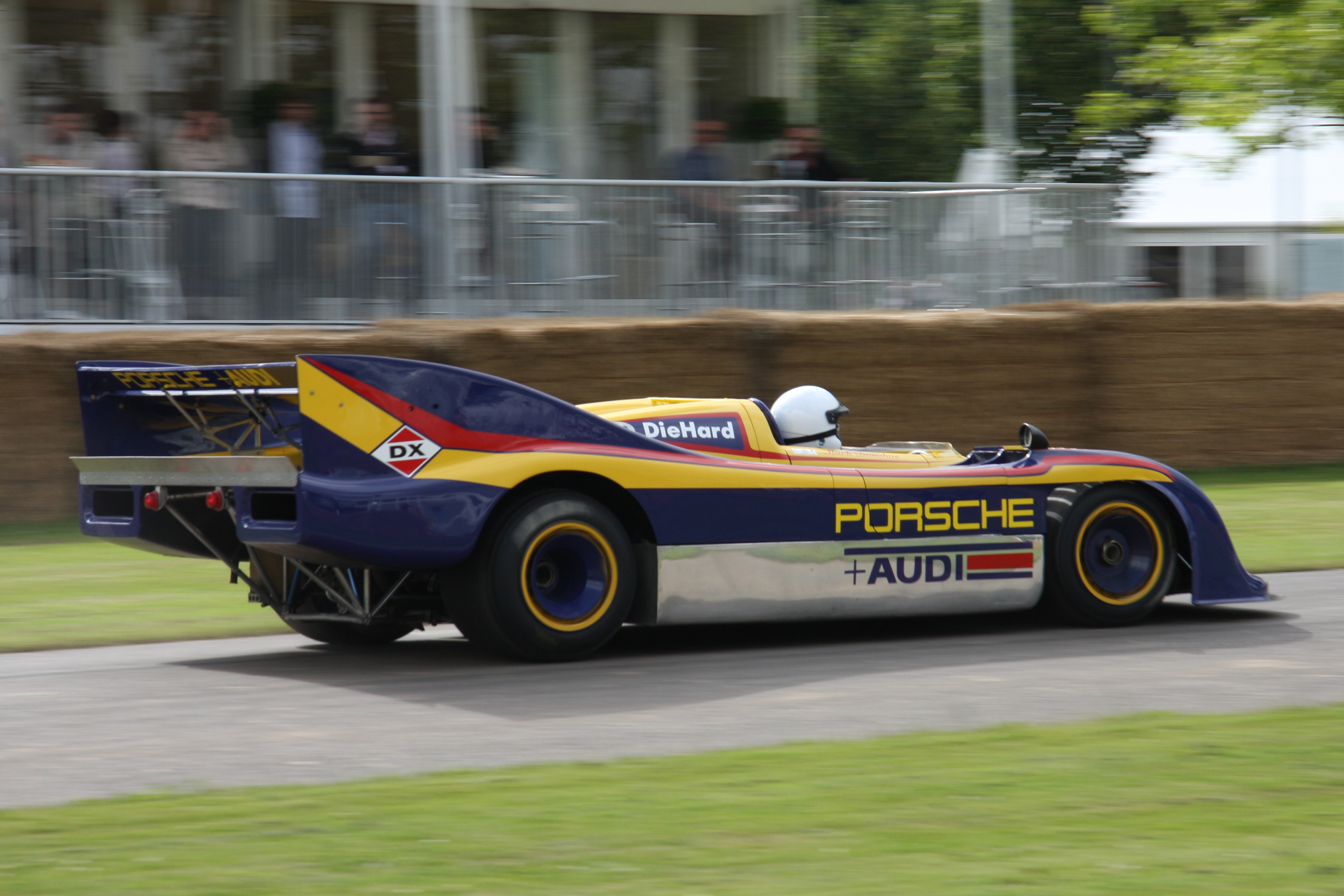
A rear three-quarter view of a 917/30

As the new rules for the 3-litre prototypes were not favourable to their existing low-weight, low-power Porsche 908, Porsche decided against developing a new high power engine that could keep up with the F1-based engine designs of the competition — at least in naturally aspirated form. In 1976 they would return to sport-prototype racing with the turbocharged Porsche 936 race cars after the engines were tested in Porsche 911 versions.

After their successes with the 917 mainly in Europe, Porsche instead decided to focus on the North American markets and the Can–Am Challenge. For that series, larger and more powerful engines were needed. Although a 16-cylinder engine with about 750 hp (560 kW) was tested, a turbocharged 12-cylinder engine with comparable power output was ultimately used. The 917 chassis also had to be lengthened to accept the longer 16-cylinder engine, and drivers complained that this longer chassis did not handle as well.

The turbocharged 850 hp (630 kW) 917/10K entered by Penske Racing won the 1972 series with George Follmer, after a testing accident sidelined primary driver Mark Donohue. This broke the five-year stranglehold McLaren had on the series. The further evolution of the 917, the 917/30 with revised aerodynamics, a longer wheelbase and an even stronger 5.4 litre engine with around 1,100 hp (820 kW) in race trim, won the 1973 edition winning all races but two. Charlie Kemp won the Mosport race, George Follmer won Road Atlanta and Mark Donohue won the rest. Most of the opposition was made of private 917/10K as McLaren, unable to compete against the 917 turbos, had already left the series to concentrate on Formula 1 and the Indy 500.

The 917's domination, the oil crisis, and fiery tragedies like Roger Williamson's in Zandvoort pushed the SCCA to introduce a 3 mpg_{‑US} (78 L/100 km) maximum fuel consumption rule for 1974. Due to this change, the Penske 917/30 competed in only one race in 1974, and some customers retrofitted their 917/10K with naturally aspirated engines.

The 917/30 was the most powerful sports car racer ever built and raced. The 5,374 cc (327.94 cu in) 12 cylinder (90.0 x 70.4 mm) twin-turbocharged engine could produce around 1,100 bhp (820 kW) at 7,800 rpm in race trim. The 917/30 dominated the Can-Am series during the 1973 season. The 917 was also the only championship winning car in Can Am not to be powered by Chevrolet.

=== 1981 ===
In 1981, it appeared that new Le Mans regulations would allow a 917 to race again. The Kremer Racing team entered a home-built updated 917, the 917 K-81.

The car raced at Le Mans, qualifying in the top 10, but retired after seven hours, after a collision with a back marker, which led to a loss of oil and subsequent withdrawal.

The final chapter though was to be at Brands Hatch, where the car ran in the 6 hours at the end of the season. The car was competitive and ran at or near the front, including a spell in the lead, until a suspension failure led to retirement.

== World Sportscar Championship victories ==
The Porsche 917 was homologated for May 1969 and could have participated in the last six WSC rounds, but Porsche mostly still preferred the Porsche 908 types L coupe and /02 sypder which won four of these six rounds. Le Mans was again lost to the Gulf-Wyer Ford before the 917 succeeded in the last race in Austria where it was later developed with the Gulf-Wyer-JWA team to the 917K shape. In 1970, the 917K lost only Sebring to its counterpart Ferrari 512S, as its strongest "opponent" was the nimble Porsche 908/03 "Targa special" the factory developed to win the twisty Targa Florio and Nürburgring races over the big Ferraris. In 1971, the Alfa T33 prototypes won three races, and the 908/03 again at the Nürburgring.

Year	Event	Entrant	Drivers
1969	(Austria) Zeltweg 1000 km	Karl Freiherr von Wendt	(Switzerland) Jo Siffert / (Germany) Kurt Ahrens Jr.
1970	(United States) 24 Hours of Daytona	J.W. Automotive Engineering	(Mexico) Pedro Rodriguez / (Finland) Leo Kinnunen / (United Kingdom) Brian Redman
1970	(United Kingdom) Brands Hatch 1000km	J.W. Automotive Engineering	(Mexico) Pedro Rodriguez / (Finland) Leo Kinnunen
1970	(Italy) Monza 1000km	J.W. Automotive Engineering	(Mexico) Pedro Rodriguez / (Finland) Leo Kinnunen
1970	(Belgium) Spa 1000km	J.W. Automotive Engineering	(Switzerland) Jo Siffert / (United Kingdom) Brian Redman
1970	(France) 24 Hours of Le Mans	Porsche Salzburg	(United Kingdom) Richard Attwood / (Germany) Hans Herrmann
1970	(United States) Watkins Glen 6 Hours	J.W. Automotive Engineering	(Mexico) Pedro Rodriguez / (Finland) Leo Kinnunen
1970	(Austria) Zeltweg 1000km	J.W. Automotive Engineering	(Switzerland) Jo Siffert / (United Kingdom) Brian Redman
1971	(Argentina) Buenos Aires 1000km	J.W. Automotive Engineering	(Switzerland) Jo Siffert / (United Kingdom) Derek Bell
1971	(United States) 24 Hours of Daytona	J.W. Automotive Engineering	(Mexico) Pedro Rodriguez / (United Kingdom) Jackie Oliver
1971	(United States) Sebring 12 Hours	Martini International Racing	(United Kingdom) Vic Elford / (France) Gerard Larrousse
1971	(Italy) Monza 1000 km	J.W. Automotive Engineering	(Mexico) Pedro Rodriguez / (United Kingdom) Jackie Oliver
1971	(Belgium) Spa 1000 km	J.W. Automotive Engineering	(Mexico) Pedro Rodriguez / (United Kingdom) Jackie Oliver
1971	(France) 24 Hours of Le Mans	Martini International Racing	(Netherlands) Gijs van Lennep / (Austria) Helmut Marko
1971	(Austria) Zeltweg 1000 km	J.W. Automotive Engineering	(Mexico) Pedro Rodriguez / (United Kingdom) Richard Attwood

== Individual production and race history ==
In 1969–71 production consisted of 43 naturally aspirated cars (36 K, 5 LH and 2 Spyders) and 16 turbocharged (13 917/10 and 3 917/30), for a total of 59 917s built. The table below summaries the racing history of each chassis. Multiple winners have each win listed, but otherwise only the best result for each chassis is mentioned.

Chassis Number	History	Status
917-001	Used as exhibition car. Painted as the 1970 Le Mans winner for many years.	Restored to original specification in 2019.
917-002	Porsche Systems Engineering entry, 1st at 1969 Le Mans test (Rolf Stommelen). DNF at 1969 Spa 1000 km (Udo Schutz-Gerhard Mitter), then used as a test car.	Scrapped.
917-003	Porsche Systems Engineering entry, 11th at 1969 Le Mans test (Hans Herrmann/Rolf Stommelen). Practiced at 1969 Spa 1000 km (Jo Siffert-Brian Redman) but not used in the race. Then used as test car.	Scrapped.
917-004	Porsche Systems Engineering entry, 8th at 1969 Nurburgring 1000 km (David Piper-Frank Gardner). JW Automotive entry damaged in accident at 1970 Brands Hatch 1000 km (Brian Redman-Jo Siffert), repaired using chassis 017. Original 004 chassis returned to Porsche for repair.	Acquired by Bruce McCaw in 1992.
917-005	Sold to John Woolfe Racing. Entered at 1969 24 Hours of Le Mans for Woolfe and Herbert Linge. Destroyed in Woolfe's fatal accident.	VIN plate acquired by Willi Kauhsen and used to construct a replica.
917-006	Porsche Systems Engineering spare car at 1969 24 Hours of Le Mans. Later used as a test car.	Scrapped.
917-007	Porsche Systems Engineering entry at 1969 24 Hours of Le Mans (Rolf Stommelen-Kurt Ahrens Jr.), DNF. Sold to Hans-Georg Biermann, driven by Jürgen Neuhaus in his 1970 Interserie winning season. Crashed at 1970 Paris 1000 km (Jürgen Neuhaus-Willi Kauhsen) and rebuilt as 917 Spyder. Raced by Michel Weber in 1971 Interserie.	Acquired by Hans-Dieter Blatzheim in 1974.
917-008	Porsche Systems Engineering entry at 1969 24 Hours of Le Mans (Vic Elford-Richard Attwood), DNF. Tested by JW Automotive team at Zeltweg; it was at this test that the concept of the Kurz tail was prototyped.	Acquired by S.A.M. Amstar in 2018.
917-009	Works car run by Karl Freiherr von Wendt. 1st at 1969 Austrian 1000 km (Jo Siffert-Kurt Ahrens Jr.). Entered by JW Automotive throughout 1970 and 1971, 2nd at 1971 Sebring 12 Hours.	Last acquired by Charles Nearburg.
917-010	Sold to David Piper. 3rd at 1969 Austrian 1000 km (Richard Attwood-Brian Redman). Campaigned extensively by Piper throughout 1969, 1970 and 1971. 1st at 1969 Kyalami 9 Hours (David Piper-Richard Attwood).	Still owned by Piper.
917-011	Porsche Konstruktionen entry at 1970 24 Hours of Daytona (Kurt Ahrens Jr.-Vic Elford), DNF.	Written off in accident during testing for the Targa Florio.
917-012	Sold to Racing Team AAW. Raced throughout 1970 in endurance and Interserie, occasionally as a Martini Racing entry. 1st at 1970 Swedish Grand Prix (Gijs van Lennep). Stripped and parts used to build up 021. The chassis was later sold and built up as a road-going car.	Acquired by Bobby Rahal in 2012.
917-013	JW Automotive car in 1970. 4th at Sebring 12 Hours in 1970 (Pedro Rodriguez-Leo Kinnunen-Jo Siffert). This car was entered at the 1970 Le Mans for Steve McQueen and Jackie Stewart, but the entry was withdrawn as McQueen was unable to get insurance. Sold to Solar Productions and used in the film Le Mans. David Piper crashed the car during filming. Chassis 034 was later labelled as 013.	Scrapped.
917-014	JW Automotive car in 1970. 1st at 1970 Spa 1000 km (Jo Siffert-Brian Redman). Chassis 029 was later labelled as 014.	014's fate is unknown.
917-015	JW Automotive car in 1970. 1st at 1970 24 Hours of Daytona (Pedro Rodriguez-Leo Kinnunen-Brian Redman). Chassis number then transferred to 035.	Retained by Porsche.
917-016	JW Automotive car in 1970. 1st at 1970 Brands Hatch 1000 km, Monza 1000 km and Watkins Glen 6 Hours (Pedro Rodriguez-Leo Kinnunen-Brian Redman). Spare car in 1971.	Acquired by Chris McAllister in 1996.
917-017	JW Automotive car in 1970. Used to rebuild 004 and tagged as such. 2nd at 1971 Monza 1000 km (Derek Bell-Jo Siffert)	Acquired by David Piper in 1990.
917-018	Sold to Alex Soler-Roig and raced by him in the Spanish Sportscar Championship of 1970.	Acquired by Chuck Stoddard in 1975.
917-019	Porsche Audi car in 1970. 4th at 1970 Watkins Glen 6 Hours (Vic Elford-Denny Hulme). Martini Racing car for 1971, DNF any races.	Acquired by the Revs Institute in 1998.
917-020	Porsche Konstruktionen car in 1970, 3rd at 1970 Brands Hatch 1000 km (Richard Attwood-Hans Herrmann). Martini Racing car for 1971, 1st at 1971 Sebring 12 Hours (Vic Elford-Gerard Larrousse).	Acquired by Symbolic Motors in 1999. Restored to Martini Racing colours.
917-021	Sold to Racing Team AAW. 5th at 1970 Spa 1000 km (Hans Laine-Gijs van Lennep). Crashed at 1970 24 Hours of Le Mans (Gijs van Lennep-David Piper).	Used to rebuild 012.
917-022	Sold to Solar Productions and became the car driven by Steve McQueen in the film Le Mans. Sold to Willi Kauhsen in 1971 and raced by Team Auto Usdau. 4th at 1971 Spa 1000 km (Willi Kauhsen-Reinhold Joest).	Acquired by Jerry Seinfeld in 2002, who asked Joe Cavaglieri to fully restore it to the 1971 film era in Gulf Porsche team livery. 022 will be auctioned on 18 January 2025 by Mecum Auctions. 022 has a dedicated webpage and video.
917-023	Porsche Konstruktionen entry, 1st at 1970 24 Hours of Le Mans (Richard Attwood-Hans Herrmann). Martini Racing car in 1971, 9th at 1971 Brands Hatch 1000 km (Gijs van Lennep-Gerard Larrousse).	Acquired by Carlos Monteverde in 2011.
917-024	Porsche System Engineering entry at 1969 Spa 1000 km (Gerhard Mitter-Udo Schutz), DNF. JW Automotive entry, 1st at 1970 Le Mans test (Mike Hailwood-Brian Redman), then sold to Jo Siffert. Leased to Solar Productions.	Last sold in 2017.
917-025	Sold to Jaime Ortiz-Patino. Raced in Interserie (1970) and WSC (1971) under the Zitro Racing banner. 9th at 1971 Monza 1000 km (Dominique Martin-Gerard Pillon). Sold to Wilson Fittipaldi for 1971 Copa Brasil races.	Acquired by Miles Collier in 1984.
917-026	JW Automotive car, written off by Mike Hailwood at 1970 24 Hours of Le Mans (Mike Hailwood-David Hobbs. Rebuilt using chassis 031 but kept 026's identity. 026 later rebuilt as a Spyder and identified as 031. Sold to Ernst Kraus who raced it in 1971 Interserie.	Acquired by Jeff Hayes and restored to 1970 Le Mans specification.
917-027	Prototype 917 PA. Modified as test bed for flat-16 engine.	Retained by Porsche.
917-028	Porsche Audi Can-Am car. Driven by Jo Siffert to 4th place in the 1969 Can-Am Championship. Sold to Vasek Polak who campaigned it in Can-Am from 1971 to 1973, driven by Milt Minter (1971), Sam Posey (1972) and Steve Durst (1973).	Acquired by Miles Collier.
917-029	Spare chassis, used to rebuild JW Automotive's 014 and identified as such. 1st at 1971 Buenos Aires 1000 km (Derek Bell-Jo Siffert).	
917-030	Martini Racing entry at 1971 Zeltweg 1000 km (Helmut Marko-Gerard Larrousse), DNF. Then returned to Porsche and used for ABS testing.	Converted to road car in 1975 and presented to Count Gregorio Rossi di Montelera as a road car. Still in Rossi family.
917-031	Spare chassis, used to repair JW Automotive's 026 and identified as same. 1st at 1970 Zeltweg 1000 km (Jo Siffert-Brian Redman).	
917-032	Spare chassis, used as test car by Derek Bell & Jo Siffert in 1970.	Acquired by Willi Kauhsen and rebuilt.
917-033	Spare chassis, unused.	Passed through various owners and eventually acquired by Jean-Claude Miloe. Restored in 2000 by Raceline Feustel.
917-034	Spare chassis, used to repair JW Automotive's 013 and identified as such. 1st at 1971 24 Hours of Daytona and 1971 Monza 1000 km (Pedro Rodriguez-Jackie Oliver) and at 1971 Zeltweg 1000 km (Richard Attwood-Pedro Rodriguez).	Acquired by Mark Finburgh in 1974.
917-035	Spare chassis, used to replace JW Automotive's 015 and identified as such. 1st at 1971 Spa 1000 km (Pedro Rodriguez-Jackie Oliver).	Acquired by Gilles Bochand in 1985.
917-036	Car sold without engine. Never raced.	Acquired by Vasek Polak in 1975 and sold on in 2005.
917-037	Spare chassis, acquired by coachbuilder Karosserie Baur in late 70s.	Restored circa 2000, acquired in 2016 by Claudio Roddaro who modified it to make it road-legal.
917-040	Test car using parts of 917-006. Scrapped after bad accident at the Ehra-Lessien test track by Kurt Ahrens Jr., completely destroyed.	
917-041	JW Automotive entry, 15th at 1970 Le Mans test (Herbert Linge). Damaged by Willi Kauhsen at the Ehra-Lessien test track. Dismantled for inspection.	Acquired by Olivier Boyadjian in 1992.
917-042	Porsche Konstruktionen car at 1970 24 Hours of Le Mans (Vic Elford-Kurt Ahrens Jr.), DNF, and then to Martini Racing for 1971 24 Hours of Le Mans (Gerard Larrousse-Vic Elford), also DNF.	Porsche Museum
917-043	Martini Racing entry, 2nd at 1970 24 Hours of Le Mans (Gerard Larrousse-Willi Kauhsen). Modified for 1971. 1st at 1971 Le Mans Test (Jackie Oliver-Gijs van Lennep-Jo Siffert) and DNF at 1971 24 Hours of Le Mans (Pedro Rodriguez-Jackie Oliver). Racing history confirmed by the archives of Porsche Museum.	Acquired by Frank Sytner in 2024, part of the Sytner Automotive Collection
917-044	Reserve chassis that stay unraced in 1970 and 1971 as confirmed by Naher's book.	Simeone Foundation Automotive Museum.
917-045	JW Automotive entry at 1971 24 Hours of Le Mans (Jo Siffert-Derek Bell), DNF.	Le Mans museum.
917-051	Magnesium chassis.	Scrapped after tests
917-052	Magnesium chassis. JW Automotive entry, 2nd at Le Mans test 1971 (Jo Siffert-Derek Bell-Jackie Oliver).	Scrapped after tests
917-053	Magnesium chassis. Martini Racing entry, 1st at 1971 24 Hours of Le Mans (Helmut Marko-Gijs van Lennep).	Retained by Porsche AG and on display at Porsche Museum.
917-01-021	Spyder. Built using chassis 015. Gunnar Racing restored 917-015 from 917-01-021 in 1999-2000, but re-created 917-01-021 using the original roll bar and rear section of the chassis. All of the original suspension, engine, gearbox and bodywork from the Spyder have been used in the rebuild.	TBC
917/10
917/10-001	Prototype, development car. Raced in Can-Am and Interserie by Willi Kauhsen Racing Team in 1972 and 1973, 2nd at Hockenheim in 1972, driven by Kauhsen.	
917/10-002	First customer Spyder. Delivered new to Jo Siffert, competed in 1971 Can-Am series and finished fourth in championship. Sold in 1972 to Willi Kauhsen who raced in Interserie, first place at Imola.	
917/10-003	Roger Penske Can-Am car for 1972, driven by championship winner George Follmer. Follmer drove it again in 1973 for Rinzler Motor Racing, finishing second in the championship.	Originally part of the Vasek Polak collection since 1974. Sold in 1998 to John McCaw and was used in historic racing in the US. Later sold again in 2012 for $5.5 million to an unknown buyer.
917/10-004	AAW Racing Team entry for 1972 Interserie, driver Leo Kinnunen won that year's championship, and again in 1973.	In 1992 the car was sold to Jobst Heemeyer of Bremen, Germany
917/10-005	Roger Penske Can-Am car for 1972, raced mostly by Mark Donohue. Then driven by Charlie Kemp in 1973 for Rizler Motor Racing.	Owned by Porsche AG and has been displayed in museums for its entire life. Permanently exhibited in Leipzig Porsche Museum.
917/10-006	Vasek Polak Can-Am car for 1972, driven by Milt Minter. Hans Wiedmer then drove it in 1973.	Sold in 1991 to Jobst Heemeyer in Germany.
917/10-007	Brumos Racing Can-Am car for 1972, driven by Peter Gregg and then by Hurley Haywood in 1973.	Acquired by Brumos in 1997.
917/10-008	Can-Am Spyder.	Was once owned by Carl Thompson but was then sold in 2006 to Manfred Freisinger of Freisinger Motorsport where it received a complete restoration. Was raced a few times in 2008 in Europe.
917/10-010	Test magnesium chassis.	Scrapped.
917/10-011	Roger Penske Can-Am car for 1972, damaged during testing by Mark Donohue.	Scrapped.
917/10-015	Willi Kauhsen Interserie car for 1973 and 1974. Kauhsen finished 2nd (1973) and 3rd (1974) in the championship.	Acquired by William "Chip" Connor in 2006.
917/10-016	Ernst Kraus purchased this car new in 1973. Boeri Racing Interserie car for 1973-1975, driven by Kraus.	Acquired by Ottokar Jacobs in 1998.
917/10-017	George Loos originally purchased and raced this car in Interserie in 1973. In 1975 Tim Schenken drove it in Interserie for Loos' Gelo Team.	Acquired by Bruce Canepa in 1998.
917/10-018	Vasek Polak Can-Am car for 1973, driven by Jody Scheckter to 6th place in the championship.	Acquired by Scheckter in 1999.
917/20
917/20-001	Aerodynamic test car, low-drag bodywork developed by SERA. Known as the "Pink Pig". DNF at 1971 24 Hours of Le Mans (Willi Kauhsen-Reinhold Joest).	Porsche Museum.
917/30
917/30-001	Original Can-Am test chassis with adjustable frame and wheelbase. Was tested with Mark Donohue in 1972 and 1973. Felder Racing car in late 1973 Interserie, driven by Helmut Kelleners. and then raced by Herbert Müller in 1974-1975 Interserie in Martini Racing colours.	Retained by Porsche AG.
917/30-002	Sunoco/Penske Can-Am car for 1973, driven by Mark Donohue. Badly damaged in an accident at the Watkins Glen event. Penske rebuilt the car where it served as a spare car for the remainder of the season.	Retained by Porsche AG.
917/30-003	Sunoco/Penske Can-Am car for 1973. Mark Donohue saw much success in this car, winning the 1973 Can-Am Championship. In 1974, Brian Redman raced this car at Mid-Ohio where he would finish in 2nd place. Donohue would later drive 003 at Talladega Superspeedway where he would set a closed-course world record at 221.160 mph.	Acquired by the Jack Setton Collection.
917/30-004	Build started in 1973 as a 1974 Penske team chassis, and the primary car for Mark Donohue. However the build was suspended because of rule changes, but later completed by Porsche.	Last acquired by Bruce Canepa in 2016.
917/30-005	Build started in 1973 as a 1974 Penske team chassis, suspended because of rule changes.	Last acquired in 2011 by Peter Harburg.
917/30-006	Build started in 1973 as a 1974 Penske team chassis, suspended because of rule changes. Sold as a kit of parts to Vasek Polak.	Last acquired in 2010 by John Inglessis.
Kremer
917K81	Built in 1981 from a mix of Porsche-sourced spares and a new Kremer-built spaceframe with extra stiffening. Off the pace at Le Mans 1981 (Bob Wollek-Xavier Lapeyre-Guy Chasseuil) qualifying 18th and retiring after 7 hours with an oil leak caused by an off-road excursion.	Kremer factory museum.

== Model specifications ==
Variant Name	Years Produced	Engine type	Displacement	Horsepower	Torque	Weight	Length	Width	Height	Wheelbase	Citation
917 LH-69	1969	Flat-twelve Naturally aspirated	4,494 cc (274.2 cu in)	512 hp (382 kW) @ 8,000 rpm	449 N⋅m (331 lb⋅ft) @ 6,800 rpm	952 kg (2,099 lb)	4,780 mm (188 in)	1,880 mm (74 in)	920 mm (36 in)	2,300 mm (91 in)	
917 K-69	1969	Flat-twelve Naturally aspirated	4,494 cc (274.2 cu in)	512 hp (382 kW) @ 8,000 rpm	449 N⋅m (331 lb⋅ft) @ 6,800 rpm	944 kg (2,081 lb)	4,780 mm (188 in)	1,880 mm (74 in)	920 mm (36 in)	2,300 mm (91 in)	
917 Interserie Spyder	1969 - 1970	Flat-twelve Naturally aspirated	4,494 cc (274.2 cu in)	580 hp (430 kW) @ 8,000 rpm	563 N⋅m (415 lb⋅ft) @ 6,400 rpm	800 kg (1,800 lb)	4,140 mm (163 in)	1,980 mm (78 in)	920 mm (36 in)	2,300 mm (91 in)	
917 LH-70	1970	Flat-twelve Naturally aspirated	4,494 cc (274.2 cu in)	572 hp (427 kW) @ 8,000	508 N⋅m (375 lb⋅ft) @ 6,800	856 kg (1,887 lb)	4,600 mm (180 in)	1,980 mm (78 in)	920 mm (36 in)	2,300 mm (91 in)	
917 LH-70	1970	Flat-twelve Naturally aspirated	4,907 cc (299.4 cu in)	591 hp (441 kW)	548 N⋅m (404 lb⋅ft)	858 kg (1,892 lb)	4,600 mm (180 in)	1,980 mm (78 in)	920 mm (36 in)	2,300 mm (91 in)	
917 K-70	1970	Flat-twelve Naturally aspirated	4,494 cc (274.2 cu in)	572 hp (427 kW) @ 8,400 rpm	510 N⋅m (376 lb⋅ft) @ 6,800 rpm	827 kg (1,823 lb)	4,290 mm (169 in)	1,980 mm (78 in)	920 mm (36 in)	2,300 mm (91 in)	
917 LH-71	1971	Flat-twelve Naturally aspirated	4,907 cc (299.4 cu in)	591 hp (441 kW)	548 N⋅m (404 lb⋅ft)	916 kg (2,019 lb)	4,960 mm (195 in)	2,216 mm (87.2 in)	926 mm (36.5 in)	2,300 mm (91 in)	
917 K-71	1971	Flat-twelve Naturally aspirated	4,494 cc (274.2 cu in)	572 hp (427 kW) @ 8,400 rpm	510 N⋅m (376 lb⋅ft) @ 6,800 rpm	927 kg (2,044 lb)	4,120 mm (162 in)	1,980 mm (78 in)	920 mm (36 in)	2,300 mm (91 in)	
917/20	1971	Flat-twelve Naturally aspirated	4,907 cc (299.4 cu in)	591 hp (441 kW)	548 N⋅m (404 lb⋅ft)	909 kg (2,004 lb)	3,960 mm (156 in)	2,216 mm (87.2 in)	926 mm (36.5 in)	2,300 mm (91 in)	
917/10	1971	Flat-twelve Naturally aspirated	4,998 cc (305.0 cu in)	630 hp (470 kW) @ 8,300 rpm	576 N⋅m (425 lb⋅ft) @ 6,400 rpm	743 kg (1,638 lb)	4,380 mm (172 in)	2,100 mm (83 in)	1,155 mm (45.5 in)	2,300 mm (91 in)	
917/16	1971	Flat-sixteen Naturally aspirated	6,543 cc (399.3 cu in)	840 hp (630 kW) @ 8,300 rpm	735 N⋅m (542 lb⋅ft)	841 kg (1,854 lb)	3,905 mm (153.7 in)	2,010 mm (79 in)	930 mm (37 in)	2,570 mm (101 in)	
917/10 Turbo	1972	Flat-twelve Twin-turbo	5,374 cc (327.9 cu in)	1,135 hp (846 kW)	1,100 N⋅m (800 lb⋅ft)	837 kg (1,845 lb)	4,385 mm (172.6 in)	2,100 mm (83 in)	1,180 mm (46 in)	2,316 mm (91.2 in)	
917/30	1972-1973	Flat-twelve Twin-turbo	5,374 cc (327.9 cu in)	1,183 hp (882 kW) @ 7,800 rpm	1,110 N⋅m (820 lb⋅ft) @ 6,400 rpm	800 kg (1,800 lb)	4,562 mm (179.6 in)	2,085 mm (82.1 in)	1,080 mm (43 in)	2,500 mm (98 in)	

== Other uses ==
On 9 August 1975, Porsche and Penske would give the Can-Am car its final send off in style, when they took their 917/30 to Talladega to break the FIA speed record on a closed circuit. With Mark Donohue driving, the average speed reached was 221.160 mph (355.923 km/h). As well as being the last official outing for the 917, it was the last major accomplishment for Donohue before his fatal accident in practice for the Austrian Grand Prix a week later. The record would stand until 1980.

Several 917 coupés as well as 917/10s (powered by turbos or NA engines) were run in Europe's Interserie until the mid-1970s.

Many 917 leftover parts, especially chassis, suspension and brake components, would be used to build the Porsche 936 in 1976.

Despite the car's impracticality, at least three 917s were road-registered:

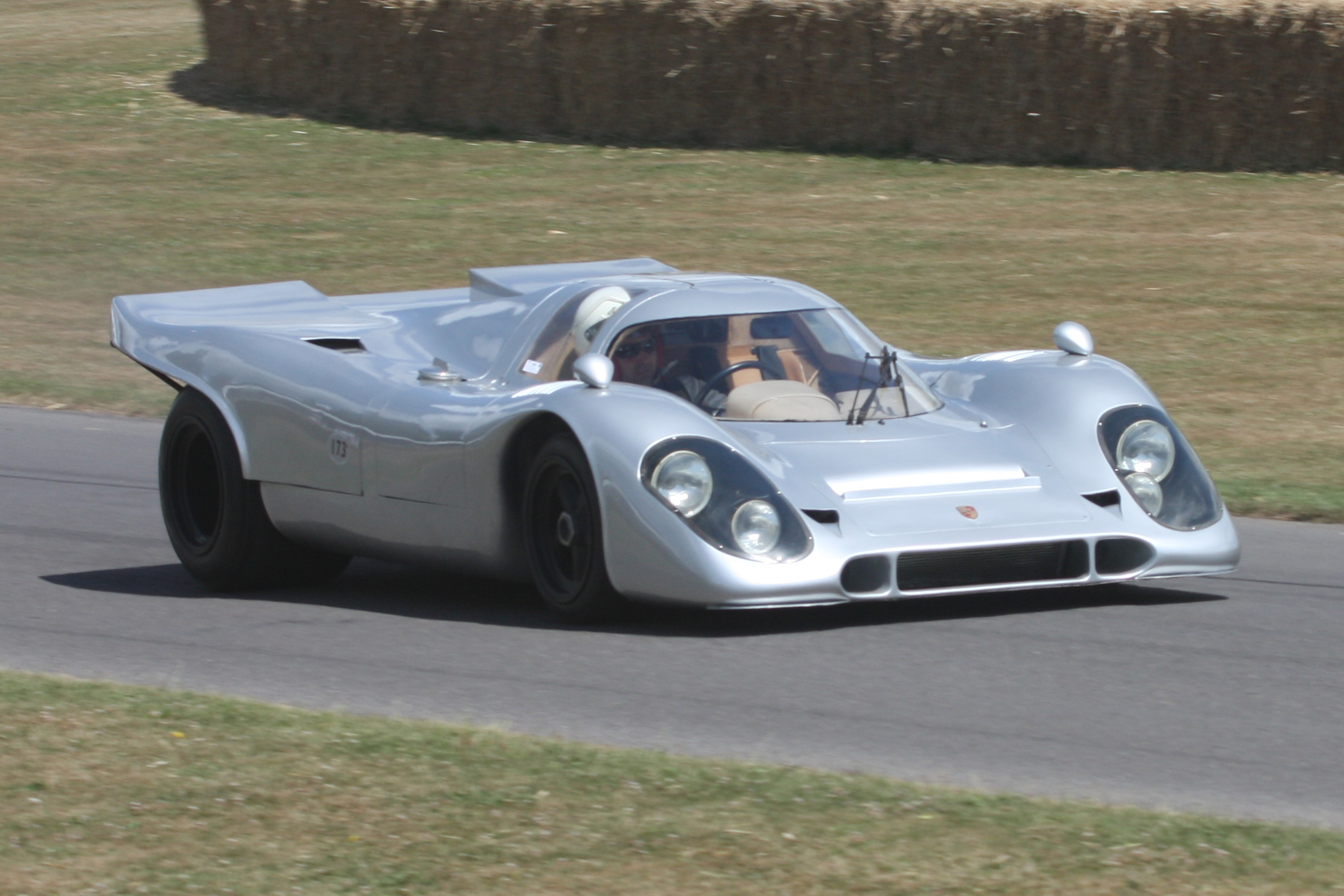
The Porsche 917K Chassis no. 30, registered for road use

- Count Gregorio Rossi di Montelera of the Martini company, bought chassis 030 from Porsche. He raced it once under the Martini Racing Team Flag at the Zeltweg 1000 km World Championship race on 27 June 1971. After the race, it was returned to the factory, where it was modified with basic road equipment (exterior mirrors, turn signals, exhaust system and comfort modifications) and painted silver. None of the European authorities would certify the car for road use and Rossi obtained the Alabama plate 61-27737 to circumvent the problems.
- The second, for Joachim Grossmann, was painted white and given the German registration CW-K 917. The Danish car magazine Bilen in a 1977 article details how Grossmann bought the frame and other components in 1975 for 20,000 DM, rebuilt it and then modified it (examples: turn signals, hand brake, Safety glass windows and some modifications to the exhaust system) to satisfy German safety inspectors leading to the registration.
- Claudio Roddaro was able to register another original 917 that was modified for the road, in Monaco in 2016. Chassis number 037 was accepted based upon the precedent of Count Rossi's road registered example.

Several high end replicas that use the flat-6 from the 911 have been also be made. One is built in Australia by Kraftwerkz, another in the US by Race-Car Replicas.

In addition, a grass roots "replica," the Laser 917, which is essentially a rebodied VW Beetle, was featured in the film Herbie Goes to Monte Carlo.

The Gulf Oil liveried 917 'Kurzhecks' are also prominently featured in the Steve McQueen film Le Mans competing against Ferrari's 512 Coda Lunga.

Aurora slot cars released some of these Porsche 917s in their AFX line-up, replicated to their original colours and markings. They were widely available in the early to mid-70s and were raced completely stock.

A replica of a 917/10 was used in the 1981 film The Last Chase.
