= Vasek Polak =

- Born: Vašek Polák; September 11, 1914; Prague, Bohemia, Austria-Hungary
- Died: April 17, 1997 (aged 82); Great Falls, Montana, US
- Occupation(s): Car dealer, race car driver, race team owner

Vasek Polak (Czech: Vašek Polák; September 11, 1914 – April 17, 1997) was a Czech-American car dealer, race car driver, car collector and racing team owner.

== Life ==
Polak was born in Prague, Bohemia, Austria-Hungary on September 11, 1914. He fought in World War II and was wounded in the Prague uprising on May 5, 1945. Polak then left Prague and walked to then West Germany and found a job as a U.S. Army motor pool mechanic. Eventually moving to New York City, Polak opened a repair shop in 1951. In 1958 Polak moved to Hermosa Beach, California and through contact with Ferry Porsche, whom he had known in Europe through motorsport contacts, opened the first exclusive Porsche dealership in the United States in 1959. Polak would later on also become a franchised dealer for Volkswagen, Audi, BMW, Saab, and Subaru in Hermosa Beach.

Polak married Anna Maria Littlejohn in 1983. She died from breast cancer in 1993. Polak in response donated $2 million to fund a treatment center for breast cancer at Torrance Memorial Medical Center.

Vasek Polak died on April, 17 1997 from cardiac arrest resulting from complications due to an accident on the German Autobahn one month earlier. He was driving a Porsche 911 Turbo S when he crashed at speeds in excess of 110 mph, breaking both of his arms and legs. After a month of recuperation Polak was returning to California in an airplane fitted with an intensive care unit, however when refueling in Great Falls, Montana he went into cardiac arrest and died.

== Motorsports ==
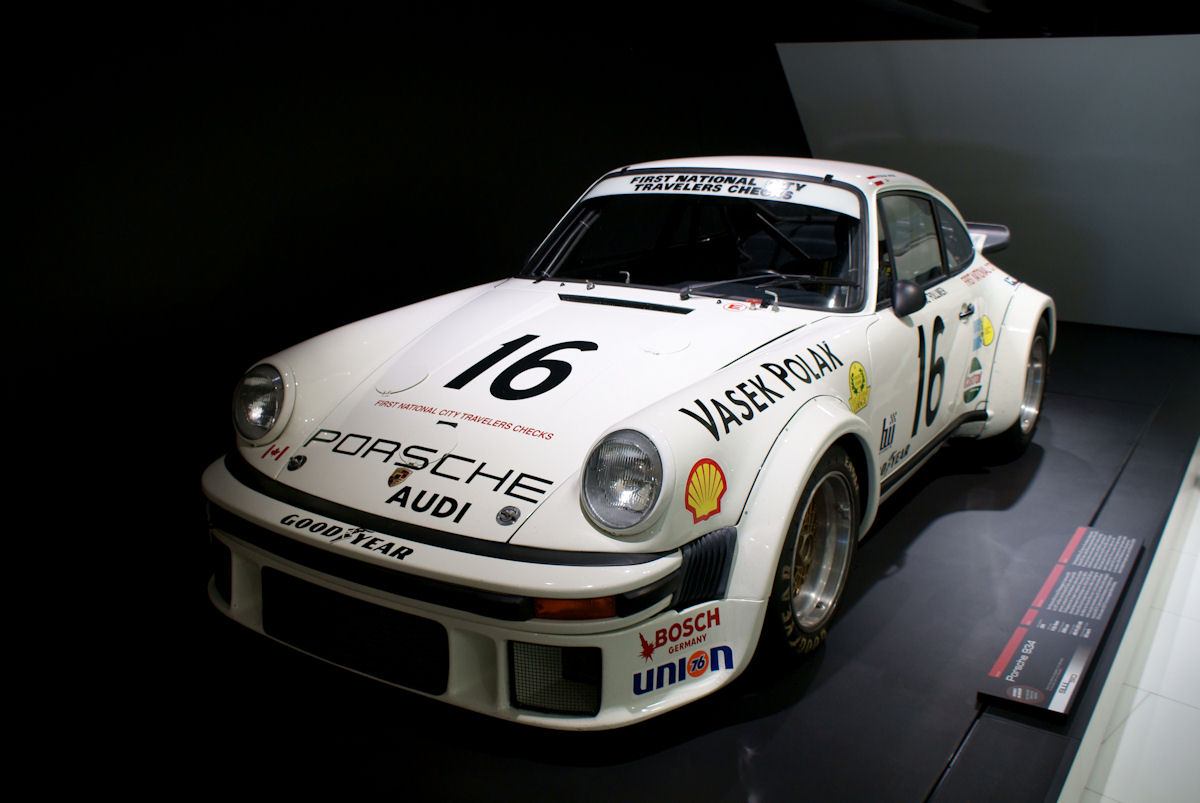
A 1976 Vasek Polak Racing Porsche 934

Vasek Polak owned a machine shop in the 1930s and started constructing race engines for motorcycles which he then raced in European enduros. Finding success in motorcycle racing, He won the Czechoslovak 250cc National Championship. In 1947 he moved to automobile racing with a custom built, aluminum bodied Fiat GT race car. When he opened his Hermosa Beach shop in 1958, Polak focused less on driving and more on preparing racing cars and engines for his clientele.

Becoming well known in the sports car racing world, he prepared machines for Jack MacAfee, Ken Miles, Jerry Titus, Roger Penske, Bob Holbert, Jean Behra, Joakim Bonnier, and Wolfgang von Trips. In 1966, Vasek took a Porsche 911 from his dealership inventory and prepared it for racing. With Polak as the entrant, Jerry Titus took the car to the SCCA D Production championship. This was the start of his role as a car owner. As well as this, Polak was asked by Porsche to work on their factory racing team during The 12 Hours of Sebring.

He campaigned a Porsche 917 for the 1971 through the 1974 Can-Am seasons and entered Porsche 934 and Porsche 935 models in the Trans-Am Series. In 1976, George Follmer won the Category 2 Drivers' Championship of the Trans Am series in a Porsche 934 under Vasek Polak Racing.
