= Flat-sixteen engine =

Type of piston engine

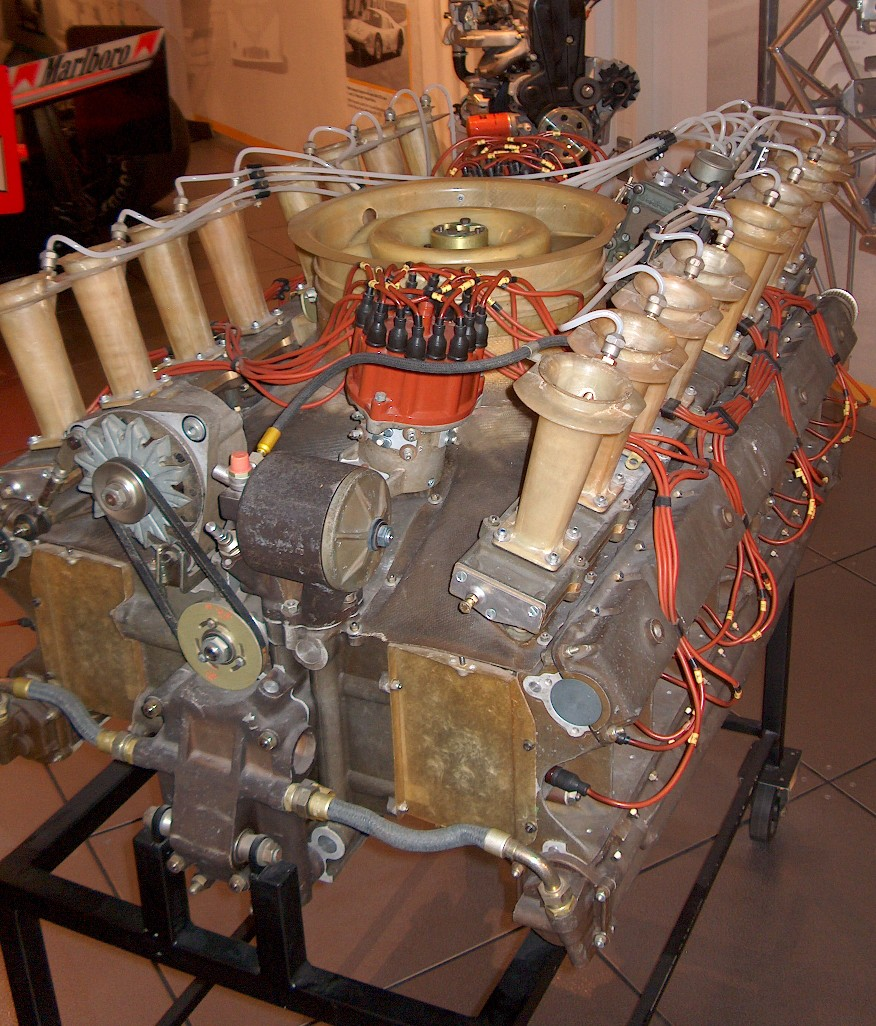
Porsche 917 experimental Can-Am engine

A flat-sixteen engine (also known as a horizontally opposed-sixteen) is a sixteen-cylinder piston engine with eight cylinders on each side of a central crankshaft.

Flat-sixteen engines are less common than V16 engines, with only a few prototype racing engines using a flat-sixteen layout.

== Design ==
These engines had two connecting rods per crankpin, so they could also be referred to as a 180 degree V16, rather than a boxer configuration as used by most flat engines with six cylinders or less.

== Coventry Climax FWMW ==
The Coventry Climax FWMW was a prototype flat-sixteen engine designed between 1963 and 1965 that was intended for use in Formula One. The Brabham and Lotus teams designed cars for this engine but it was never raced. This was due to reliability problems in testing and a failure to generate the desired power output.

== Porsche 917 ==
In 1971, Porsche developed a flat-sixteen prototype engine to use in the Porsche 917 that competed in the Can-Am championship. The project was abandoned and the 1972 Porsche 917/10K was instead powered by a turbocharged version of Porsche's existing flat-twelve engine.

== See also ==
- V16 engine
- W16 engine
