= Noilly Prat =

Brand of French vermouth

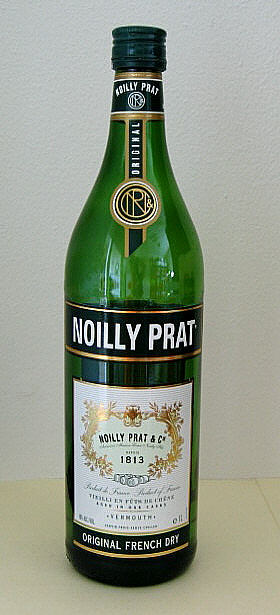
A pre-2009 bottle of Noilly Prat

Noilly Prat (French pronunciation: [nwa.ji pʁat]) is a brand of vermouth from France, owned by the Italian company Martini & Rossi, which is a subsidiary of Bacardi. "White" Noilly Prat is the archetype of dry, straw-coloured French vermouth. Noilly Prat now makes Red and Ambre vermouths as well, introduced in the 1960s and 1980s, but they are less widely known. Noilly Prat Dry is 18% alcohol by volume. The Noilly Prat company is based in Marseillan, in the Hérault département of southern France. Joseph Noilly, a herbalist, developed the first formula in 1813, 50 years before the now archetypal vermouth, Martini.

== History ==
It has long been known that leaving wine in a barrel alters its characteristics. Wine that was transported long distances in barrels and exposed to the weather became darker in colour and fuller-flavoured. It was to mimic this natural process that Joseph Noilly, in 1813, designed a process that made France's first vermouth. In 1855, his son Louis Noilly and son-in-law Claudius Prat set up the company that became Noilly Prat, moving the business to Marseillan where it remains to this day. Between 1865 and 1902, the company was managed by Anne Rosine Noilly-Prat. The brand was acquired by its Italian competitor Martini & Rossi in 1971, which was merged into the Bacardi-Martini family of brands in 1992.

== Manufacturing process ==
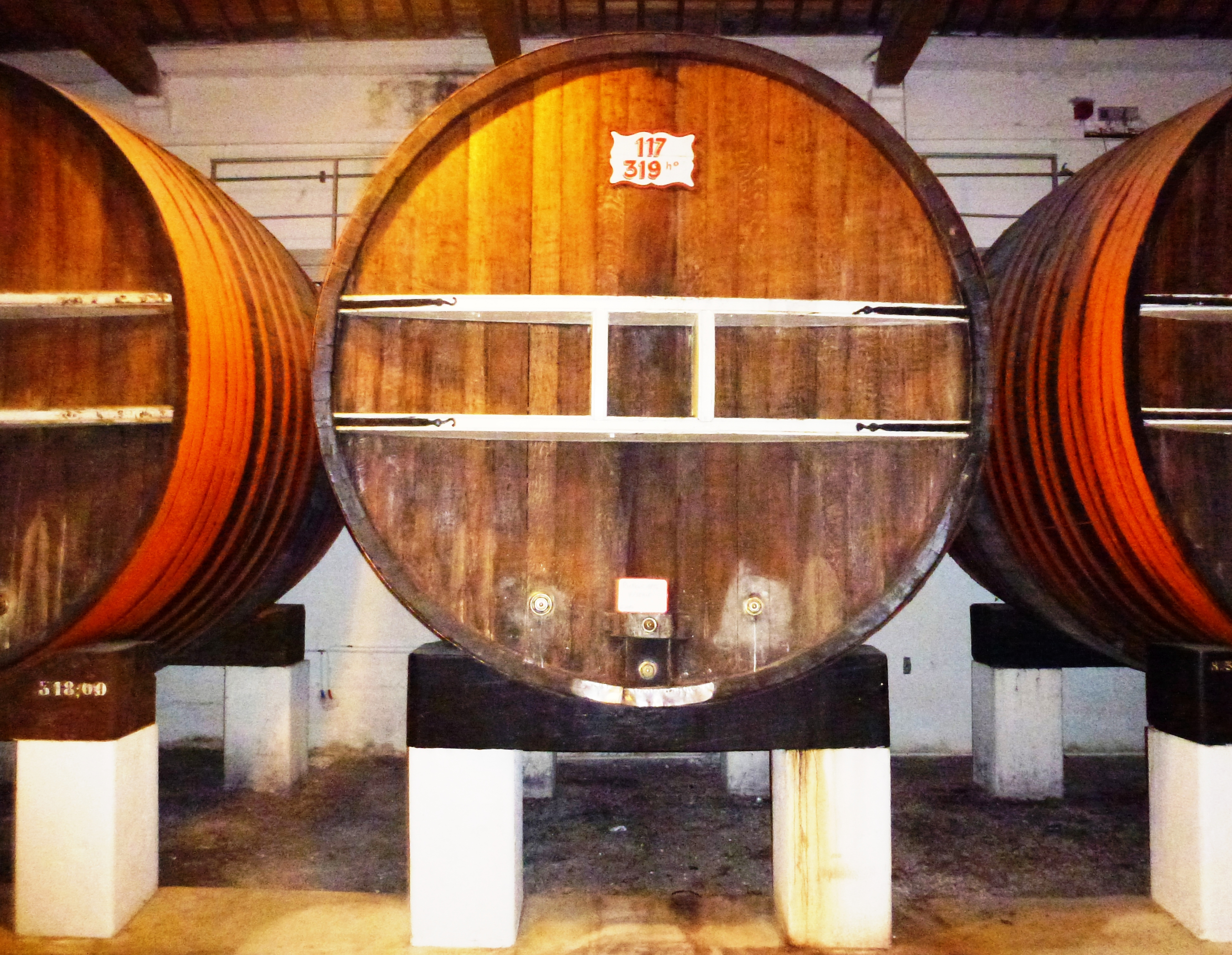
Barrels for maturing the wine

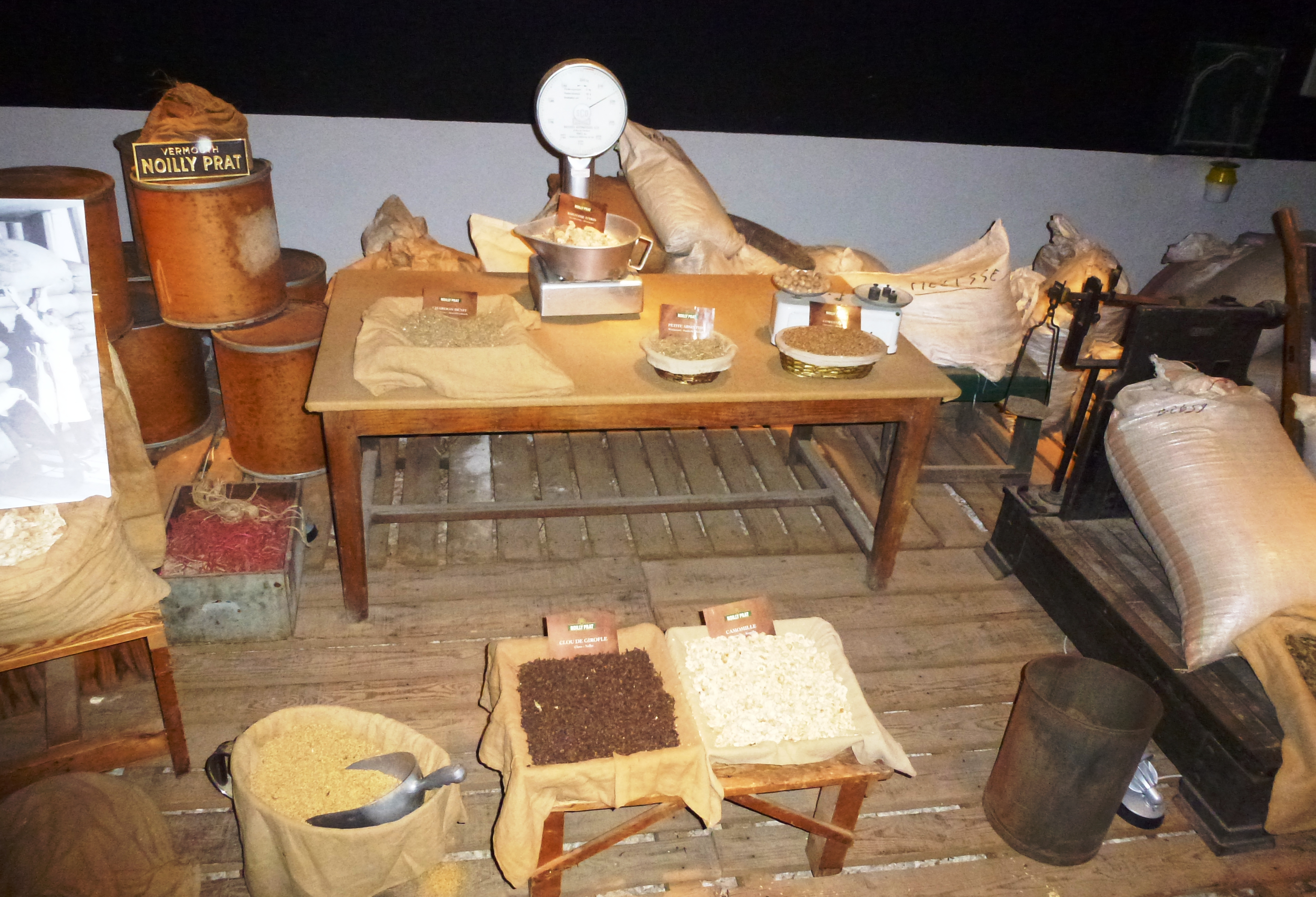
Herbs workshop

The process used today is virtually unchanged since the 1850s. Noilly Prat is made exclusively from white grape varieties grown in the Marseillan area, principally Picpoul de Pinet and Clairette. These produce light, fruity wines which are matured in massive Canadian oak casks inside the original storerooms. The wine stays in these casks for 8 months, maturing and absorbing the flavour of the wood, before being transferred to smaller oak barrels which are taken outside and left for a year. Here they are exposed to the sun, wind, and low winter temperatures, while the wine is slowly changing. The result is a wine that is dry, full-bodied and amber coloured, similar to Madeira or Sherry. During the year outside, 6 to 8% of the volume is lost to evaporation, the "angels' share".

Brought back inside and left to rest for a few months, the wines are then blended together into oak casks. A small quantity of mistelle (grape juice and alcohol) is added to the wines in order to soften them, along with a dash of fruit essence to accentuate their flavour.

In the oak casks, a process of maceration, supposedly unique to Noilly Prat, takes place over a period of three weeks. A blend of some twenty herbs and spices is added by hand every day. The exact mix of herbs and spices that goes into Noilly Prat is a closely guarded secret, but includes camomile, bitter orange peel, nutmeg, centaury (yellow gentian), coriander, and cloves. After a further six weeks, the finished product is ready for bottling and is shipped in tankers to Beaucaire, Gard, where it is bottled by Martini & Rossi.

== Variants ==
The vast bulk of Noilly Prat wine is the Original French Dry vermouth. Three variants are also made:

- Red Noilly Prat is made in the same way, but with the addition of 30 flavourings, which produce the rich red colour. It is not sold in France, except from the Noilly Prat shop in Marseillan, being produced for export, principally to the USA.
- Ambre Noilly Prat is available for purchase from the Noilly Prat shop in Marseillan and specialised stores.
- (Colourless) Extra Dry Noilly Prat is a less complex wine formulated for the American extra-dry martini cocktail. Extra Dry is only shipped to North America, where it was available from 1979 until 2009. It returned late in 2012.

== Cocktails ==
Noilly Prat is often used in cocktails, the most common and well-known of which is probably the martini, consisting of one part Noilly Prat to one or more parts gin or vodka, with a dash of orange bitters, twist of lemon, or olive garnish. Over the years, the American preference for "extra dry" martinis led to the switch from gin to vodka, and to drastically reducing the flavour and quantity of the vermouth employed. However, in 2009, the extra-dry Noilly recipe exported to the USA was replaced by the original dry formula used worldwide. The change in recipe was accompanied by a change in the bottle's design. Some recipes substituted a vermouth from Dolin instead of Noilly Prat for making martinis, which is said to be "every bit as good as, although not by any means identical to, the old Noilly".

The Algonquin cocktail is named for the Algonquin Hotel, which is composed of rye whiskey, Noilly Prat and pineapple juice.

== Cooking with Noilly Prat ==
Noilly Prat is widely used in cooking, and extensively used for sauces, especially to accompany fish. In his BBC TV series French Odyssey, Rick Stein described Noilly Prat as a "true flavour from the Languedoc" and said, "I've done lots of experiments with white wines for fish sauces and I've come to the conclusion that Noilly Prat is the best. The Provençal herbs and spices used to flavour Noilly Prat seem to add flavour to the reduction."

== Visits ==
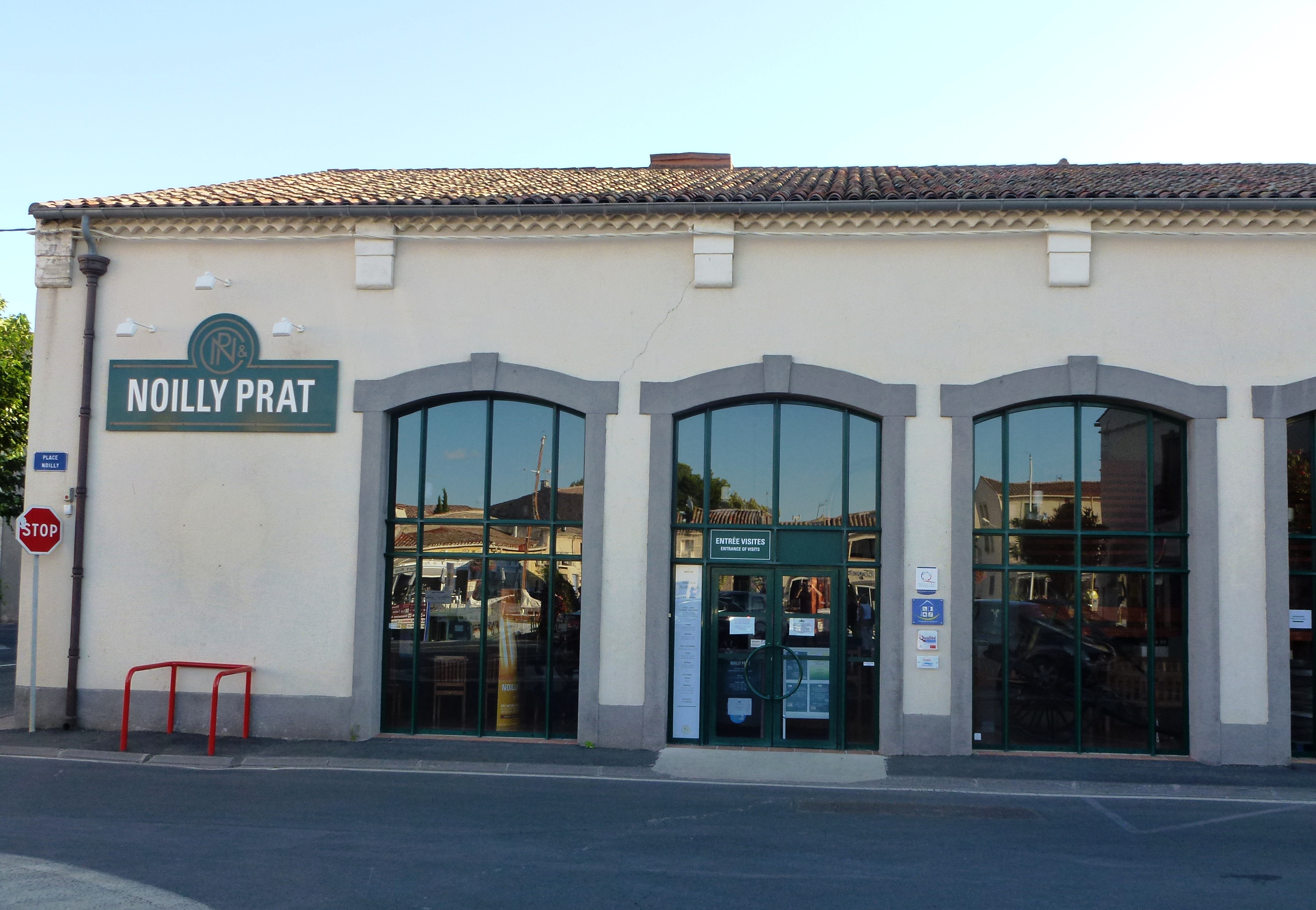
Production site in Marseillan, France

The Noilly Prat cellars are open to the public from March to November, for a small charge. Tours explain the production process, and end with a tasting of the vermouths and cocktails made with them. Noilly Prat attracts more than 80,000 visitors every year.

== Gallery ==
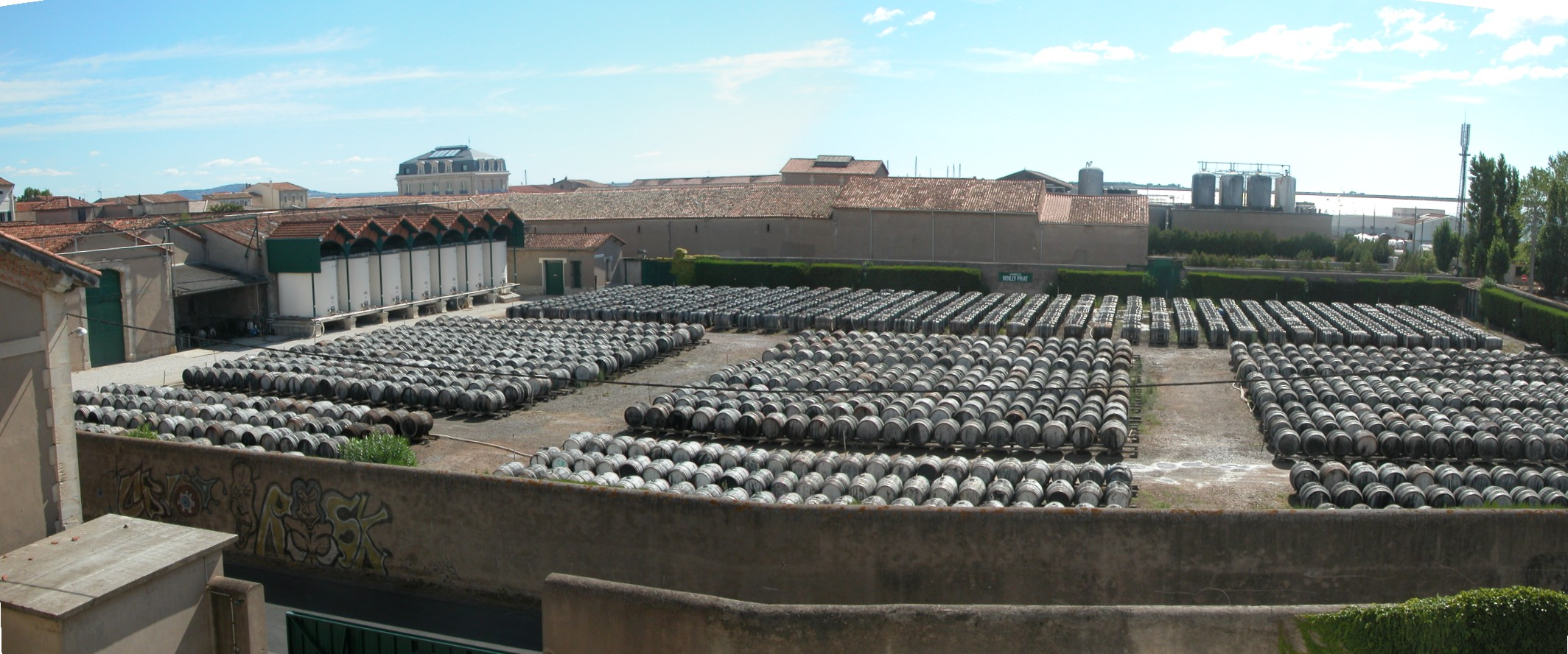
Noilly Prat production area in Marseillan

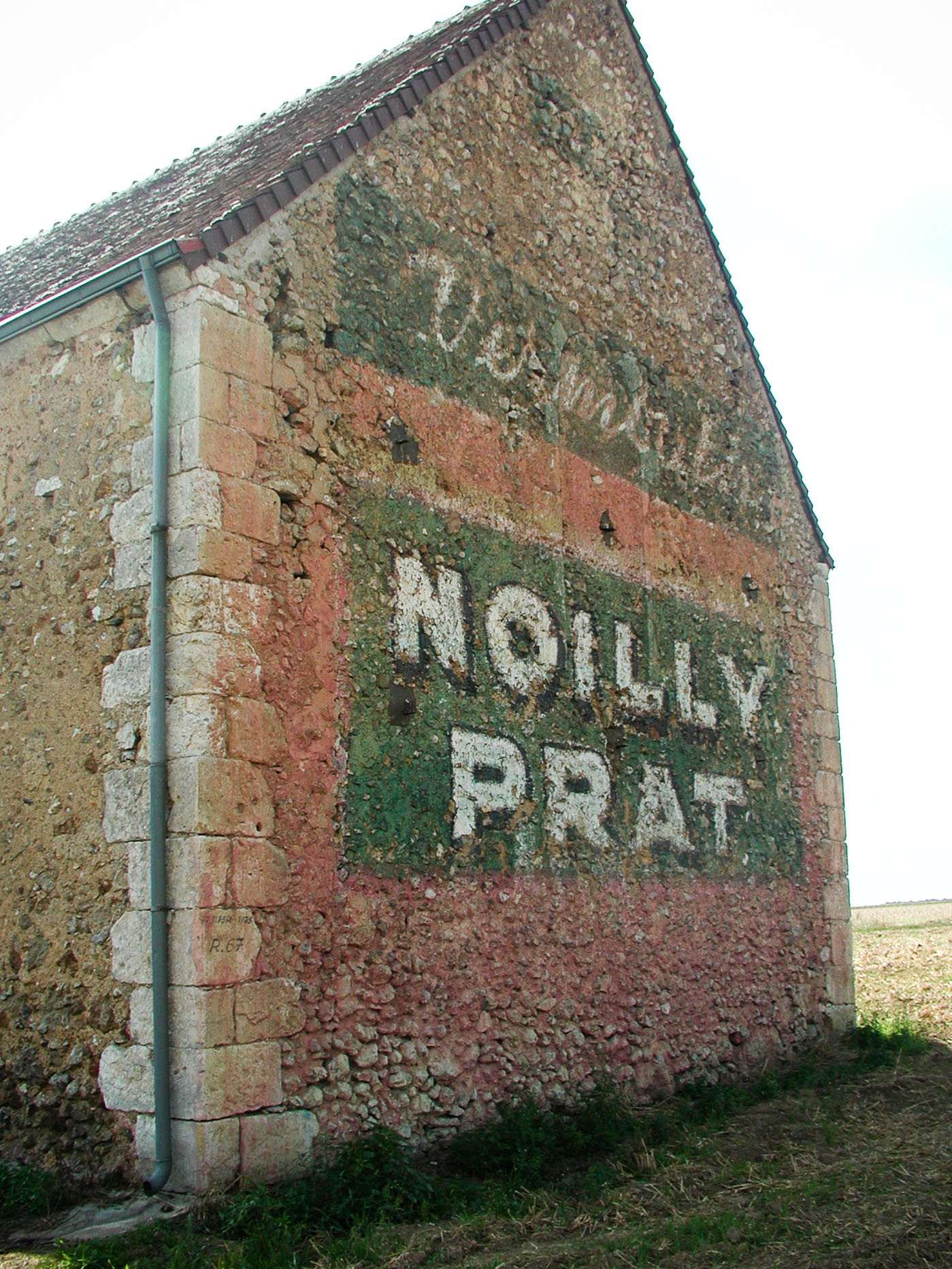
Noilly Prat advertisement near Chartres, France
