= Martini Racing =

Motor racing teams sponsored by Martini & Rossi

1971 Porsche 917 sponsored by Martini & Rossi

Martini Racing was the name for various motor racing teams sponsored by the Italian company Martini & Rossi, a distillery that produces Martini vermouth in Turin.

Martini's sponsorship program began in 1958 as Martini International Club, founded by Count Metello Rossi di Montelera of Martini & Rossi. The race cars were marked with the distinctive dark blue, light blue and red stripes mostly on white or silver background body cars, but also red or green ones.

== Beginnings ==
Martini's first sponsorship program happened at the Daytona 3 hours in 1962 with two Alfa Romeo Giulietta SZ Coda Troncas, but they had no Martini stickers or logos on them, only "Martini & Rossi Racing Team" written along the front quarter panels.

The two key individuals at the start of Martini Racing's grand adventure were Paul Goppert, head of publicity and public relations for Martini Germany, and his close friend Hans-Dieter Dechent (1940-2014), a racing driver specializing in endurance racing who ran his father's Opel dealership in Saarbrücken, Germany.

At the start of 1968, advertising unrelated to racing was permitted for the first time on the bodywork of racing cars. Paul asked Hans-Dieter to place a few stickers on his car in exchange for overalls and similar equipment.

Martini stickers then appeared, in April 1968 on the Porsche 910 raced by Scuderia Lufthansa Racing Team set up by Robert Huhn, an executive manager of the German airline.

As Dechent wanted to race the sooner with its new car, the car's first appearance of 910-023 in its silver livery with front Lufthansa colors and Martini stickers was at Eberbach-Schwanheim hill climb, the 28 April with n° 174. Then the same car appeared at Dijon-Longvic GP on the fifth of May (Nr 10) where it made 2nd just behind the Ford-powered Matra MS630, then at Paris GP on May 12 (Nr 26) where it renewed its 2nd place and mostly known at the 1000 km of Nürburgring on May 19 (Nr 24). Later in a minor event at the Hockenheimring on 21 July 1968 it did not finish (Nr 13).

In the 1969 World Sportscar Championship, Dechent raced as German BG Racing Team, entering two Porsche 907 in several sports car races to back up the factory effort. The front of the cars were painted in two different colors.

By late 1969, Porsche had two dozens of the Porsche 917, and was looking to sell or race them. For twisty tracks, they also developed a third version of the Porsche 908, the /03, with the 1969-spec Porsche 908/02 "Flunder" given to privateers.

== Martini Porsche ==
=== 1970 ===
The Martini brand came to prominence in the 1970 World Sportscar Championship, when the team of Hans-Dieter Dechent entered as "International Martini Racing Team", with several chassis of Porsche 908/02, mostly white, fenders painted yellow and red, separated by a black belt with Martini logo. At the 1000 km Nürburgring, Gérard Larrousse/Helmut Marko and Rudi Lins/Willi Kauhsen finished 5th and 6th.

For the 1970 24 Hours of Le Mans, Porsche had updated the original long tail version of the Porsche 917, but there was low interest in racing it. The main factory team, Gulf Racing-sponsored JWA, preferred the 917K. The other factory team, Porsche Salzburg or Porsche Konstruktionen K.G., entered a 917K (the eventual winner) and only one 917L, which qualified first. As more or less a third factory entry, another 917L (chassis 043) found its way to Dechent and was painted blue with green swirls (courtesy of Anatole Lapine), some Martini logos, and a large #3. Larrousse/Kauhsen qualified the Hippie car 12th, best of all cars that still ran at the end, and finished 2nd. The Lins/Marko #27 908/02 came home 3rd.

Martini entered another Hippie car in the 1970 Watkins Glen 6 Hours, but this time with #35 on a 917K. It was the repaired chassis 021->012, rented from AAW).

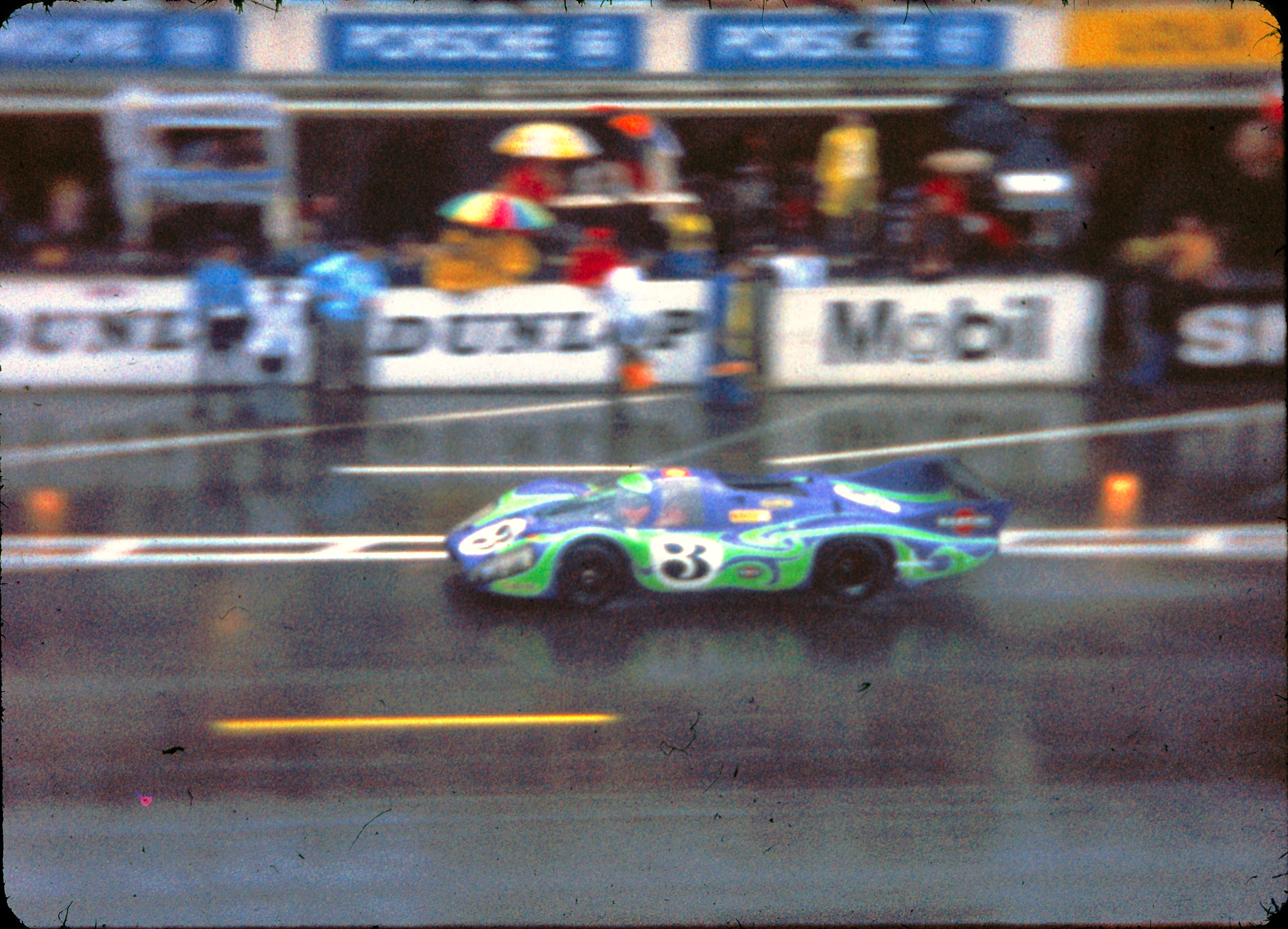
#3 Martini 917L racing in the wet 1970 Le Mans

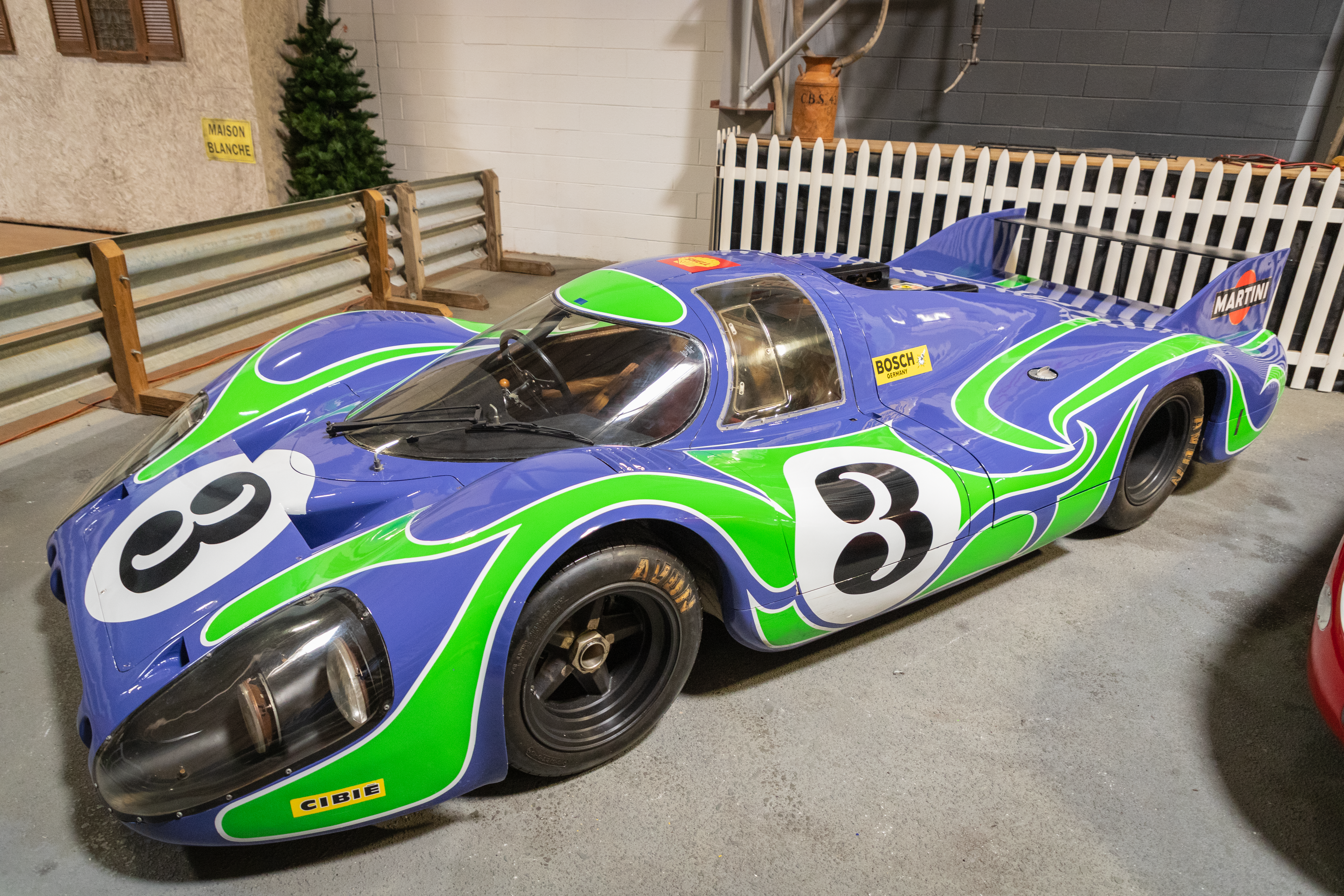
The "Hippie-car" finished second

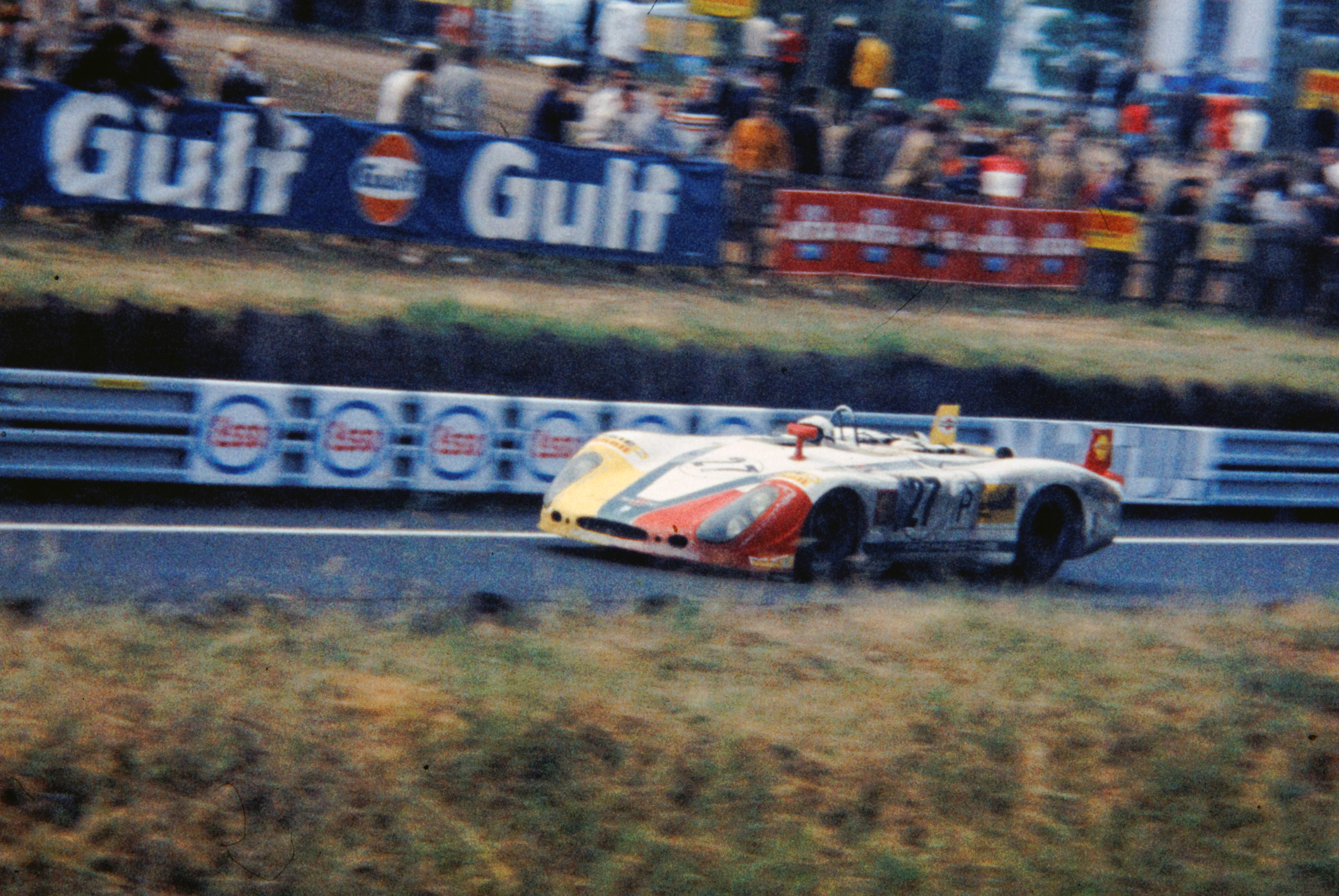
#27 Martini 908/02 racing at Le Mans '70, finishing 3rd

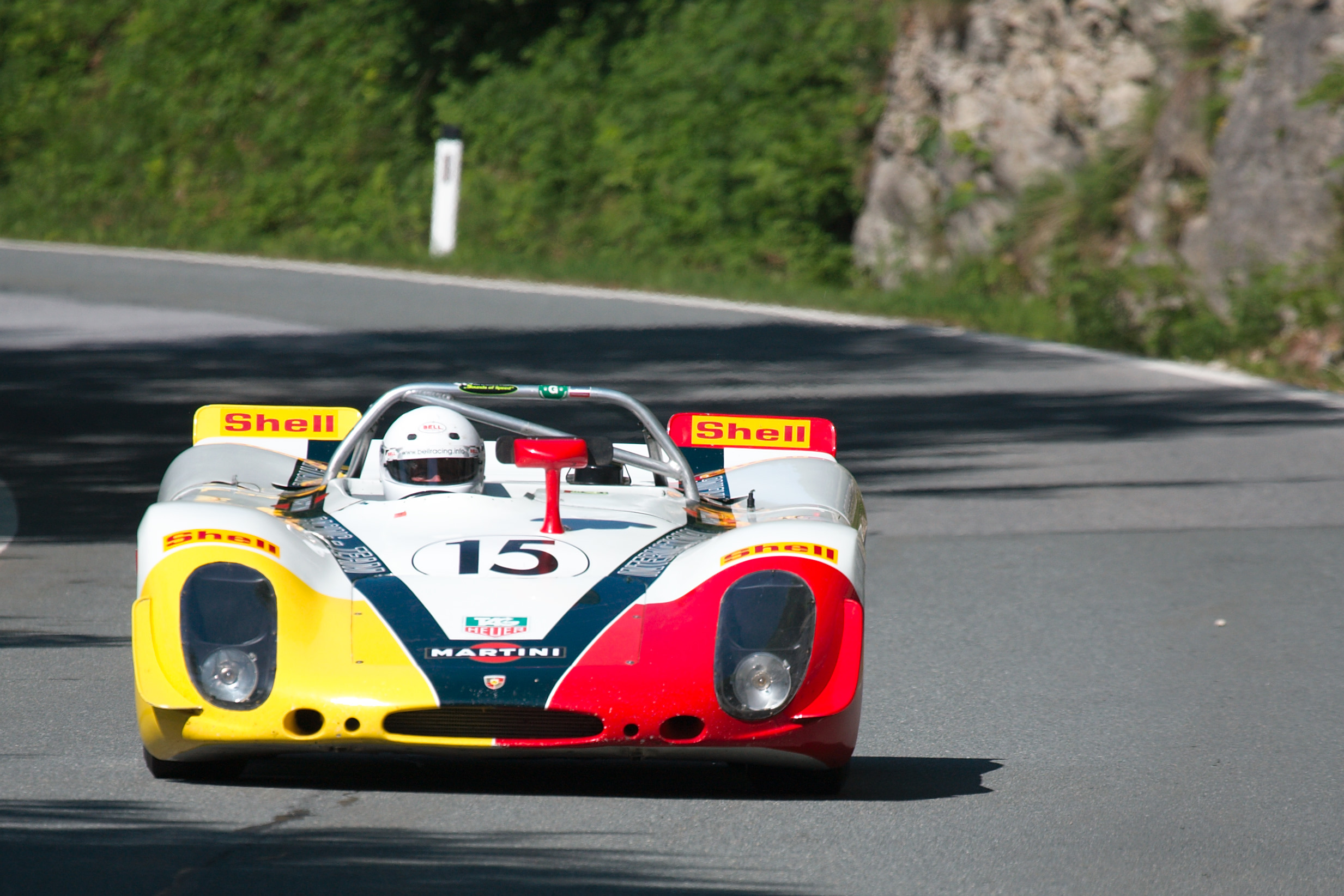
Martini Porsche 908/02 in 2009

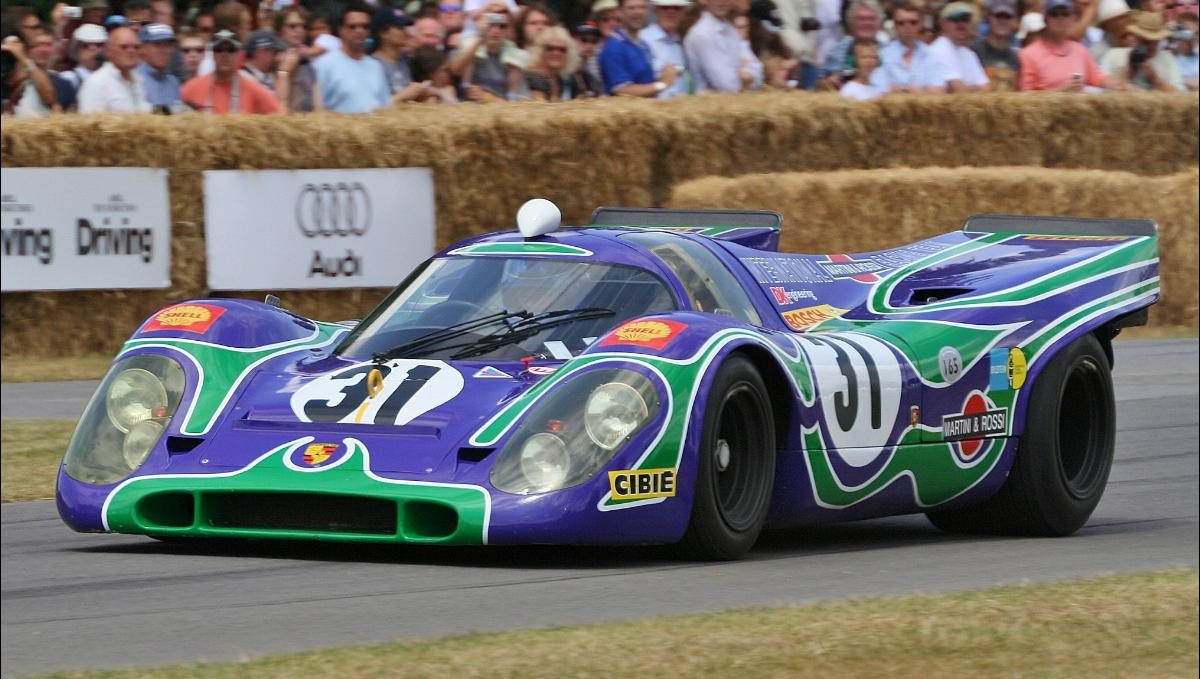
Hippie livery on a 917K, but the Watkins Glen entry had #35

=== 1971 and later ===
For the 1971 World Sportscar Championship, Gulf-Wyer remained as prime factory team, but the resources of Porsche Salzburg were moved to Martini International Racing. The team entered two cars in varying Martini liveries, mostly the mighty Porsche 917, but also the nimble Porsche 908/3 on twisty tracks like Targa Florio and 1000km Nürburgring.

During the 1970s, Martini became famous in connection with Porsche in motorsport, sponsoring the works Porsche 917 that won the 1971 24 Hours of Le Mans.

In 1973, Martini sponsored the Porsche 911 Carrera RSR that won the Targa Florio.

The Martini Porsche cars won Le Mans once more in 1976 and 1977 with Porsche 936, as well as in many other events in the 1970s for the factory Porsche team, with the RSR Turbo, 935 and 936. In 1978, Martini only sponsored the works team in Le Mans, while in 1980 they were associated with Joest Racing, once more only at Le Mans.

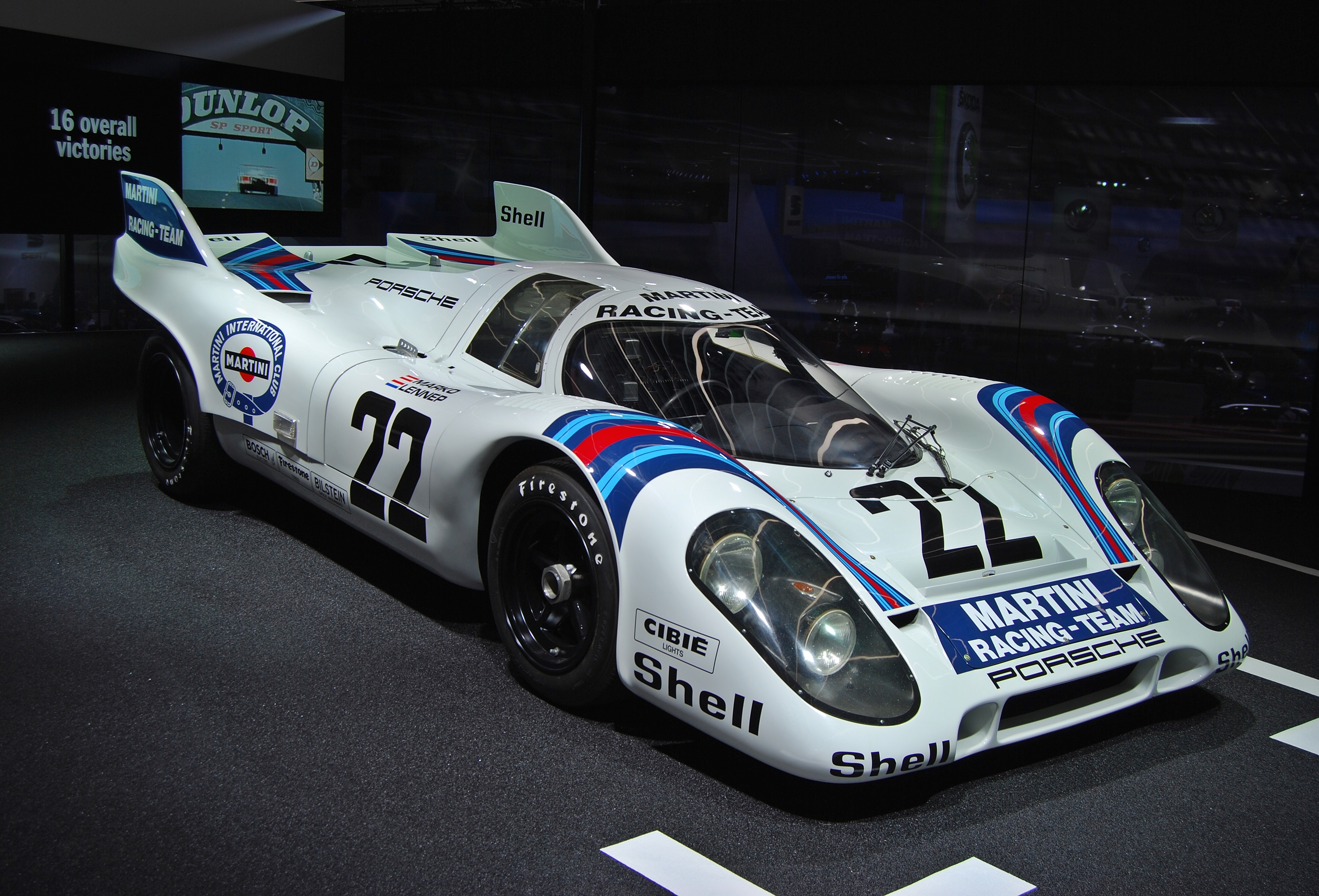
'71 Le Mans winning #22 Martini-Porsche 917K of Marko/Lennep

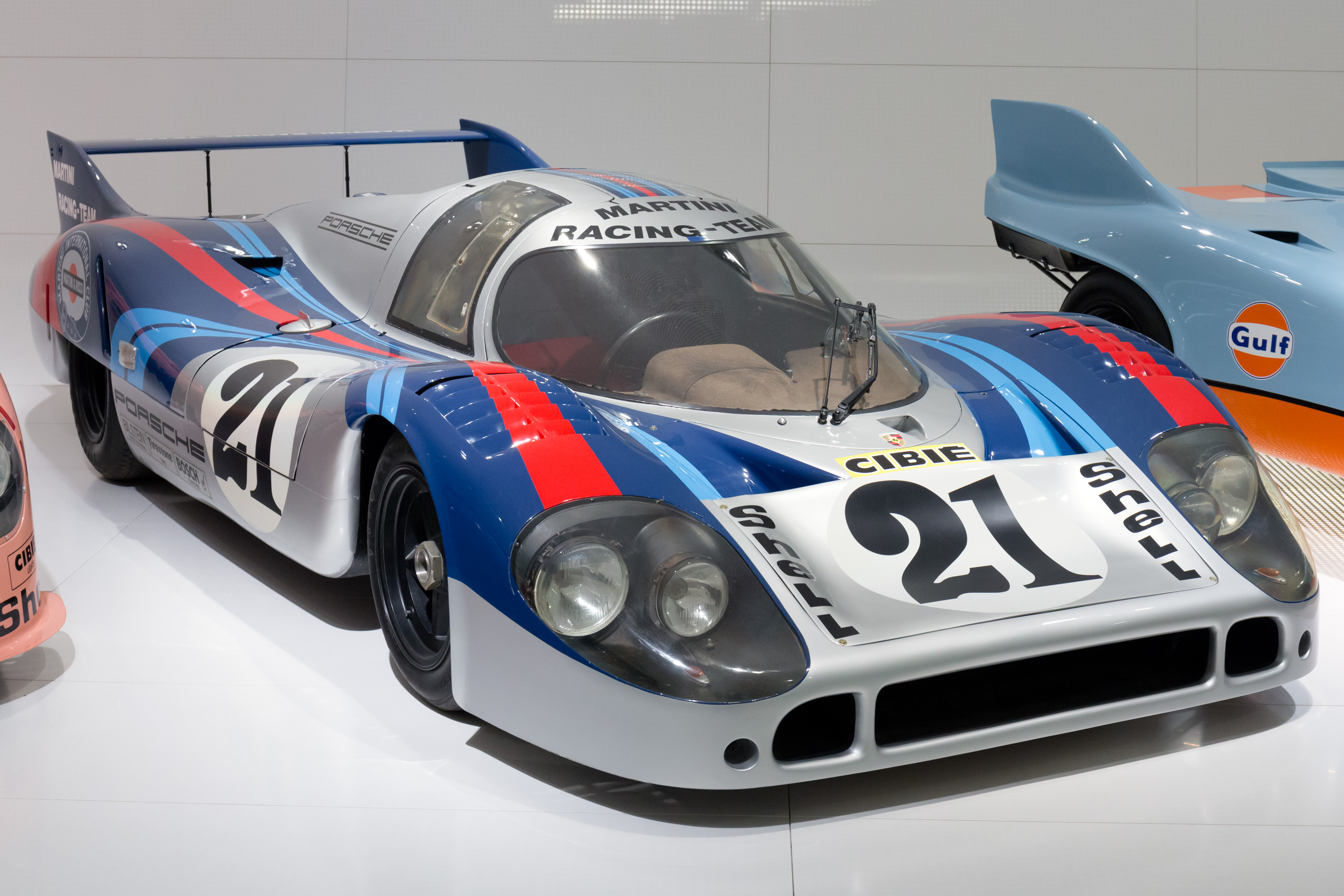
The #21 Martini Langheck-917 did not finish

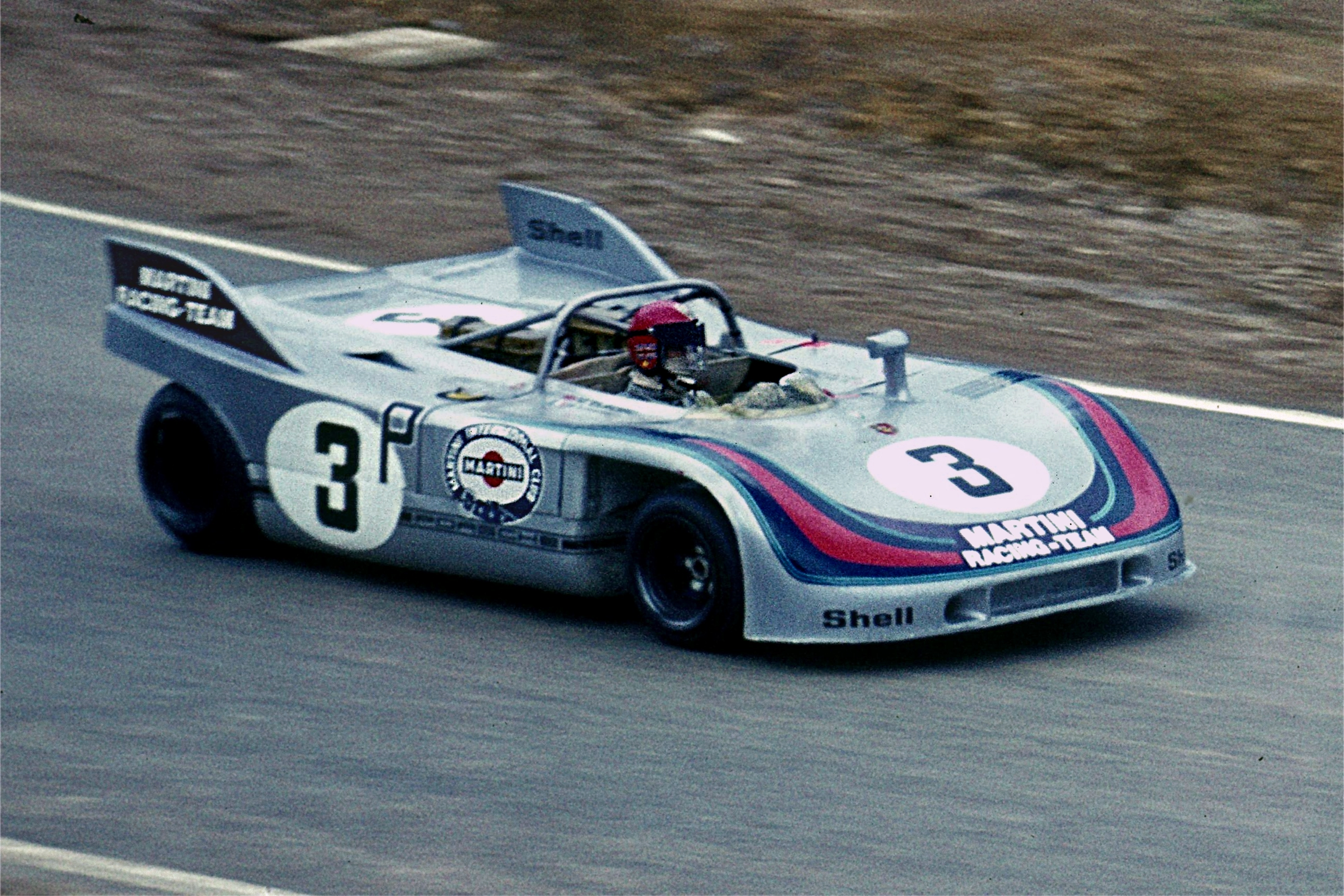
Vic Elford, Nürburgring 1971, Porsche 908

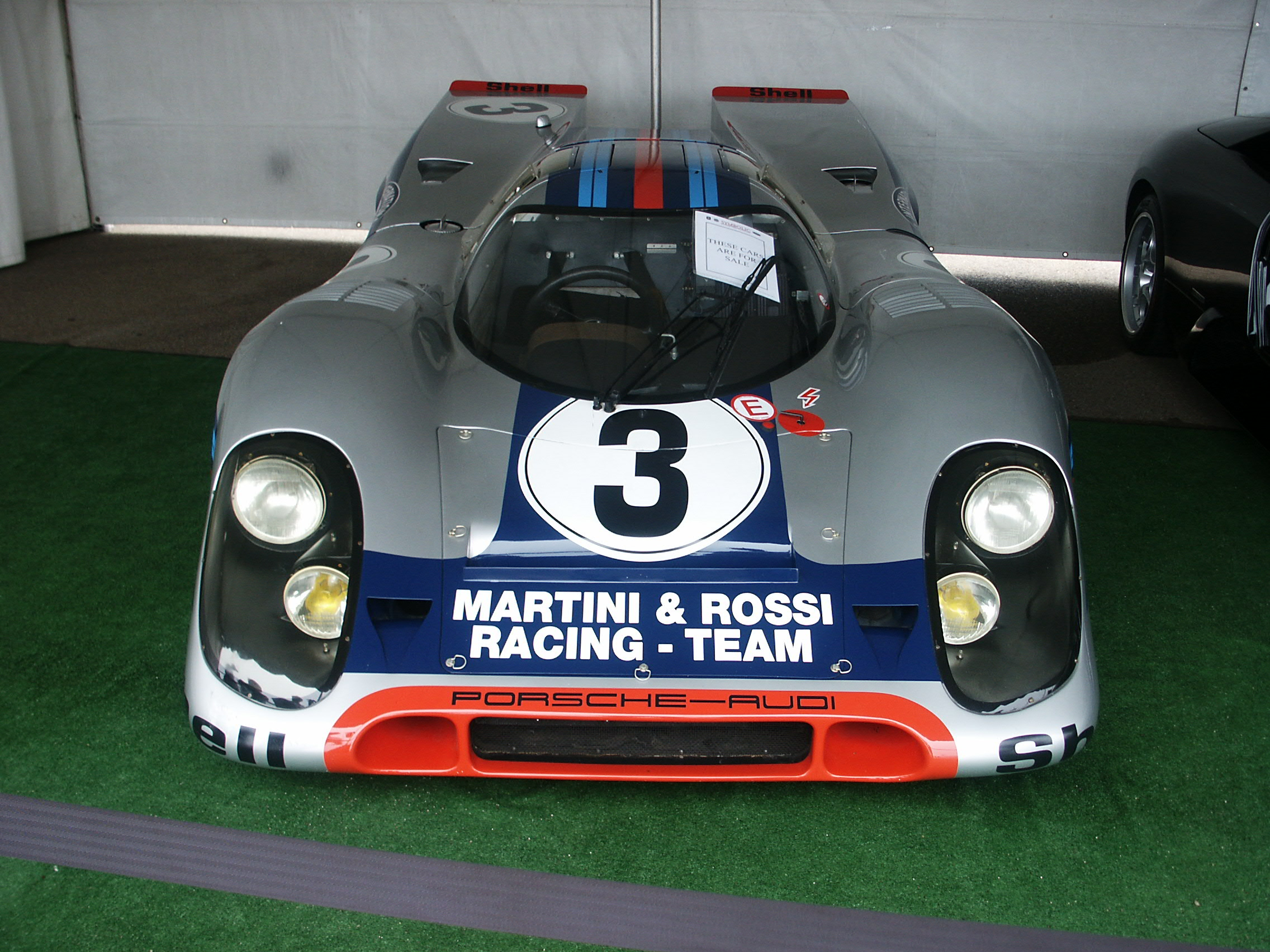
Winner of 1971 Sebring

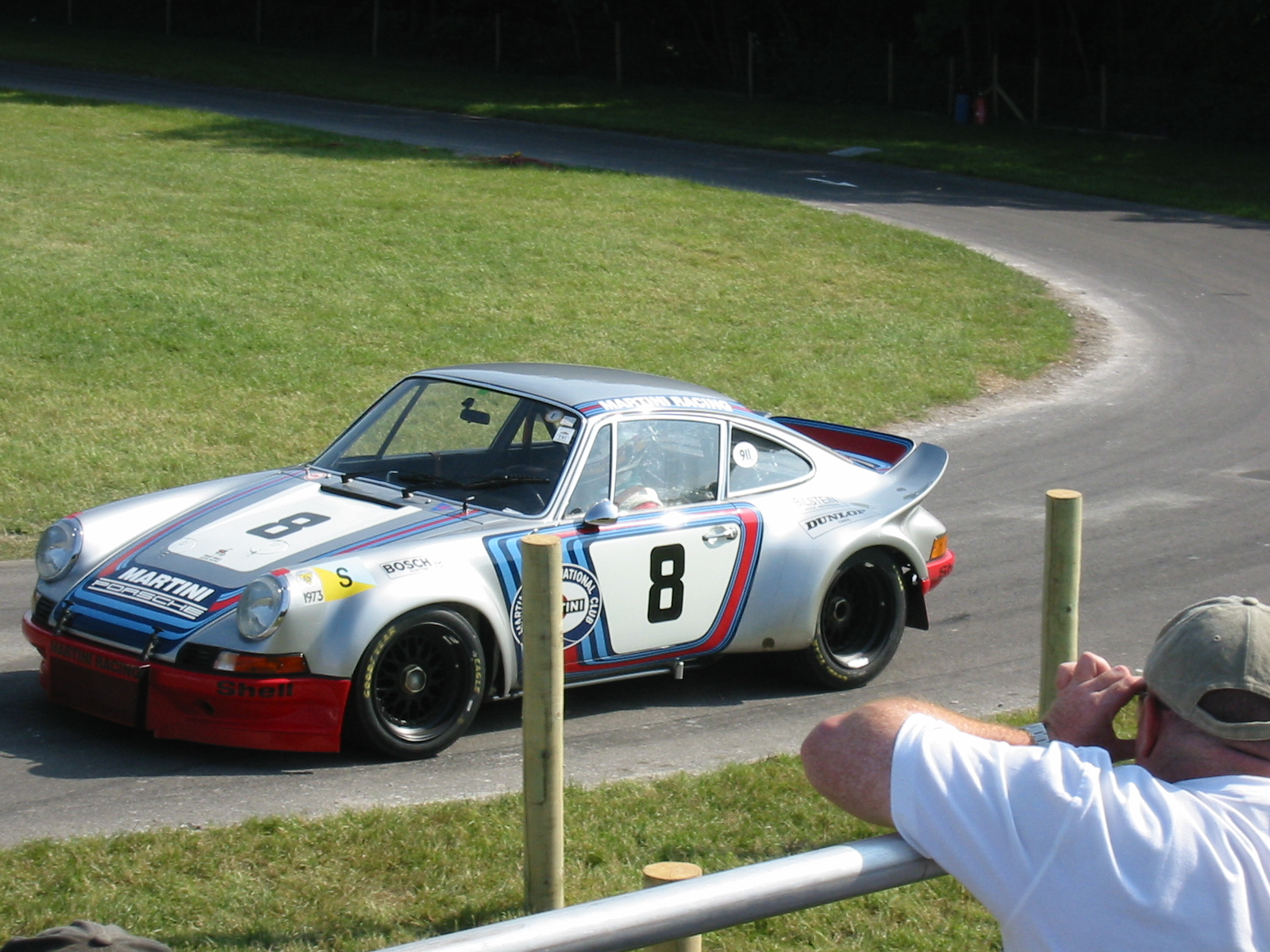
1973 Targa Florio winner

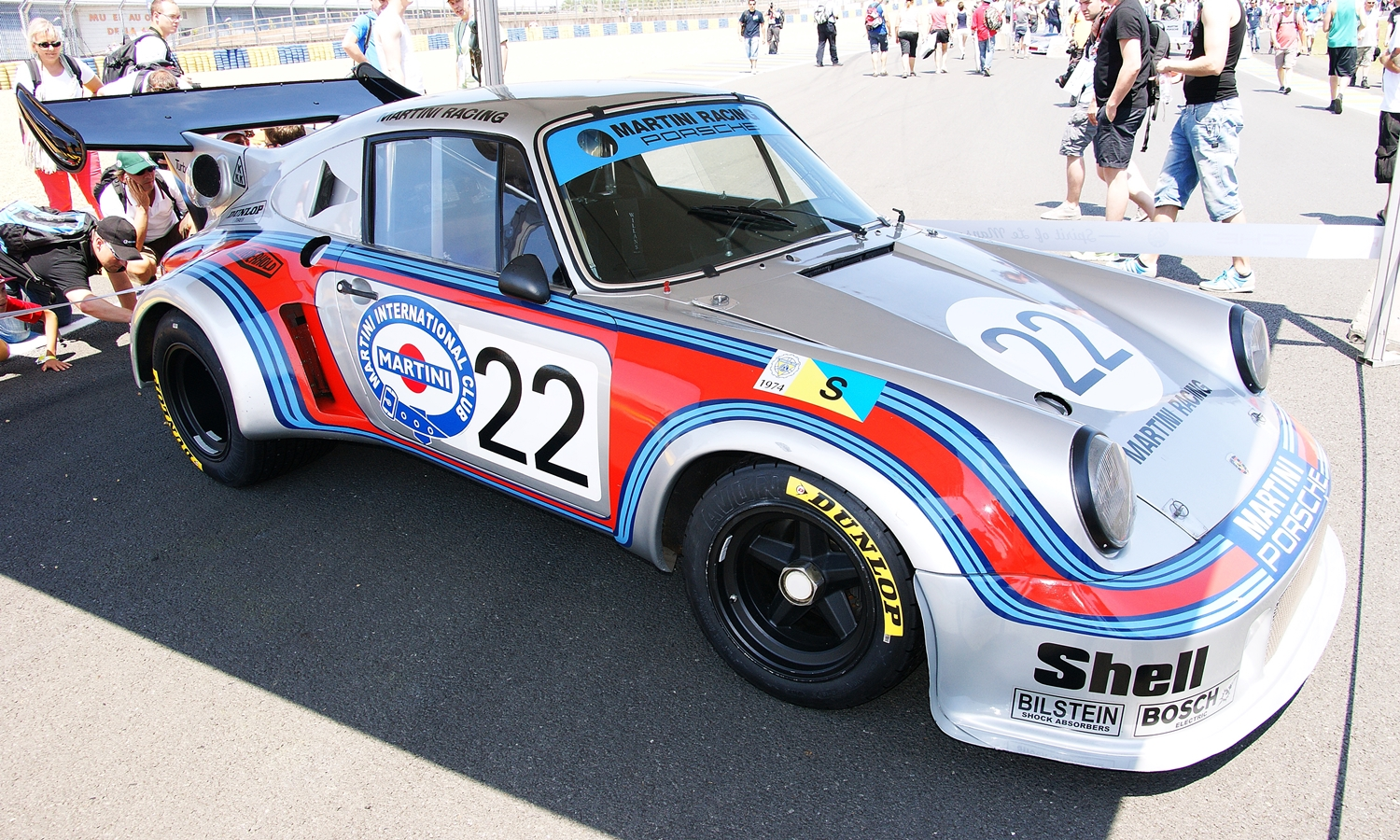
1974 Turbo

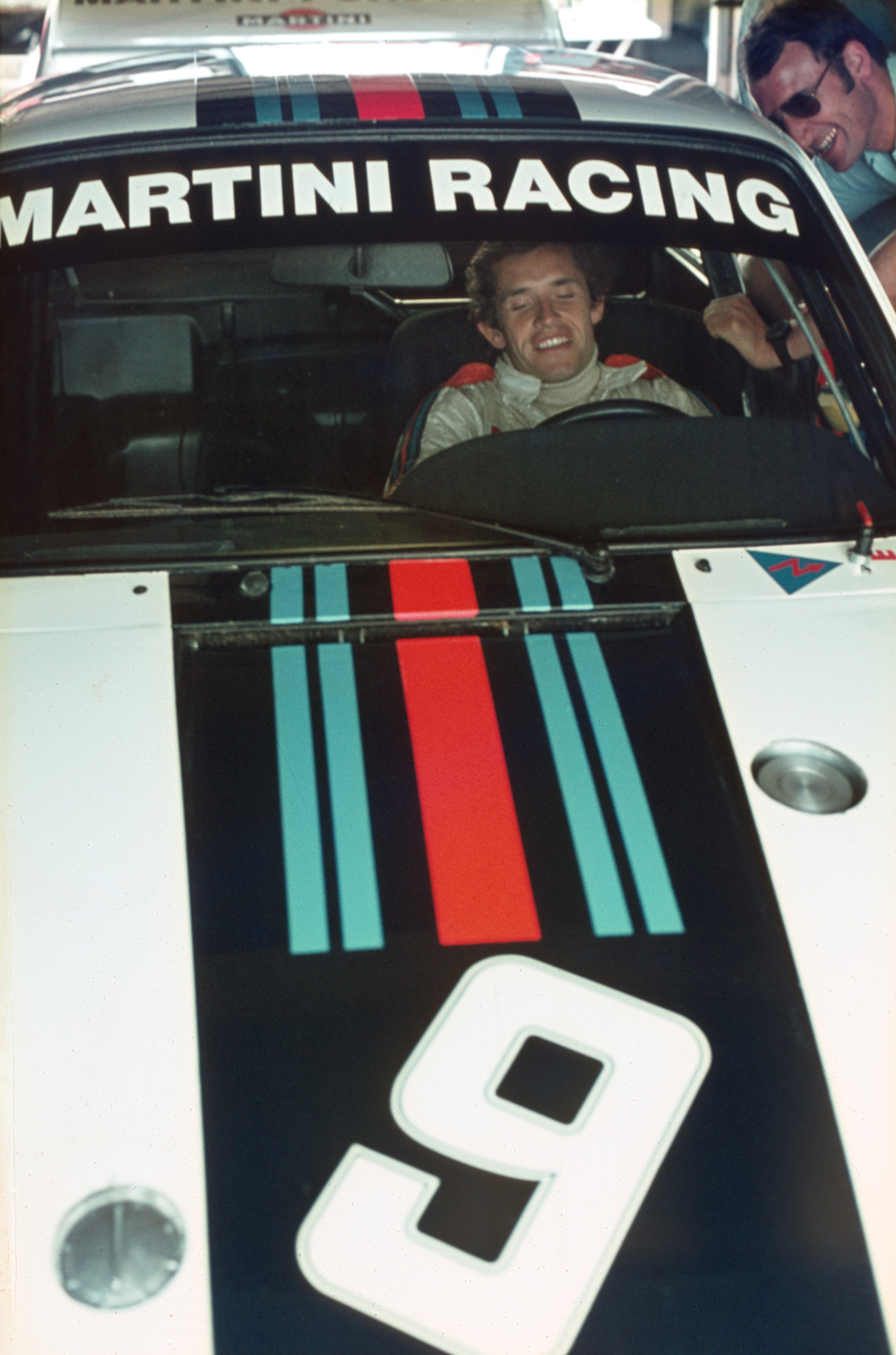
Ickx in the Porsche 935, Silverstone '76

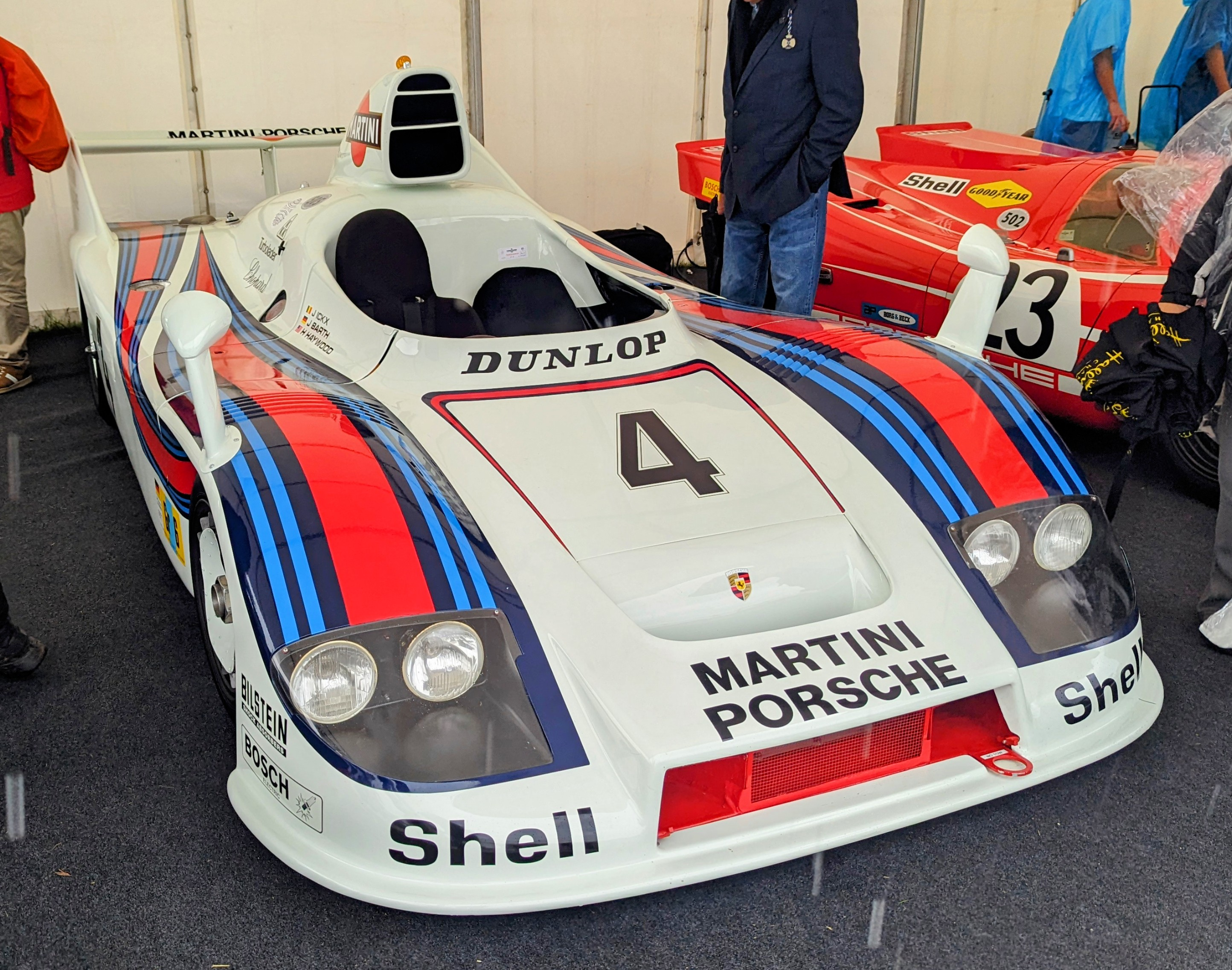
Porsche 936, 1976

== Martini Lancia ==
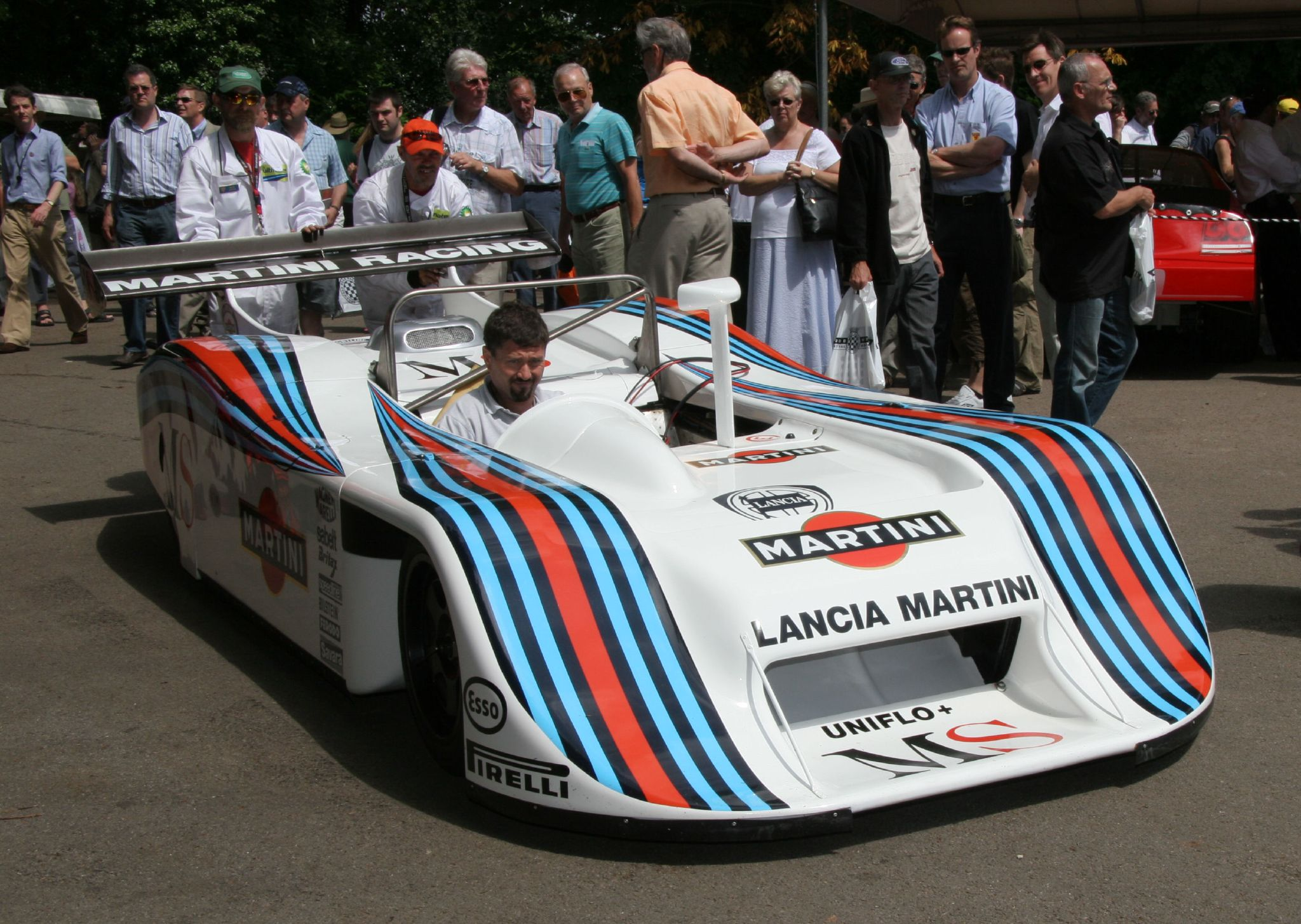
Lancia LC1 1982

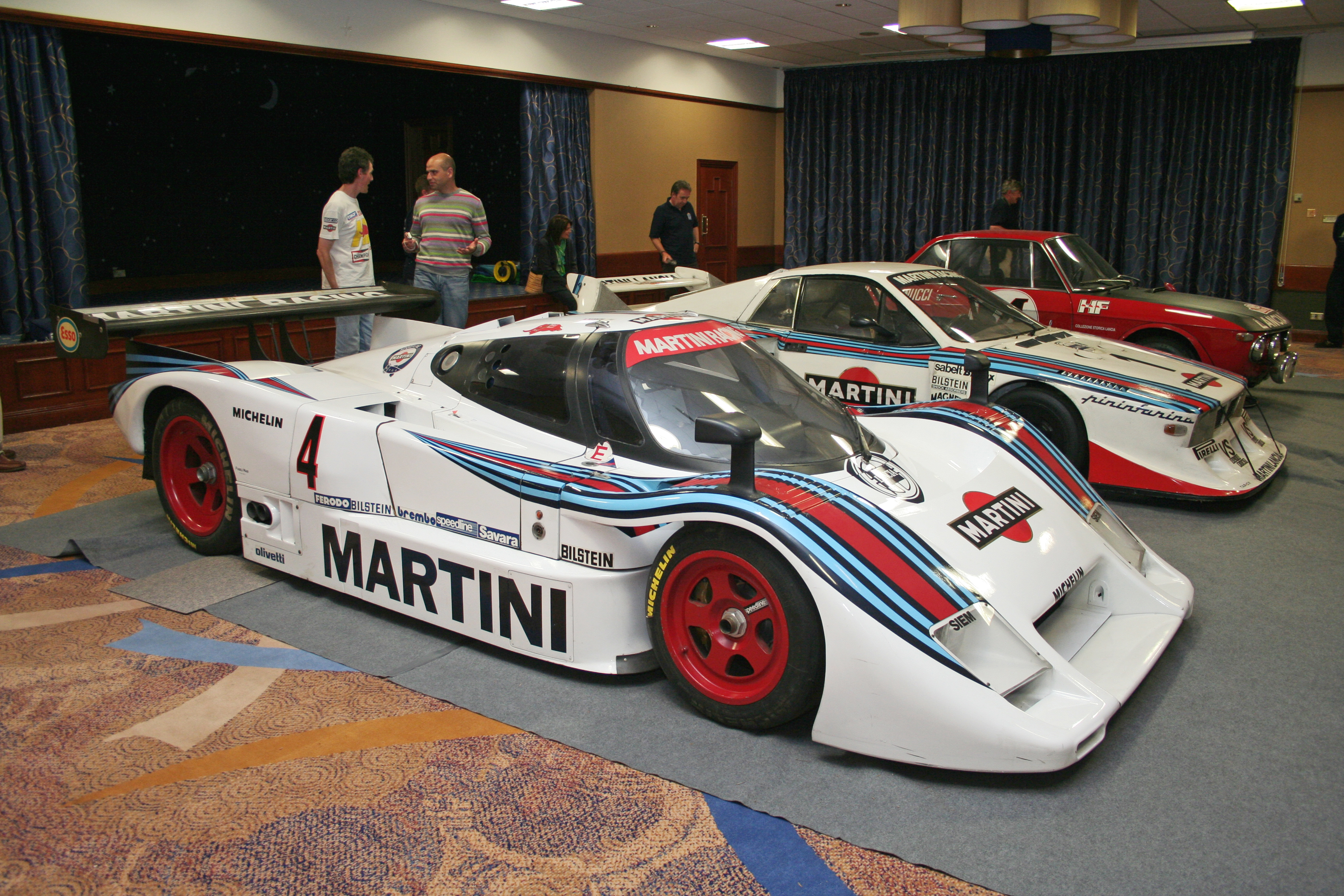
Lancia LC2 racing car (front) in the colours of Martini Racing

In 1981, Martini Racing supported the Italian Lancia effort in sports car racing with the Group 5 Lancia Monte Carlo, Group 6 Lancia LC1 and Group C Lancia LC2. The works Lancia Martini drivers lineup included several contemporary Formula One racers, including Michele Alboreto, Teo Fabi and Riccardo Patrese. The association lasted until the 1986 24 Hours of Le Mans, but by then, Lancia was more involved with rallying. After that, Martini Racing has made only brief entries in sports car racing, including three seasons in the FIA Sportscar Championship with Gianni Giudici's Picchio.

== Formula One ==
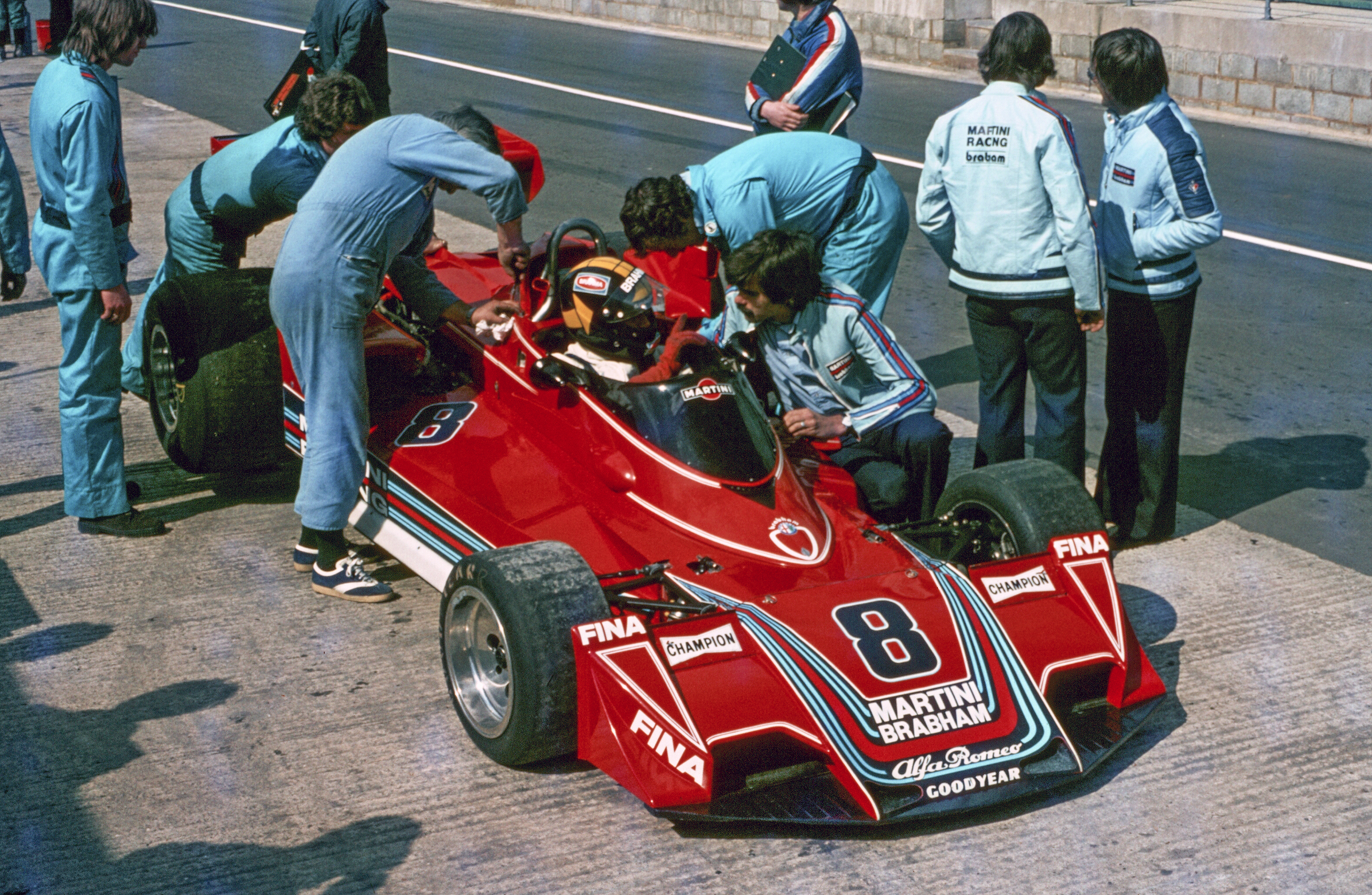
An Alfa Romeo-Brabham BT45 Formula One car in red Martini & Rossi livery.

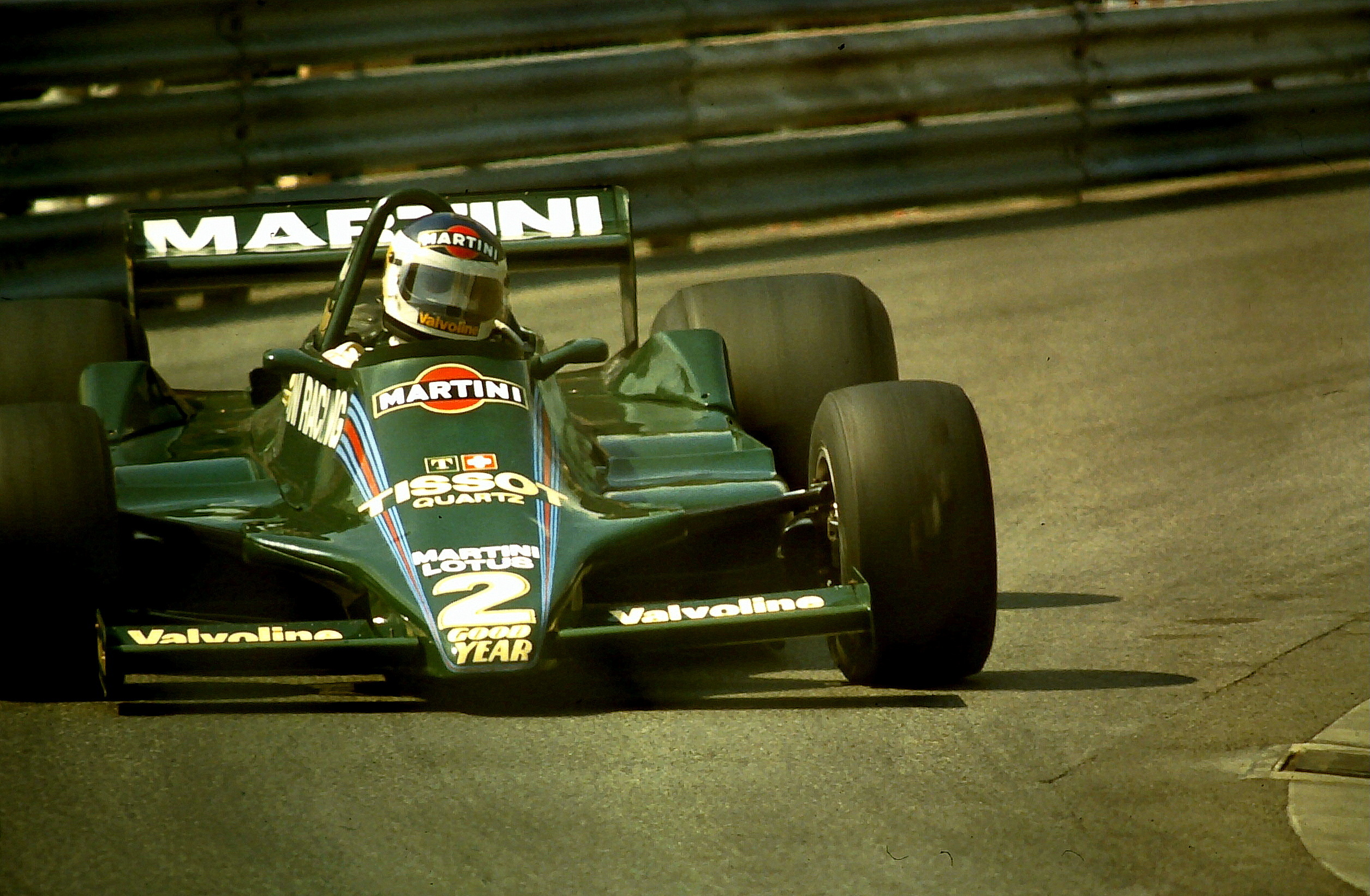
Carlos Reutemann in his Martini livered Lotus 79 at the 1979 Monaco Grand Prix

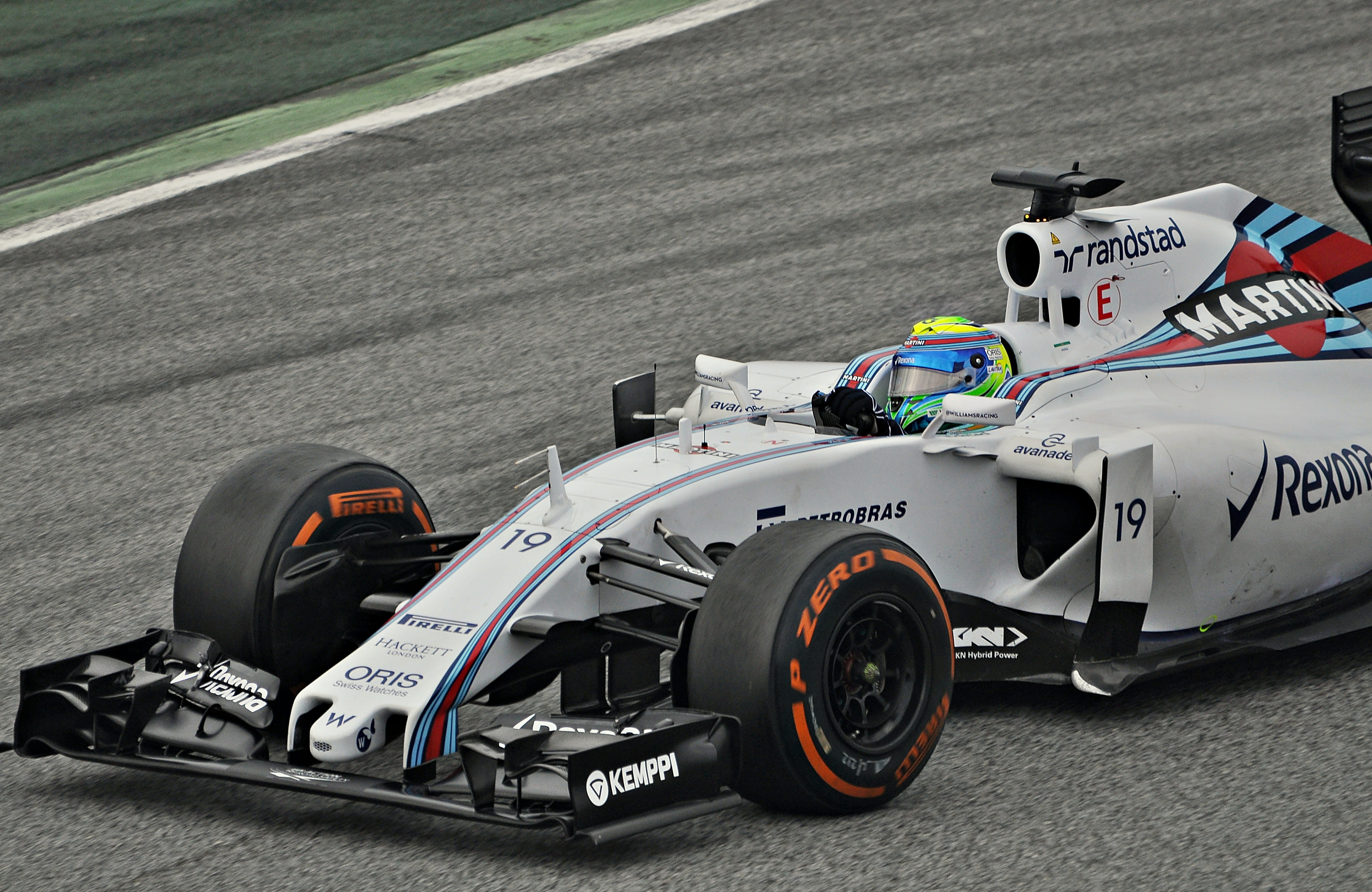
Williams F1 Martini Racing (Felipe Massa, 2015)

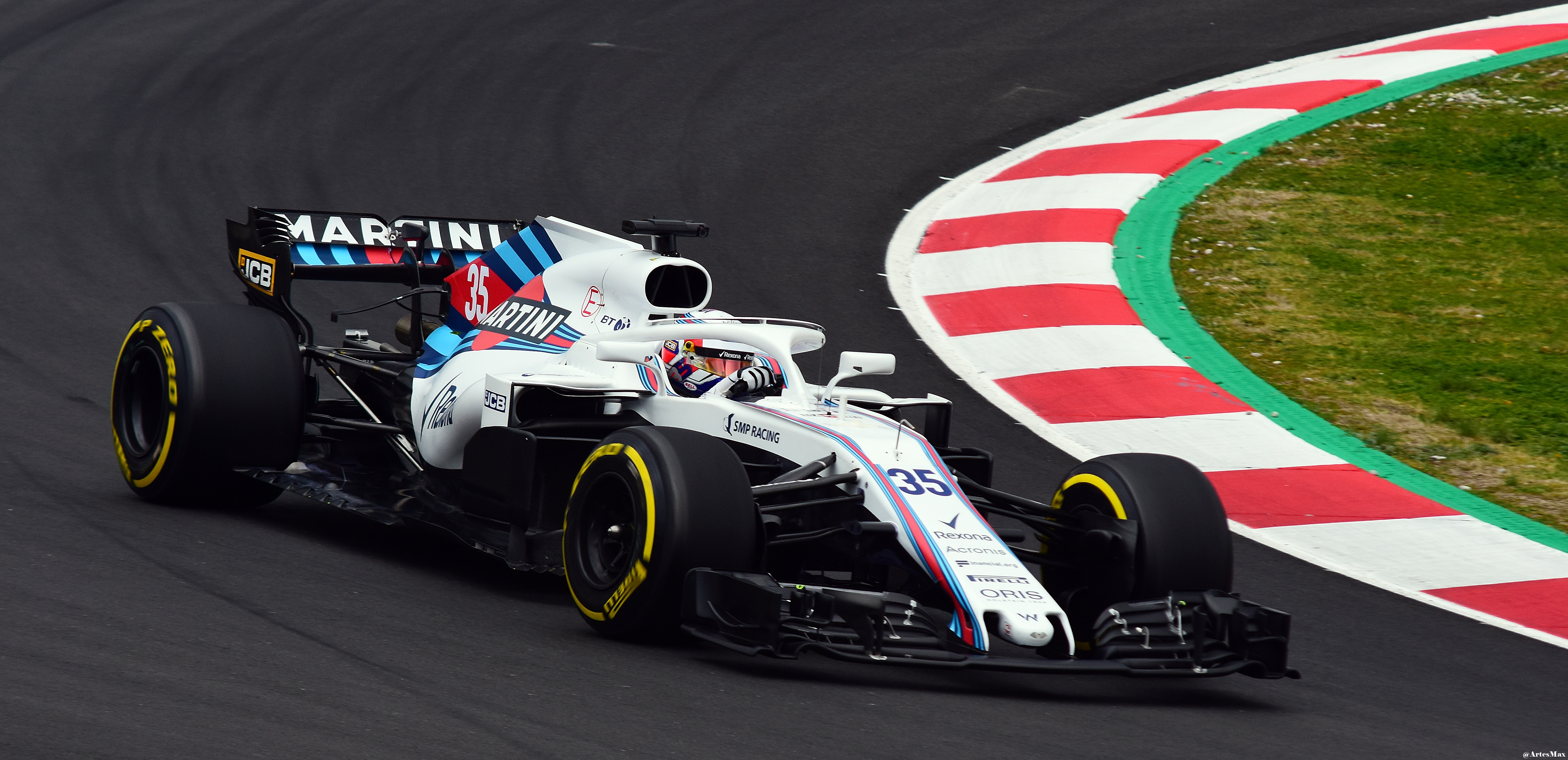
Williams F1 Martini Racing Testing (2018)

Martini Racing's association with Formula One began in 1972 with the Italian team Tecno. However, disagreements between Rossi and the team owners over technical and sporting directions, resulted in an uncompetitive car and Martini withdrew its support to the program after an unsuccessful 1972 and 1973 season.

Martini returned full-time in 1975, sponsoring Bernie Ecclestone's Brabham team. The initial colour scheme incorporated the Martini colours on a white background on the Ford-Cosworth powered Brabham BT44B in 1975.

When the Alfa Romeo flat-V12 powered Brabham BT45 and Brabham BT45B were used for the 1976 and 1977 seasons, the main color was shifted to the traditional Italian red racing rosso corsa background. Drivers such as Carlos Reutemann, Carlos Pace, Hans-Joachim Stuck and John Watson all drove for the team during this time.

For the 1979 season, the Martini sponsorship moved to Team Lotus. In spite of having the 1978 championship winning Lotus 79 and Mario Andretti and Carlos Reutemann as drivers, the Martini Lotus association did not achieve a single win and by the end of the year, Martini withdrew from F1 once more.

After a long break from the category, the Italian company began sponsoring Scuderia Ferrari in 2006 with a minor presence.

Williams Grand Prix Engineering announced a partnership with Martini beginning with the 2014 season, and continued their sponsorship by Martini into the 2015, 2016, 2017, and 2018 seasons. This partnership ended after the 2018 season.

== Rallying ==
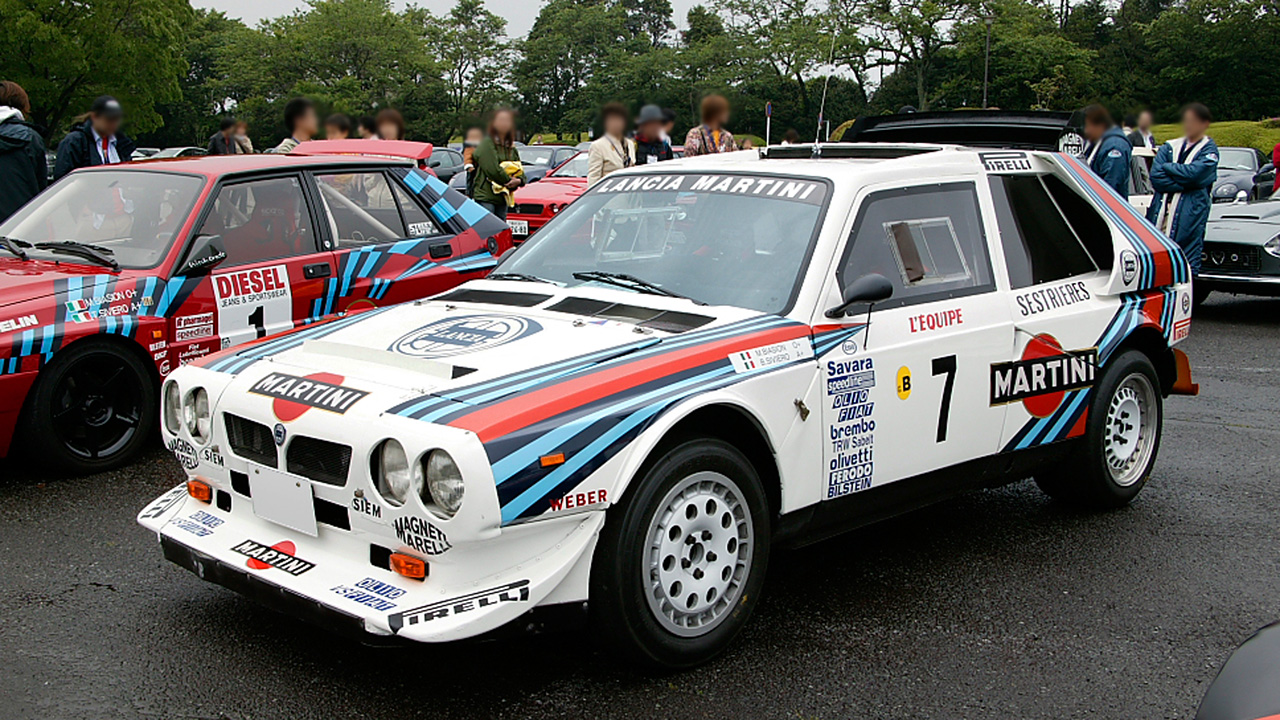
Lancia Delta S4

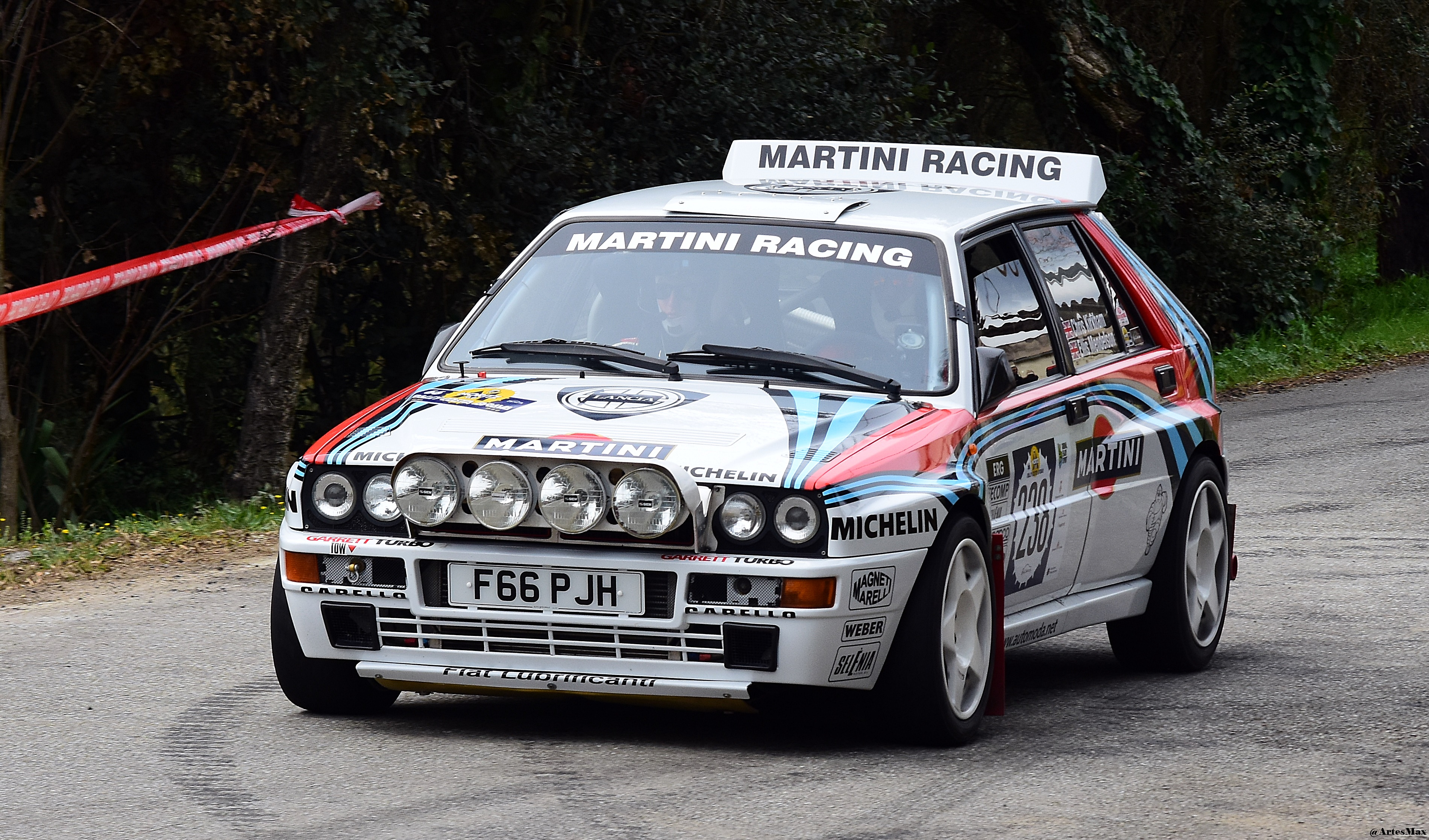
A Lancia Delta Integrale HF 16V driven at the 2018 Rally Moritz Costa Brava

Martini's first rally challenge was taken up by usual stalwart Porsche. In 1978, Porsche made a return to the World Rally Championship as a works team, running a 911 SC for Björn Waldegård and Vic Preston Jr. in the Safari Rally. The project did not continue past this one-off entry, where Preston was 2nd and Waldegård 4th.

The second time Martini Racing sponsored a rally team was 1980, where Luigi Racing (Belgium) started with a BMW 323i E21 Group 2. Luigi Racing was before successful in the European Touring Car Championship with a BMW 3.0 Coupé CSL. Driver of the 323i have been Hermes Delbar and Timo Mäkinen.

In 1982, just as they had done one year previously with sports cars, Martini Racing signed with the works Lancia team, sponsoring the brand new Group B Lancia 037, with Attilio Bettega and Markku Alen as drivers. The Lancia Martini partnership in the World Rally Championship was one of the company's longest, remaining until the end of the 1992 season, with several cars, including the Group B Delta S4 and Group A Delta Integrale winning events and titles with drivers such as Juha Kankkunen, Bruno Saby, Massimo Biasion and Didier Auriol. The Martini Lancia cars won the WRC Drivers' title in 1987 and 1991 with Kankkunen, and 1988 and 1989 with Biasion, as well as the Constructors' title with the 037 in 1983, and consecutively with the Group A Delta from 1987 to 1992.

In the following years, Martini returned with a smaller sponsorship program, restricted to the Italian Rally Championship, which the Martini Racing driver, Gianfranco Cunico, won from 1994 to 1996 with a Jolly Club Ford Escort Cosworth.

Martini returned to the WRC full-time for the 1999 season onwards with Ford Motor Company's M-Sport-run World Rally Team. With drivers such as Carlos Sainz, Colin McRae and Markko Märtin, the Martini-liveried Fords won several rallies, but never the title. This arrangement ceased at the end of 2002.

The car model which has won the most titles for Martini Racing is the Lancia Delta HF Integrale.

== Touring car racing ==
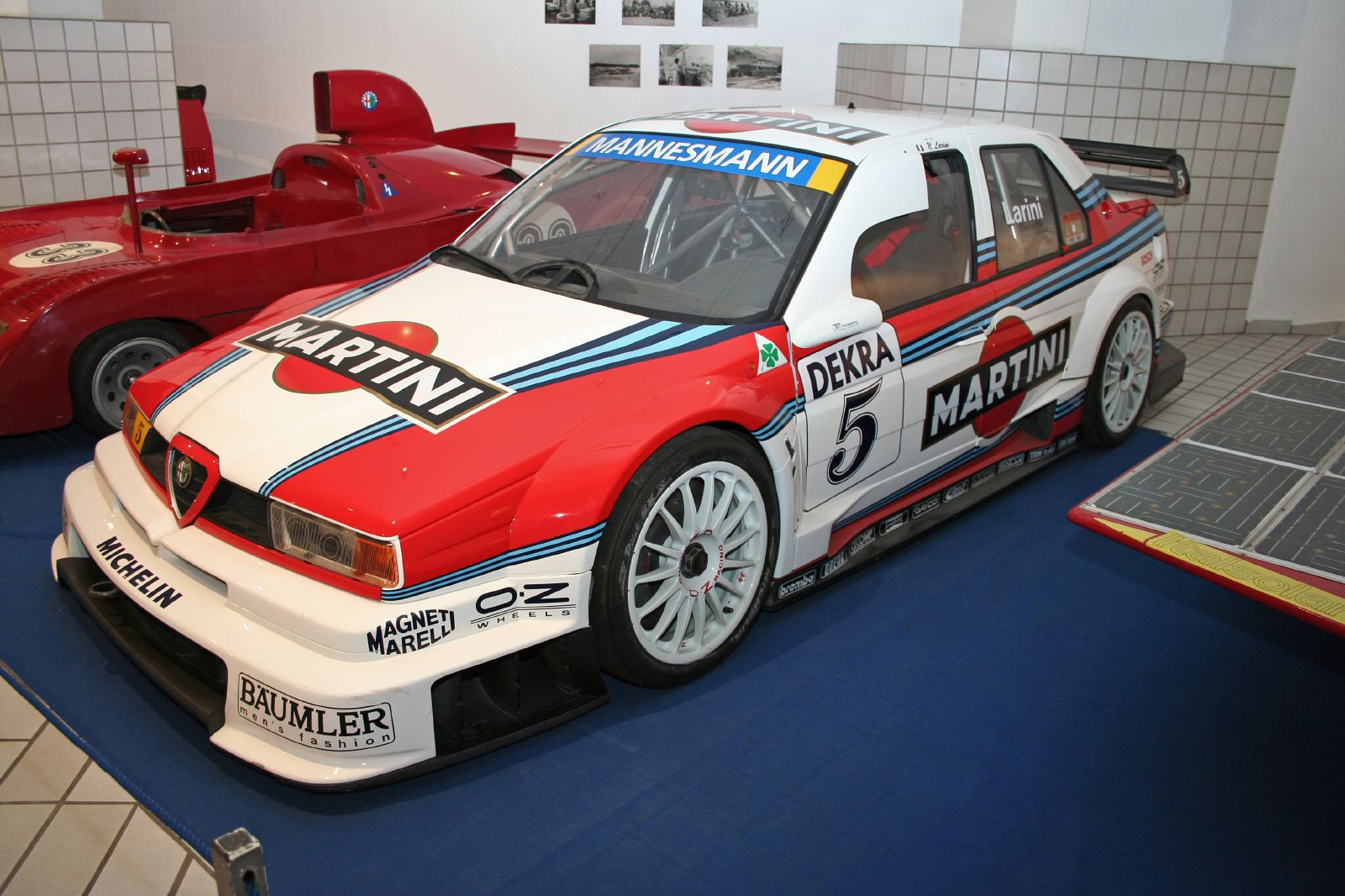
Martini Racing Alfa Romeo 155 V6 TI from 1996

It wouldn't be until 1992 that Martini Racing would be seriously involved with touring car racing. The Italian company sponsored the works Alfa Romeo 155 in the Italian Touring Car Championship, which the team dominated, with Nicola Larini taking the championship title.

This served as an appetizer to a bigger prize, most specifically the DTM, the German-based touring car series. Although the Martini Alfa Romeo connection only materialized in 1995 and by then the Alfas (driven by Larini and Alessandro Nannini, both ex-F1 drivers) weren't as competitive.

== Powerboats ==
Between 1973 and 1975, Martini Racing sponsored Carlo Bonomi and Cesare Fiorio's Dry Martini boats in the Powerboat World Championship, winning back-to-back titles in 1973 and 1974. At the time, the Martini boat hit an average top speed of 66.9 mph. Martini returned to offshore racing in 1978 sponsoring Guido Niccolai's boats, who took the European titles in 1979 and 1981. The 35 foot Cigarette that was commissioned by Carlo Bonomi is currently owned and raced by Jonathan Sainsbury, a furniture designer from Dorset.

In 1982 Martini Racing entered the Formula 1 Powerboat World Championship supporting the defending champion Renato Molinari: he missed the title by a single point, but won the following two seasons.

In 1987 Martini was back again in offshore racing with a Molinari-designed powerboat equipped with Lancia-Ferrari engines. After two seasons with poor results, Molinari switched to a new catamaran design powered by Lamborghini engines. At the end of 1989 both Molinari and Martini retired from powerboat racing.

In 2014, the Vector-Martini team of Peter Dredge, Simon Powell and Mal Crease crossed the finish line at the Cowes Offshore Classic more than four nautical miles ahead of their nearest rival. The following year, the same team of Dredge, Powell and Crease (with new member David Gandy) won the race more than 19 minutes ahead of the second place team.

== Notes ==
- Sponsors: Martini & Rossi on Grandprix.com
