= Martini & Rossi =

Italian company

- Type: Subsidiary
- Industry: Alcoholic beverages
- Founded: Turin, Italy (1863)
- Headquarters: Pessione, Chieri, Turin, Italy
- Key people: Alessandro Martini; Luigi Rossi; Teofilo Sola; Dante Martini
- Products: Vermouth and sparkling wine
- Parent: Bacardi Limited
- Website: martini.com

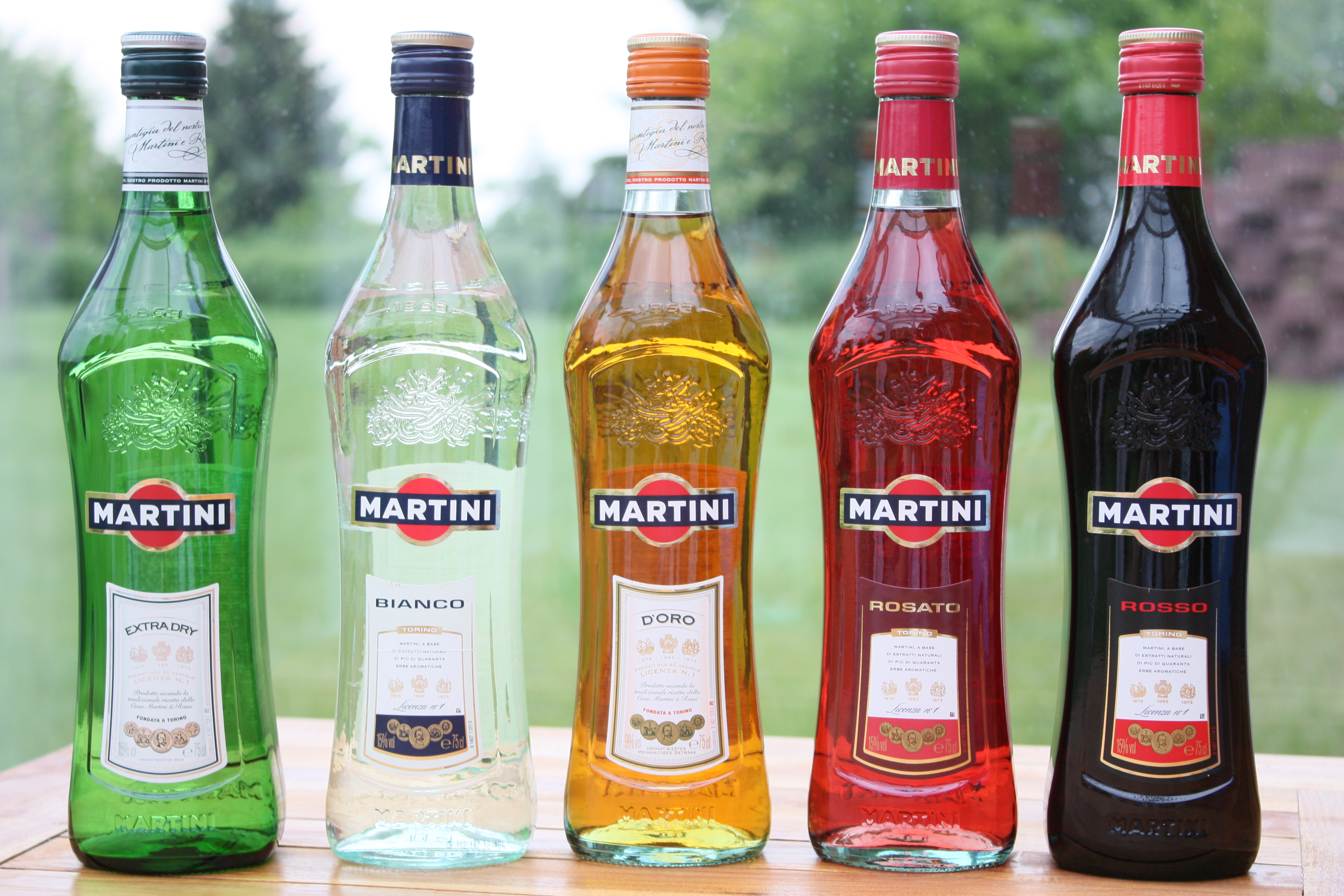
Five Martini flavours

Martini & Rossi is an Italian multinational alcoholic beverage company primarily associated with the Martini brand of vermouth and also with sparkling wine (for example, Asti and Prosecco). It also produces the French vermouth, Noilly Prat.

== History ==
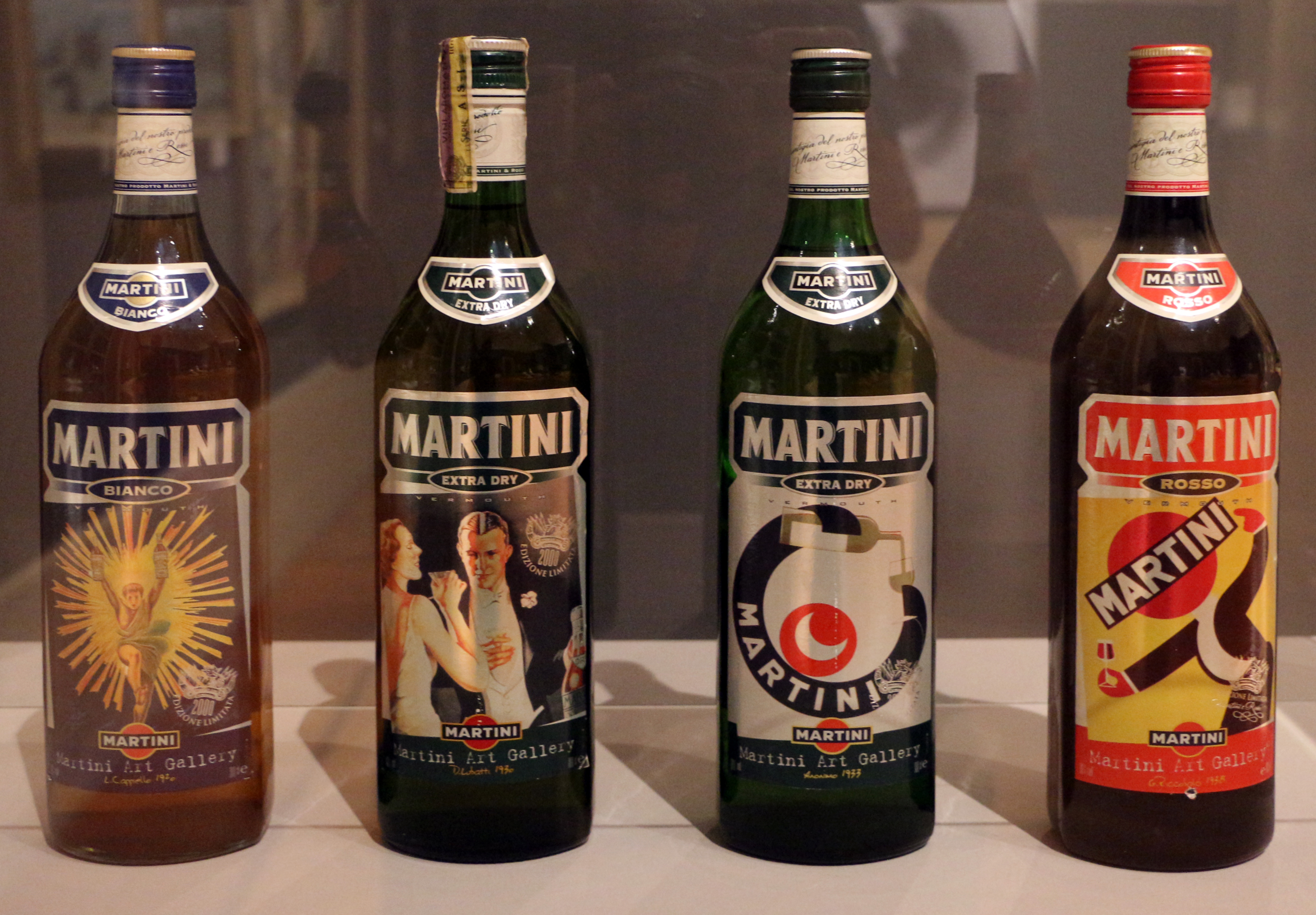
Historical bottles from Martini & Rossi

The company started in the mid-19th century as a vermouth bottling plant in Pessione – the Distilleria Nazionale di Spirito di Vino. Three men came to dominate the company, businessman Alessandro Martini, winemaker Luigi Rossi and accountant Teofilo Sola. In 1863, they changed the name to Martini, Sola & Cia. The Sola family sold out in 1879, and the company became known as Martini & Rossi.

- 1892 – The business is taken over by Rossi's four sons.
- 1929 – The Martini Ball & Bar logo is registered for the first time.
- 1930 – Rossi's grandsons take over control of the company.
- 1977 – The company is restructured with the creation of the General Beverage Corporation.
- 1993 – Martini & Rossi merge with Bacardi.

== Motor racing ==
The company was involved in motor racing sponsorship under the Martini Racing banner from 1968 to 2018, most notably in rallying with Lancia and in sports car racing with Porsche. It was a minor sponsor of Scuderia Ferrari between 2006 and 2008. From 2014 to 2018, Martini was the title sponsor of Williams F1, with the team officially called "Williams Martini Racing", and the car in the traditional Martini racing colours.

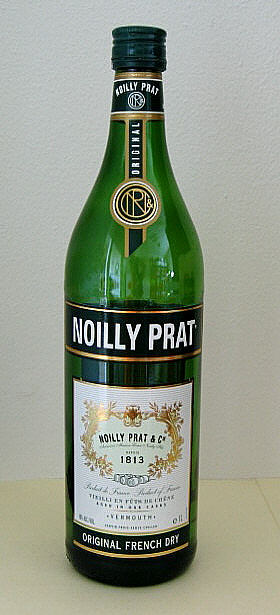
Noilly Prat is the company's French brand of vermouth

== Brands ==
=== Vermouth ===
Vermouth is made from wine with added sugar, alcohol and botanicals (herbs and spices).

- Martini Rosso – 1863
- Martini Bianco – 1910
- Martini Extra Dry – launched on New Year's Day, 1900.
- Martini Rosato
- Martini D'Oro – 1998
- Martini Fiero
- Martini Gold
- Martini Royale
- Martini Bitter
- Noilly Prat, a French vermouth owned by the company

=== Sparkling wine ===
Their sparkling wines are all from northern Italy and are sold under the Martini & Rossi brand:

- Martini & Rossi Asti (75cl and blue 25cl bottles) from Piedmont
- Martini & Rossi Prosecco (75cl bottles) from Veneto

== See also ==
- List of companies of Italy
