= Alessandro Martini =

Italian businessman

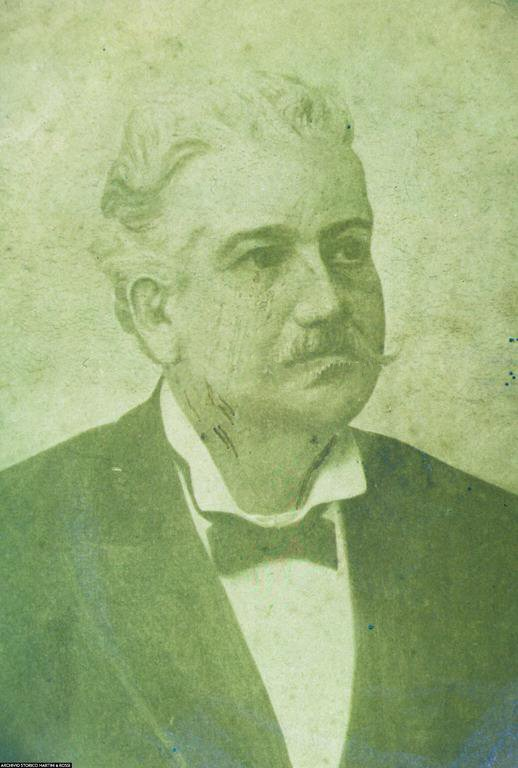
Alessandro Martini

Alessandro Martini (16 May 1812 – 14 March 1905) was an Italian businessman, founder of one of the most important vermouth companies in the world, Martini & Rossi, which produces the Martini vermouth.

In 1830, he purchased a small wine company situated very close to Turin. In 1847, several Italian businessmen started producing wine, spirits and vermouth for the Distilleria Nazionale di Spirito di Vino of Turin. Thanks to the Risorgimento, the economic prospects were bright, and the organization soon began to turn a profit. A few years later, Alessandro Martini joined the small team, becoming the director in 1863 along with Luigi Rossi (who was the inventor of a vermouth) and Teofilo Sola. During this early period, the Distilleria Nazionale di Spirito di Vino kept on growing, and several subsidiaries were created in Genoa, Cagliari and Narbonne thanks to the protection of the King of Piedmont.

In 1863, which can be considered one of the most important dates in the company's history (so much so that it is still written on the bottle), Martini, Sola and Rossi changed the name of the company to "Martini, Sola & Cia". They started exporting the bottles of vermouth around the world. New York City was given its first crates in 1867. At the same time, the firm was awarded a good many prizes, which are still proudly recorded on the bottles: Dublin (1865), Paris (1867 and 1878), Vienna (1873) and Philadelphia (1876). Just thirty years after its creation, Martini was drunk in the United States, Brazil, Argentina, Greece, Portugal, Belgium, Egypt and other countries.

In 1879, Sola died, and his sons sold all their shares in the company. The firm consequently decided to change its name to Martini & Rossi, the name seen today on the bottles sold in the United States. Between 1870 and 1880, the company diversified and the two directors launched Vino Canelli Spumante (now known as Asti Martini). One of their successes was to build upon the traditions of the late 19th-century European courts' fondness for vermouth. In 1868, the company was authorized by King Victor Emmanuel II of Savoy to put the symbols of the royal family on their packaging. King Louis of Portugal (1872), the Queen of Austria, Christina (also regent of Spain) (1897) and the British Parliament did the same. The symbols of Melbourne, Anvers and Mendoza quickly followed; their marks are still seen on the packaging to this day.

When Alessandro Martini died in 1905, the three sons of Luigi Rossi inherited the company. They had already launched Martini Extra Dry (1900) and Martini Bianco before his death, and had created subsidiaries around the world. In 1922, the company officially became known as Martini, except in the United States, where they were compelled to keep Martini & Rossi because Martini was already an American cocktail.
