= Anne Rosine Noilly-Prat =

Anne Rosine Noilly-Prat (1825 – 16 August 1902), was a French businessperson. As the owner of Noilly Prat for thirty-seven years, from 1865, she was one of the biggest business figures in France during the Second Empire.

She was born in Lyon, the daughter of Louis Noilly and Magdeleine Briget. She died in Marseille.
