= Martini (vermouth) =

Brand of Italian drinks

- Type: Aperitif
- Manufacturer: Alessandro Martini, Luigi Rossi and Teofilo Sola
- Origin: Turin, Italy
- Introduced: 1863
- Alcohol by volume: 15%
- Website: www.martini.com

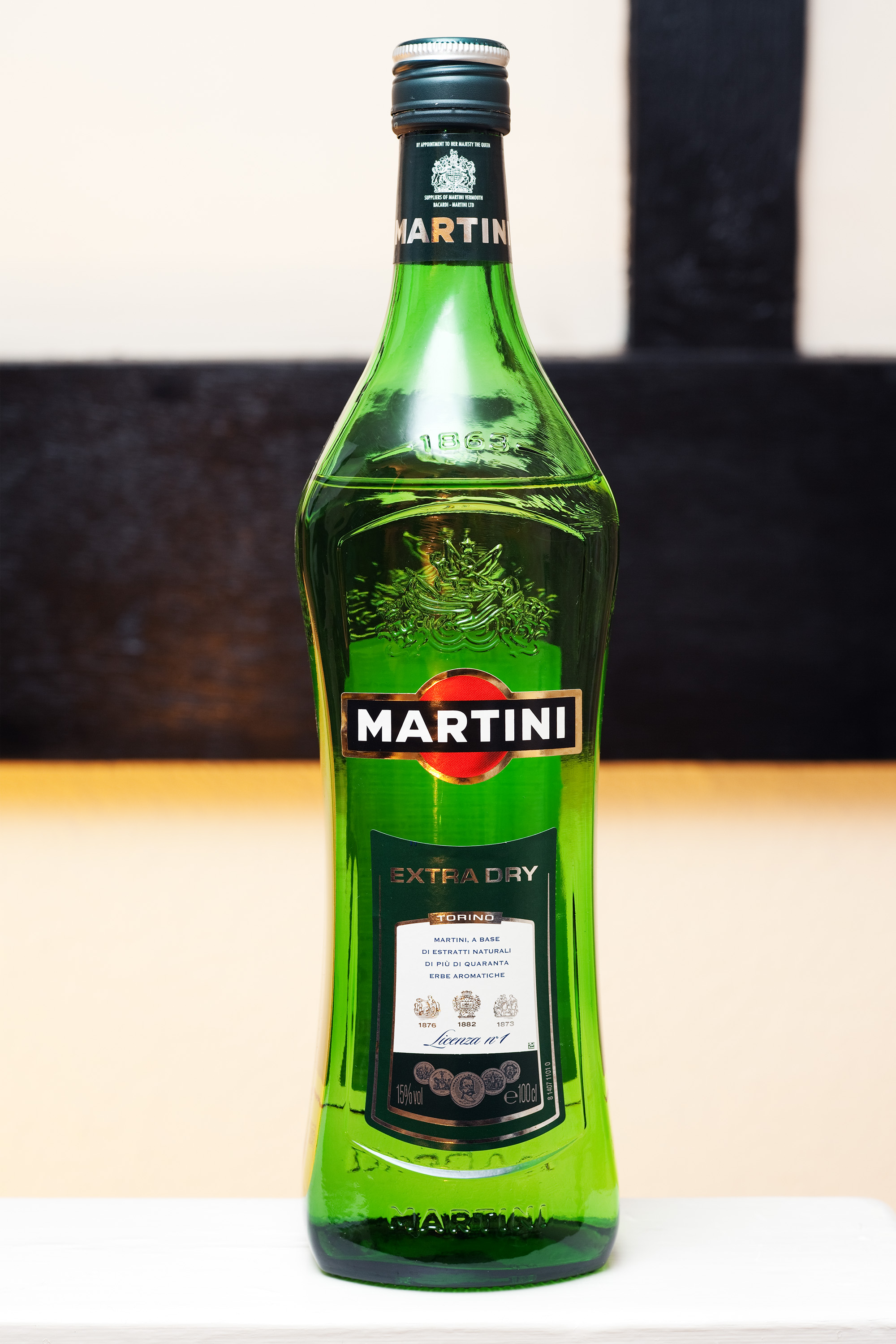
Martini Extra Dry

Martini is a brand of Italian drinks, named after the Martini & Rossi Distilleria Nazionale di Spirito di Vino, in Turin.

== History ==
Clemente Michel, Carlo Re, Carlo Agnelli and Eligio Baudino started the company in 1847, as a vermouth bottling plant in Pessione (A small village near Turin). A few years later Alessandro Martini joined the team, becoming the director in 1863 along with Teofilo Sola and Luigi Rossi (who was the inventor of a vermouth). In 1863, they changed the company name to Martini, Sola & Cia. They started exporting bottles of vermouth around the world. New York city was given its first crates in 1867. At the time the firm was awarded several prizes, which are still recorded on the bottles: Dublin (1865), Paris (1867 and 1878), Vienna (1873) and Philadelphia (1876). Just thirty years after its creation, Martini was available in the United States, Brazil, Argentina, Greece, Portugal, Belgium, Egypt and other countries. In 1879, the Sola family sold its interests to the remaining partners, who renamed the company Martini & Rossi, as it stands today.

The brand may have given the American martini vermouth and gin cocktail its name (an early recipe for which is known from 1888), though other speculations on the cocktail's etymology exist.

In 1892, the business was taken over by Rossi's four sons; control passed to his grandsons in 1930. In 1929, the Martini Ball & Bar logo was registered for the first time. Restructuring was carried out in 1977 resulting in the creation of the General Beverage Corporation. In 1992, Martini & Rossi merged with Bacardi. "Martini is the world's fourth most powerful 'spirit' brand" according to a survey of the market in 2006.

In 1970 and 1971, Martini together with Rossi supported the so-called "Ladies Football World Championships". These tournaments were entirely independent from FIFA and the common national soccer associations. They were held in Rome and in Mexico.

== Drinks ==
Martini is made from four ingredients: wine, botanicals, sugar and alcohol

- Martini Rosso – 1863
- Martini Extra Dry – launched on New Year's Day 1900
- Martini Bianco – 1910
- Martini Rosato – 1980
- Martini D'Oro – 1998
- Martini Fiero – 1998 – new 2017
- Martini Soda
- Martini Riserva Montelera
- Martini Bitter – 1872
- Martini Brut
- Martini Rosé demi sec – 2009
- Martini Dolce
- Martini Prosecco
- Martini Asti
- Martini Gold by Dolce&Gabbana – 2010
- Martini Royale – 2012
- Martini Gran Lusso Limited Edition 150 years – 2013
- Martini Riserva Speciale Ambrato – 2015
- Martini Riserva Speciale Rubino – 2015
- Martini Riserva Speciale Bitter – 2017

== See also ==
- Martini (cocktail)
