= 1970 24 Hours of Daytona =

Sports car endurance race in Florida, US

Previous: 1969	Next: 1971
Index: Races | Winners

The 1970 24 Hours of Daytona was an endurance race at the 3.8 mile road circuit at the Daytona International Speedway, Daytona Beach, Florida, USA that took place on January 31 and February 1, 1970. It was the first race of the 1970 World Sportscar Championship season.

== Pre-Race ==
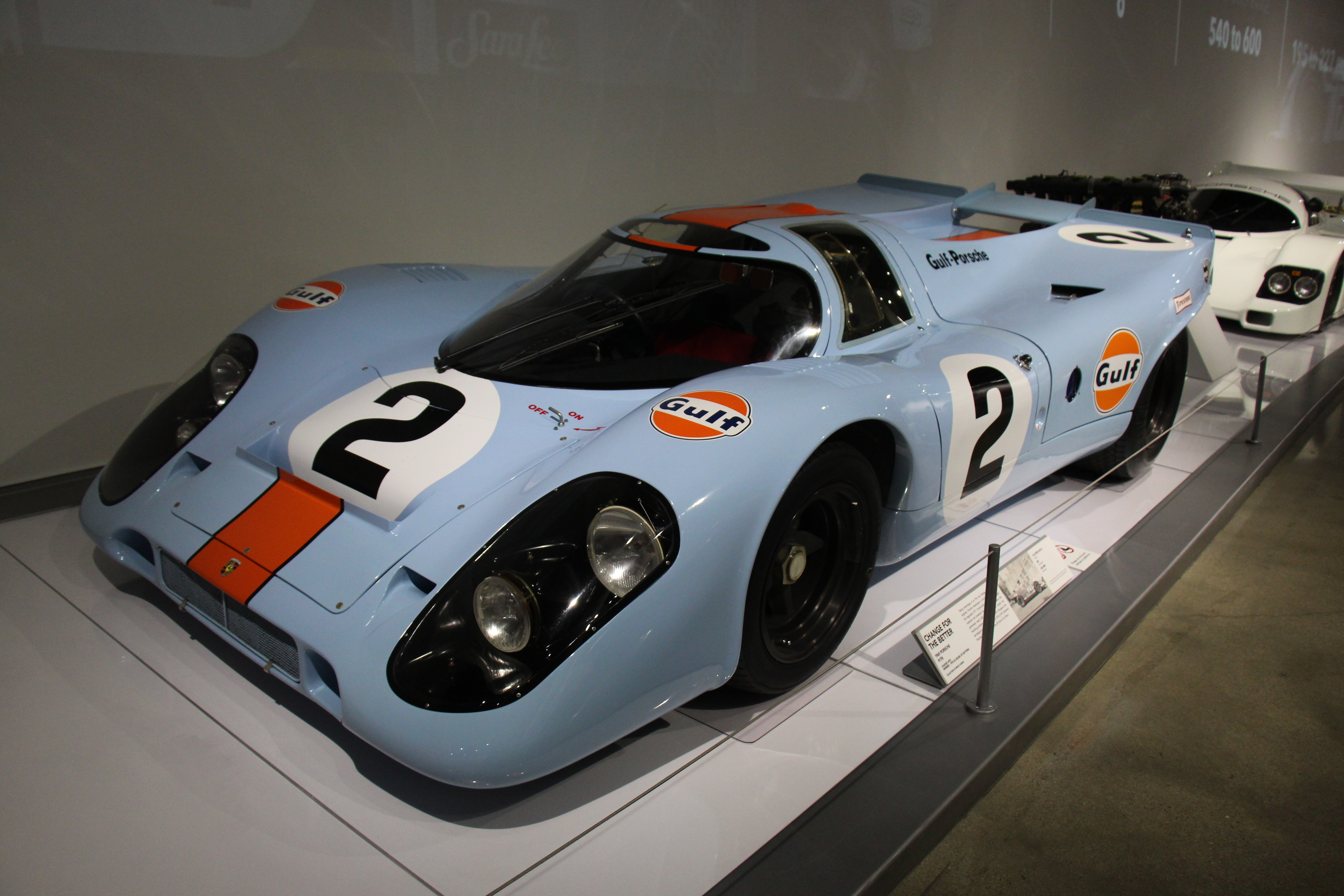
Porsche 917K No.2 similar to the race winning JWA-Gulf car. Note the extra window in the roof

The '70 Daytona was the first race of Porsche 917 as the iconic wedge-shaped 917K in JWA-Gulf livery which had been tested here in prior months. For better orientation in the banked oval, an extra window was put in the front of the 917-roof. It also was the debut for the recently homologated Ferrari 512 S cars.

While the official Porsche factory team JWA entered two 917K, a third de-facto-factory 917K was entered by Porsche Salzburg, but the fourth, private 917K did not start due to engine problems. Ferrari also brought three 5-litre factory cars, and two customer 512S showed up also. In addition, two 1969 3-litre Ferrari 312 P were now raced by NART, challenged in their class not only by some private 1969 Porsche 908/02 but also by the Matra factory that had suffered an accident during travel.

There were also various older Sportscars, GTs and Touring cars.

== Race ==
Ex-Aston Martin race team manager John Wyer's Gulf-sponsored team finished 1-2 in the race and broke the distance record by 190 miles, with a lead of no less than 45 laps over the sister car. Brian Redman was on both cars. The #28 works Ferrari finished 3rd ahead of the two 312P. A Corvette finished 6th.

It was the first race in which the now iconic Porsche 917K appeared, and this event effectively began the 917's domination of the WSC for the next 2 seasons, as the next race, the 1970 12 Hours of Sebring, would be Ferrari's sole win.

== Official results ==
Daytona's road course in 1970

Pos	Class	No	Team	Drivers	Chassis	Engine	Laps	Time
1	S 5.0	2	(United Kingdom) John Wyer Automotive Engineering	(Mexico) Pedro Rodríguez (Finland) Leo Kinnunen (United Kingdom) Brian Redman	Porsche 917K	Porsche 4.5L Flat-12	724	24:00:52
2	S 5.0	1	(United Kingdom) John Wyer Automotive Engineering	(Switzerland) Jo Siffert (United Kingdom) Brian Redman	Porsche 917K	Porsche 4.5L Flat-12	679	+ 45 Laps
3	S 5.0	28	(Italy) SpA Ferrari SEFAC	(United States) Mario Andretti (Italy) Arturo Merzario (Belgium) Jacky Ickx	Ferrari 512 S	Ferrari 5.0L V12	676	+ 48 Laps
4	P 3.0	24	(United States) North American Racing Team	(United States) Sam Posey (United Kingdom) Mike Parkes	Ferrari 312 P Coupé	Ferrari 3.0L V12	647	+ 77 Laps
5	P 3.0	23	(United States) North American Racing Team	(United States) Tony Adamowicz (United Kingdom) David Piper	Ferrari 312 P Coupé	Ferrari 3.0L V12	632	+ 92 Laps
6	GT +2.0	7	(United States) Owens-Corning Fibreglass	(United States) Jerry Thompson (United States) John Mahler	Chevrolet Corvette	Chevrolet 7.0L V8	608	+ 116 Laps
7	S 5.0	21	(United States) North American Racing Team	(United States) Gregg Young (United States) Luigi Chinetti Jr.	Ferrari 250 LM	Ferrari 3.3L V12	603	+ 121 Laps
8	S 5.0	18	(United States) William Wonder	(United States) William Wonder (United States) Ray Cuomo	Ford GT40 Mk. I	Ford 4.9L V8	579	+ 145 Laps
9	P 3.0	40	(United States) Gregg Loomis	(United States) Gregg Loomis (United States) Bert Everett	Porsche 906LE	Porsche 3.0L Flat-8	573	+ 151 Laps
10	P 3.0	33	(France) Equipe Matra-Simca	(France) François Cevert (Australia) Jack Brabham	Matra-Simca MS650	Matra 3.0L V12	565	+ 159 Laps
11	GT +2.0	89	(United States) Cliff Gottliob	(United States) Cliff Gottliob (United States) Dave Dooley	Chevrolet Corvette	Chevrolet 7.0L V8	545	+ 179 Laps
12	T +2.0	12	(United States) Bob Mitchell	(United States) Bob Mitchell (United States) Charlie Kemp	Chevrolet Camaro	Chevrolet 5.0L V8	535	+ 190 Laps
13	GT +2.0	6	(United States) Owens-Corning Fibreglass	(United States) Tony DeLorenzo (United States) Dick Lang	Chevrolet Corvette	Chevrolet 7.0L V8	534	+ 190 Laps
14	GT; 2.0	74	(United States) Ralph Meaney	(United States) Ralph Meaney (United States) Gary Wright (United States) Bill Bean	Porsche 911S	Porsche 2.0L Flat-6	533	+ 191 Laps
15	GT +2.0	90	(United States) Or Costanzo	(United States) Or Costanzo (United States) Dave Heinz	Chevrolet Corvette	Chevrolet 7.0L V8	521	+ 203 Laps
16	GT +2.0	14	(United States) Ray Cuomo Racing	(United States) Ray Cuomo (United States) Bernard Gimbel (United States) George Lissberg	Ford Mustang	Ford 4.7L V8	520	+ 204 Laps
17	T +2.0	95	(United States) Bruce Behrens	(United States) Mike Brockman (United States) John Tremblay	Chevrolet Camaro	Chevrolet 5.0L V8	511	+ 213 Laps
18	P 3.0	34	(France) Equipe Matra-Simca	(France) Jean-Pierre Beltoise (France) Henri Pescarolo	Matra-Simca MS650	Matra 3.0L V12	509	+ 215 Laps
19	T +2.0	11	(United States) Laurel Racing	(United States) Larry Brock (United States) Larry Dent	Chevrolet Camaro	Chevrolet 5.0L V8	507	+ 217 Laps
20	GT; 2.0	78	(United States) Waldron Motors	(United States) John Belpreche (United States) Tony Lilly (United States) Don Pickett	MGB	BMC 1.8L I4	504	+ 220 Laps
21	GT; 2.0	79	(United States) Waldron Motors	(United States) Chris Waldron (United States) Lowell Lanier (United States) William "Bill" Baros	MGB	BMC 1.8L I4	490	+ 234 Laps
22	T 2.0	48	(United States) Del Russo Taylor	(United States) Del Russo Taylor (United States) Hank Sheldon (United States) Ron Goldleaf	Alfa Romeo GTV 1750	Alfa Romeo 1.75L I4	478	+ 246 Laps
23	T 2.0	38	(United States) Simone N. Fleming	(United States) Paul Fleming (United States) Amos Johnson	Fiat 124	Fiat 1.4L I4	473	+ 251 Laps
24	GT; 2.0	76	(United States) Scotty Addison	(United States) Scotty Addison (United States) Erhard Dahm	Porsche 911S	Porsche 2.0L Flat-6	462	+ 262 Laps
25	T +2.0	98	(United States) Norberto Mastandrea	(United States) Norberto Mastandrea (United States) Smokey Drolet (United States) Rajah Rodgers	Chevrolet Camaro	Chevrolet 5.0L V8	409	+ 315 Laps
26	T +2.0	83	(United States) Collins-Wilson Racing	(United States) Vincent P. Collins (United States) Larry Wilson	Ford Mustang	Ford 4.7L V8	407	+317 Laps
27	S 5.0	71	(United States) Ray Malle	(United States) Ray Malle (United States) Bob Speakman	TVR Vixen Ford	Ford 1.6L I4	364	+ 360 Laps

=== Did not finish ===
Class	No	Team	Drivers	Chassis	Engine	Laps	Reason
GT +2.0	9	(United States) Mamie Reynolds Gregory	(United States) Don Yenko (United States) Bob Grossman	Chevrolet Camaro	Chevrolet 7.0L V8	542	differential
S 5.0	25	(United States) North American Racing Team	(United States) Dan Gurney (United States) Chuck Parsons	Ferrari 512 S	Ferrari 5.0L V12	464	gearbox
GT +2.0	8	(United States) Bob Johnson	(United States) Bob Johnson (United States) Robert R. Johnson (United States) Jim Greendyke	Chevrolet Corvette	Chevrolet 7.0L V8	457	unknown
GT; 2.5	47	(United States) Sports Motors	(United States) Jim Bandy (United States) Fred Stevenson (United States) Carl Williams	Lotus Europa	Ford 1.6L I4	442	engine
S 5.0	30	(Italy) Scuderia Picchio Rosso	(Italy) Corrado Manfredini (Italy) Gianpiero Moretti	Ferrari 512 S	Ferrari 5.0L V12	412	accident damage
P 3.0	53	(Finland) Hans Laine	(Finland) Hans Laine (Netherlands) Gijs van Lennep	Porsche 908/02	Porsche 3.0L Flat-8	385	engine
GT; 2.0	43	(United States) William Harris	(United States) William Harris (United States) Robert E. Lewis	Austin-Healey Sprite	BMC 1.3L I4	373	unknown
GT; 2.0	72	(Canada) Jacques Duval	(Canada) Jacques Duval (United States) Bob Bailey	Porsche 911T	Porsche 2.0L Flat-6	365	gearbox
T +2.0	97	(United States) Preston Hood	(United States) John Elliott (United States) Don Gwynne Jr.	Chevrolet Camaro	Chevrolet 5.0L V8	354	unknown
S 5.0	3	(Austria) Porsche Salzburg	(Germany) Kurt Ahrens Jr. (United Kingdom) Vic Elford	Porsche 917K	Porsche 4.5L Flat-12	337	fuel tank
GT +2.0	94	(United States) Susan T. Cummings	(United States) Don Cummings (United States) Warren Stumes	Shelby GT350	Ford 4.7L V8	327	unknown
T +2.0	15	(United States) Bob Fryer	(United States) Ed Lowther (United States) Bob Nagel	Chevrolet Camaro	Chevrolet 5.0L V8	320	unknown
S 5.0	20	(United States) North American Racing Team	(United States) Harley Cluxton (United States) Gordon Tatum	Ferrari 365 GTB/C	Ferrari 4.4L V12	308	cooling system
S 5.0	17	(United Kingdom) Trevor Graham	(United Kingdom) Piers Forrester (United Kingdom) Andrew Hedges	Ford GT40 Mk.I	Ford 4.9L V8	299	suspension
GT; 2.0	77	(United States) Jennings/Keyser	(United States) Bruce Jennings (United States) Bob Tullius	Porsche 911T	Porsche 2.0L I6	279	unknown
T 2.0	88	(United States) Dieter Oest	(United States) Barry Batchin (United States) Dieter Oest	Lancia Fulvia HF	Lancia 1.6L V4	268	engine
T 2.0	84	(United States) HCAS	(United States) Walter Brown (United States) Joe Marcus (United States) Jim R. Sandman	BMW 2002	BMW 2.0L I4	257	ignition
T 2.0	85	(United States) Robert Whitaker	(United States) Robert Whitaker (United States) Richard Krebs (United States) Harvey Eckoff	Volvo 122 S	Volvo 1.8L I4	243	unknown
T +2.0	92	(United States) Flem-Car	(United States) Donna Mae Mims (United States) Jim Corwin (United States) Fred Pipen	Chevrolet Camaro	Chevrolet 5.0L V8	220	unknown
T +2.0	0	(United States) Roger Penske Racing	(United States) Mark Donohue (United States) Peter Revson	AMC Javelin	AMC Rambler 5.0L V8	205	oil pressure
P 3.0	73	(United States) Ring Free Oil Racing	(France) Bobby Rinzler (United States) Charles Reynolds	Austin-Healey Sprite	BMC 1.3L I4	178	head gasket
S 5.0	22	(United States) North American Racing Team	(United States) Ronnie Bucknum (United States) Wilbur Pickett	Ferrari 365 GTB/4	Ferrari 4.4L V12	142	cooling system
T +2.0	96	(United States) Vincenzo Gimondo	(United States) Vince Gimondo (United States) Chuck Dietrich	Chevrolet Camaro	Chevrolet 5.0L V8	130	brakes
S 5.0	27	(Italy) SpA Ferrari SEFAC	(Belgium) Jacky Ickx (Switzerland) Peter Schetty	Ferrari 512 S	Ferrari 5.0L V12	115	accident
P 3.0	16	(United States) Ring Free Oil Racing	(United States) Jim Baker (United Kingdom) Clive Baker	Chevron B16	Ford-Cosworth FVC 1.8L I4	108	accident
GT +2.0	91	(United States) John Greenwood	(United States) Allan Barker (United States) John Greenwood (United States) Richard Hoffman	Chevrolet Corvette	Chevrolet 7.0L V8	101	accident
S 5.0	39	(Canada) Rainer Brezinka	(Canada) Rainer Brezinka (Canada) Horst Petermann (Canada) Rudy Bartling	Porsche 906	Porsche 1.9L Flat-6	96	engine
S 5.0	26	(Italy) SpA Ferrari SEFAC	(Italy) Nino Vaccarella (Italy) Ignazio Giunti	Ferrari 512 S	Ferrari 5.0L V12	89	accident
T +2.0	93	(United States) Jim Harrell	(United States) Jim Harrell (United States) Len Magner	Ford Mustang	Ford 4.7L V8	89	engine
P 3.0	37	(United States) Fred Opert Racing	(United States) Brian Robinson (United States) Hugh Kleinpeter (United States) Fred Opert	Chevron B16	Ford-Cosworth FVC 1.8L I4	85	fuel injection
S 5.0	19	(United States) Auto Enterprises	(United States) Francis C. Grant (United States) Ray Heppenstall (United States) Joe Marcus	Ford GT40 Mk.I	Ford 4.9L V8	82	head gasket
T +2.0	66	(United States) Ed Matthews	(United States) Ed Matthews (United States) Don Sesslar (United States) Al Weaver	Ford Mustang	Ford 4.7L V8	63	overheating
T 2.0	86	(United States) Arthur Mollin	(United States) Arthur Mollin (United States) Art Riley	Volvo 122 S	Volvo 1.8L I4	54	engine
GT; 2.0	70	(United States) Paul Stanford	(United States) James Patterson (United States) Paul Stanford	Porsche 911T	Porsche 2.0L I6	29	accident
GT +2.0	46	(United States) Jack Haywood	(United States) Claibourne Darden (United States) Warren Matzen	Shelby GT350	Ford 4.7L V8	26	oil system
T 2.0	55	(United States) Jack Kearney	(United States) Don Kearney (United States) Dick Roberts (United States) Wayne Purdy	Datsun 510	Datsun 1.6L I4	24	engine
S 5.0	5	(Canada) Randy's Auto Body Shop	(Canada) John Cannon (Canada) George Eaton	Lola T70 Mk.IIIB	Chevrolet 5.0L V8	0	handling, oil leak
P 3.0	54	(Argentina) Juan Manuel Fangio	(Argentina) Carlos Pairetti (United Kingdom) Alain de Cadenet (Argentina) Jorge Omar del Río	Porsche 908/02	Porsche 3.0L Flat-8	0	engine

=== Did not start ===
Class	No	Team	Drivers	Chassis	Engine	Reason
S 5.0	52	(United Kingdom) Tony Dean	(United Kingdom) Tony Dean (United States) Peter Gregg	Porsche 917K	Porsche 4.5L Flat-12	engine
T +2.0	10	(United States) Hewitt Racing	(United States) Alan Hewitt (United States) Pete Ledwith	Chevrolet Camaro	Chevrolet 5.0L V8	unknown
P 3.0	51	(Spain) Escuderia Montjuich	(Spain) Juan Fernandez (Spain) José Juncadella	Porsche 908/02	Porsche 3.0L Flat-8	unknown
GT 2.0	75	(Canada) Friedrich Hochreuter	(Canada) Fritz Hochreuter (Canada) Harry Bytzek	Porsche 911S	Porsche 2.0L Flat-6	unknown
P 3.0	44	(United States) H.R.H. Corp.	(United States) Steve Pieper (United States) Jim McDaniel (United States) Jon Krogsund	Deserter GS Volkswagen	VW 1.7L N/A	unknown

== Statistics ==
- Pole Position - #28 SpA Ferrari SEFAC Ferrari 512 S (Mario Andretti/Arturo Merzario)- 1:51.6 (122.903 mph/197.794 km/h)
- Fastest Lap - #1 John Wyer Automotive Porsche 917K (Jo Siffert) - 1:48.7 (126.159 mph/203.033 km/h)
- Distance - 4439.279 km (2735.974 mi)
- Average Speed - 184,859 km/h (115 mph)
- Weather conditions: Sunny

World Sportscar Championship
Previous race: 1969 1000km of Zeltweg	1970 season	Next race: 12 Hours of Sebring
