= Matra-Simca MS630 =

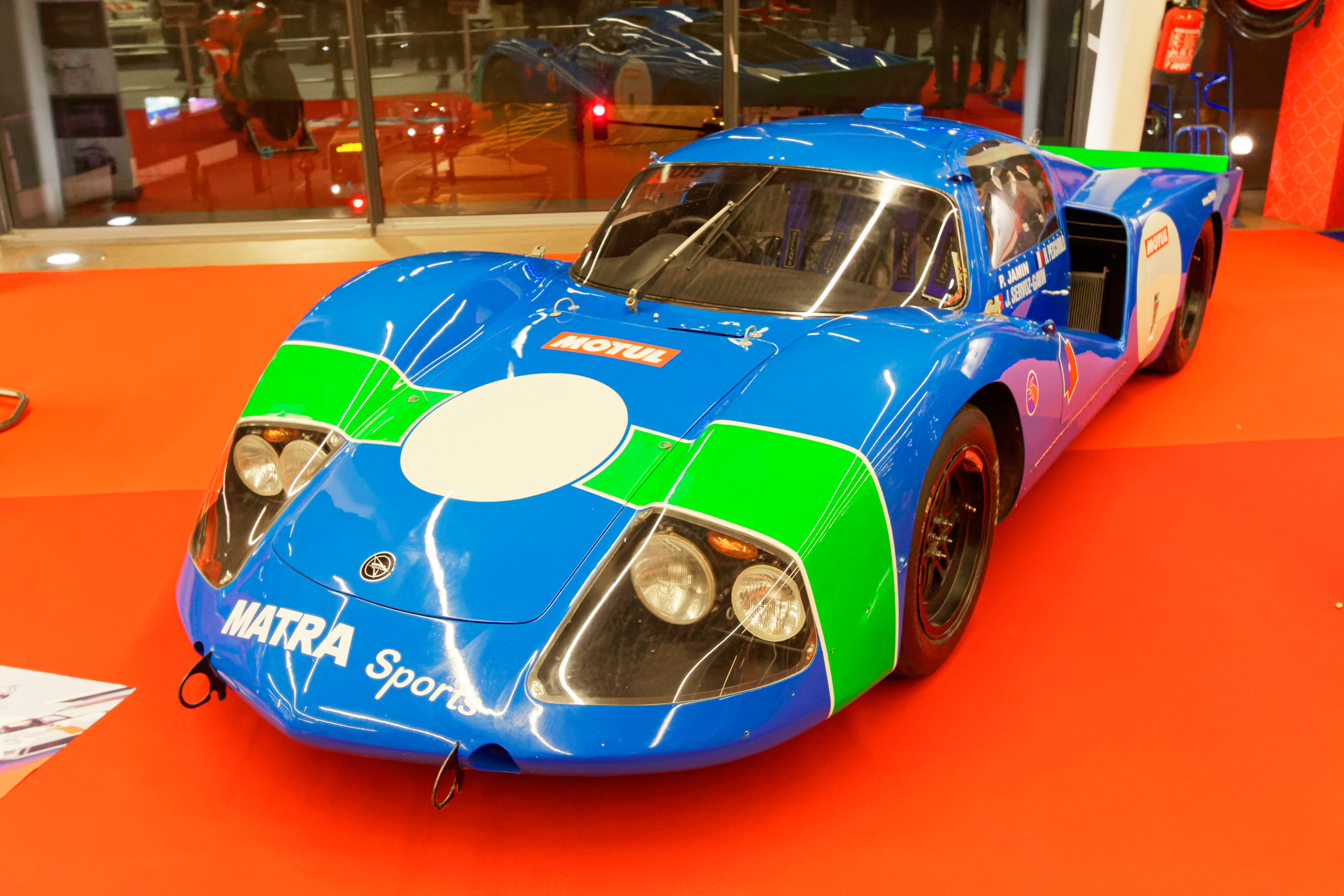
- 1967 Matra MS630 chassis 06
- Category: Group 6 Prototype
- Constructor: Matra
- Designer: Bernard Boyer
- Predecessor: MS620
- Successor: MS640 / MS650

Technical specifications
- Chassis: Glass-fibre reinforced plastic panels.
- Suspension (front): Double wishbones, coil springs over dampers.
- Suspension (rear): Double wishbones, coil springs over dampers.
- Axle track: Front: 1,440 mm (56.7 in); Rear: 1,490 mm (58.7 in)
- Wheelbase: 2,440 mm (96.1 in)
- Engine: 1967: BRM, 1,999 cc (122.0 cu in), NA, V8, Longitudinal, mid-mounted. 1968-1969: Matra, 2,993 cc (182.6 cu in), NA, 60º V12, Longitudinal, mid-mounted.
- Transmission: Matra 5-speed Manual.
- Fuel: Lucas

Competition history
- Notable entrants: Equipe Matra Sports; Equipe Matra - Elf
- Notable drivers: (France) Jean-Pierre Jaussaud (France) Johnny Servoz-Gavin (France) Jean-Pierre Beltoise (France) Henri Pescarolo (France) Jean Guichet (United Kingdom) Robin Widdows (Switzerland) Herbert Müller
- Debut: 1967 24 Hours of Le Mans
Races	Wins	Poles	F/Laps
6	0	0	0
- Teams' Championships: 0
- Constructors' Championships: 0

The Matra-Simca MS630 was a Group 6 prototype race car introduced in 1967 for the World Championship for Makes. The MS630 replaced the previous Matra MS620. The car was initially designated as the Matra M630, but when Simca sponsored Matra in 1969, it was renamed as the Matra-Simca MS630.

== Racing History ==
=== 1967 ===
For 1967, Matra decided to use a 1.9-litre version of the BRM Formula One V8 engine. (capable of producing 245 hp (183 kW; 248 PS) at 9,000 RPM.) Matra planned to have Johnny Servoz-Gavin/Jean-Pierre Jaussaud to drive the MS630 at both the 1967 1000 km of Spa and 1967 1000km of Nürburgring but the entries for both races were withdrawn. The MS630 only made one appearance in 1967, the 24 Hours of Le Mans. Matra entered two cars for Servoz-Gavin/Jean-Pierre Beltoise and Jaussaud/Henri Pescarolo. Servoz-Gavin/Beltoise retired with a broken oil pipe and Jaussaud/Pescarolo also retired with broken suspension.

In the World Championship for Makes, Matra scored no points during the year.

=== 1968 ===
For 1968, Matra decided to use their 3.0-litre Matra Sports V12 engine. The MS630 only made one appearance in 1968, the 24 Hours of Le Mans. Matra entered one car for Servoz-Gavin/Pescarolo but it retired with an accident caused by a puncture.

In the World Championship for Makes, Matra scored no points during the year for the second consecutive season.

=== 1969 ===
The first race of the season was the 1969 24 Hours of Daytona with Servoz-Gavin/Pescarolo but the car did not start the race due to a practice accident. The team skipped the 12 Hours of Sebring and BOAC 500. Matra entered the 1000 km of Monza with Servoz-Gavin/Jean Guichet but retired from the race with a fuel feed issue. The team skipped the 1969 Targa Florio. Matra planned to have Servoz-Gavin/Beltoise and Guichet ( who was scheduled to drive single handed) at the 1969 1000 km of Spa but the entry for the race was withdrawn and skipped the 1969 1000 km of Nürburgring. Matra entered four cars for the 24 Hours of Le Mans. Jean-Pierre Beltoise/Piers Courage in the new Matra-Simca MS650, Jean Guichet/Nino Vaccarella in the MS630, Nanni Galli/Robin Widdows and Johnny Servoz-Gavin/Herbert Müller were both in the updated Matra-Simca MS630/650 (A MS630 car with the parts from the MS650). Beltoise/Courage finished fourth followed by Guichet/Vaccarella in fifth, Galli/Widdows seventh and Servoz-Gavin/Müller retired when an electrical short circuit failed. For the Watkins Glen 6 Hours, Matra entered two cars for Servoz-Gavin/Pedro Rodriguez in the MS650 and Guichet/Widdows in the MS630/650. Servoz-Gavin/Rodriguez finished fourth and Guichet/Widdows retired with a broken clutch. The MS630 was retired before the 1000km of Zeltweg.

In the World Championship for Makes, Matra scored six points, earning it seventh in the championship. All points were scored by the MS650.

== Complete World Championship for Makes results ==
Year	Entrant	Class	Drivers	1	2	3	4	5	6	7	8	9	10	Points	WEMCP
1967	Equipe Matra Sports	Group 6		DAY	SEB	MNZ	SPA	TFO	NÜR	LMS	BHC			0	-
1967	Equipe Matra Sports	Group 6	(France) Johnny Servoz-Gavin							29				0	-
1967	Equipe Matra Sports	Group 6	(France) Jean-Pierre Beltoise							29				0	-
1967	Equipe Matra Sports	Group 6	(France) Jean-Pierre Jaussaud							43				0	-
1967	Equipe Matra Sports	Group 6	(France) Henri Pescarolo							43				0	-
1968	Equipe Matra Sports	Group 6		DAY	SEB	BHC	MNZ	TFO	SPA	NÜR	WGN	ZEL	LMS	0	-
1968	Equipe Matra Sports	Group 6	(France) Johnny Servoz-Gavin										19	0	-
1968	Equipe Matra Sports	Group 6	(France) Henri Pescarolo										19	0	-
1969	Equipe Matra - Elf	Group 6		DAY	SEB	BHC	MNZ	TFO	SPA	NÜR	LMS	WGN	ORC	6^{1}	5th^{1}
1969	Equipe Matra - Elf	Group 6	(France) Johnny Servoz-Gavin	DNS			26				25			6^{1}	5th^{1}
1969	Equipe Matra - Elf	Group 6	(France) Henri Pescarolo	DNS										6^{1}	5th^{1}
1969	Equipe Matra - Elf	Group 6	(Switzerland) Herbert Müller								25			6^{1}	5th^{1}
1969	Equipe Matra - Elf	Group 6	(France) Jean Guichet				26				5	16		6^{1}	5th^{1}
1969	Equipe Matra - Elf	Group 6	(France) Jean-Pierre Beltoise											6^{1}	5th^{1}
1969	Equipe Matra - Elf	Group 6	(Italy) Nino Vaccarella								5			6^{1}	5th^{1}
1969	Equipe Matra - Elf	Group 6	(Italy) Nanni Galli								7			6^{1}	5th^{1}
1969	Equipe Matra - Elf	Group 6	(United Kingdom) Robin Widdows								7	16		6^{1}	5th^{1}

^1 All points scored by the Matra-Simca MS650.
