= 1970 1000km of Brands Hatch =

Layout of the Brands Hatch (1960-1975)

The 1970 BOAC 1000 km was an endurance race held at the Brands Hatch circuit in Kent, England, United Kingdom on April 12, 1970. The race was the 3rd round of the 1970 World Sportscar Championship season.

== Pre-race ==
The challenging, bumpy and undulating Brands Hatch circuit near London saw New Zealander Chris Amon return temporarily to Ferrari to drive one of their 512's, and he qualified his car on pole position. Amon's fellow countryman Denny Hulme drove a works Porsche 917K with factory driver Vic Elford. This race was only for prototypes; no GT cars were allowed to enter.

== Race ==
On the day of the race, the conditions were made awful by heavy rain, wind and cold air- a common occurrence during spring in England. The race started with Elford, Jacky Ickx in another works Ferrari, Jo Siffert in works/John Wyer Porsche 917K all getting past Amon around the outside of Paddock Hill, and Amon was followed by Piers Courage in a works Alfa Romeo, Pedro Rodríguez in the other John Wyer Porsche and the rest of the field followed.

At the end of the first lap, Barrie Smith in a privately entered Lola crashed heavily on the pit straight, and yellow flags were shown at the site of the accident. Rodriguez, who passed cars while yellow flags were being shown (oblivious to the fact), was shown the black flag and went into the pits while an astonishing 2nd, was reprimanded. Ickx, like Rodriguez- was a wet-weather specialist, had passed Elford and was leading the race. But he soon went into the pits with rain-wiper motor failure.

Elford was back in the lead, but the flying Rodriguez, who had come up from coming out of the pits in 12th to 2nd by lap 15 (only about 25 minutes into the race), passed Elford and led the race. This was a lead he kept until the end; he and Elford drove their cars for 5 1/2 of the 6 1/2 hours of the race in the dreadful conditions, and Rodriguez won the race by 5 laps. Porsches romped home 1-2-3-4; the first 3 being 917K's. Rodriguez' performance was such that the race is sometimes known as "the day they forgot to tell Pedro it was raining".

The running of the race was changed from a 6 hour time limit to a 1000 kilometer overall distance.

== Official results ==
Pos	Class	No	Team	Drivers	Chassis	Engine	Laps
1	S 5.0	10	(United Kingdom) John Wyer Automotive Engineering	(Mexico) Pedro Rodríguez (Finland) Leo Kinnunen	Porsche 917K	Porsche 4.5L Flat-12	235
2	S 5.0	11	(Austria) Porsche Salzburg	(United Kingdom) Vic Elford (New Zealand) Denny Hulme	Porsche 917K	Porsche 4.5L Flat-12	230
3	S 5.0	12	(Austria) Porsche Salzburg	(United Kingdom) Richard Attwood (Germany) Hans Herrmann	Porsche 917K	Porsche 4.5L Flat-12	227
4	P 3.0	57	(Finland) Racing Team AAW	(Finland) Hans Laine (Netherlands) Gijs van Lennep	Porsche 908/02	Porsche 3.0L Flat-8	227
5	S 5.0	2	(Italy) SpA Ferrari SEFAC	(New Zealand) Chris Amon (Italy) Arturo Merzario	Ferrari 512S	Ferrari 5.0L V12	225
6	P 3.0	56	(Germany) Martini International	(France) Gérard Larrousse (Germany) Gerhard Koch	Porsche 908/02	Porsche 3.0L Flat-8	217
7	S 5.0	5	(Sweden) Ecurie Bonnier	(Sweden) Jo Bonnier (Sweden) Reine Wisell	Lola T70 Mk.3B	Chevrolet 5.0L V8	217
8	S 5.0	1	(Italy) SpA Ferrari SEFAC	(Belgium) Jacky Ickx (United Kingdom) Jackie Oliver	Ferrari 512S	Ferrari 5.0L V12	213
9	P 3.0	28	(United Kingdom) John L'Amie	(United Kingdom) John L'Amie (United Kingdom) Tommy Reid	Porsche 910	Porsche 1.9L Flat-6	211
10	S 2.0	25	(United Kingdom) Central Garage (Mirfield)	(United Kingdom) John Lepp (United Kingdom) George Silverwood	Chevron B8	BMW 1.8L I4	211
11	P 3.0	28	(United Kingdom) Nick Gold	(United Kingdom) Mike Beuttler (United Kingdom) Nick Gold	Porsche 910	Porsche 1.9L Flat-6	201
12	P 3.0	51	(France) Equipe Matra-Simca	(Australia) Jack Brabham (France) Jean-Pierre Beltoise	Matra-Simca MS650	Matra 3.0L V12	201
13	S 5.0	3	(Switzerland) Scuderia Filipinetti	(Switzerland) Herbert Müller (United Kingdom) Mike Parkes	Ferrari 512S	Ferrari 5.0L V12	197
14	S 2.0	25	(United Kingdom) Intertech Steering Wheels	(United Kingdom) John Lepp (United Kingdom) Angus Clydesdale	Chevron B8	BMW 1.8L I4	195
15	P 2.0	81	(United Kingdom) A. M. Graphic Racing Organisation	(United Kingdom) Gerry Birrell (United Kingdom) Andrew Mylius	Gropa CMC	Ford-Cosworth FVC 1.8L I4	195
16	P 2.0	79	(United Kingdom) Roger Nathan Racing	(United Kingdom) Roger Nathan (United Kingdom) Mike Beckwith	Astra RNR2	Ford-Cosworth FVC 1.8L I4	193
17	P 2.0	74	(United Kingdom) Chevron Racing Team	(United Kingdom) John Bridges (United Kingdom) Peter Lawson	Chevron B16	Ford-Cosworth FVC 1.8L I4	189

=== Did not finish ===
Class	No	Team	Drivers	Chassis	Engine	Laps
P 2.0	72	(United Kingdom) Mark Konig	(United Kingdom) Tony Lanfranchi (United Kingdom) Mark Konig	Nomad Mk.2	BRM 2.0L V8	185
P 3.0	58	(United Kingdom) Ecurie Evergreen	(United Kingdom) Alain de Cadenet (Argentina) Jorge Omar del Rio	Porsche 908/02	Porsche 3.0L Flat-8	179
S 5.0	9	(United Kingdom) John Wyer Automotive Engineering	(Switzerland) Jo Siffert (United Kingdom) Brian Redman	Porsche 917K	Porsche 4.5L Flat-12	176
P 3.0	52	(France) Equipe Matra-Simca	(France) Henri Pescarolo (France) Johnny Servoz-Gavin	Matra-Simca MS650	Matra 3.0L V12	161
S 2.0	21	(United Kingdom) Worcestershire Racing Association	(United Kingdom) John Bamford (United Kingdom) Peter Creasey (United Kingdom) James Tangye	Chevron B8	BMW 1.8L I4	112
P 2.0	77	(United Kingdom) Worcestershire Racing Association	(United Kingdom) Mike Walker (United Kingdom) John Burton	Chevron B16	Ford-Cosworth FVC 1.8L I4	101
S 2.0	24	(United Kingdom) Lec Refrigeration	(United Kingdom) David Purley (United Kingdom) Chris Skeaping	Chevron B8	BMW 1.8L I4	88
S 2.0	22	(United Kingdom) Paul Watson Race Organisation	(United Kingdom) Trevor Twaites (United Kingdom) Peter Smith	Chevron B8	BMW 1.8L I4	73
S 2.0	26	(United Kingdom) Road & Racing Accessories (Holborn) Ltd.	(United Kingdom) Paul Vestey (United States) Roy Pike	Porsche 910	Porsche 1.9L Flat-6	73
P 2.0	76	(United Kingdom) Digby Martland	(United Kingdom) Charles Lucas (United Kingdom) Digby Martland	Chevron B16	Ford-Cosworth FVC 1.8L I4	69
S 2.0	71	(Germany) Hans-Dieter Blatzheim	(Germany) Hans-Dieter Blatzheim (Germany) Ernst Kraus	Porsche 907	Porsche 1.9L Flat-6	56
P 3.0	60	(Italy) Autodelta SpA	(United Kingdom) Piers Courage (Italy) Andrea de Adamich	Alfa Romeo T33/3	Alfa Romeo 3.0L V8	54
S 5.0	7	(United Kingdom) Grand Bahama Racing Team	(United Kingdom) Mike De Udy (United Kingdom) Frank Gardner	Lola T70 Mk.3B	Chevrolet 5.0L V8	26
P 3.0	59	(United Kingdom) Ecurie Evergreen	(United Kingdom) Chris Craft (United Kingdom) Trevor Taylor	McLaren M8C	Ford-Cosworth DFV 3.0L V8	25
S 5.0	82	(United Kingdom) Daren Cars Ltd.	(United Kingdom) Jeremy Richardson (United Kingdom) Peter Brown	Daren Mk.2	Ford-Cosworth FVC 1.8L I4	12
P 2.0	75	(United Kingdom) Chevron Racing Team	(United Kingdom) John Hine (United Kingdom) Ian Skailes	Chevron B16	Ford-Cosworth FVC 1.8L I4	9
S 5.0	7	(United Kingdom) Grand Bahama Racing Team	(United Kingdom) Barrie Smith (New Zealand) Howden Ganley	Lola T70 Mk.3B	Chevrolet 5.0L V8	0

== Statistics ==
- Pole position: #2 SpA Ferrari SEFAC Ferrari 512S Spyder (Chris Amon/Arturo Merzario)- 1:28.6 (107.723 mph/174.081 km/h)
- Time taken for winning car to cover distance: 6 hours 45 minutes 29.6 seconds
- Average Speed: 148.296 km/h (91.540 mph)
- Weather conditions: Heavy rain, windy, cold

World Sportscar Championship
Previous race: 12 Hours of Sebring	1970 season	Next race: 1000km of Monza
