= 1970 1000 km of Monza =

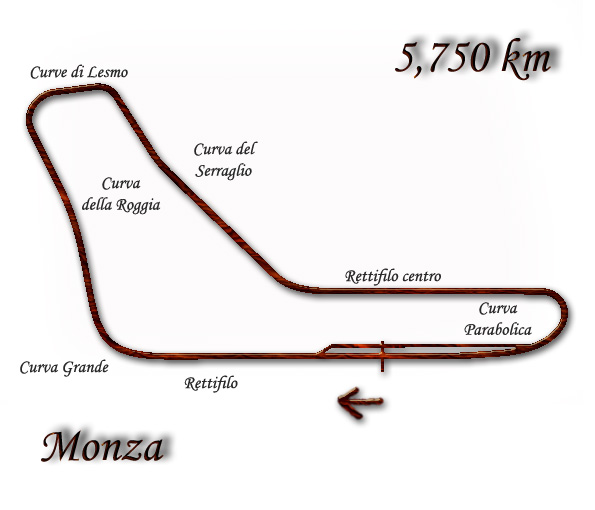
Monza in 1970

The 1970 1000 km of Monza was an endurance race held at the Autodromo Nazionale Monza in Monza, Italy, on April 25, 1970. It was the fourth round of the 1970 International Championship for Makes. This was the first official 1000 km race at Monza that used only the road course; in 1956 and 1965-1969 the organizers utilized the combined road and banking courses; but the banking was abandoned because of safety issues; the 1969 1000 km race was the last race ever held on the concrete-surfaced banking. Mexican driver Pedro Rodríguez won this race in John Wyer's Gulf-sponsored Porsche 917K, he was able to hold off 3 hard-charging works Ferrari 512's after his co-driver Leo Kinnunen lost most of the lead Rodríguez had built up. Ex-Ferrari driver John Surtees returned to Ferrari after 4 years to drive a works 512.

== Official results ==
Pos	Class	No	Team	Drivers	Chassis	Engine	Laps
1	S 5.0	7	(United Kingdom) John Wyer Automotive Engineering	(Mexico) Pedro Rodríguez (Finland) Leo Kinnunen	Porsche 917K	Porsche 4.5L Flat-12	174
2	S 5.0	3	(Italy) SpA Ferrari SEFAC	(Italy) Ignazio Giunti (Italy) Nino Vaccarella	Ferrari 512S Spyder	Ferrari 5.0L V12	174
3	S 5.0	2	(Italy) SpA Ferrari SEFAC	(United Kingdom) John Surtees (Switzerland) Peter Schetty	Ferrari 512S	Ferrari 5.0L V12	171
4	S 5.0	1	(Italy) SpA Ferrari SEFAC	(New Zealand) Chris Amon (Italy) Arturo Merzario	Ferrari 512S	Ferrari 5.0L V12	171
5	P 3.0	36	(France) Equipe Matra-Simca	(France) Jean-Pierre Beltoise (Australia) Jack Brabham	Matra-Simca MS650	Matra 3.0L V12	169
6	P 3.0	37	(France) Equipe Matra-Simca	(France) Henri Pescarolo (France) Johnny Servoz-Gavin	Matra-Simca MS650	Matra 3.0L V12	161
7	P 3.0	38	(Italy) Autodelta SpA	(Italy) Nanni Galli (Germany) Rolf Stommelen	Alfa Romeo T33/3	Alfa Romeo 3.0L V8	166
8	S 5.0	4	(Switzerland) Scuderia Filipinetti	(United Kingdom) Mike Parkes (Switzerland) Herbert Müller	Ferrari 512S	Ferrari 5.0L V12	163
9	S 5.0	5	(Italy) Scuderia Pinchio Rosso	(Italy) Corrado Manfredini (Italy) Gianpiero Moretti	Ferrari 512S	Ferrari 5.0L V12	163
10	S 5.0	12	(Germany) Gesipa Racing Team	(Germany) Jürgen Neuhaus (Germany) Helmut Kelleners	Porsche 917K	Porsche 4.5L Flat-12	162
11	S 5.0	14	(Finland) Racing Team AAW	(Finland) Hans Laine (Netherlands) Gijs van Lennep	Porsche 917K	Porsche 4.5L Flat-12	162
12	S 5.0	8	(United Kingdom) John Wyer Automotive Engineering	(Switzerland) Jo Siffert (United Kingdom) Brian Redman	Porsche 917K	Porsche 4.5L Flat-12	158
13	P 3.0	41	(Italy) Autodelta SpA	(Italy) Andrea de Adamich (United Kingdom) Piers Courage	Alfa Romeo T33/3	Alfa Romeo 3.0L V8	158
14	P 3.0	50	(Germany) Martini International	(France) Gérard Larrousse (Austria) Rudi Lins	Porsche 908/02 LH	Porsche 3.0L Flat-8	157
15	P 2.0	53	(Switzerland) Andre Wicky Racing Team	(Switzerland) Andre Wicky (Portugal) Mário Cabral	Porsche 907	Porsche 1.9L Flat-6	144
16	S 5.0	16	(Belgium) Racing Team VDS	(Belgium) Teddy Pilette (Belgium) Gustave Gosselin	Lola T70 Mk.3B	Chevrolet 5.0L V8	143
17	P 2.0	52	(Germany) Hans-Dieter Blatzheim	(Germany) Hans-Dieter Blatzheim (Germany) Helmut Krause	Porsche 907	Porsche 1.9L Flat-6	139
18	P 3.0	39	(Italy) Autodelta SpA	(United States) Masten Gregory (Netherlands) Toine Hezemans	Alfa Romeo T33/3	Alfa Romeo 3.0L V8	131
19	P 3.0	25	(United Kingdom) John L'Amie	(United Kingdom) John L'Amie (United Kingdom) Brian Nelson	Porsche 910	Porsche 1.9L Flat-6	131
20	GT; 2.0	87	(Italy) Brescia Corse	(Italy) Giuseppe Schenetti (Italy) Sergio Zerbini	Porsche 911S	Porsche 2.0L Flat-6	128
21	GT; 2.0	84	(Switzerland) Andre Wicky Racing Team	(France) Sylvain Garant (Italy) Mario Ilotte	Porsche 911S	Porsche 2.0L Flat-6	127
22	GT +2.0	70	(Italy) Giancarlo Rondanini	(Italy) Giancarlo Rondanini (Italy) Ennio Bonomelli	Porsche 911S	Porsche 2.0L Flat-6	122

=== Not Classified ===
Class	No	Team	Drivers	Chassis	Engine	Laps
GT +2.0	94	(Italy) Jolly Club	(Italy) Luigi Cabella (Italy) Paolo de Leonibus	Alfa Romeo GTA	Alfa Romeo 1.6L I4	118
GT; 2.0	78	(Italy) Fiorenzo Genta	(Italy) Fiorenzo Genta (Italy) "Nicky"	Porsche 911S	Porsche 2.0L Flat-6	118
S 1.6	34	Abarth Switzerland	(Switzerland) Rolando Vaglio (Switzerland) Silvio Vaglio	Fiat-Abarth 1000S	Abarth 1.0L I4	115

=== Did Not Finish ===
Class	No	Team	Drivers	Chassis	Engine	Laps
P 2.0	52	(Italy) Antonio Nicodemi	(Italy) Antonio Nicodemi (United Kingdom) Jonathan Williams	Porsche 907	Porsche 1.9L Flat-6	111
S 1.6	34	(Italy) Mario Nardari	(Italy) Mario Nardari (Italy) "Pal Joe"	Fiat-Abarth 1000S	Abarth 1.0L I4	107
S 5.0	10	(Austria) Porsche Salzburg	(United Kingdom) Vic Elford (Germany) Kurt Ahrens Jr.	Porsche 917K	Porsche 4.5L Flat-12	92
GT; 1.6	23	(Italy) Abarth-Osella	(Austria) Johannes Ortner (Italy) Mario Casoni	Abarth 2000S	Abarth 2.0L I4	71
GT; 1.6	96	(Italy) Citta dei Mille	(Italy) Giulio Rossi (Italy) Paolo Monti	Alfa Romeo GTA	Alfa Romeo 1.6L I4	71
P 3.0	40	(Italy) Autodelta SpA	(Italy) Carlo Facetti (Italy) Teodoro Zeccoli	Alfa Romeo T33/3	Alfa Romeo 3.0L V8	67
S 5.0	10	(Austria) Porsche Salzburg	(Germany) Hans Herrmann (United Kingdom) Richard Attwood	Porsche 917K	Porsche 4.5L Flat-12	63
P 2.0	48	(Italy) SCAR Autostrada	(Italy) "Nicor" (Italy) Spartaco Dini	Alfa Romeo T33/2	Alfa Romeo 2.0L V8	58
S 5.0	11	(United Kingdom) David Piper	(United States) Tony Adamowicz (United Kingdom) David Piper	Porsche 917K	Porsche 4.5L Flat-12	55
P 3.0	44	(Germany) Martini International	(Germany) Gerhard Koch (Germany) Hans-Dieter Dechent	Porsche 908/02	Porsche 3.0L Flat-8	35
GT; 1.6	96	(Italy) Monzeglio	(Italy) Cesare Poretti (Italy) Maurizio Zanetti	Alfa Romeo GTA	Alfa Romeo 1.6L I4	26
P 2.0	48	(Italy) SCAR Autostrada	(Italy) Giovanni Alberti (Italy) Carlo Zuccoli	Alfa Romeo T33/2	Alfa Romeo 2.0L V8	19
GT +2.0	78	(Germany) Kremer Racing	(Germany) Erwin Kremer (Germany) Willi Kauhsen	Porsche 911S	Porsche 2.0L Flat-6	17

== Statistics ==
- Pole position: #8 John Wyer Automotive Engineering Porsche 917K (Jo Siffert/Brian Redman) - 1:25.21 (150.971 mph/242.957 km/h)
- Fastest lap: #10 Porsche Salzburg Porsche 917K (Vic Elford)- 1:24.8 (151.719 mph/244.104 km/h)
- Time taken for winning car to cover scheduled distance: 4 hours, 18 minutes and 1.7 seconds
- Average Speed: 232.649 km/h (143.610 mph)
- Weather conditions: Sunny

World Sportscar Championship
Previous race: 1000km of Brands Hatch	1970 season	Next race: Targa Florio
