= Matra MS620 =

- Category: Group 6
- Constructor: Matra
- Predecessor: Matra MS610
- Successor: Matra-Simca MS630

Technical specifications
- Chassis: Tubular space frame
- Engine: BRM 1,915 cc (116.9 cu in) 16 valve, DOHC V8, naturally aspirated, mid engined Ford 289 cu in (4,736 cc) 16 valve, OHV V8, naturally aspirated
- Transmission: ZF 5DS 25 5-speed manual
- Tyres: Firestone

Competition history
- Notable entrants: Matra-Sports
- Debut: 1966 1000km of Monza
| Races | Wins | Poles |
|---|---|---|
| 8 (10 entries) | 1 | 1 |
- Teams' Championships: 0
- Constructors' Championships: 0
- Drivers' Championships: 0

The Matra MS620 (sometimes referred to as the M620) was a Group 6 sports prototype built by Matra in 1966, and was the second such car built by the company. Fitted with a 1.9 litre version of the BRM Formula One V8 engine, four cars were built, but were mostly used as developmental cars. In 1967, the MS620 was replaced by the 3 litre Matra MS630, although it was used in the Le Mans Test of that year, fitted with a 4.7 litre Ford V8 engine.

== Racing history ==
In 1966, Matra decided to build their second sports prototype. Designed to Group 6 regulations, the car was named the MS620, and featured a 1.9 litre version of the BRM Formula One V8 engine capable of producing 245 hp (183 kW; 248 PS) at 9,000 RPM. Four cars were built, with a tubular steel chassis designed by Bernard Boyer, formerly of Alpine, and bodywork by French carrosserie Pichon-Parat. The car made its first appearance at the Le Mans Test in April 1966, setting the tenth fastest time in the hands of Jo Schlesser, Jean-Pierre Jaussaud and Johnny Servoz-Gavin. The MS620 made its racing debut at the 1000 km of Monza, which was the third round of the World Sportscar Championship; Servoz-Gavin and Jassaud shared the sole MS620 present (a second entry, with Ernesto Brambilla earmarked to drive it, never materialized) but were not classified. Matra's next entry came at the 1000 km of Spa, where Servoz-Gavin was joined by Alan Rees, but a fuel system issue prevented the pair from finishing the race. Both drivers were entered for the 1000 km of Nürburgring, but did not race.

For the 24 Hours of Le Mans, Matra entered three MS620s, with Jassaud and Henri Pescarolo in car #02, Schlesser and Rees in car #03, and Jean-Pierre Beltoise and Servoz-Gavin in car #04. All three cars retired; car #02 with engine failure after 38 laps, car #03 after an accident after 100 laps, and car #01 after a gearbox failure on lap 112. Matra then entered Beltoise at the Trophée d'Auvergne non-championship event, where he finished in 17th and last place following a battery failure after 11 laps. Beltoise then drove an MS620 in another non-championship event at Magny-Cours, which he won. Matra then attempted to enter Schlesser at the Hockenheim Grand Prix, but did not attend the event. Instead, the car's next race came at the non-championship Coupe de Paris, where Servoz-Gavin took second place. Beltoise next drove an MS620 in the Coupes du Salon, but he crashed during the event. Matra finished the season by entering two cars in the 1000 km of Paris; Jassaud and Pescarolo in one, with Beltoise and Servoz-Gavin in the other. Again, neither car finished, as the car of Beltoise and Servoz-Gavin crashed after 14 laps, and ignition problems forced Jaussaud and Pescarolo out on lap 43. This would be the car's last race, although Jassaud and Roby Weber did set the eighth fastest time at the Le Mans Test in 1967, the BRM engine having been replaced by a 4.7 litre Ford V8 capable of producing 385 hp (287 kW; 390 PS) at 6,500 rpm. Weber died in an accident whilst driving the MS620's replacement, the Matra MS630.
