= Matra-Simca MS650 =

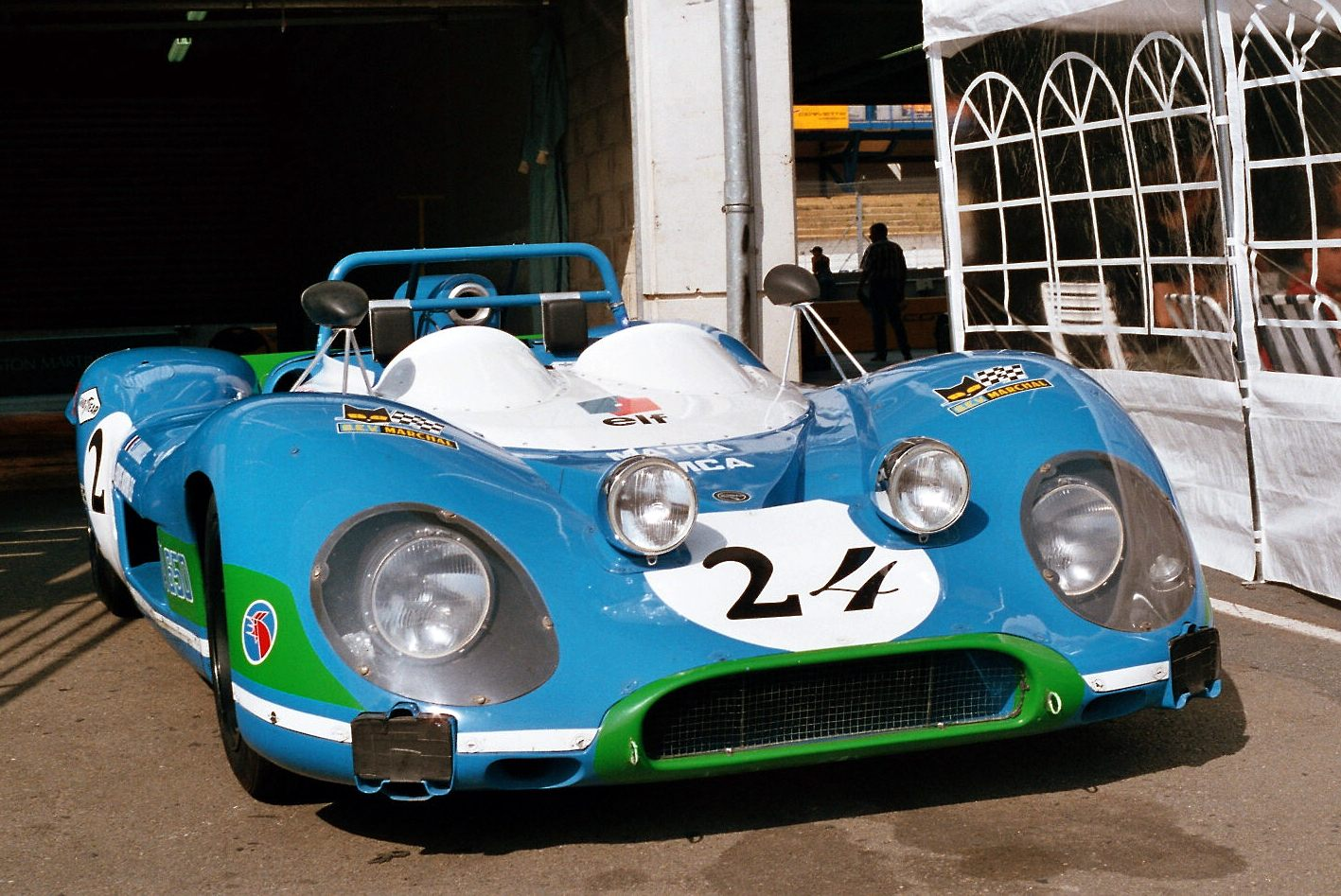
- Category: Group 6 Prototype
- Constructor: Matra
- Designer: Bernard Boyer
- Predecessor: MS630 / MS640
- Successor: MS660

Technical specifications
- Chassis: Glass-fibre reinforced plastic panels
- Suspension (front): Double wishbones, coil springs over dampers
- Suspension (rear): Double wishbones, coil springs over dampers
- Length: 3,900 mm (153.5 in)
- Width: 1,900 mm (74.8 in)
- Height: 760 mm (29.9 in)
- Axle track: Front: 1,440 mm (56.7 in); Rear: 1,490 mm (58.7 in)
- Wheelbase: 2,440 mm (96.1 in)
- Engine: Matra MS12, 2,993 cc (182.6 cu in), 60º V12, NA, Longitudinal, mid-mounted
- Transmission: Matra 5-speed manual
- Weight: 740 kg (1,631.4 lb)
- Fuel: Elf

Competition history
- Notable entrants: Equipe Matra - Elf; Matra of France; Matra Sports; Equipe Matra-Simca
- Notable drivers: (France) Jean-Pierre Beltoise (Mexico) Pedro Rodriguez (France) Johnny Servoz-Gavin (Australia) Jack Brabham (France) François Cevert (France) Jean-Pierre Beltoise (France) Henri Pescarolo (United States) Dan Gurney
- Debut: 1969 24 Hours of Le Mans
Races	Wins	Poles	F/Laps
8	0	0	0
- Teams' Championships: 0
- Constructors' Championships: 0

The Matra-Simca MS650 is a Group 6 prototype race car introduced in 1969 for the International Championship for Makes. The MS650 replaced the previous Matra-Simca MS630.

== Racing history ==
=== 1969 ===
The car made its debut at the 1969 24 Hours of Le Mans with a four car entry. Jean-Pierre Beltoise/Piers Courage in the MS650, Jean Guichet/Nino Vaccarella in the MS630, Nanni Galli/Robin Widdows and Johnny Servoz-Gavin/Herbert Müller were both in the MS630/650. Beltoise/Courage finished fourth followed by Guichet/Vaccarella in fifth, Galli/Widdows seventh but Servoz-Gavin/Müller retired when an electrical circuit failed. For the 1969 6 Hours of Watkins Glen, Matra entered two cars for Servoz-Gavin/Pedro Rodriguez in the MS650 and Guichet/Widdows in the MS630/650. Servoz-Gavin/Rodriguez finished fourth and Guichet/Widdows retired with a broken clutch. For the final race of the 1969 season, the 1000km of Zeltweg, Matra only entered Servoz-Gavin/Rodriguez but the car retired through accident.

In the International Championship for Makes, Matra had scored six points, earning it fifth place in the championship.

=== 1970 ===
The first race of the season was the 1970 24 Hours of Daytona, Matra had two cars for Jack Brabham/François Cevert and Jean-Pierre Beltoise/Henri Pescarolo. Brabham/Cevert finished tenth and Beltoise/Pescarolo finished 18th. Matra made changes to the driver line ups for the 12 Hours of Sebring, Pescarolo/Servoz-Gavin and Cevert/Dan Gurney. Pescarolo/Servoz-Gavin finished fifth and Cevert/Gurney finish 12th. Matra again made changes to the driver line ups for the 1000km of Brands Hatch, The team put Brabham/Beltoise together but kept Pescarolo/Servoz-Gavin. Brabham/Beltoise finish 12th and Pescarolo/Servoz-Gavin retired with engine failure. The MNZ saw Brabham/Beltoise fifth followed by Pescarolo/Servoz-Gavin in sixth. The team skipped the next three races, the Targa Florio, 1000km of Spa-Francorchamps and 1000km of Nürburgring. The team entered three cars for the 24 Hours of Le Mans Beltoise/Pescarolo in the new Matra-Simca MS660, Brabham/Cevert and Patrick Depailler/Jean-Pierre Jabouille/Tim Schenken were both in the MS650 but all three cars retired with engine failure. The team skipped the final two race of the 1970 season, the Watkins Glen 6 Hours and Austrian 1000km.

In the International Championship for Makes, Matra had scored four points, earning it fourth place in the championship.

== Complete International Championship for Makes results ==
Year	Entrant	Class	Drivers	1	2	3	4	5	6	7	8	9	10	Points	ICMP
1969	Equipe Matra - Elf	Group 5		DAY	SEB	BHC	MZA	TGA	SPA	NÜR	LMS	WGN	ORC	6	5th
1969	Equipe Matra - Elf	Group 5	(France) Jean-Pierre Beltoise								4			6	5th
1969	Equipe Matra - Elf	Group 5	(United Kingdom) Piers Courage								4			6	5th
1969	Matra of France; Matra Sports	Group 5	(Mexico) Pedro Rodriguez									4	23	6	5th
1969	Matra of France; Matra Sports	Group 5	(France) Johnny Servoz-Gavin									4	23	6	5th
1970	Equipe Matra-Simca	Group 5		DAY	SEB	BHC	MZA	TGA	SPA	NÜR	LMS	WGN	ORC	4	4th
1970	Equipe Matra-Simca	Group 5	(Australia) Jack Brabham	10		12	5				36			4	4th
1970	Equipe Matra-Simca	Group 5	(France) François Cevert	10	12						36			4	4th
1970	Equipe Matra-Simca	Group 5	(United States) Dan Gurney		12									4	4th
1970	Equipe Matra-Simca	Group 5	(France) Jean-Pierre Beltoise	18		12	5							4	4th
1970	Equipe Matra-Simca	Group 5	(France) Henri Pescarolo	18	5	21	6							4	4th
1970	Equipe Matra-Simca	Group 5	(France) Johnny Servoz-Gavin		5	21	6							4	4th
1970	Equipe Matra-Simca	Group 5	(France) Patrick Depailler								37			4	4th
1970	Equipe Matra-Simca	Group 5	(France) Jean-Pierre Jabouille								37			4	4th
1970	Equipe Matra-Simca	Group 5	(Australia) Tim Schenken								37			4	4th
