= Matra MS6 =

The Matra MS6 was an open-wheel Formula 2 racing car, designed, developed and built by Matra in 1966.

The MS6 were used by Matra International in Formula 2 in 1966. Matra International was managed by Ken Tyrrell and the aim was to break the dominance of the Brabham Formula Two cars. The configuration of the MS6 corresponded to the Matra MS5 from Formula 3. In some sources, the Formula 2 Matras are therefore also referred to as MS5. Officially, however, Matra used the MS6 typology to be able to distinguish between the vehicles.

The car had a stable chassis and Matra International used a Cosworth four-cylinder unit as the engine. Some privateers - the car was also sold to private teams - relied on BRM engines.

Only Brabham cars won until the last race of the season. Only at the last race of the year did Matra win for the first time. At the German Grand Prix at the Nürburgring, the starting field was supplemented by Formula 2 cars. The rating in this racing formula ended with a triple victory for the MS6. Jean-Pierre Beltoise won ahead of Hubert Hahne and Jo Schlesser.
