= Matra MS1 =

Matra MS1/MS2
- Category: Formula Three
- Constructor: Matra Sports
- Designer(s): Paul Carillo
- Successor: Matra MS5

Technical specifications
- Chassis: Aluminium monocoque
- Suspension (front): double wishbones, coil springs over dampers, anti-roll bar
- Suspension (rear): reversed lower wishbones, single top links, twin radius arms, coil springs over dampers, anti-roll bar
- Engine: Cosworth MAE 997 cc (60.8 cu in) L4, naturally aspirated, mid-mounted.
- Transmission: Hewland TL 200 5-speed

Competition history
- Notable entrants: Matra Sports
- Notable drivers: (France) Jean-Pierre Jaussaud (France) Eric Offenstadt (France) Jean-Pierre Beltoise (France) Henri Pescarolo
Races	Wins	Poles	F/Laps
13	5	1	3

The Matra MS1 (abbreviation of Matra-Sports-1 ) was Matra's first open-wheel formula racing car, built in 1965 to compete in Formula Three. Along with its derivative the MS2 it won five races and powered Jean-Pierre Beltoise to the French Formula Three championship.

== Development ==
The MS1 was designed as a conventional formula racing car. Since Matra wanted to quickly achieve success in international motorsport, as much as possible was copied from the British Formula Three racing cars of the time. The vehicle had conventional wheel suspension and a Cosworth engine. This was an innovation insofar as the previous racing cars, which were still designed under the leadership of René Bonnet, had Renault engines in the rear.

The MS1 was a test car that was used to explore the technical possibilities in Formula Three. The tanks were moved to the side panels, supported by crossbars. This design ensured the excellent stability of the racing cars. During a thorough inspection, aerospace technicians from Matra found leaks in the tanks and had them sealed by mechanics. This method was used time and time again on the Matra and ensured that problems with leaking tanks were extremely rare.

It was powered by a naturally aspirated, 997 cc (60.8 cu in), Cosworth MAE inline four-cylinder engine, producing 100 hp (75 kW), mated to a 5-speed Hewland T.L.200 manual transmission, that drove the rear wheels. The body is constructed out of lightweight fiberglass, and the chassis is an aluminum monocoque.

== Race history ==
The MS1 made its first appearance at Monte Carlo in May 1965, with two cars entered by Matra Sports and driven by Jean-Pierre Jaussaud and Eric Offenstadt. Jaussaud was fifteenth and Offenstadt failed to finish. Thereafter, both the MS1 and the MS2 competed regularly in Formula Three events, scoring its first win at Reims in July, and at the end of the season Jean-Pierre Beltoise had secured three wins and Jaussaud two, and in the Formula Three Championnat de France Beltoise and Jaussaud were winner and runner-up respectively.

The cars were then retired and the Matra MS5 introduced for 1966.
