= 1969 World Sportscar Championship =

Racing tournament

Seasons
- ← 1968 1970 →

The 1969 World Sportscar Championship season was the 17th season of FIA World Sportscar Championship motor racing. It featured the 1969 International Championship for Makes, which was a series for FIA Group 6 Prototype Sports Cars, Group 4 Sports Cars and Group 3 Grand Touring Cars and the 1969 International Cup for GT Cars, which was restricted to Group 3 Grand Touring Cars. The season ran from 1 February 1969 to 10 August 1969 and comprised 10 races.

Porsche won both the International Championship for Makes and the International Cup for GT Cars.

== Schedule ==
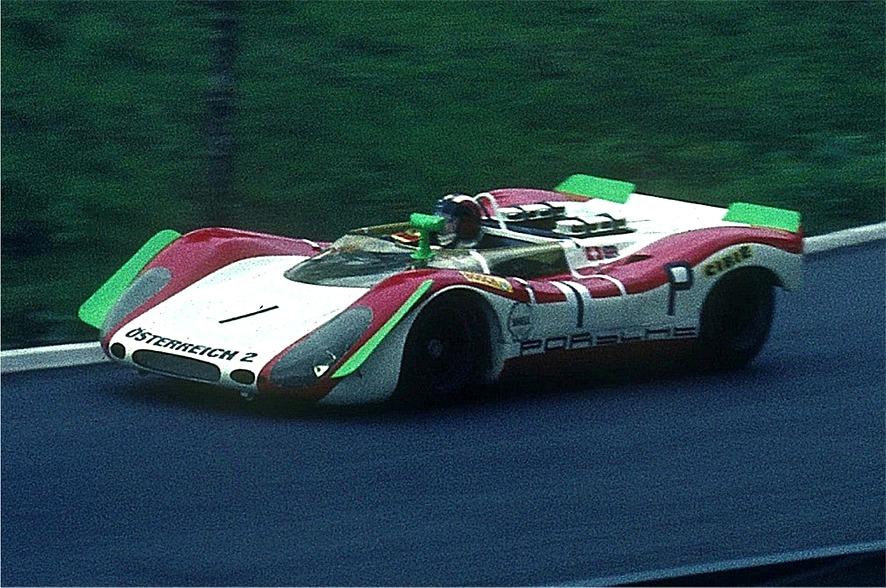
Porsche won the 1969 International Championship for Makes with the Porsche 908

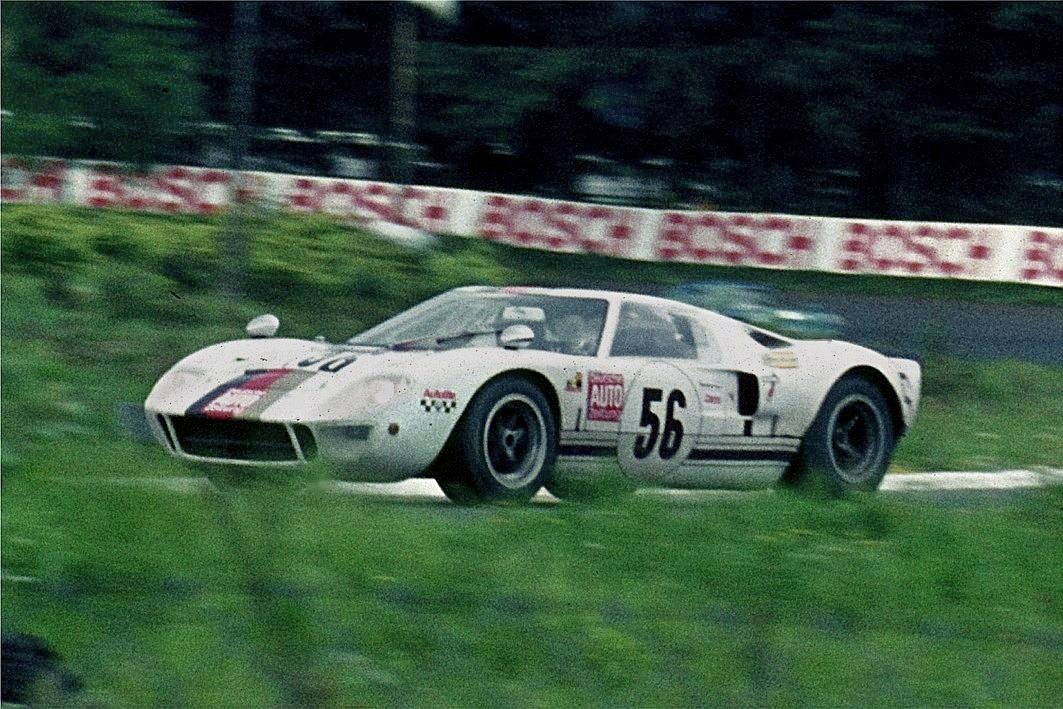
Ford placed second with the Ford GT40

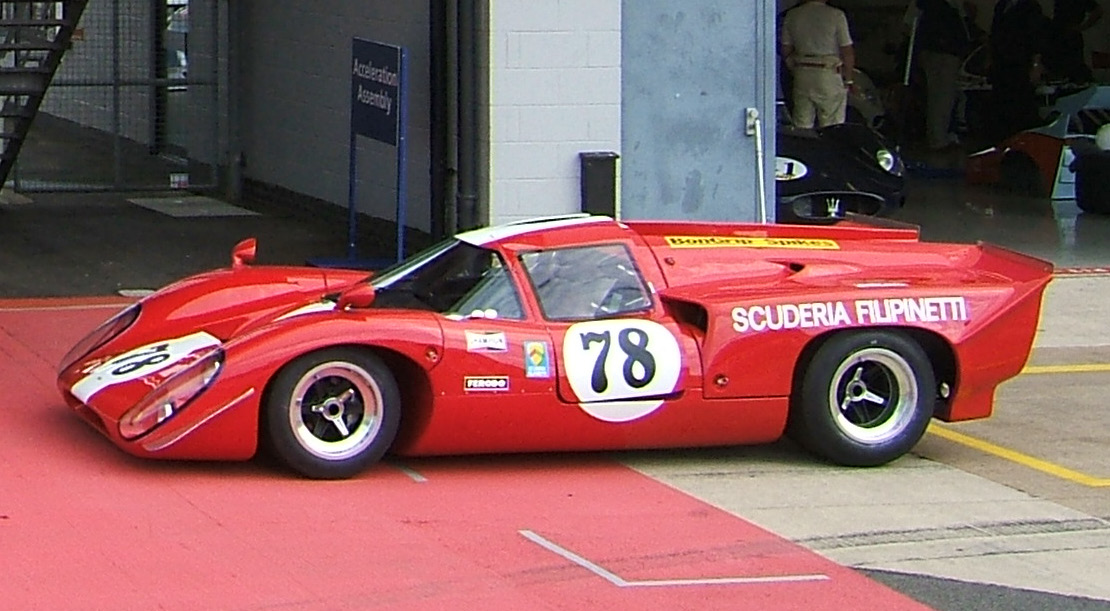
Lola placed third with the Lola T70

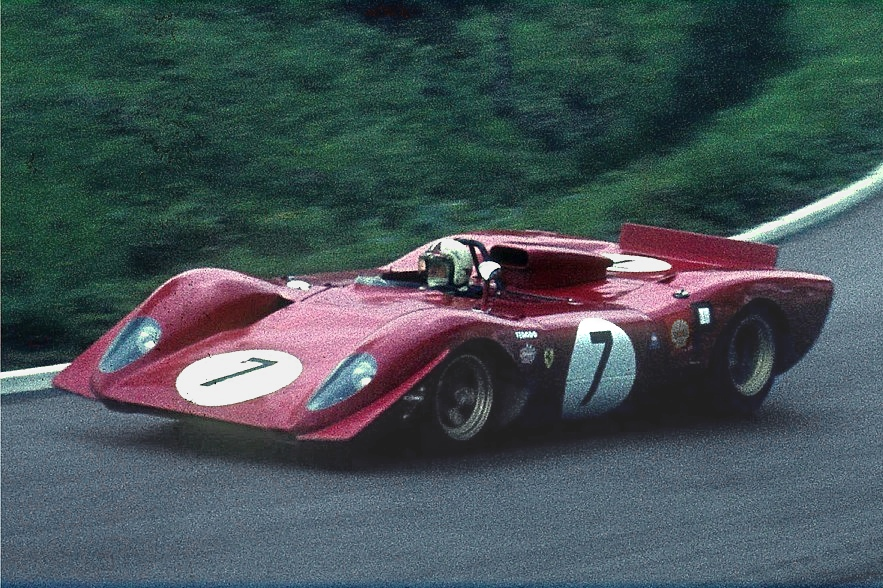
Ferrari placed fourth with the Ferrari 312P

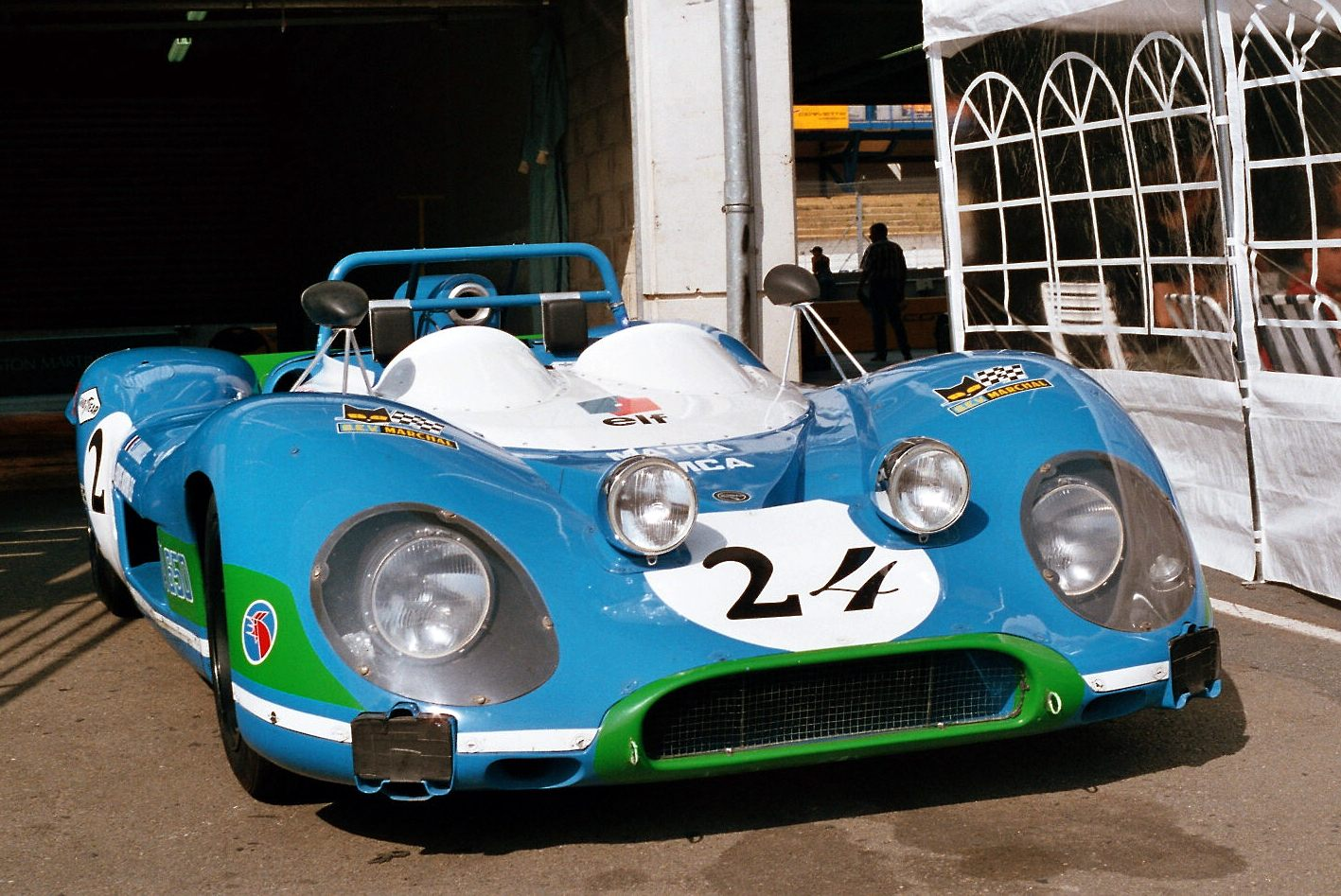
Matra placed fifth with the Matra MS650

Rnd	Race	Circuit or Location	Date
1	(United States) 24 Hours of Daytona	Daytona International Speedway	1 February; 2 February
2	(United States) 12 Hours of Sebring	Sebring International Raceway	22 March
3	(United Kingdom) BOAC 500 (6 Hours)^{†}	Brands Hatch	13 April
4	(Italy) 1000km Monza	Autodromo Nazionale Monza	25 April
5	(Italy) Targa Florio	Circuito delle Madonie	4 May
6	(Belgium) 1000km Spa	Circuit de Spa-Francorchamps	11 May
7	(Germany) ADAC 1000 Kilometres Nürburgring	Nürburgring	1 June
8	(France) 24 Hours of Le Mans	Circuit de la Sarthe	14 June; 15 June
9	(United States) Watkins Glen 6 Hours	Watkins Glen International	12 July
10	(Austria) 1000km of Zeltweg	Österreichring	10 August

† - Sportscars & Sports Prototypes only, GT category did not participate.

== Race results ==
Rnd	Circuit	Winning team - Outright	Winning team - GT	Results
Rnd	Circuit	Winning drivers - Outright	Winning drivers - GT	Results
Rnd	Circuit	Winning car - Outright	Winning car - GT	Results
1	Daytona	(United States) #6 Roger Penske Racing	(United States) #20 Herb Watson	Results
1	Daytona	(United States) Mark Donohue (United States) Chuck Parsons	(United States) Herb Watson (United States) Tony Adamowicz (United States) Bruce Jennings	Results
1	Daytona	Lola T70 Mk3B Chevrolet	Porsche 911T	Results
2	Sebring	(United Kingdom) #22 John Wyer Automotive	(United States) #5 Best Photo Service	Results
2	Sebring	(Belgium) Jacky Ickx (United Kingdom) Jackie Oliver	(United States) Don Yenko (United States) Bob Grossman	Results
2	Sebring	Ford GT40	Chevrolet Camaro	Results
3	Brands Hatch	(Germany) #53 Porsche Engineering	None	Results
3	Brands Hatch	(Switzerland) Jo Siffert (United Kingdom) Brian Redman		Results
3	Brands Hatch	Porsche 908/2		Results
4	Monza	(Germany) #4 Porsche Engineering	(Germany) #67 IGFA	Results
4	Monza	(Switzerland) Jo Siffert (United Kingdom) Brian Redman	(Germany) Jürgen Neuhaus (Germany) Dieter Fröhlich	Results
4	Monza	Porsche 908L	Porsche 911T	Results
5	Circuito delle Madonie	(Germany) #266 Porsche Engineering	(Italy) #86 Everardo Ostini	Results
5	Circuito delle Madonie	(Germany) Gerhard Mitter (Germany) Udo Schütz	(Italy) Everardo Ostini (Italy) Gianpiero Moretti	Results
5	Circuito delle Madonie	Porsche 908/2	Porsche 911T	Results
6	Spa-Francorchamps	(Germany) #25 Porsche Engineering	(France) #59 Gérard Larrousse	Results
6	Spa-Francorchamps	(Switzerland) Jo Siffert (United Kingdom) Brian Redman	(France) Gérard Larrousse (Austria) Rudi Lins (Switzerland) Dieter Spoerry	Results
6	Spa-Francorchamps	Porsche 908L	Porsche 911T	Results
7	Nürburgring	(Germany) #1 Porsche Engineering	(Germany) #106 IGFA	Results
7	Nürburgring	(Switzerland) Jo Siffert (United Kingdom) Brian Redman	(Germany) Jürgen Neuhaus (Germany) Dieter Fröhlich	Results
7	Nürburgring	Porsche 908/2	Porsche 911T	Results
8	La Sarthe	(United Kingdom) #6 John Wyer Automotive	(Belgium) #41 Jean-Pierre Gaban	Results
8	La Sarthe	(Belgium) Jacky Ickx (United Kingdom) Jackie Oliver	(Belgium) Jean-Pierre Gaban (Belgium) Yves Deprez	Results
8	La Sarthe	Ford GT40	Porsche 911S	Results
9	Watkins Glen	#1 Porsche of Austria	(United States) #14 Owens Corning Racing	Results
9	Watkins Glen	(Switzerland) Jo Siffert (United Kingdom) Brian Redman	(United States) Tony DeLorenzo (United States) Dick Lang	Results
9	Watkins Glen	Porsche 908/2	Chevrolet Corvette	Results
10	Österreichring	(Austria) #29 Freiherr von Wendt	(Germany) #27 Peter-Ernst Stähle	Results
10	Österreichring	(Switzerland) Jo Siffert (Germany) Kurt Ahrens Jr.	(Germany) Herbert Linge (Germany) Roland Bauer	Results
10	Österreichring	Porsche 917	Porsche 911T	Results

== Points system ==
Points were awarded to the top six finishers in each race on a 9-6-4-3-2-1 basis. Manufacturers were only given points for their highest finishing car in each race with no points awarded for positions gained by any other cars from that manufacturer.

Sports, Sports Prototype and GT cars were eligible to score points for their manufacturer in the overall championship and the GT category also had its own separate award.

Cars that were not included in the Sports, Sports Prototype or GT categories in a race were not eligible to score points for the overall championship.

Only the best five points finishes counted towards a manufacturer's total, with any other points earned being discarded. Discarded points are shown within brackets in the tables below.

== Championship Standings ==
=== International Championship for Makes ===
Pos	Manufacturer	Rd 1	Rd 2	Rd 3	Rd 4	Rd 5	Rd 6	Rd 7	Rd 8	Rd 9	Rd 10	Total
1	(Germany) Porsche	(4)	(4)	9	9	9	9	9	(6)	(9)	(9)	45
2	(United States) Ford		9	2	3			(1)	9	2		25
3	(United Kingdom) Lola	9	1		2		2				6	20
4	(Italy) Ferrari		6	3			6					15
5	(France) Matra								3	3		6
6	(United Kingdom) Chevron	3										3
7	(Italy) Alfa Romeo					2	1					3
8	(France) Alpine-Renault				1							1

=== International Cup for GT Cars ===
The GT class did not participate in Round 3.

Pos	Manufacturer	Rd 1	Rd 2	Rd 4	Rd 5	Rd 6	Rd 7	Rd 8	Rd 9	Rd 10	Total
1	(Germany) Porsche	9	(6)	9	9	9	9	(9)	(6)	(9)	45
2	(United States) Chevrolet	3	9			3			9		24
3	(Italy) Ferrari	1				6					7
4	(Italy) Lancia			3	2						5
5	(United Kingdom) MG	2									2

== The cars ==
The following models contributed to the nett points totals of their respective manufacturers:

=== International Championship for Makes ===
- Porsche 908/2 & 908L
- Ford GT40
- Lola T70 Mk.3B & T70 Mk.3 Chevrolet
- Ferrari 312P
- Matra MS650
- Chevron B8 BMW
- Alfa Romeo T33/2
- Alpine-Renault A220

=== International Cup for GT Cars ===
- Porsche 911T
- Chevrolet Corvette & Camaro
- Ferrari 275GTB/C
- Lancia Fulvia HF Zagato
- MGB
