= Matra MS5 =

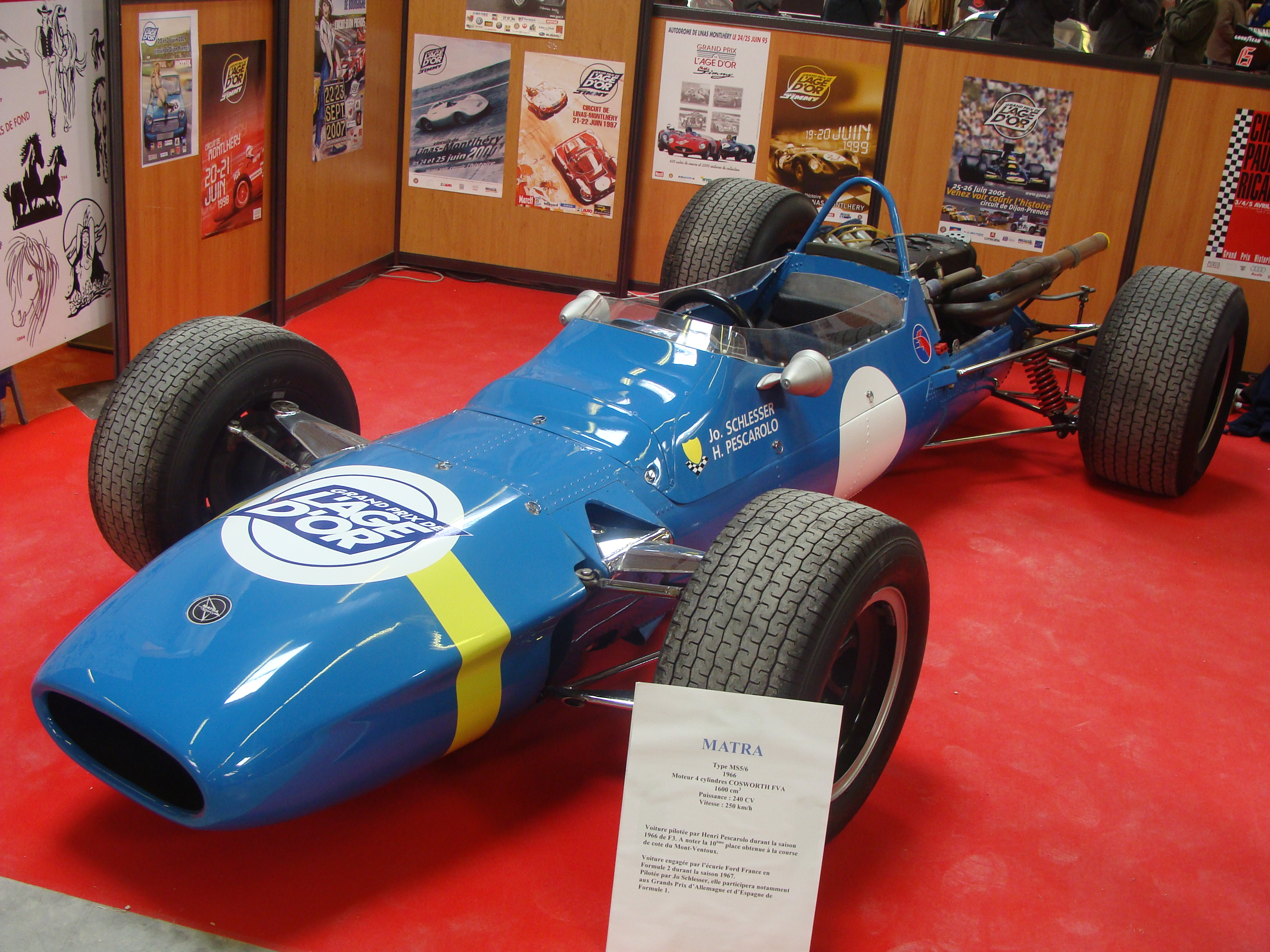
- A MS5 on display in 2008
- Category: Formula One; Formula Two; Formula Three
- Constructor: Matra Sports
- Successor: Matra MS7

Technical specifications
- Chassis: Aluminium monocoque, with engine as a fully stressed member.
- Engine: Ford Cosworth FVA, Ford Cosworth SCA, or BRM P80 1,000 cc (61 cu in) L4, naturally aspirated, mid-mounted.
- Transmission: Hewland TL 200 5-speed
- Tyres: Dunlop

Competition history
- Notable entrants: Matra Sports
- Notable drivers: (France) Jean-Pierre Beltoise (France) Johnny Servoz-Gavin (France) Jo Schlesser (Belgium) Jacky Ickx (Germany) Hubert Hahne
- Debut: 1966 German Grand Prix
Races	Wins	Poles	F/Laps
3	0	0	0
- Unless otherwise stated, all data refer to Formula One World Championship Grands Prix only.

The Matra MS5 is a Formula Two and Formula Three racing car, designed, developed, and made by Matra, which was used in the Formula Two class of two World Championship Grands Prix in 1966 and 1967. It was actively used in motor racing competitions between 1965 and 1969.

The MS5 was Matra's final Formula 3 car, based on the MS1 test car. The first two cars were ready just before the Formula 3 race in Monaco. A total of five MS5s were built in 1965, more followed and some remained in racing use until 1969.

The national races in France had absolute priority for Matra. In 1965 Jean-Pierre Beltoise won the French Formula 3 Championship ahead of his teammate Jean-Pierre Jaussaud. In 1966 Beltoise won the important Formula 3 race in Monaco with the MS5. In 1967 the works team dominated the Argentine championship and the two new works drivers Henri Pescarolo and Jean-Pierre Jabouille won the races in Monaco and Rouen. However, at the end of the season, the factory team was disbanded; French private teams bought the factory cars.

Matra managing director Jean-Luc Lagardère had already concluded an agreement with Ken Tyrrell in 1965 in order to enter Formula 2 with the British racing team owner. Tyrrell was given an MS5 with a BRM Formula 2 engine for trial purposes and from 1966 the team entered Formula 2 under the team name Matra International. The MS5 adapted to the regulations ran there under the type designation MS6.

The car made its World Championship Grand Prix debut at the 1966 German Grand Prix, being driven by Belgian Jacky Ickx, and was involved in an accident with John Taylor's Brabham BT11 during the race.

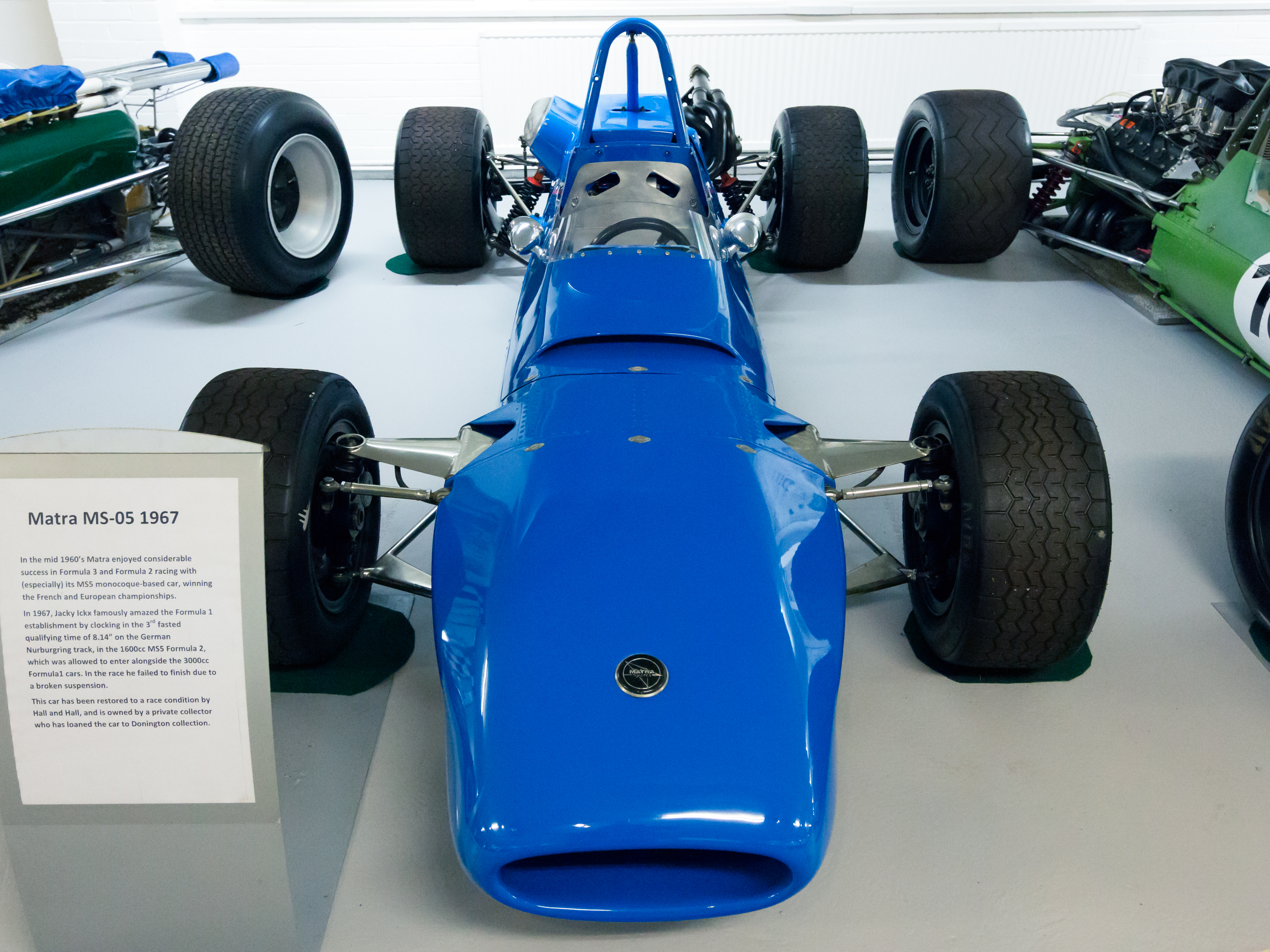
Matra MS5

== Formula One World Championship results ==
(key)(results in bold indicate pole position, results in italics indicate fastest lap)

Year	Entrant	Engine	Tyres	Drivers	1	2	3	4	5	6	7	8	9	10	11	Points	WCC
1966	Matra Sports	Ford Cosworth SCA 1.0 L4	D		MON	BEL	FRA	GBR	NED	GER	ITA	USA	MEX			-	-
1966	Matra Sports	Ford Cosworth SCA 1.0 L4	D	Jean-Pierre Beltoise						8						-	-
1966	Matra Sports	Ford Cosworth SCA 1.0 L4	D	Jo Schlesser						10						-	-
1966	Tyrrell Racing Organisation	Ford Cosworth SCA 1.0 L4	D	Jacky Ickx						Ret						-	-
1966	Tyrrell Racing Organisation	BRM P80 1.0 L4	D	Hubert Hahne						9						-	-
1967	Matra Sports	Ford Cosworth FVA 1.6 L4	D		RSA	MON	NED	BEL	FRA	GBR	GER	CAN	ITA	USA	MEX	0	NC
1967	Matra Sports	Ford Cosworth FVA 1.6 L4	D	Jean-Pierre Beltoise		DNQ										0	NC
1967	Matra Sports	Ford Cosworth FVA 1.6 L4	D	Johnny Servoz-Gavin		Ret										0	NC
1967	Tyrrell Racing Organisation	Ford Cosworth FVA 1.6 L4	D	Jacky Ickx							Ret					-	-
1967	Ecurie Ford-France	Ford Cosworth FVA 1.6 L4	D	Jo Schlesser							Ret					-	-

== Non-Championship Formula One results ==
(key)

Year	Entrant	Engine	Tyres	Drivers	1	2	3	4	5	6
1967	Matra Sports	Ford Cosworth FVA 1.6 L4	D		ROC	SPC	INT	SYR	OUL	ESP
1967	Matra Sports	Ford Cosworth FVA 1.6 L4	D	Jean-Pierre Beltoise	Ret				5	
1967	Matra Sports	Ford Cosworth FVA 1.6 L4	D	Jacky Ickx	Ret					
1967	Matra Sports	Ford Cosworth FVA 1.6 L4	D	Henri Pescarolo					8	
1967	Matra Sports	Ford Cosworth FVA 1.6 L4	D	Johnny Servoz-Gavin						4
1967	Ecurie Ford-France	Ford Cosworth FVA 1.6 L4	D	Jo Schlesser				DNS	4	5
1967	Tyrrell Racing Organisation	Ford Cosworth FVA 1.6 L4	D	Jacky Ickx					Ret	6
