= 1000 km Brands Hatch =

The Brands Hatch 1000 km was an endurance sports car event that was part of the World Sportscar Championship for varying years from 1967 until 1989. Originally a six-hour race running under the name BOAC 500, the event was eventually extended to 1000 kilometres under a number of different sponsorship titles.

== History ==
In 1966, a non-championship sports car race was held at Brands Hatch for a distance of 500 miles, with drivers David Piper and Bob Bondurant easily taking victory in an AC Cobra. With the success of this initial event, the World Sportscar Championship would add Brands Hatch to their calendar, while the British Sports Car Championship replaced their Guards Trophy event. However, unlike the initial race's set distance of 500 miles, the new event would be run for six hours. Even with a timed race, BOAC stepped in as the primary sponsor and chose to retain the 500 mile distance in the name, earning the popular title BOAC 500.

The 1968 race took place on 7 April, a date which will be remembered as that on which Jim Clark, originally expected to take part in the race, instead took part in a Formula 2 race at the Hockenheimring in Germany where he crashed and was killed.

As the speeds of competitors improved during the early years, the drivers would actually set distances beyond even 600 miles. It was therefore decided in 1970 that the event would be extended to a set distance of 1000 kilometres, which was the distance used by five other events in the World Sportscar Championship's calendar. The race, now retitled the BOAC 1000, would continue in this form until it was temporarily dropped from the series in 1973. It would once again be part of the schedule in 1974, but this time with British Airways replacing BOAC as sponsor. The race would however not return again in 1975 and would go on a three-year hiatus.

Following some reconstruction of Brands Hatch in 1976, the World Championship of Makes (split from the World Sportscar Championship) would return to the track in 1977 with a six-hour timed race replacing the 1000 kilometre set distance. The event would skip one more year in 1978, before returning permanently in 1979. The six-hour requirement was abandoned once again in 1981 as the event returned to its familiar 1000 kilometre format, which would continue until 1988. For the final appearance of Brands Hatch on the World Sportscar Championship calendar in 1989, the race would be shortened to 480 kilometres, as would nearly every race that season.

== Winners ==
Year	Drivers	Team	Car
500 Mile distance
1966	(United Kingdom) David Piper (United States) Bob Bondurant	(United Kingdom) The Chequered Flag	AC Cobra
6 Hour distance
1967	(United Kingdom) Mike Spence (United States) Phil Hill	(United States) Chaparral Cars Inc.	Chaparral 2F-Chevrolet
1968	(United Kingdom) Brian Redman (Belgium) Jacky Ickx	(United Kingdom) J.W. Automotive	Ford GT40 Mk.I
1969	(United Kingdom) Brian Redman (Switzerland) Jo Siffert	(West Germany) Porsche System Engineering	Porsche 908/02
1000 km distance
1970	(Mexico) Pedro Rodríguez (Finland) Leo Kinnunen	(United Kingdom) J.W. Automotive Engineering	Porsche 917K
1971	(Italy) Andrea de Adamich (France) Henri Pescarolo	(Italy) Autodelta SpA	Alfa Romeo T33/3
1972	(United States) Mario Andretti (Belgium) Jacky Ickx	(Italy) SpA Ferrari SEFAC	Ferrari 312 PB
1974	(France) Jean-Pierre Beltoise (France) Jean-Pierre Jarier	(France) Equipe Gitanes	Matra-Simca MS670C
6 Hour distance
1977	(Belgium) Jacky Ickx (West Germany) Jochen Mass	(West Germany) Martini Racing	Porsche 935/77
1979	(West Germany) Reinhold Joest (West Germany) Volkert Merl	(West Germany) Joest Racing	Porsche 908/3 Turbo
1980	(Italy) Riccardo Patrese (West Germany) Walter Röhrl	(Italy) Lancia Corse	Lancia Monte Carlo Turbo
1000 km distance
1981	(United Kingdom) Guy Edwards (Spain) Emilio de Villota	(United Kingdom) Team Lola	Lola T600-Ford Cosworth
1982	(Belgium) Jacky Ickx (United Kingdom) Derek Bell	(West Germany) Rothmans Porsche	Porsche 956
1983	(United Kingdom) Derek Warwick (United Kingdom) John Fitzpatrick	(United Kingdom) JDavid Racing Porsche	Porsche 956
1984	(United Kingdom) Jonathan Palmer (Netherlands) Jan Lammers	(United Kingdom) Canon Racing/GTi Engineering	Porsche 956
1985	(West Germany) Hans Joachim Stuck (United Kingdom) Derek Bell	(West Germany) Rothmans Porsche	Porsche 962C
1986	(Italy) Mauro Baldi (France) Bob Wollek	(United Kingdom) Liqui Moly Equipe	Porsche 956 GTi
1987	(Brazil) Raul Boesel (Denmark) John Nielsen	(United Kingdom) Silk Cut Jaguar	Jaguar XJR-8
1988	(United Kingdom) Andy Wallace (United Kingdom) Martin Brundle (Denmark) John Nielsen	(United Kingdom) Silk Cut Jaguar	Jaguar XJR-9
480 km distance
1989	(Italy) Mauro Baldi (United Kingdom) Kenny Acheson	(West Germany) Team Sauber Mercedes	Sauber C9-Mercedes
