= Matra MS610 =

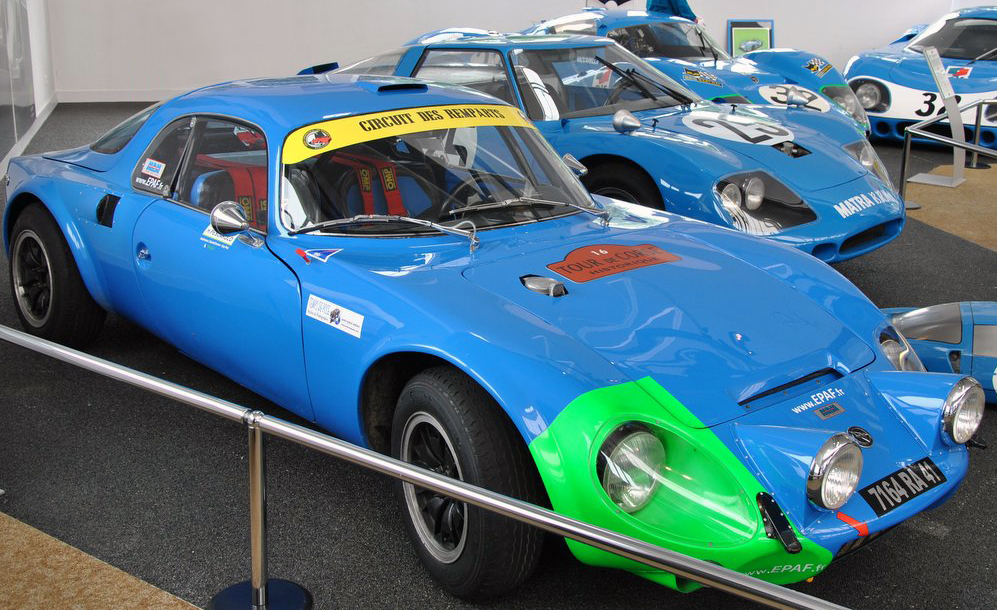
1965 Matra MS610

The Matra MS610 is a lightweight rally car and sports car, designed, developed and built by Matra in 1965. It was Matra's first sports prototype race car. It is powered (depending on the model) by a naturally aspirated, 1.1–1.6 L (67–98 cu in), Ford-Lotus twin-cam four-cylinder engine, which develops between 145–155 hp (108–116 kW); with the whole car only weighing 645 kg (1,422 lb).
