= Herbert Müller (racing driver) =

Swiss racing driver (1940–1981)

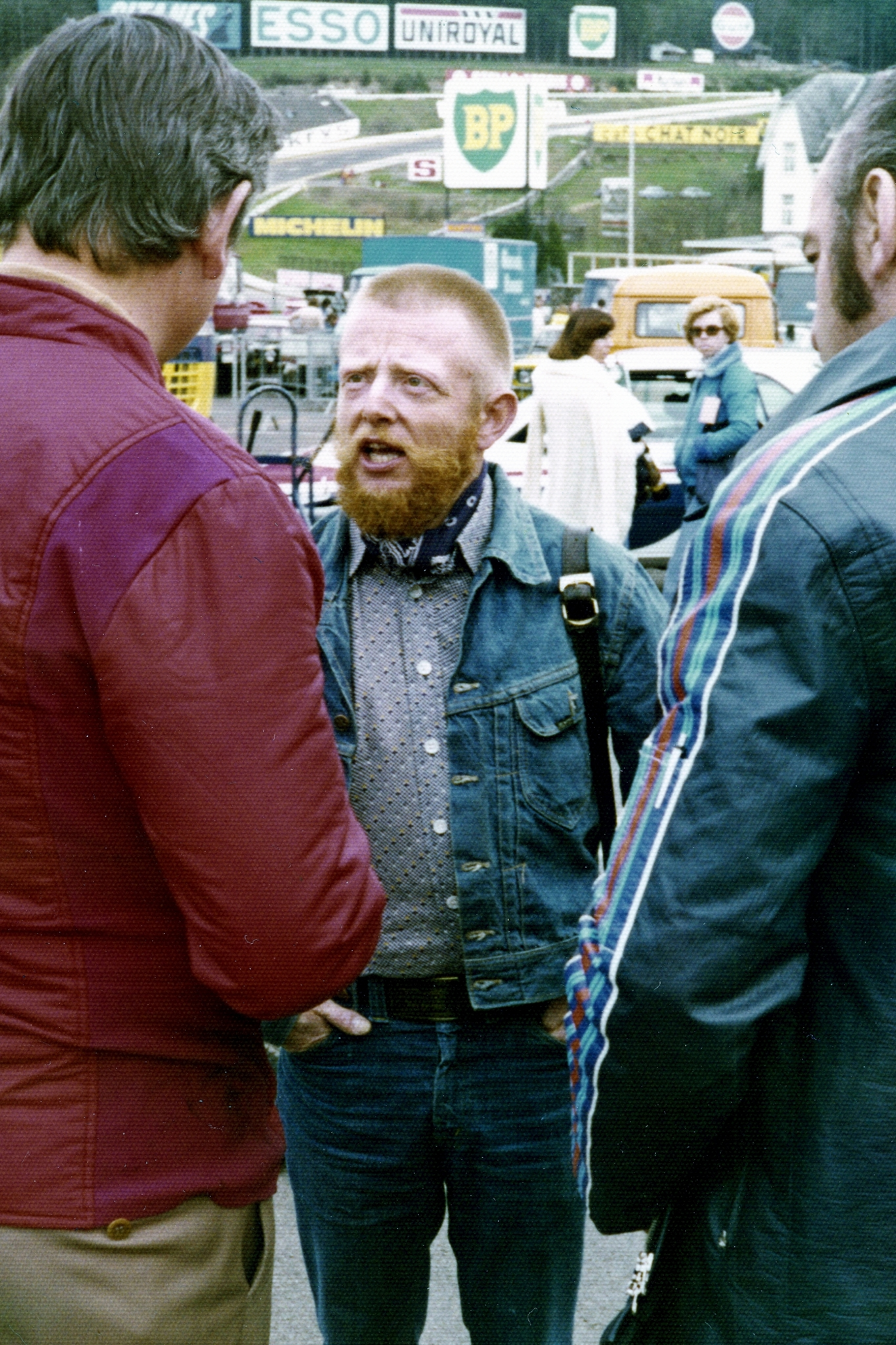
- Müller, in 1975 at Spa-Francorchamps
- Born: 11 May 1940; Reinach, Switzerland
- Died: 24 May 1981 (aged 41); Cologne, West Germany

Formula One World Championship career
- Nationality: (Switzerland) Swiss
- Active years: 1971
- Team: non-works Lotus
- Entries: 1 (0 starts)
- Championships: 0
- Wins: 0
- Podiums: 0
- Career points: 0
- Pole positions: 0
- Fastest laps: 0
- First entry: 1971 Italian Grand Prix
- Last entry: 1971 Italian Grand Prix

Herbert Müller Rebmann (11 May 1940 – 24 May 1981) was a racing driver from Switzerland. He was born in Reinach and was nicknamed Stumpen-Herbie. Among other successes, he won the Targa Florio twice, in 1966 and 1973, both with Porsche.

Driving a Ferrari 512 in an Interserie race at the Nürburgring, Müller survived a fiery start collision that ended in the pit lane next to a fire engine. Müller got out of the car and ran towards a fire fighter who put out the flames on his overall.

Müller died in the 1981 1000 km Nürburgring in his Porsche 908 Turbo, racing with his longtime friend Siegfried Brunn. Before the event, Müller stated that he would retire from driving after the end of the race. On lap 1, Bobby Rahal, driving the Bob Akin Porsche 935, raced side-by-side with Guy Edwards in a Lola T600-Cosworth. The two cars collided and Rahal's Porsche made contact with Henri Pescarolo, driving a Lancia Beta Montecarlo. It sent Rahal's Porsche spinning backwards on the left side of the track at Kesselchen. The car, which was fully fueled from the first lap, was allowed to remain where it was abandoned. Akin reported in a November 1981 Road & Track article that a marshal called four times to race control the car was in a dangerous section of the circuit and had to be removed, with the request repeatedly ignored. On lap 17, Brunn pitted and exited the car, with Müller taking over driving duties. On the same lap, another driver spun in front of him at Kesselchen, which is after Bergwerk. He collided heavily with an earth bank and then collided with the abandoned Akin Porsche 935, causing a large explosion and fire. He was dead by the time he was removed from the burning car; he had not been wearing his safety belts at the time of the crash, and was killed in the initial impact. The race was stopped after 17 laps and the result declared official after 17 of 44 laps. Half points were awarded as the race had not reached 33 laps.

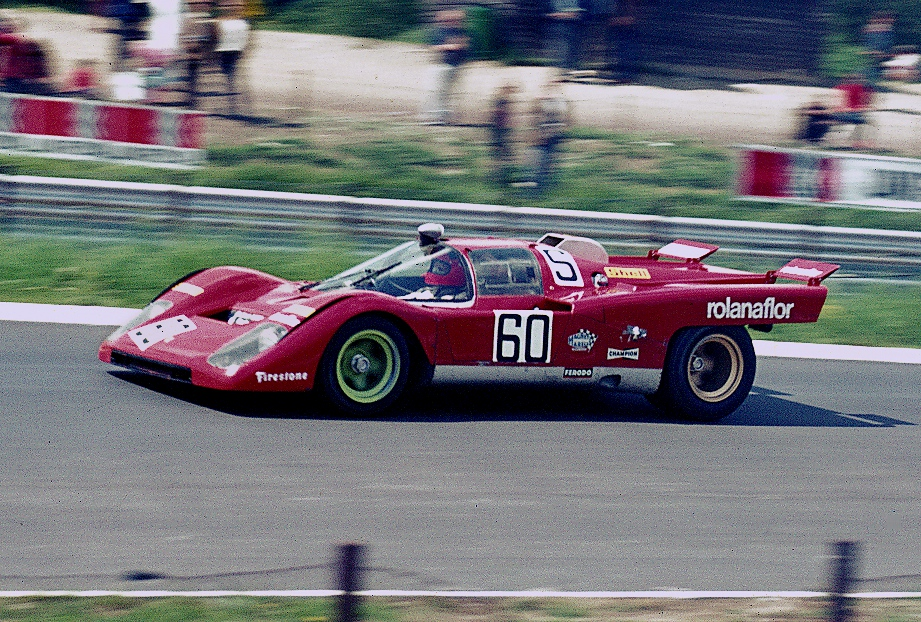
Herbert Müller in 1971 driving a Ferrari 512M at the Nürburgring

== Racing record ==
=== Complete Formula One World Championship results ===
(key) (Races in bold indicate pole position, races in italics indicate fastest lap)

Year	Entrant	Chassis	Engine	1	2	3	4	5	6	7	8	9	10	11	WDC	Pts.
1971	Villiger Cigar Team Herbert Müller	Lotus 72A	Ford Cosworth DFV 3.0 V8	RSA	ESP	MON	NED	FRA	GBR	GER	AUT	ITA; DNA	CAN	USA	NC	0

=== Non-championship Formula One results ===
(key) (Races in bold indicate pole position, races in italics indicate fastest lap)

Year	Entrant	Chassis	Engine	1	2	3	4	5	6	7	8	9	10	11	12	13	14
1963	Scuderia Filipinetti	Lotus 21	Climax FPF 1.5 L4	LOM	GLV	PAU; 5	IMO	SYR	AIN	INT	ROM	SOL	KAN	MED	AUT	OUL	RAN

=== 24 Hours of Le Mans results ===
Year	Team	Co-drivers	Car	Class	Laps	Pos.	Class pos.
1964	(Switzerland) Scuderia Filipinetti	(Switzerland) Claude Sage	Porsche 904/4 GTS	GT 2.0	309	11th	4th
1965	(Switzerland) Scuderia Filipinetti	(United States) Ronnie Bucknum	Ford GT40	P +5.0	29	DNF	DNF
1966	(Switzerland) Scuderia Filipinetti	(Belgium) Willy Mairesse	Ferrari 365 P2	P 5.0	166	DNF	DNF
1967	(Switzerland) Scuderia Filipinetti	(France) Jean Guichet	Ferrari 412 P	P 5.0	88	DNF	DNF
1968	(Switzerland) Scuderia Filipinetti	(United Kingdom) Jonathan Williams	Ferrari 250LM	S 5.0	212	DNF	DNF
1969	(France) Ecurie Matra - Elf	(France) Johnny Servoz-Gavin	Matra-Simca MS630	P 3.0	158	DNF	DNF
1970	(Switzerland) Scuderia Filipinetti	(United Kingdom) Mike Parkes	Ferrari 512S	S 5.0	37	DNF	DNF
1971	(United Kingdom) JW Automotive Engineering	(United Kingdom) Richard Attwood	Porsche 917K	S 5.0	395	**2nd**	**2nd**
1972	(Spain) Escuderia Montjuïch	(Switzerland) Cox Kocher	De Tomaso Pantera	GTS +5.0	31	DNF	DNF
1973	(Germany) Martini Racing Team	(Netherlands) Gijs van Lennep	Porsche 911 Carrera RSR	S 3.0	328	4th	4th
1974	(Germany) Martini Racing Porsche System	(Netherlands) Gijs van Lennep	Porsche 911 Carrera RSR Turbo	S 3.0	332	**2nd**	**2nd**
1978	(Switzerland) Mecarillos-Cégécol Racing Team	(Switzerland) Claude Haldi (Switzerland) Nick McGranger	Porsche 935	Gr. 5 SP	140	DNF	DNF
1979	(Switzerland) Lubrifilm Racing Team	(Switzerland) Angelo Pallavicini (Switzerland) Marco Vanoli	Porsche 934	Gr. 4 GT	296	4th	**1st**
