= Equipe Matra Sports =

Racing team owned by Matra

(France) Equipe Matra Sports
- Base: Vélizy-Villacoublay, Paris, France
- Team principal(s): Jean-Luc Lagardère
- Founder(s): Jean-Luc Lagardère; Marcel Chassagny
- Noted staff: Gérard Ducarouge; Ken Tyrrell; Bernard Boyer
- Noted drivers: (France) Johnny Servoz-Gavin (France) Henri Pescarolo (United Kingdom) Jackie Stewart (France) Jean-Pierre Beltoise (New Zealand) Chris Amon

Formula One World Championship career
- First entry: 1967 Monaco Grand Prix
- Races entered: 61
- Engines: Ford, Matra
- Constructors' Championships: 1 (1969)
- Drivers' Championships: 1 (1969)
- Race victories: 9
- Podiums: 21
- Points: 163
- Pole positions: 4
- Fastest laps: 12
- Final entry: 1972 United States Grand Prix

Matra as a Formula One engine manufacturer
Formula One World Championship career
- First entry: 1968 Monaco Grand Prix
- Last entry: 1982 Caesars Palace Grand Prix
- Races entered: 126 (125 starts)
- Chassis: Matra, Shadow, Ligier
- Constructors' Championships: 0
- Drivers' Championships: 0
- Race victories: 3
- Podiums: 24
- Points: 173
- Pole positions: 4
- Fastest laps: 5

The Matra Company's racing team, under the names of Matra Sports, Equipe Matra Elf and Equipe Matra Sports (after a takeover by Simca in 1969 as Matra-Simca Division Automobile), was formed in 1965 and based at Champagne-sur-Seine (1965–1967), Romorantin-Lanthenay (1967–1969) and Vélizy-Villacoublay (1969–1979). In 1979 the team was taken over by Peugeot and renamed as Automobiles Talbot.

== Motorsports history ==
In the mid-1960s, Matra enjoyed considerable success in Formula 3 and Formula 2 racing, particularly with the MS5 monocoque-based car, winning the French and European championships. In 1967, Jacky Ickx surprised the F1 establishment by posting the third-fastest qualifying time of 8:14 at the German Grand Prix at Nürburgring in his 1600cc Matra MS7 Formula 2 car, which was allowed to enter alongside the 3000cc Formula One cars. In the race, he failed to finish due to a broken suspension.

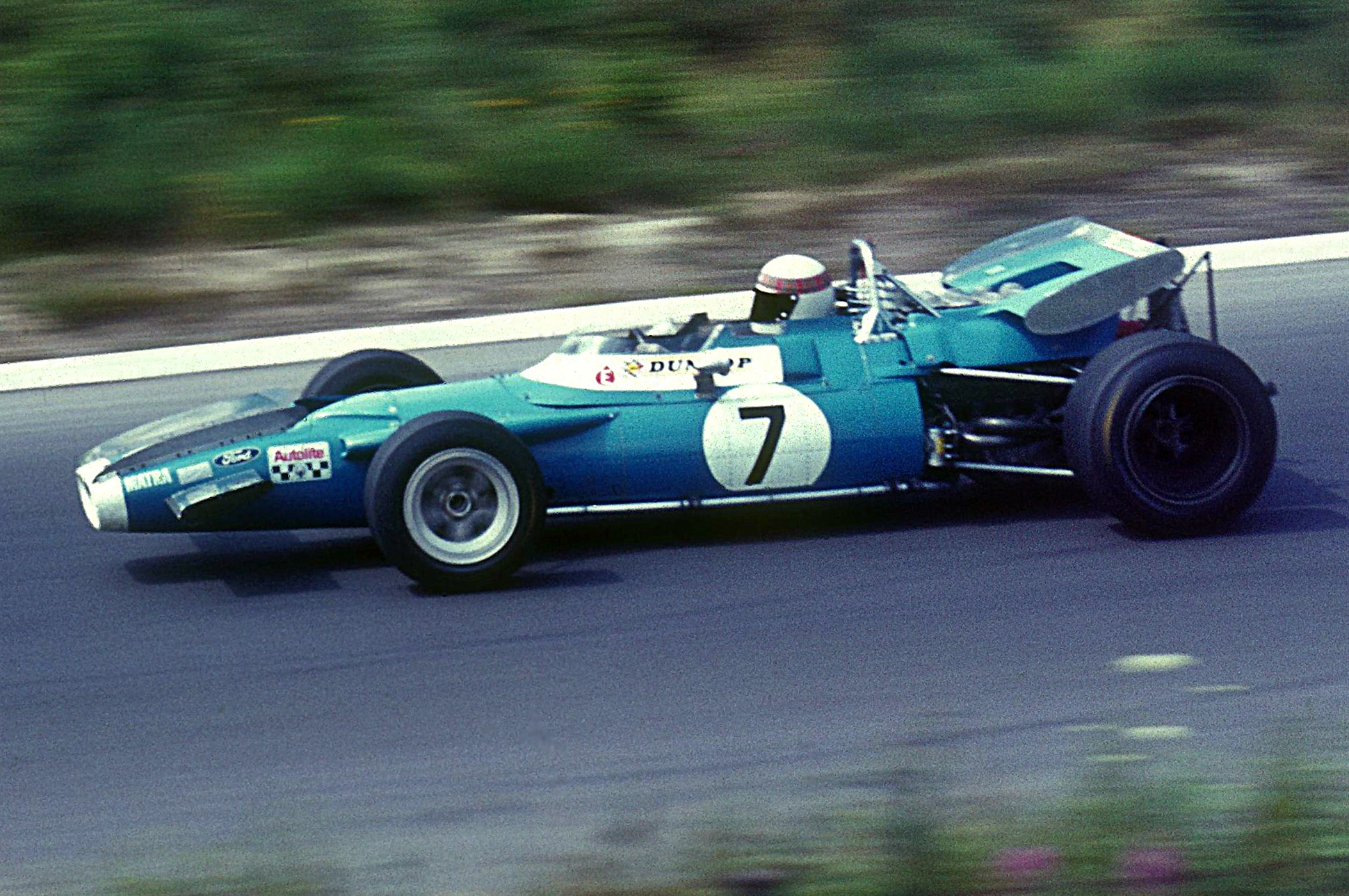
Jackie Stewart in 1969 with the Matra MS80-Ford at the Nürburgring. The car wears the Bleu de France, the national racing colour of France.

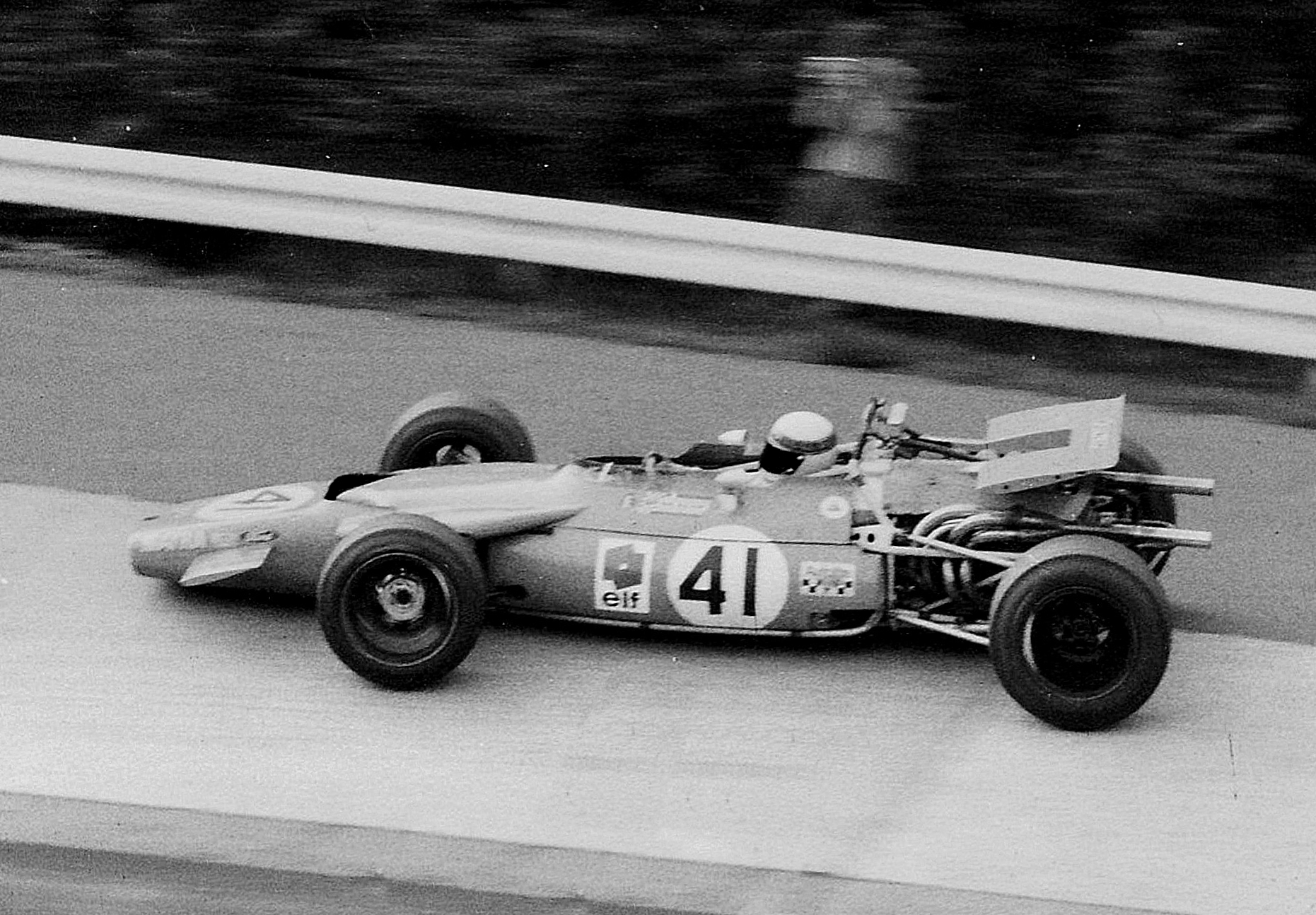
Jackie Stewart pictured with the Matra MS84 at the Nürburgring

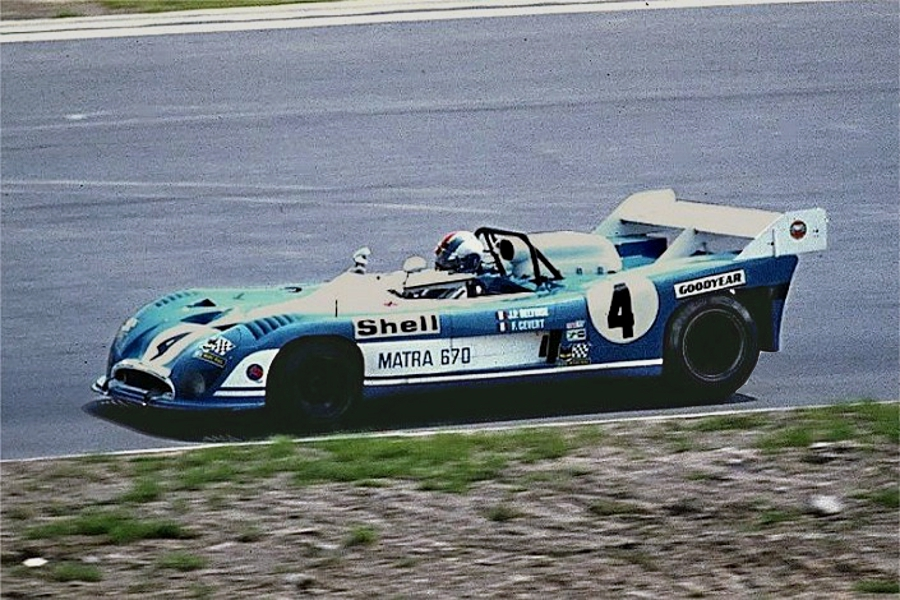
François Cevert driving the Matra MS670 Group 5 Sports Car in the 1973 1000 km Nürburgring race.

Matra entered Formula One in 1968 and achieved the first win for a French constructor in Formula One race at the 1968 Dutch Grand Prix. Jackie Stewart was a serious contender, winning three Grands Prix in the Matra MS10 car run by Ken Tyrrell's privateer team Matra International which competed alongside the works team.

The F1 team was established at Vélizy-Villacoublay in the southwestern suburbs of Paris, France. The car's most innovative feature was the use of aviation-inspired structural fuel tanks. These allowed the chassis to be around 15 kg (33 lb) lighter, while still being stronger than its competitors. The FIA considered the technology to be unsafe and decided to ban it for 1970.

Matra CEO Jean-Luc Lagardère made a strategic decision for the 1969 championship: the Matra works team would not compete in Formula One. Matra would instead focus its efforts on Ken Tyrrell's privateer team (renamed Matra International) and build a new Ford Cosworth DFV-powered car with structural fuel tanks, even though it would only be eligible for a single season. The decision was even more radical given that Matra was seeking a partnership with Simca, which would preclude using Ford-branded engines for the following year. Stewart won the 1969 title easily with the new Cosworth-powered Matra MS80 car, which was designed by Gérard Ducarouge and Bernard Boyer, and corrected most of the weaknesses of the MS10 car.

The 1969 World Drivers' and Constructors' Championship titles were the first titles won by a French constructor, and still remain the only titles won by a car built in France as well as a car entered by a privateer team. It was a spectacular achievement from a constructor that had only entered Formula One the previous year. France became only the third country (after the United Kingdom and Italy) to have produced a winning constructor, and Matra became the only constructor to have won the Constructors' Championship without running its own works team.

Like Cosworth, Lotus and McLaren, Matra experimented with four-wheel drive during the 1969 season. Johnny Servoz-Gavin became the one and only driver to score a point with a 4WD car, finishing sixth with the Matra MS84 at the 1969 Canadian Grand Prix. The MS84, along with Brabham's BT26A, was one of the last spaceframe cars to compete in Formula One.

For 1970, following the agreement with Simca, Matra asked Tyrrell to use their Matra Sports V12 engine rather than the Cosworth. Stewart got to test Matra's V12, but since a large part of the Tyrrell budget was provided by Ford, and another significant sponsor was French state-owned petroleum company Elf, which had an agreement with Renault that precluded supporting a Simca partner, the partnership between Matra and Tyrrell ended.

Matra V12s powered the Shadow DN7 car in two races of the 1975 season and then cars built and entered by the Ligier Formula 1 team in 1976–1978, and again (under the name Talbot Ligier) in 1981–1982, winning three races (the 1977 Swedish Grand Prix, 1981 Austrian Grand Prix and 1981 Canadian Grand Prix). Jacques Laffite's victory at the 1977 Swedish Grand Prix was the first Formula One victory for a French-licensed team and a French engine, as well as the first all-French victory in the Formula One World Championship.

The company was also successful in endurance racing with cars powered by their V12 engine. The sportscar racing team was based at first at Vélizy-Villacoublay and then moved to Le Castellet, near Marseille, France.

The Matra MS670 sports prototype won the 24 Hours of Le Mans in 1972, 1973, and 1974. It also delivered the World Championship for Makes to Matra in both 1973 and 1974 seasons.

== Racing models ==
- Matra MS1
- Matra MS2
- Matra MS5
- Matra MS6
- Matra MS7
- Matra MS9
- Matra MS10
- Matra MS11
- Matra MS80
- Matra MS84
- Matra MS120
- Matra MS120B
- Matra MS120C
- Matra MS120D
- Matra MS610
- Matra MS620
- Matra MS630
- Matra-Simca MS630
- Matra-Simca MS630/650
- Matra MS640
- Matra-Simca MS650
- Matra-Simca MS660
- Matra-Simca MS660C
- Matra-Simca MS670
- Matra-Simca MS670B
- Matra-Simca MS670C
- Matra-Simca MS680

== Successes ==
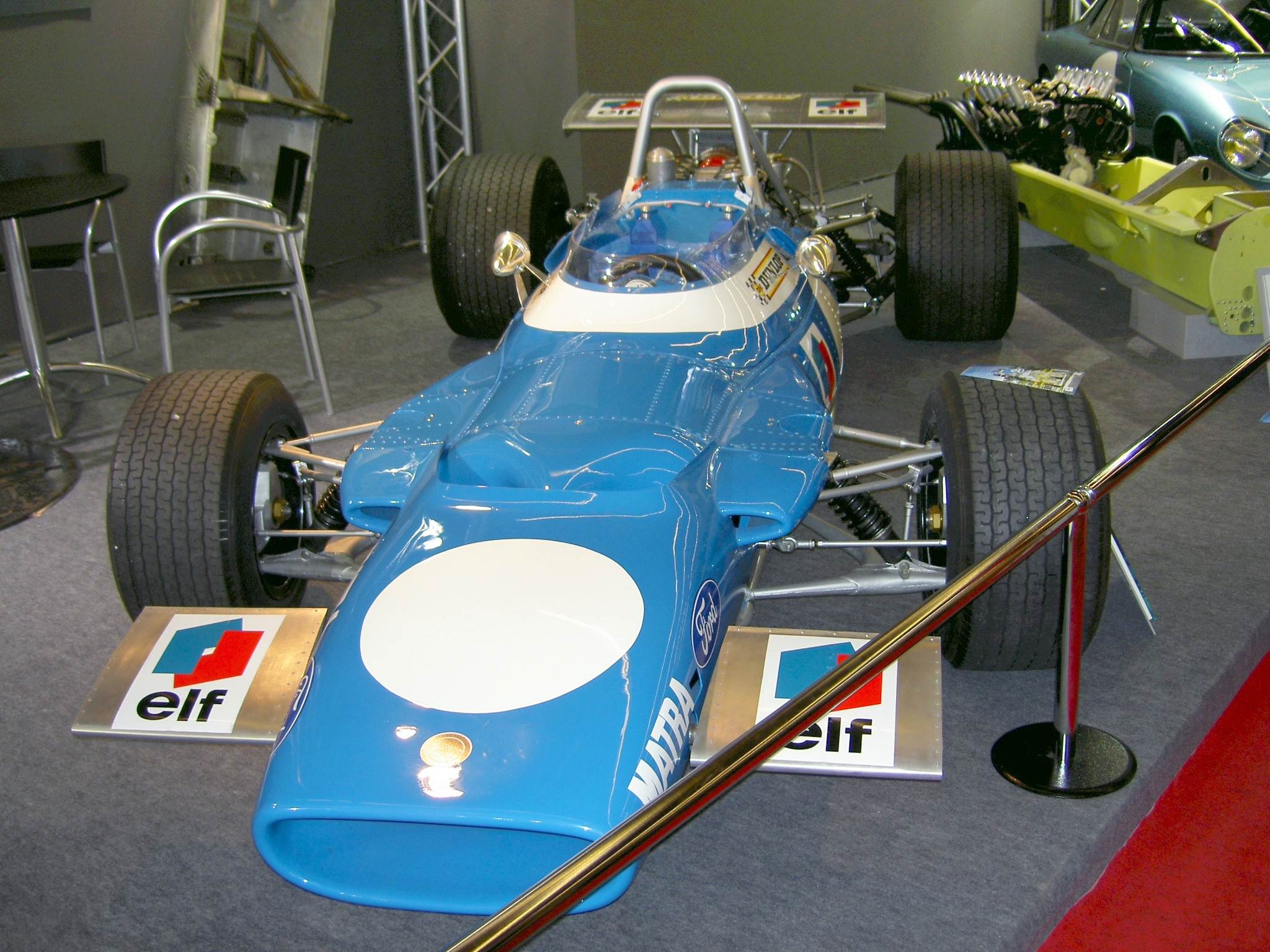
The F1 Matra MS80 victorious in 1969

- 334 races, all categories, spanning 10 years
- 124 victories, 104 lap records
- 1 Formula One World Drivers' Championship (1969, Jackie Stewart, MS80)
- 1 Formula One World Constructors' Championship (1969, Matra-Elf International)
- 5 French Formula Two Championships (1966–1970)
- 3 European Formula Two Championships (1967–1969)
- 3 French Formula Three Championships (1965–1967)
- 2 World Championship for Makes (1973–1974)
- 3 victories at 24 Hours of Le Mans (1972–1974)
- 2 victories at Tour de France Automobile (1970–1971)

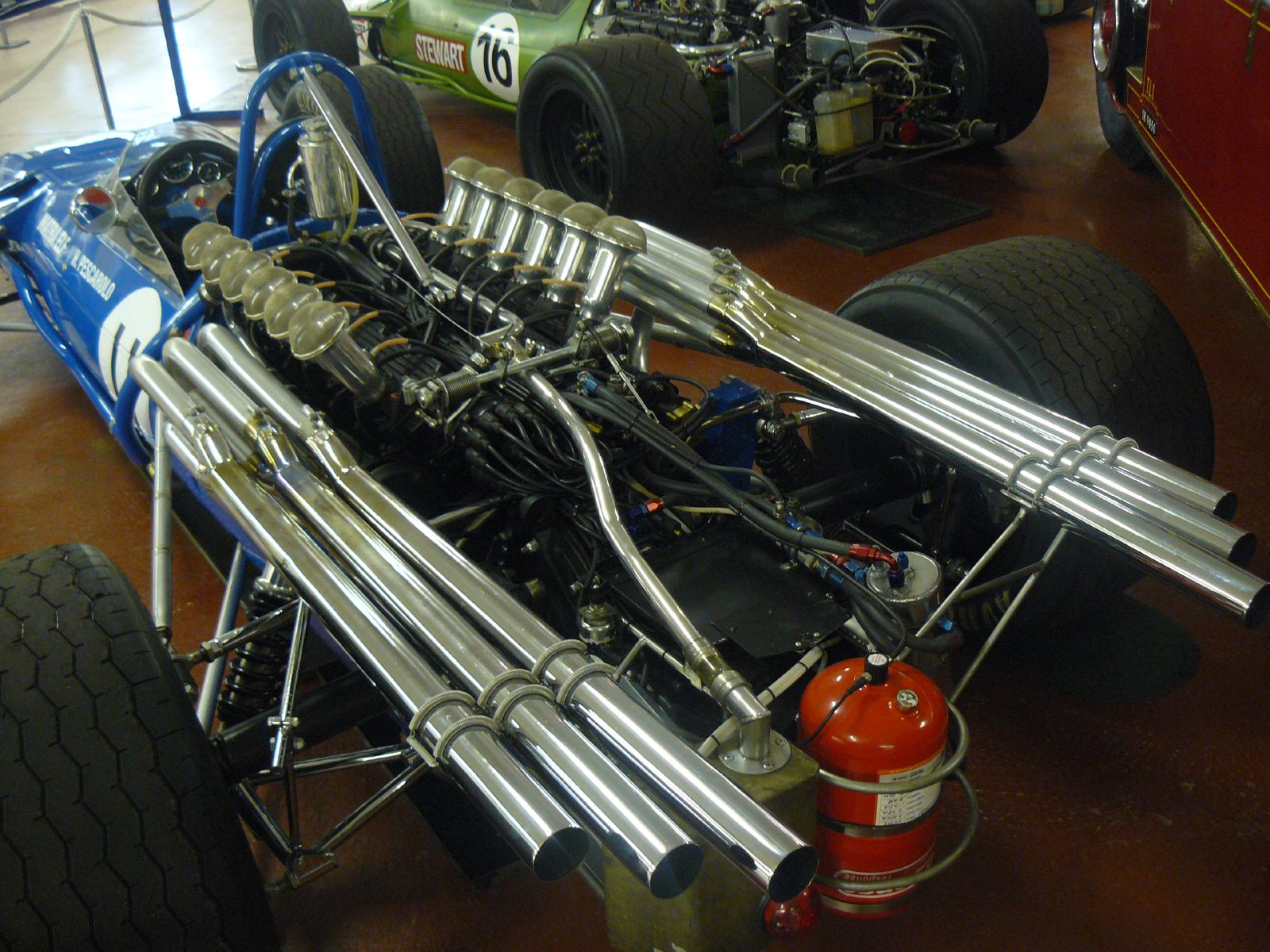
V12 engine in a Matra MS11 F1, 1968

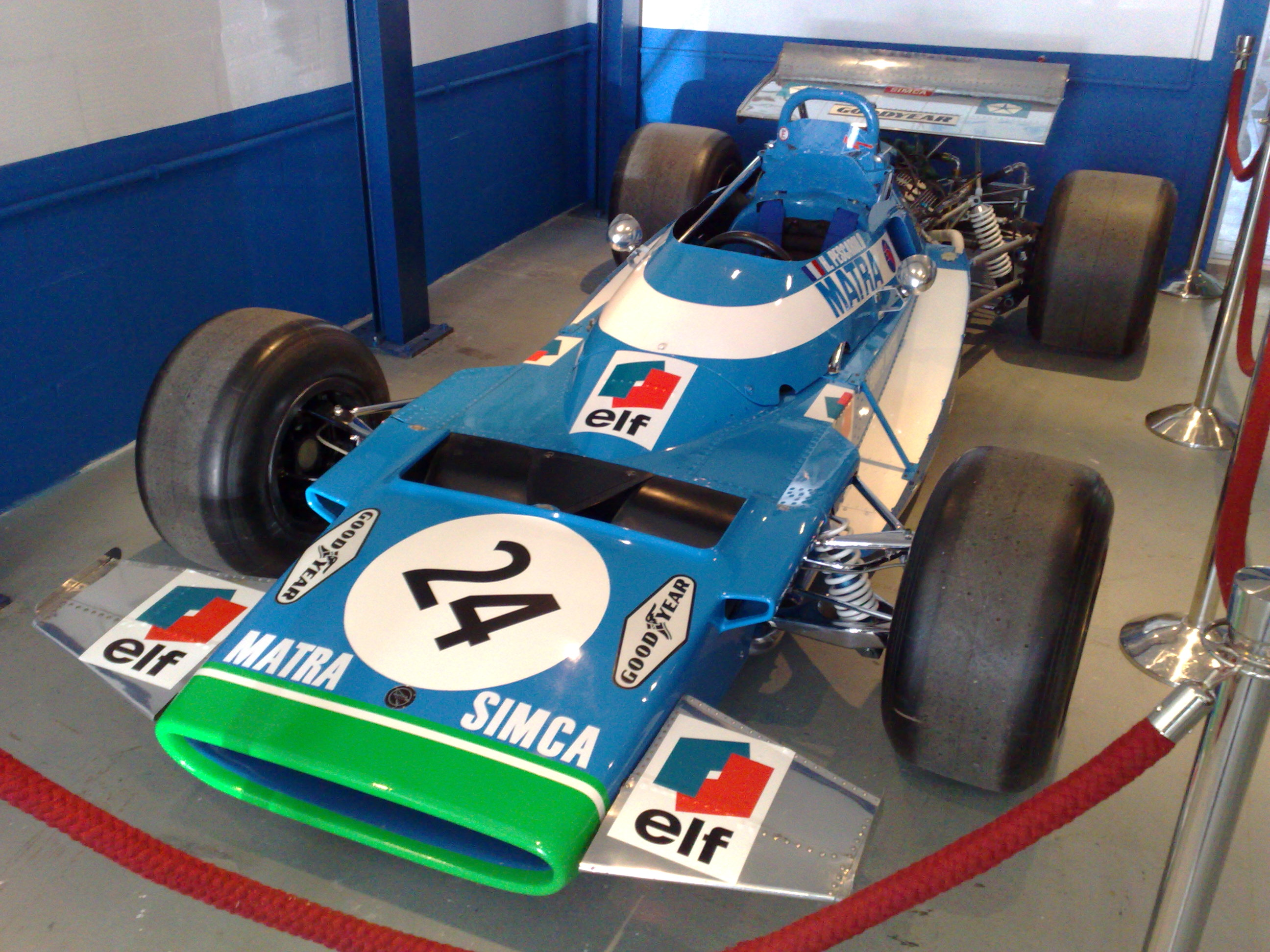
Chris Amon's Matra MS120B used in the 1971 Argentine Grand Prix

== Complete Formula One World Championship results ==
=== As a constructor ===
(key)

Year	Entrants	Chassis	Engine	Tyres	Drivers	1	2	3	4	5	6	7	8	9	10	11	12	13	Points	WCC
1966						MON	BEL	FRA	GBR	NED	GER	CAN	ITA	USA	MEX				0	—N/a
1966	(France) Matra Sports	MS5	Ford Straight-4	D	(France) Jean-Pierre Beltoise						8								0	—N/a
1966	(France) Matra Sports	MS5	Ford Straight-4	D	(France) Jo Schlesser						10								0	—N/a
1966	(United Kingdom) Tyrrell Racing Organisation	MS5	Ford Straight-4	D	(Belgium) Jacky Ickx						Ret								0	—N/a
1966	(United Kingdom) Tyrrell Racing Organisation	MS5	BRM Straight-4	D	(West Germany) Hubert Hahne						9								0	—N/a
1967						RSA	MON	NED	BEL	FRA	GBR	GER	CAN	ITA	USA	MEX			0	—N/a
1967	(France) Matra Sports	MS5; MS7	Ford Straight-4	D G	(France) Johnny Servoz-Gavin		Ret												0	—N/a
1967	(France) Matra Sports	MS5; MS7	Ford Straight-4	D G	(France) Jean-Pierre Beltoise		DNQ								7	7			0	—N/a
1967	Ecurie Ford-France	MS5	Ford Straight-4	D	(France) Jo Schlesser							Ret							0	—N/a
1967	(United Kingdom) Tyrrell Racing Organisation	MS5	Ford Straight-4	D	(Belgium) Jacky Ickx							Ret							0	—N/a
1968						RSA	ESP	MON	BEL	NED	FRA	GBR	GER	ITA	CAN	USA	MEX		8	9th (Note: In the 1968 Constructors' Championship, Matra-Ford finished 3rd (45 points), Matra(-Matra) finished 9th (8 points))
1968	(France) Matra Sports	MS11	Matra V12	D	(France) Henri Pescarolo										Ret	DNS	9		8	9th
1968	(France) Matra Sports	MS11	Matra V12	D	(France) Jean-Pierre Beltoise			Ret	8	2^{F}	9	Ret	Ret	5	Ret	Ret	Ret		8	9th
1968	(France) Matra Sports	MS7	Ford Straight-4	D	(France) Jean-Pierre Beltoise	6													45	3rd
1968	(United Kingdom) Matra International	MS9; MS10	Ford Cosworth DFV	D	(France) Jean-Pierre Beltoise		5^{F}												45	3rd
1968	(United Kingdom) Matra International	MS9; MS10	Ford Cosworth DFV	D	(United Kingdom) Jackie Stewart	Ret			4	1	3	6	1^{F}	Ret	6	1^{F}	7		45	3rd
1968	(United Kingdom) Matra International	MS9; MS10	Ford Cosworth DFV	D	(France) Johnny Servoz-Gavin			Ret						2	Ret		Ret		45	3rd
1969						RSA	ESP	MON	NED	FRA	GBR	GER	ITA	CAN	USA	MEX			66	1st
1969	(United Kingdom) Matra International	MS10; MS80; MS84	Ford Cosworth DFV	D	(United Kingdom) Jackie Stewart	1^{F}	1	Ret^{P}^{F}	1^{F}	1^{P}^{F}	1^{F}	2	1	Ret	Ret	4			66	1st
1969	(United Kingdom) Matra International	MS10; MS80; MS84	Ford Cosworth DFV	D	(France) Jean-Pierre Beltoise	6	3	Ret	8	2	9	12	3^{F}	4	Ret	5			66	1st
1969	(United Kingdom) Matra International	MS10; MS80; MS84	Ford Cosworth DFV	D	(France) Johnny Servoz-Gavin									6	NC	8			66	1st
1969	(United Kingdom) Matra International	MS7	Ford Straight-4	D	(France) Johnny Servoz-Gavin							Ret							66	1st
1969	(France) Matra Sports	MS7	Ford Straight-4	D	(France) Henri Pescarolo							5							66	1st
1970						RSA	ESP	MON	BEL	NED	FRA	GBR	GER	AUT	ITA	CAN	USA	MEX	23	6th
1970	(France) Equipe Matra Elf	MS120	Matra V12	G	(France) Jean-Pierre Beltoise	4	Ret	Ret	3	5	13	Ret	Ret	6	3	8	Ret	5	23	6th
1970	(France) Equipe Matra Elf	MS120	Matra V12	G	(France) Henri Pescarolo	7	Ret	3	6	8	5	Ret	6	14	Ret	7	8	9	23	6th
1971						RSA	ESP	MON	NED	FRA	GBR	GER	AUT	ITA	CAN	USA			9	7th
1971	(France) Equipe Matra Sports	MS120B	Matra V12	G	(France) Jean-Pierre Beltoise		6	Ret	9	7	7				Ret	8			9	7th
1971	(France) Equipe Matra Sports	MS120B	Matra V12	G	(New Zealand) Chris Amon	5	3	Ret	Ret	5	Ret	Ret		6^{P}	10	12			9	7th
1972						ARG	RSA	ESP	MON	BEL	FRA	GBR	GER	AUT	ITA	CAN	USA		12	8th
1972	(France) Equipe Matra Sports	MS120C; MS120D	Matra V12	G	(New Zealand) Chris Amon	Ret	15	Ret	6	6^{F}	3^{P}^{F}	4	15	5	Ret	6	15		12	8th

=== As an engine supplier ===
(key)

Year	Entrants	Chassis	Engine	Tyres	Drivers	1	2	3	4	5	6	7	8	9	10	11	12	13	14	15	16	17	Points	WCC
1975						ARG	BRA	RSA	ESP	MON	BEL	SWE	NED	FRA	GBR	GER	AUT	ITA	USA				0	—N/a
1975	(United States) UOP Shadow	Shadow DN7	Matra V12	G	(France) Jean-Pierre Jarier												Ret	Ret					0	—N/a
1976						BRA	RSA	USW	ESP	BEL	MON	SWE	FRA	GBR	GER	AUT	NED	ITA	CAN	USA	JPN		20	6th
1976	(France) Ligier Gitanes	Ligier JS5	Matra V12	G	(France) Jacques Laffite	Ret	Ret	4	12	3	12	4	14	DSQ	Ret	2	Ret	3^{P}	Ret	Ret	7^{F}		20	6th
1977						ARG	BRA	RSA	USW	ESP	MON	BEL	SWE	FRA	GBR	GER	AUT	NED	ITA	USA	CAN	JPN	18	8th
1977	(France) Ligier Gitanes	Ligier JS7	Matra V12	G	(France) Jacques Laffite	NC	Ret	Ret	9	7^{F}	7	Ret	1	8	6	Ret	Ret	2	8	7	Ret	5	18	8th
1977	(France) Ligier Gitanes	Ligier JS7	Matra V12	G	(France) Jean-Pierre Jarier																	Ret	18	8th
1978						ARG	BRA	RSA	USW	MON	BEL	ESP	SWE	FRA	GBR	GER	AUT	NED	ITA	USA	CAN		19	6th
1978	(France) Ligier Gitanes	Ligier JS7; JS7/9; JS9	Matra V12	G	(France) Jacques Laffite	16	9	5	5	Ret	5	3	7	7	10	3	5	8	4	11	Ret		19	6th
1981						USW	BRA	ARG	SMR	BEL	MON	ESP	FRA	GBR	GER	AUT	NED	ITA	CAN	CPL			44	4th
1981	(France) Equipe Talbot Gitanes	Ligier JS17	Matra V12	M	(France) Jean-Pierre Jarier	Ret	7																44	4th
1981	(France) Equipe Talbot Gitanes	Ligier JS17	Matra V12	M	(France) Jean-Pierre Jabouille			DNQ	NC	Ret	DNQ	Ret											44	4th
1981	(France) Equipe Talbot Gitanes	Ligier JS17	Matra V12	M	(France) Patrick Tambay								Ret	Ret	Ret	Ret	Ret	Ret	Ret	Ret			44	4th
1981	(France) Equipe Talbot Gitanes	Ligier JS17	Matra V12	M	(France) Jacques Laffite	Ret	6	Ret	Ret	2	3	2^{P}	Ret	3	3	1^{F}	Ret	Ret	1	6			44	4th
1982						RSA	BRA	USW	SMR	BEL	MON	DET	CAN	NED	GBR	FRA	GER	AUT	SUI	ITA	CPL		20	8th
1982	(France) Equipe Talbot Gitanes	Ligier JS17; JS17B; JS19	Matra V12	M	(United States) Eddie Cheever	Ret	Ret	Ret	WD	3	Ret	2	10	DNQ	Ret	16	Ret	Ret	Ret	6	3		20	8th
1982	(France) Equipe Talbot Gitanes	Ligier JS17; JS17B; JS19	Matra V12	M	(France) Jacques Laffite	Ret	Ret	Ret	WD	9	Ret	6	Ret	Ret	Ret	14	Ret	3	Ret	Ret	Ret		20	8th

1974 Matra-Simca MS670B (V12)

== Bibliography ==
- Robert Weber (June 2016). Automobilsport Racing / History / Passion #08: Matra V12 sports cars. Sportfahrer Verlag. ISSN 2199-126X.

Sporting positions
Preceded by Lotus	Formula One Constructors' Champion; 1969	Succeeded by Lotus
