= 1970 Watkins Glen 6 Hours =

Track map of Watkins Glen International (1956-1970)

The 1970 Watkins Glen 6 Hours was an endurance race held at the Watkins Glen Grand Prix Race Course, New York, United States on July 11, 1970. It was the ninth round of the 1970 World Sportscar Championship season.

== Pre-race ==
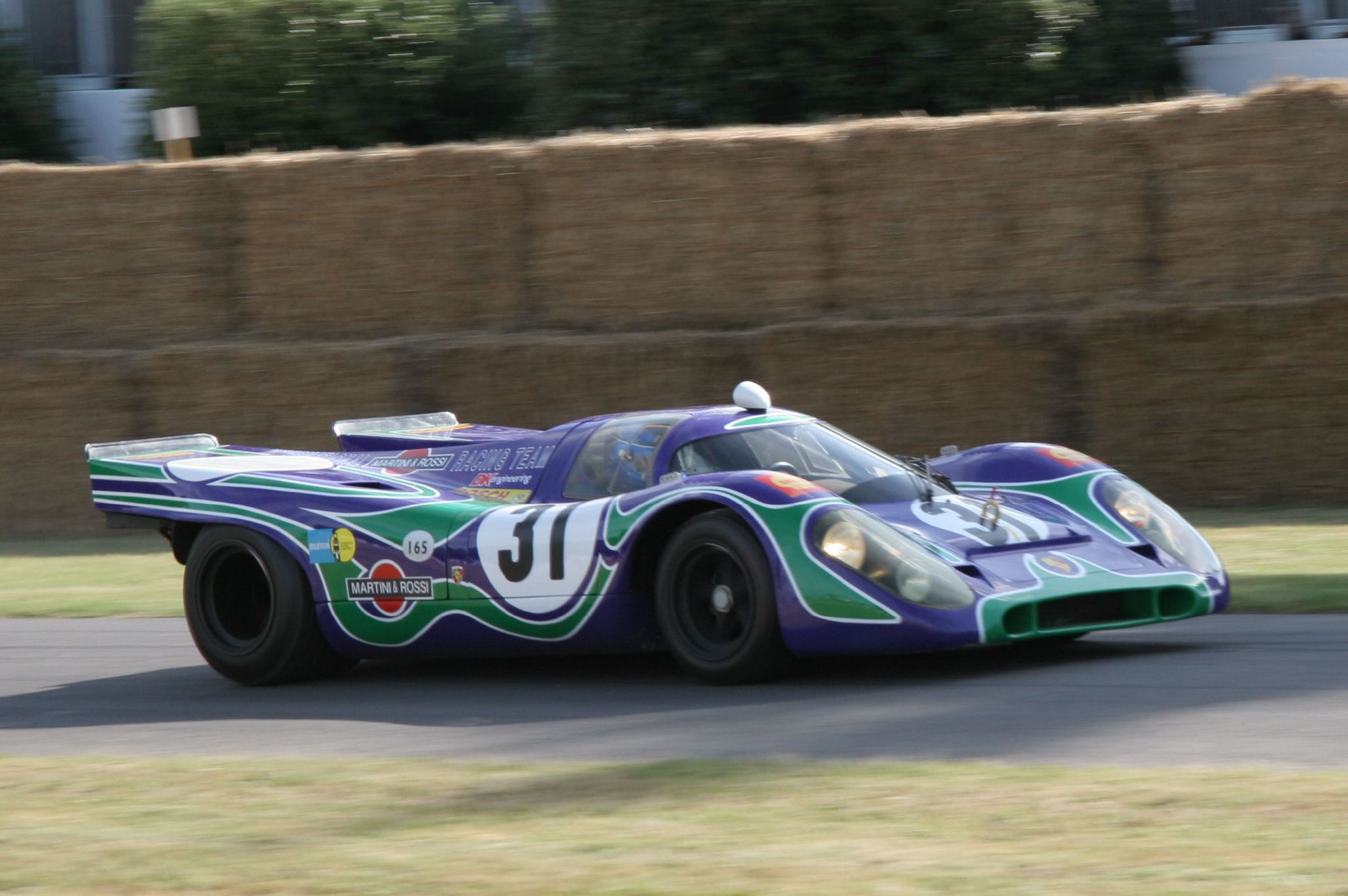
Martini Racing blue and green "psychedelic" livery on a 1970 917K, as raced at Watkins Glen in 1970 with #35 (#31 was on a blue&white 917K)

John Wyer's team had not won a race since Spa, and they came off an unsuccessful attempt at winning Le Mans; losing all three of their cars in 10 hours and the race to their sister teams, with Porsche Salzburg and Martini Racing on the podium. Mario Andretti returned to Ferrari to try to help the great marque repeat their triumph at Sebring less than 4 months previously. Ferrari were keen on doing this; a win here would be sufficient comeuppance for them after their Le Mans run. All four works cars had retired after 4 hours and 4 of 6 other privately entered 512's also retired.

This particular race was one of four time-limited races on the 1970 calendar; the others being at Daytona, Sebring, and Le Mans. It was the only 6 hour race on the calendar in 1970, with the winner covering 1140km. There were five 1000km races, lasting over 4 to nearly 7 hours depending on track and weather, and the 1970 Targa Florio had 11 laps for 792 km in 6:35 hours.

Qualifying once again went to a Porsche; the Gulf-Wyer Jo Siffert/Brian Redman 917K managed to edge out the Andretti/Giunti Ferrari 512S and the Rodriguez/Kinnunen 917K by three tenths of a second.

A pair of blue and white-striped Porsche Salzburg 917K were entered as Porsche Audi Division, while Martini Racing showed another blue-green Hippie car design, this time on the #35 917K.

This would be the last Watkins Glen 6 Hours race on the original circuit. The circuit was rebuilt for the next year; they used the short track (as the extension had not yet been finished) and the whole track in 1972.

== Race ==
At the start, Andretti took the lead from Siffert, but the Swiss driver took the lead back from Andretti on the third lap. He then lost the lead to Rodriguez. Later on in the race, Rodriguez attempted to switch off the 917K's headlights; but instead he switched off the fuel pumps, and the engine started to fail. Rodriguez was about to come into the pits, but then he realized what he had done, switched the pumps on, and then stormed through the field, made fastest lap and he & Kinnunen went on to win for the 4th time in the season. Wyer's team finished 1-2, and both cars finished on the same lap, with the works Ferrari of Andretti/Giunti completing the podium.

== Official results ==
| Pos | Class | No | Team | Drivers | Chassis | Engine | Laps |
|---|---|---|---|---|---|---|---|
| 1 | S 5.0 | 2 | (United Kingdom) John Wyer Automotive Engineering | (Mexico) Pedro Rodríguez (Finland) Leo Kinnunen | Porsche 917K | Porsche 4.9L Flat-12 | 308 |
| 2 | S 5.0 | 1 | (United Kingdom) John Wyer Automotive Engineering | (Switzerland) Jo Siffert (United Kingdom) Brian Redman | Porsche 917K | Porsche 4.9L Flat-12 | 308 |
| 3 | S 5.0 | 92 | (Italy) SpA Ferrari SEFAC | (United States) Mario Andretti (Italy) Ignazio Giunti | Ferrari 512S Spyder | Ferrari 5.0L V12 | 305 |
| 4 | S 5.0 | 31 | (United States) Porsche-Audi USA | (United Kingdom) Vic Elford (New Zealand) Denny Hulme | Porsche 917K | Porsche 4.9L Flat-12 | 302 |
| 5 | S 5.0 | 91 | (Italy) SpA Ferrari SEFAC | (Belgium) Jacky Ickx (Switzerland) Peter Schetty | Ferrari 512S Spyder | Ferrari 5.0L V12 | 298 |
| 6 | S 5.0 | 32 | (United States) Porsche-Audi USA | (United Kingdom) Richard Attwood (Germany) Kurt Ahrens Jr. | Porsche 917K | Porsche 4.9L Flat-12 | 295 |
| 7 | P 3.0 | 36 | (Germany) Martini International Racing | (Austria) Helmut Marko (Austria) Rudi Lins | Porsche 908/02 | Porsche 3.0L Flat-8 | 288 |
| 8 | S 5.0 | 50 | (Sweden) Ecurie Bonnier | (Sweden) Jo Bonnier (Sweden) Reine Wisell | Lola T70 Mk.3B | Chevrolet 5.0L V8 | 264 |
| 9 | S 5.0 | 35 | (Germany) Martini International Racing | (Netherlands) Gijs van Lennep (France) Gérard Larrousse | Porsche 917K | Porsche 4.5L Flat-12 | 260 |
| 10 | GT +2.5 | 9 | (United States) Bob Grossman | (United States) Bob Grossman (United States) Don Yenko | Chevrolet Camaro 427 | Chevrolet 7.0L V8 | 243 |
| 11 | S 2.0 | 52 | (United States) Dr. Mervin Rosen | (United States) Merv Rosen (United States) Dick Jacobs | Porsche 906 | Porsche 1.9L Flat-6 | 241 |
| 12 | S 2.0 | 53 | (United States) Mike Rahal | (United States) Hugh Wise (United States) Werner Frank | Porsche 906 | Porsche 1.9L Flat-6 | 236 |
| 13 | GT; 2.5 | 77 | (United States) Bruce Jennings | (United States) Bob Tuillus (United States) Bruce Jennings | Porsche 911T | Porsche 2.2L Flat-6 | 233 |
| 14 | GT; 2.5 | 41 | (United States) Jim Bandy | (United States) Jim Bandy (United States) Bruce Cargill | Lotus Europa | Ford 1.6L I4 | 233 |
| 15 | S 2.0 | 39 | (Canada) Rainer Brezinka | (Canada) Rainer Brezinka (Canada) Horst Petermann (Canada) Rudy Bartling | Porsche 906 | Porsche 1.9L Flat-6 | 231 |
| 16 | GT; 2.0 | 84 | (United States) Ralph Meaney | (United States) Gary Wright (United States) Francis C. Grant | Porsche 911S | Porsche 2.0L Flat-6 | 223 |
| 17 | P 2.0 | 46 | (United States) Jim Baker | (United States) Wayne Christian (United States) Charles Reynolds (United States) Bobby Rinzler | Chevron B16 | Ford 1.8L I4 | 223 |
| 18 | GT; 2.5 | 70 | (France) Sylvain Garant | (Switzerland) André Wicky (France) Sylvain Garant | Porsche 911T | Porsche 2.2L Flat-6 | 217 |
| 19 | P 2.0 | 46 | (United States) Jim Baker | (United States) Paul Richards (United States) Jim Baker | Chevron B16 | Ford 1.8L I4 | 206 |
| 20 | GT; 2.5 | 94 | (United States) Ralph Meaney | (United States) Ralph Meaney (United States) Stephen Behr | Porsche 914/6 GT | Porsche 1.9L Flat-6 | 181 |

=== Did Not Finish ===
| Class | No | Team | Drivers | Chassis | Engine | Laps |
|---|---|---|---|---|---|---|
| GT +2.5 | 20 | (United States) John Greenwood | (United States) Allan Barker (United States) John Greenwood | Chevrolet Corvette | Chevrolet 7.0L V8 | 116 |
| GT; 2.5 | 37 | Sunoco Canada | (Canada) Jacques Duval (Canada) George Nicholas | Porsche 911T | Porsche 2.0L Flat-6 | 92 |
| GT +2.5 | 63 | (United States) Robert Luebbe | (United States) Robert Luebbe (United States) Michael Summers | Chevrolet Corvette | Chevrolet 7.0L V8 | 85 |
| S 5.0 | 33 | (Germany) Georg Loos | (Germany) Georg Loos (Germany) Franz Pesch | Ferrari 512S | Ferrari 5.0L V12 | 24 |
| GT +2.5 | 63 | (United States) William A. Schumacher | (United States) Bill Schumacher (United States) Robert R. Johnson | Chevrolet Corvette | Chevrolet 7.0L V8 | 8 |
| P 3.0 | 53 | (United Kingdom) A. G. Dean Ltd. | (United Kingdom) Tony Dean (United States) Peter Revson | Porsche 908/02 | Porsche 3.0L Flat-8 | 3 |

== Statistics ==
- Pole position: #1 John Wyer Automotive Engineering Porsche 917K (Jo Siffert/Brian Redman) - 1:06.3 (127.581 mph/205.322 km/h)
- Fastest lap: #2 John Wyer Automotive Engineering Porsche 917K (Pedro Rodriguez)- 1:04.9 (124.833 mph/200.898 km/h)
- Time taken for winning car to cover scheduled distance: 6 hours and 47.7 seconds
- Average Speed: 189.592 km/h (117.807 mph)
- Weather conditions: Sunny

World Sportscar Championship
| Previous race: 24 Hours of Le Mans | 1970 season | Next race: Austrian 1000km |
