= 1970 Austrian 1000 km =

Sportscar race

Layout of the Österreichring (1969-1976)

The 1970 Austrian 1000km was an endurance race held at the Österreichring, near Zeltweg, Austria on October 11, 1970. It was the tenth and final round of the 1970 World Sportscar Championship season.

John Wyer's factory supported Gulf-Porsche team won again, they had won 7 of 10 races in the season (in addition to this race, Daytona, Brands Hatch, Monza, Targa Florio, Spa, and Watkins Glen) and on top of that, the Porsche Salzburg prototypes won 2 more races (Nürburgring and Le Mans). Jo Siffert and Brian Redman won their third race together with their Porsche 917K; they faced intense opposition from 2 factory teams with revised and improved cars- Jacky Ickx and Peter Schetty in a Ferrari 512M and later in the race, an Alfa Romeo T33/3-71 driven by Andrea De Adamich and Henri Pescarolo. But Porsche also had made revisions to their machines- they brought to the scenic Österreichring new 5-liter engines for 3 of their 917K's. The engine in the Rodriguez/Kinnunen 917K blew up on the 5th lap while Rodriguez was driving; the Ickx/Schetty 512M's electrics failed on the 54th lap, and although the engine in the Siffert/Redman car was running on 11 cylinders and the De Adamich/Pescarolo Alfa Romeo was catching them at 15 seconds a lap, the engine in the Alfa expired; but they finished 2nd on distance already covered and won the 3 liter prototype class.

The 1970 WSC was utterly dominated by Porsche. They had won every race in the season except Sebring; and they would go on to dominate the next season as well. But new rules for 1972 banning engines in prototypes larger than 3 liters made the 917's and 512's (the 512's were only run by Ferrari for this year; they decided to build a 3 liter car, the 312PB for the new regulations) obsolete, and Porsche pulled out of endurance racing and did not return until 1976.

== Official results ==
The Österreichring (1969-1976)

Pos	Class	No	Team	Drivers	Chassis	Engine	Laps
1	S 5.0	23	(United Kingdom) John Wyer Automotive Engineering	(Switzerland) Jo Siffert (United Kingdom) Brian Redman	Porsche 917K	Porsche 5.0L Flat-12	170
2	P 3.0	3	(Italy) Autodelta SpA	(Italy) Andrea De Adamich (France) Henri Pescarolo	Alfa Romeo T33/3-71	Alfa Romeo 3.0L V8	168
3	P 3.0	6	(Germany) Martini International Racing	(France) Gérard Larrousse (Austria) Rudi Lins	Porsche 908/02	Porsche 3.0L Flat-8	167
4	S 5.0	21	(Austria) Porsche Salzburg	(United Kingdom) Vic Elford (United Kingdom) Richard Attwood	Porsche 917K	Porsche 5.0L Flat-12	162
5	P 3.0	5	(Germany) Martini International Racing	(Germany) Reinhold Jöst (Austria) Gerold Pankl	Porsche 908/02	Porsche 3.0L Flat-8	162
6	P 3.0	12	(Austria) Bosch Racing Team Wien	(Austria) Niki Lauda (Austria) Peter Peter	Porsche 908/02	Porsche 3.0L Flat-8	162
7	S 5.0	25	(Germany) Gelo Racing	(Germany) Georg Loos (Germany) Franz Pesch	Ferrari 512S	Ferrari 5.0L V12	156
8	P 2.0	7	(United Kingdom) Max Wilson	(United Kingdom) Max Wilson (United Kingdom) Mac Daghorn	Lola T210	Ford 1.6L I4	153
9	S 2.0	14	(Italy) Scuderia Brescia Corse	(Italy) Luigi Moreschi (Italy) "Pam"	Abarth 2000 OT	Abarth 1.6 I4	149
10	S 2.0	14	(Austria) Bosch Racing Team	(Austria) Lambert Hofer (Austria) Werner Riedl	Porsche 910	Porsche 1.9L Flat-6	146
11	S 5.0	24	(United Kingdom) Team Snake Speed	(United States) David Weir (United Kingdom) Alain de Cadenet	Ford GT40 Mk.I	Ford 4.9L V8	141
12	GT; 2.0	51	(Germany) Peter-Ernst Strähle / Schüler	(Germany) Günter Steckkönig (Germany) Stephen Behr	Porsche 914/6 GT	Porsche 1.9L Flat-6	139
13	S 2.0	32	(Austria) Bosch Racing Team	(Austria) Kurt Rieder (Austria) Otto Stuppacher (Austria) Siegfried Pust	Porsche 906	Porsche 1.9L Flat-6	139
14	GT; 2.0	49	(Switzerland) Squadra Tartaruga	(Switzerland) Ernst Seiler (Switzerland) Peter Ettmüller	Porsche 914/6 GT	Porsche 1.9L Flat-6	137
15	GT; 2.5	53	(Italy) Jolly Club	(Italy) Mario Ilotte (Italy) Mario Ruspa	Porsche 911	Porsche 2.2L Flat-6	137
16	GT; 2.5	43	(Germany) Peter-Ernst Strähle / Schüler	(Germany) Roland Bauer (Germany) Dieter Schmid	Porsche 911S	Porsche 2.2L Flat-6	136
17	P 2.0	9	(Switzerland) Charles Graemiger	(Switzerland) Charles Graemiger (Switzerland) Richard Vogel	Chevron B8	BMW 1.8L I4	135
18	GT; 2.5	41	(Switzerland) Wicky Racing Team	(France) Sylvain Garant (France) Jean-Marie Masoneri	Porsche 911S	Porsche 2.2L Flat-6	133
19	GT; 2.5	46	(Germany) Kremer Racing	(Germany) Erwin Kremer (Germany) Günther Huber	Porsche 911S	Porsche 2.2L Flat-6	124

=== Disqualified ===
Class	No	Team	Drivers	Chassis	Engine	Laps
P 3.0	3	(Italy) Autodelta SpA	(Netherlands) Toine Hezemans (United States) Masten Gregory	Alfa Romeo T33/3-71	Alfa Romeo 3.0L V8	

=== Did Not Finish ===
Class	No	Team	Drivers	Chassis	Engine	Laps
P 3.0	1	(Italy) Autodelta SpA	(Netherlands) Toine Hezemans (United States) Masten Gregory	Alfa Romeo T33/3-71	Alfa Romeo 3.0L V8	60
S 5.0	31	(Italy) SpA Ferrari SEFAC	(Belgium) Jacky Ickx (Switzerland) Peter Schetty	Ferrari 512M	Ferrari 5.0L V12	53
S 5.0	22	(United Kingdom) John Wyer Automotive Engineering	(Mexico) Pedro Rodríguez (Finland) Leo Kinnunen	Porsche 917K	Porsche 5.0L Flat-12	4
P 3.0	4	(Italy) Autodelta SpA	(Italy) Teodoro Zeccoli (Italy) Carlo Facetti	Alfa Romeo T33/3-71	Alfa Romeo 3.0L V8	0

== Statistics ==
- Pole position: #22 John Wyer Automotive Engineering Porsche 917K (Pedro Rodriguez/Leo Kinnunen) - 1:40.48 (131.656 mph/211.881 km/h)
- Fastest lap: #31 SpA Ferrari SEFAC Ferrari 512M (Jacky Ickx)- 1:40.0 (132.051 mph/212.514 km/h)
- Time taken for winning car to cover scheduled distance: 5 hours, 8 minutes and 4.67 seconds
- Average Speed: 195.592 km/h (121.535 mph)
- Weather conditions: Sunny

World Sportscar Championship
Previous race: Watkins Glen 6 Hours	1970 season	Next race: 1971 1000km of Buenos Aires
