= 1970 World Sportscar Championship =

Racing tournament

Seasons
- ← 1969 1971 →

The 1970 World Sportscar Championship season was the 18th season of FIA World Sportscar Championship motor racing. It featured the 1970 International Championship for Makes and the 1970 International Cup for GT Cars, which were contested concurrently from 31 January to 11 October over a ten race series. The International Championship for Makes, which was open to Group 6 Sports-Prototypes, Group 5 Sports Cars and Group 4 Special GT Cars, was won by German manufacturer Porsche. The International Cup for GT Cars was also won by Porsche.

== Schedule ==
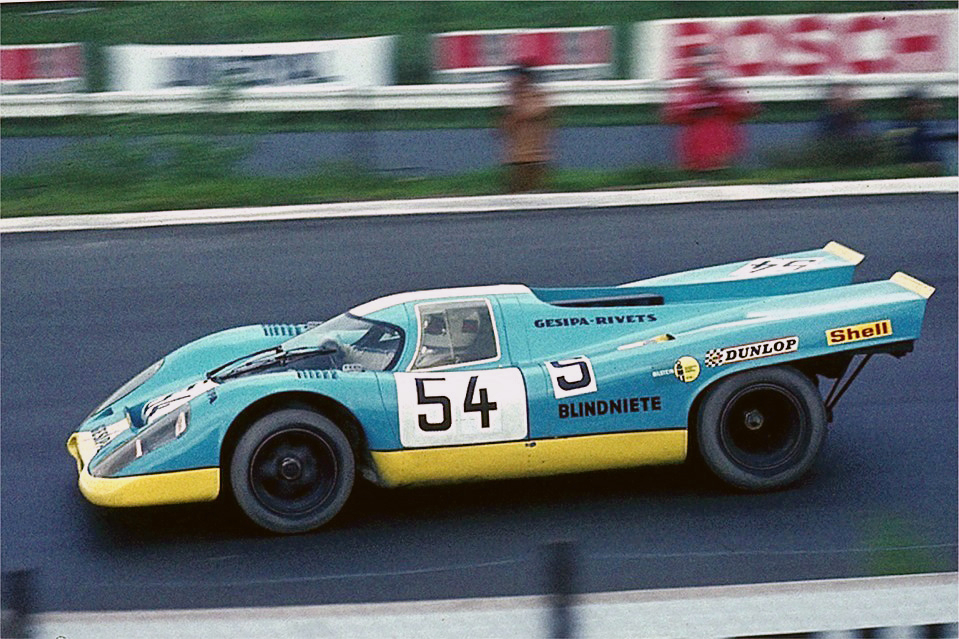
Porsche won the 1970 International Championship for Makes with its 917 (pictured) and 908/3 models

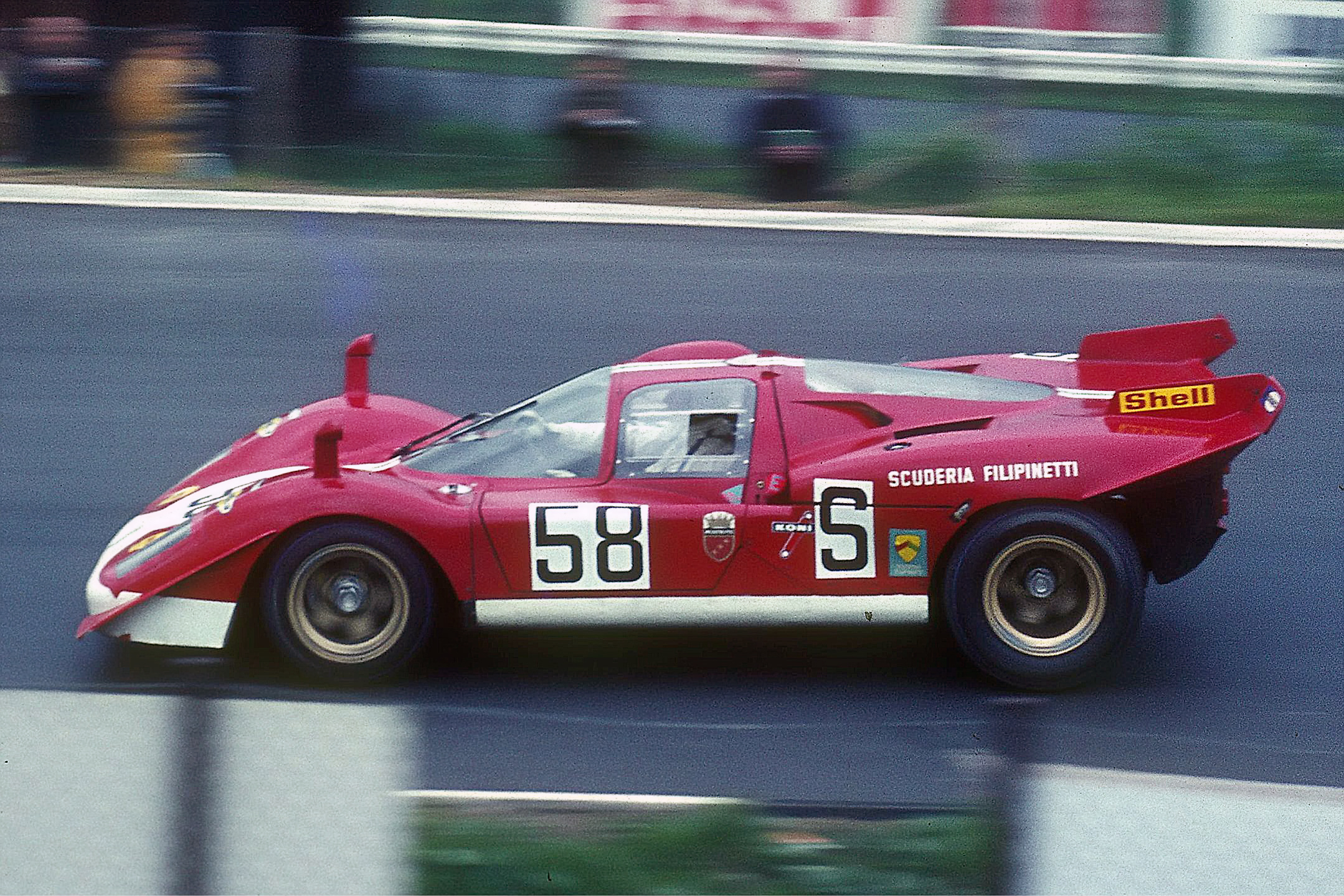
Ferrari placed second with the 512S

Rnd	Race	Circuit or Location	Date
1	(United States) 24 Hours of Daytona	Daytona International Speedway	31 January; 1 February
2	(United States) 12 Hours of Sebring	Sebring International Raceway	21 March
3	(United Kingdom) BOAC 1000km^{†}	Brands Hatch	12 April
4	(Italy) 1000km Monza	Autodromo Nazionale Monza	25 April
5	(Italy) Targa Florio	Circuito delle Madonie	3 May
6	(Belgium) 1000km Spa	Circuit de Spa-Francorchamps	17 May
7	(Germany) 1000km Nürburgring	Nürburgring	31 May
8	(France) 24 Hours of Le Mans	Circuit de la Sarthe	13 June; 14 June
9	(United States) Watkins Glen 6 Hours	Watkins Glen International	11 July
10	(Austria) Austrian 1000km	Österreichring	11 October

† - The BOAC 1000 km was open to Group 6 Sports-Prototypes and Group 5 Sports Cars only. GT Cars did not participate.

== Season results ==
=== Races ===
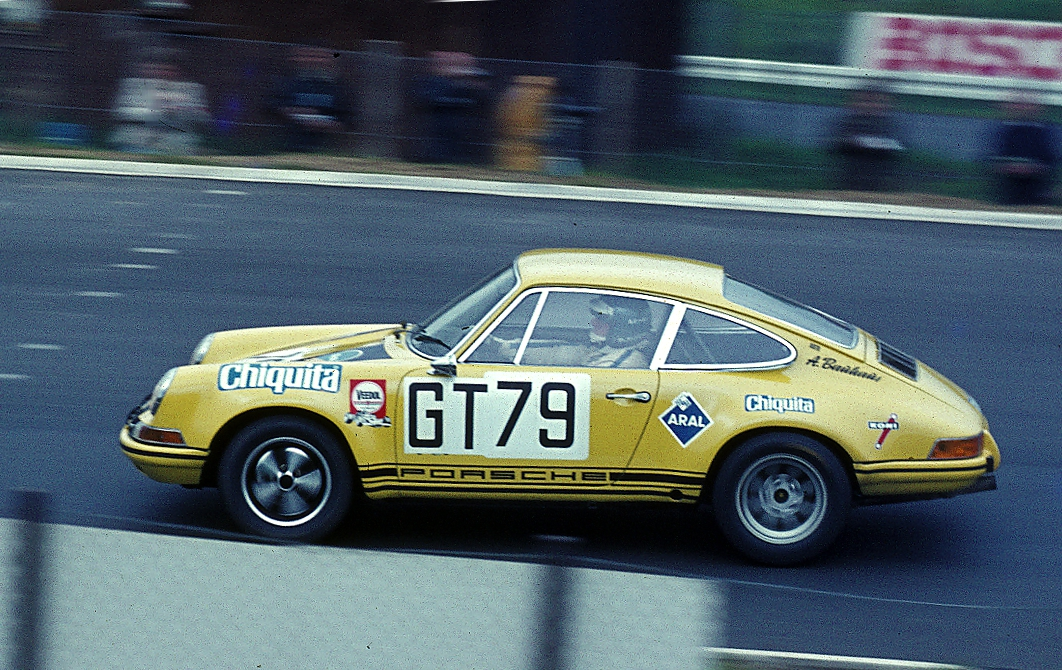
Porsche won the 1970 International Cup for GT Cars with its 911 (pictured) and 914/6 models

Rnd	Circuit	Sportscar Winning Team	GT Winning Team	Results
Rnd	Circuit	Sportscar Winning Drivers	GT Winning Drivers	Results
1	Daytona	(United Kingdom) #2 John Wyer Automotive	(United States) #7 Owens Corning Racing	Results
1	Daytona	(Mexico) Pedro Rodriguez (Finland) Leo Kinnunen (United Kingdom) Brian Redman	(United States) Jerry Thompson (United States) John Mahler	Results
2	Sebring	(Italy) #21 SpA Ferrari SEFAC	(United States) #1 Troy Promotions	Results
2	Sebring	(Italy) Ignazio Giunti (Italy) Nino Vaccarella (United States) Mario Andretti	(United States) Tony DeLorenzo (United States) Dick Lang	Results
3	Brands Hatch	(United Kingdom) #10 John Wyer Automotive	None	Results
3	Brands Hatch	(Mexico) Pedro Rodriguez (Finland) Leo Kinnunen		Results
4	Monza	(United Kingdom) #7 John Wyer Automotive	(Italy) #87 Brescia Corse	Results
4	Monza	(Mexico) Pedro Rodriguez (Finland) Leo Kinnunen	(Italy) Giuseppe Schenetti (Italy) Sergio Zerbini	Results
5	Targa Florio	(United Kingdom) #12 John Wyer Automotive	(Italy) #174 HF Squadra Corse	Results
5	Targa Florio	(Switzerland) Jo Siffert (United Kingdom) Brian Redman	(Italy) Sandro Munari (Italy) Claudio Maglioli	Results
6	Spa-Francorchamps	(United Kingdom) #24 John Wyer Automotive	(Switzerland) #59 Bernard Cheneviére	Results
6	Spa-Francorchamps	(Switzerland) Jo Siffert (United Kingdom) Brian Redman	(Switzerland) Bernard Cheneviére (Switzerland) Claude Haldi	Results
7	Nürburgring	(Austria) #22 Porsche Salzburg	(Germany) #79 Dieter Fröhlich	Results
7	Nürburgring	(United Kingdom) Vic Elford (Germany) Kurt Ahrens Jr.	(Germany) Dieter Fröhlich (Finland) Pauli Toivonen	Results
8	La Sarthe	(Austria) #23 Porsche Salzburg	(France) #40 Etablissement Sonauto	Results
8	La Sarthe	(Germany) Hans Herrmann (United Kingdom) Richard Attwood	(France) Claude Ballot-Léna (France) Guy Chasseuil	Results
9	Watkins Glen	(United Kingdom) #2 John Wyer Automotive	(United States) #5 Bob Grossman	Results
9	Watkins Glen	(Mexico) Pedro Rodriguez (Finland) Leo Kinnunen	(United States) Bob Grossman (United States) Don Yenko	Results
10	Österreichring	(United Kingdom) #23 John Wyer Automotive	(Germany) #51 Peter-Ernst Strähle	Results
10	Österreichring	(Switzerland) Jo Siffert (United Kingdom) Brian Redman	(Germany) Günter Steckkönig (Germany) Ferfried von Hohenzollern	Results

=== International Championship for Makes ===
Points were awarded for the first six places in each race on a 9-6-4-3-2-1 basis. Manufacturers were only awarded points for their highest placed car with no points awarded for positions filled by other cars from the same manufacturer. These cars could deny other brands from scoring points, though. The 1-2-3-4 finish of Porsche at the Brands Hatch race limited Ferrari to 5th place and only 2 points.

No points were awarded for positions filled by cars other than Group 6 Sports-Prototypes, Group 5 Sports Cars and Group 4 Special GT Cars.

Out of the ten rounds in the championship, only the best seven results counted towards the points total for each manufacturer. Discarded points are shown within brackets in the following table.

Pos	Manufacturer	(United States) DAY	(United States) SEB	(United Kingdom) BRH	(Italy) MZA	(Italy) TGA	(Belgium) SPA	(Germany) NÜR	(France) LMS	(United States) WGL	(Austria) ÖST	Total
1	(Germany) Porsche	9	(6)	9	9	9	9	9	9	(9)	(9)	63
2	(Italy) Ferrari	4	9	(2)	6	4	6	4	(3)	4		37
3	(Italy) Alfa Romeo		4								6	10
4	(France) Matra-Simca		2		2							4
5	(United States) Chevrolet	1							1			2

=== International Cup for GT Cars ===
Points were awarded for the first six places in the GT category at each race on a 9-6-4-3-2-1 basis. Manufacturers were only given points for their highest finishing car with no points awarded for positions filled by other cars from the same manufacturer.

Only the best seven results were retained towards the championship total of each manufacturer. Discarded points are shown within brackets in the following table.

The Grand Touring Car category did not participate in Round 3 at Brands Hatch.

Pos	Manufacturer	Rd 1	Rd 2	Rd 4	Rd 5	Rd 6	Rd 7	Rd 8	Rd 9	Rd 10	Total
1	(Germany) Porsche	(3)	4	9		9	9	6	9	9	55
2	(United States) Chevrolet	9	9					9			27
3	(Italy) Lancia				9						9
4	(France) Alpine				1	3					4
4	(United Kingdom) Lotus								4		4
5	(United Kingdom) British Leyland	1									1

== The cars ==
The following models contributed towards the net point scores of their respective manufacturers.

International Championship for Makes

- Porsche 917K, 917L & 908/03
- Ferrari 512S
- Alfa Romeo T33/3
- Matra-Simca MS650
- Chevrolet Corvette

International Cup for GT Cars

- Porsche 911S, Porsche 911T & Porsche 914/6 GT
- Chevrolet Corvette & Chevrolet Camaro
- Lancia Fulvia HF
- Alpine A110
- Lotus Europa
- MGB (British Leyland)
