= 1970 1000 km of Nürburgring =

Sports car endurance race in Germany

The Nürburgring (1967–1982)

The 1970 1000km of Nürburgring was an endurance race held at the Nürburgring Nordschleife, Nürburg, West Germany on May 31, 1970. It was the seventh round of the 1970 International Championship for Makes.

== Pre-race ==
The Nürburgring was bumpy and narrow until resurfaced and widened somewhat in late 1970 and early 1971 after Formula 1 had boycotted the Ring, moving the August 1970 German Grand Prix to the modern Hockenheimring which already was signed with Armco.

Earlier in 1970, the 1000 km race weekend was marred by the fatal accident of Finnish driver Hans Laine in a Porsche 908/02. While attempting to qualify for the race at the end of Saturday's qualifying session, Laine damaged one of the front sections of his car; and while he was on the Döttinger Höhe straight going at full speed over one of the humps near the Antonius Bridge, his 908/02 flew into the air, did a full backflip and landed back on the track and rolled a number of times. Although Laine was alive and conscious after the accident, fuel was leaking and Laine could not get out of the car. Track marshals were able to get to the wrecked Porsche, but then the car burst into flames. The marshals only had small extinguishers that was not enough to put out the inferno and Laine perished in the fire. He was 25, and was survived by his wife and 5-month year old daughter; he was one of 6 racers to die at the Nürburgring that year. Laine's co-driver, Dutchman Gijs van Lennep had a similar incident at the same place on the track, although he was able to avoid causing any damage to the car. The racing team Laine drove for withdrew another one of its entries, a Porsche 917K but a Porsche 911 driven by Finnish rally driver Pauli Tovionen and entered by Laine's team won the GT's with an engine larger than 2 liters class.

John Wyer and Porsche agreed that both works teams would use the 908/03, a car type first used at the Targa Florio four weeks earlier. At that event, 908/02 and 908/03 models finished in first, second, fourth, and fifth positions. The Salzburg 908/03 recorded a DNF, while Ferrari 512S models finished third and sixth. Developed for mountain roads, the 908/03 was used for the Nürburgring instead of the 917K. John Wyer's team and Porsche Salzburg each ran two of the vehicles.

Ferrari in 1969 also had a 3 liter prototype, the Ferrari 312 P, but sold all chassis to NART and did not build new ones just for two races. They brought three open top versions of the 512S though, the Spyders, backed up by a closed Scuderia Filipinetti Berlinetta. Ferrari also brought F1 drivers that had already won the German Grand Prix, John Surtees in 1963 and 1964, and Jacky Ickx in 1969 (and again in 1972), but Ickx recently had injured his wrist. Ickx was considered to be the best Nürburgring driver in the world at that time, next to defending Formula One world champion Jackie Stewart, as the two split all German GP wins at the Ring among them from 1968 to 1973. Even with the experienced John Surtees who knew the long circuit well and had much success at the challenging mountain circuit in the past, things did not look good for Ferrari- as most of the works Porsche drivers- including Jo Siffert, Brian Redman, Hans Herrmann and Vic Elford were all known to be Nürburgring specialists and were very fast around this circuit, and elsewhere.

Anyway, Ickx was in the No. 56 car, entered with Surtees and Peter Schetty. After the car had clocked a competitive 7:57.1, Schetty totalled it on the fast uphill section Kesselchen. Otherwise, qualifying was dominated by the works Porsches, the only cars running under 8 minutes and in the race. They took the first four positions on the grid with the 7:43.3 pole position time only a second slower than the front row times set by Ickx and Stewart for the 1969 German Grand Prix; pole position went to the Jo Siffert/Brian Redman car, closely followed by Pedro Rodriguez/Leo Kinnunen, and Vic Elford/Kurt Ahrens Jr. also in the 40s. Hans Herrmann/Richard Attwood were not as fast, followed by a works Alfa Romeo T33/3 of Rolf Stommelen/Piers Courage as the fifth 3-liter-prototype, at 8:00.5. Three other Alfas did not show up. The two remaining works Ferrari 512S Spyders followed, No. 57 Ignazio Giunti/Arturo Merzario and No. 55 John Surtees/Nino Vaccarella, close (8:01.7) and somewhat off pace (8:12.3). The private 512S and the private Gesipa 917K were 8th and 9th on the grid, 8:15.9 and 8:17.9. A fleet of private 908/02 followed.

== Race ==
After the start Rodriguez went ahead and Siffert, the pole sitter, was also overtaken by Giunti's powerful Ferrari on the back straight. This allowed Rodriguez to get a good lead as Siffert could not pass in the tight sections and even waved his fist at Giunti which could not complete the 3rd lap due to fuel injection problems. Thus neither Merzario nor Ickx could take over.

Siffert was fast at the Ring and eroded Rodriguez's lead by about 1.5 seconds per lap. At lap 8 Siffert went ahead, but Rodriguez answered back with a best lap (new prototype record 7:50.4 174.758 kph). Anyway, Siffert managed to gain about 8 seconds on Rodriguez, before the pit stops which, on this long track, had to be made in the same lap. Rodriguez handed off his car to Kinnunen and Siffert to Redman; but the Siffert-Redman car did not restart, was delayed and went back to second place. Redman went after Kinnunen and in two laps was poised to overtake him; under pressure Kinnunen, who had been affected by his friend Hans Laine's death the day before, crashed his 908/03 after going over a jump at the 14 kilometer mark (near the Karrusell), flipping in the air and Redman went right underneath his crashing teammate. This put the Siffert/Redman car into the lead, but by the end of the 22nd lap, Redman brought his 908/03 in due to faltering oil pressure. The engine then failed due to lack of oil, and the Elford/Ahrens 908/03 took the lead, ran without a hitch and went on to win the race; followed by the other Salzburg 908/03 with soon to be Le Mans winners Herrmann/Attwood, and one lap behind, the remaining works Ferrari of Surtees/Vaccarella which had problems with steering. Another lap down was the Filipinetti 512S on 4th, followed by no less than five older private Porsches, among them two Martini 908/02s and the 907 that won the P 2.0 class. The one competitive works Alfa Romeo of Rolf Stommelen/Piers Courage went out after 11 laps with a broken shock absorber. The lone 917K did not last long, either.

With this victory at their home event, Porsche claimed the International Championship for Makes over Ferrari, having won 6 events to the Sebring win of Ferrari, with the final three championship races also to be won by Porsche. After the eight car assault on Le Mans failed, Ferrari re-focussed on F1, with chances to win both titles until the end. The Scuderia also developed a modified 512M similar to the 917K, but did not make another factory effort in 1971 with the big sportscars. Instead, they introduced the 312PB prototype that would be raced in championship until 1973.

This would be the last ever major international race on the original Nürburgring with no safety features on it. For the next year's race, the Nordschleife was rebuilt, which included making the surface smoother and lining the circuit with Armco and adding run-off areas wherever possible. The 1970 German Grand Prix was originally supposed to be at the Nürburgring that year, but with Laine's accident being the third racing fatality at the Ring in 1970, and the deaths of 2 Formula One drivers until early June, the Formula One circus moved temporarily to Hockenheim, which prompted the Ring to be rebuilt over the winter. 3 more drivers and a motorcyclist were to die at the Ring that year, bringing the total death tally for the circuit in 1970 up to a very dubious seven in one year.

== Official results ==
The Nürburgring in 1970

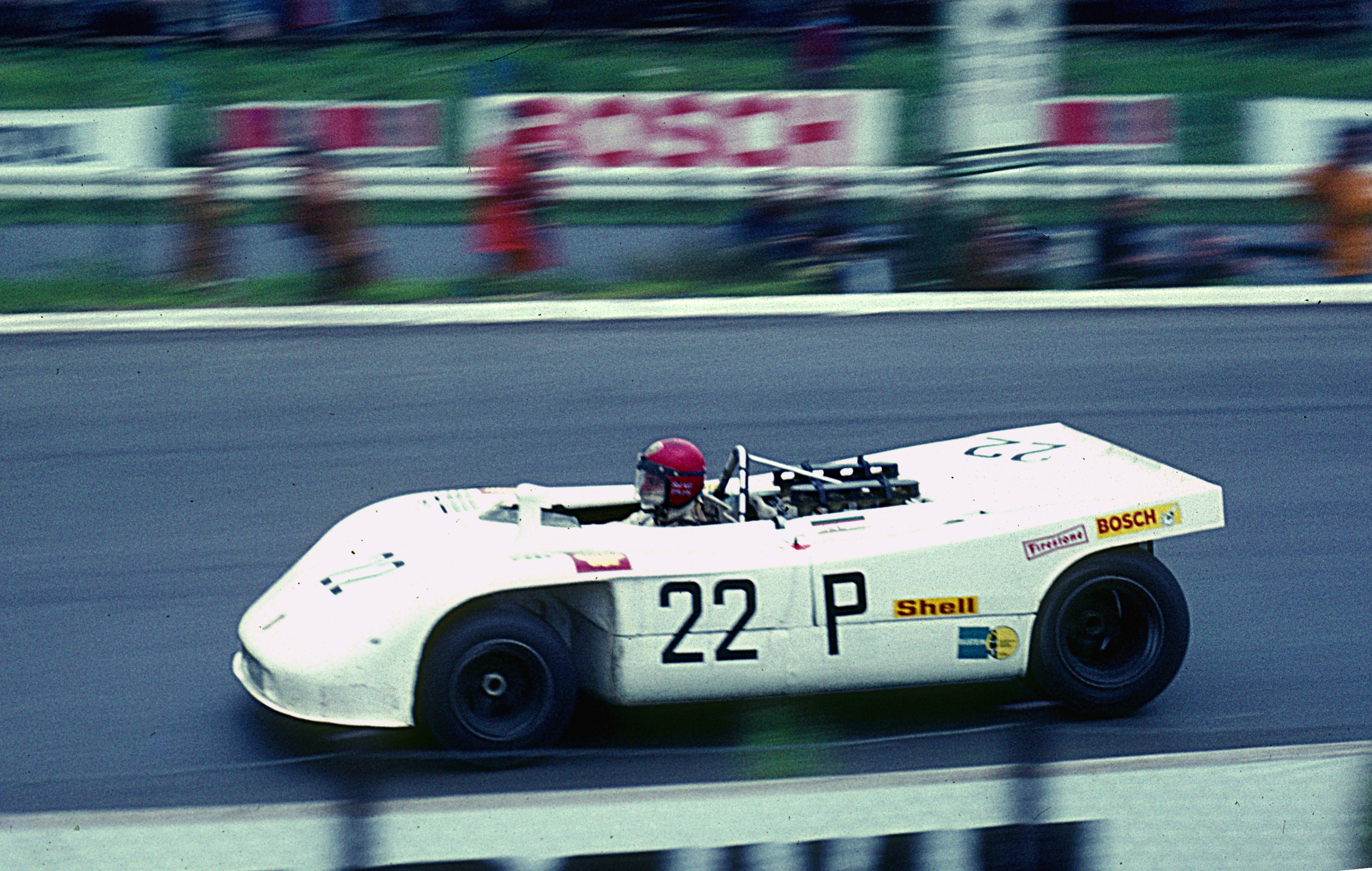
Vic Elford in a Porsche 908/03, winner of the race together with Kurt Ahrens

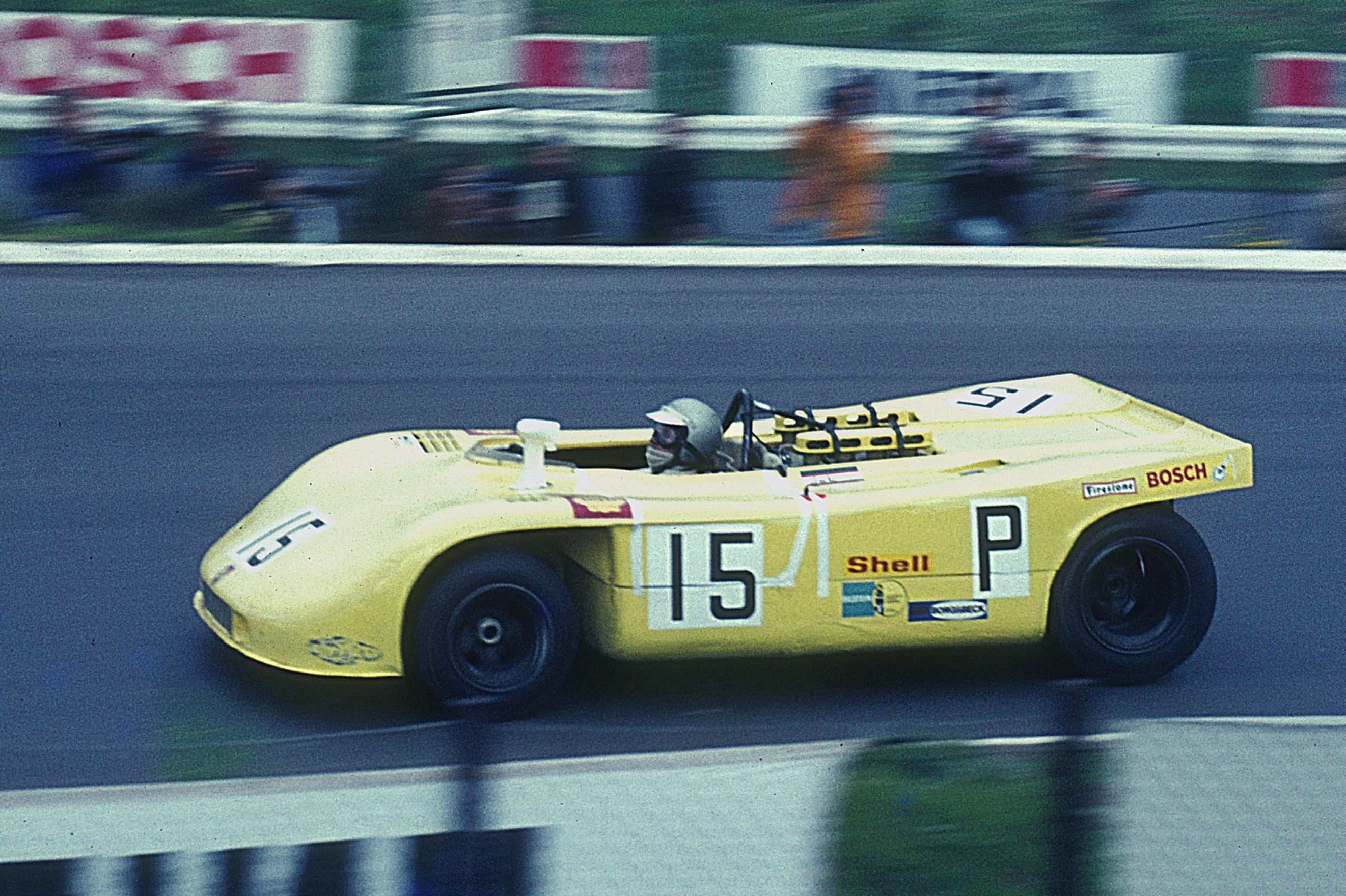
Hans Herrmann in a works Porsche 908/03, this car finished 2nd

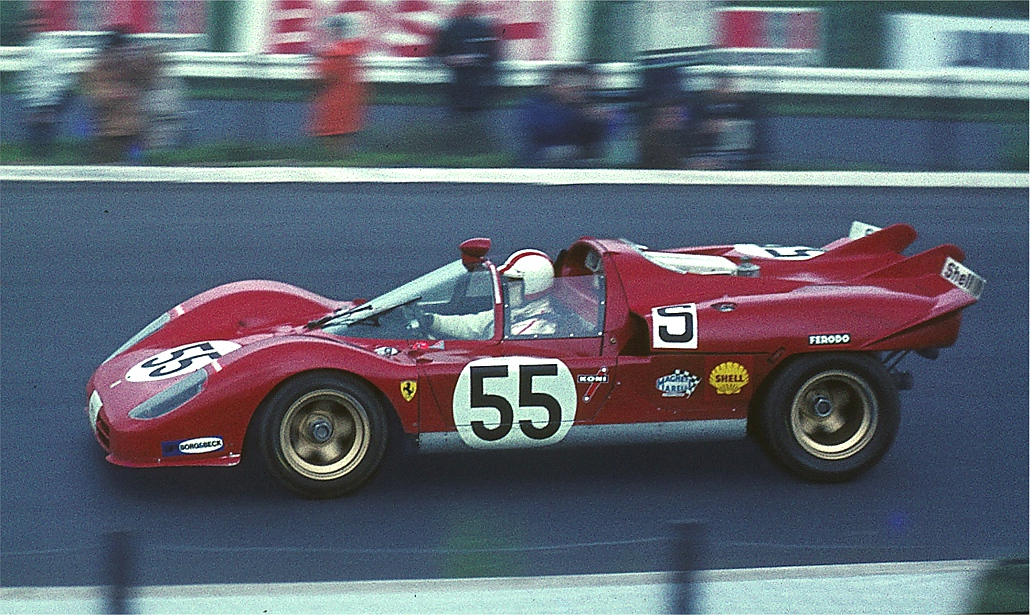
Nino Vaccarella in a works Ferrari 512S Spyder, this car finished 3rd and 1st in class

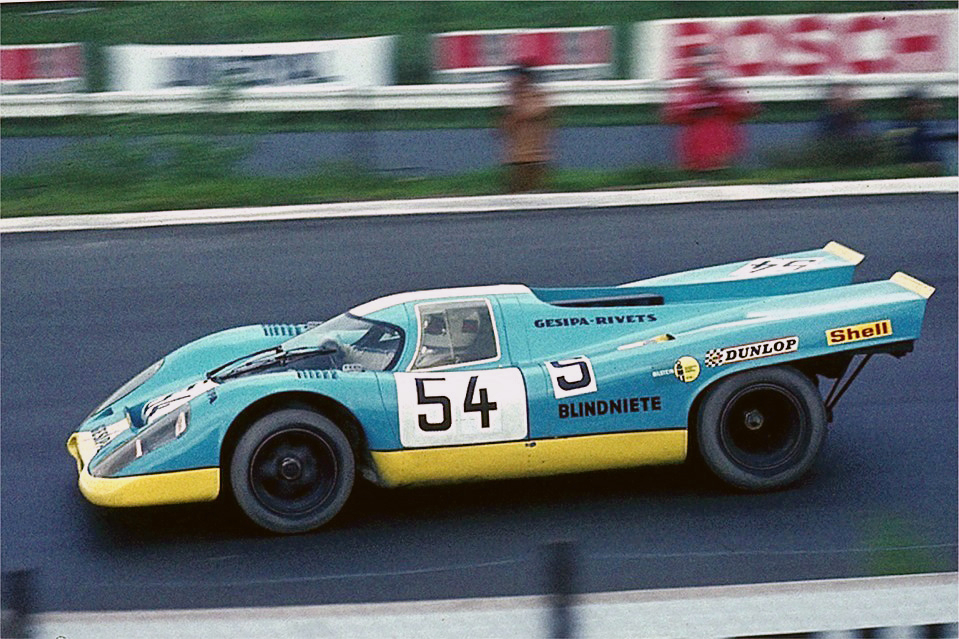
Helmut Kelleners in a private Porsche 917K, this car qualified ninth but then retired due to wheel bearing problems

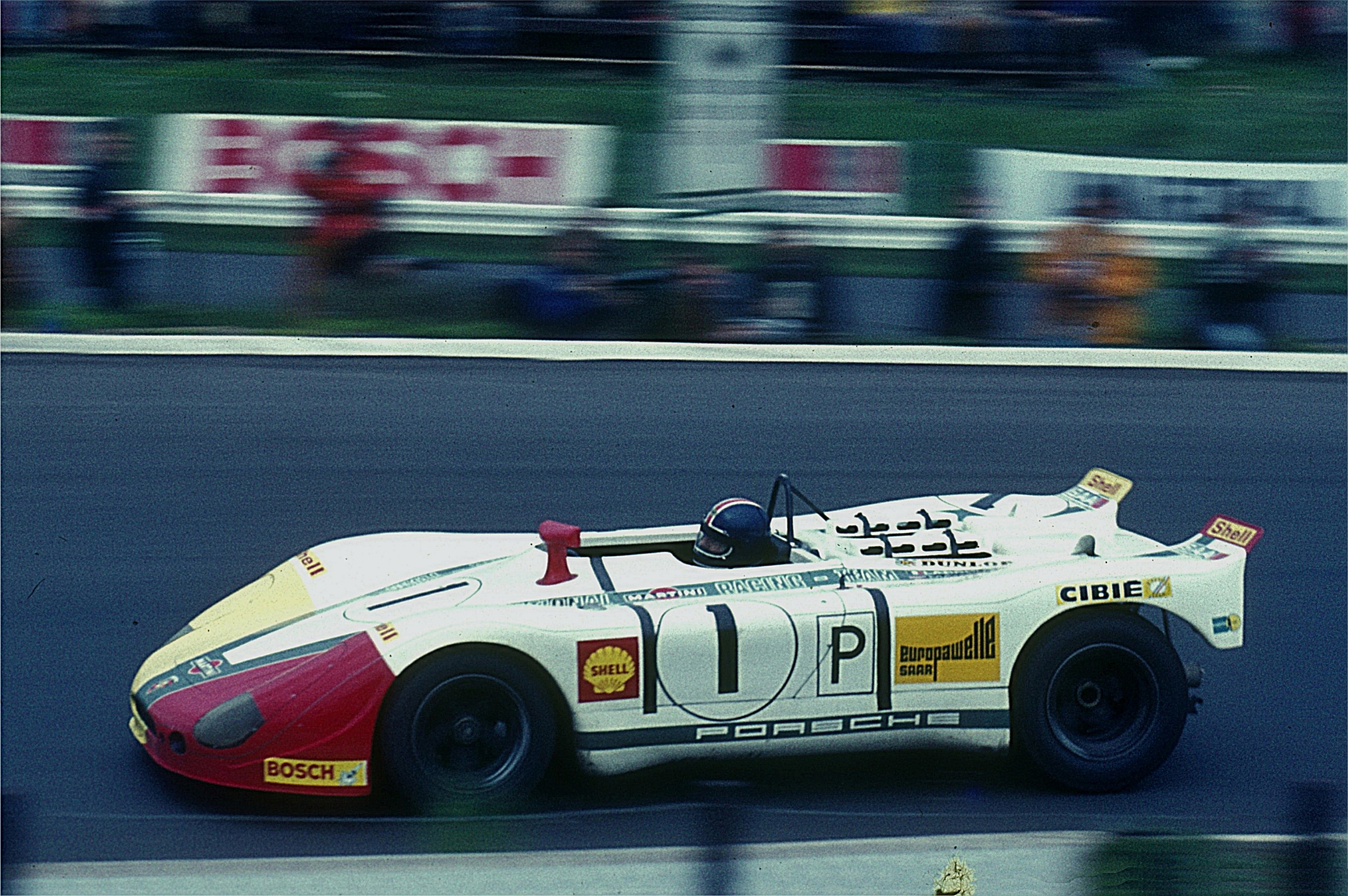
Gerard Larrousse in a Martini Porsche 908/02. This car finished 5th overall and 3rd in class.

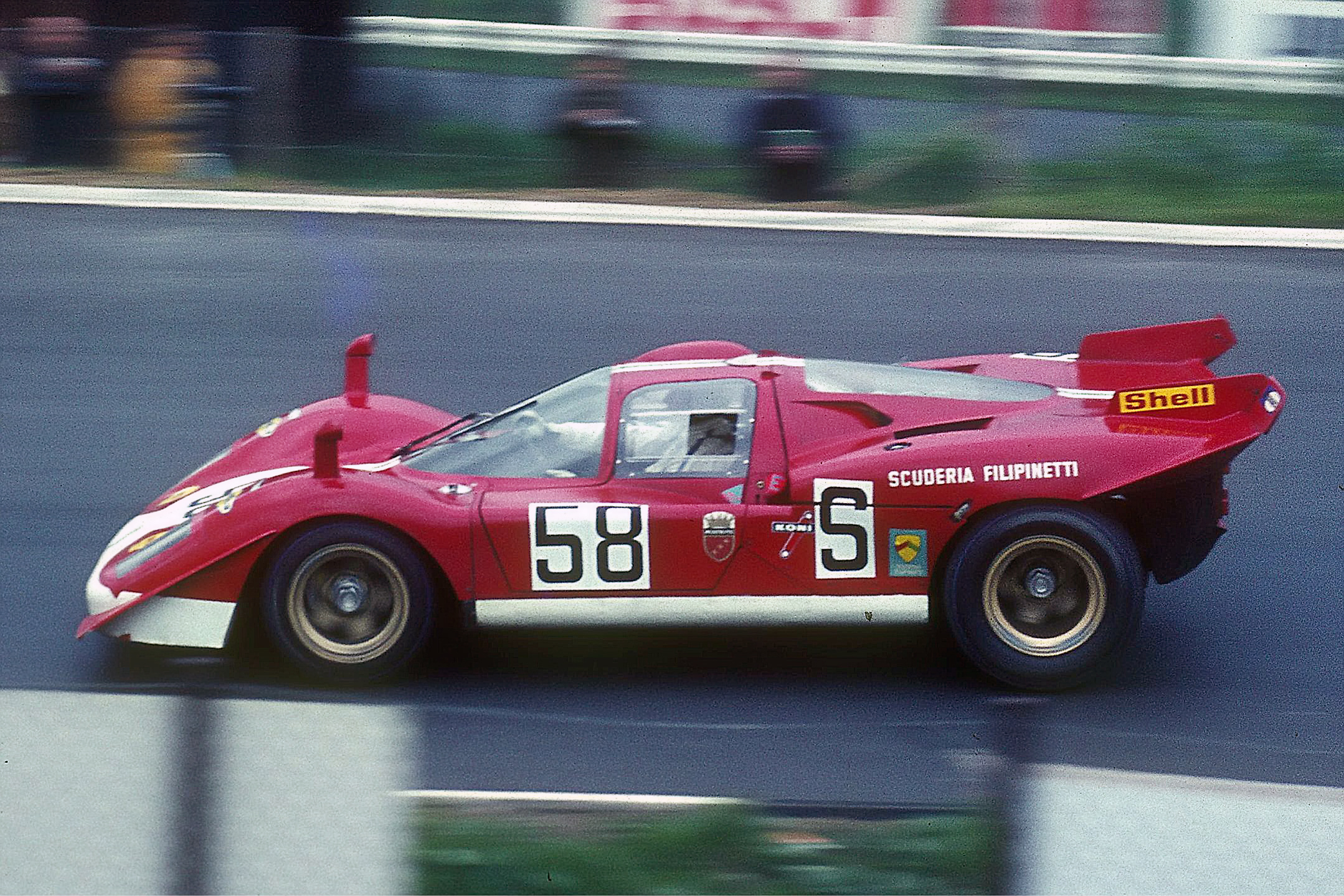
Mike Parkes in a privately entered standard Ferrari 512S. This car finished 4th overall and 2nd in class.

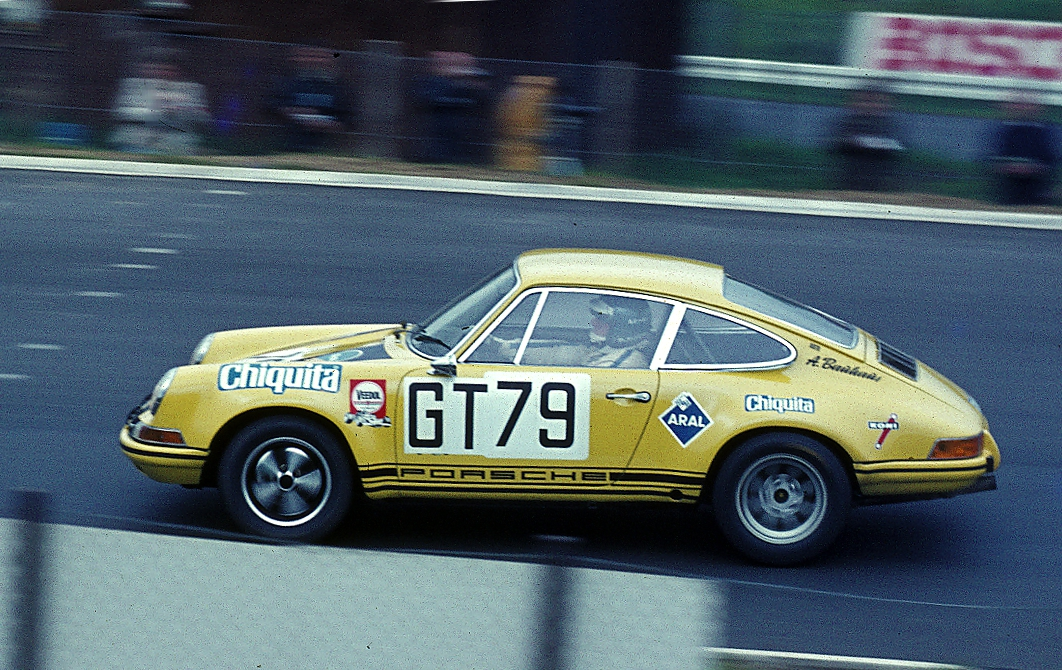
Dieter Fröhlich in a Racing Team AAW Porsche 911S. This car won the GT +2.0 class and finished 14th overall. The team that fielded this car was the same that Hans Laine drove for.

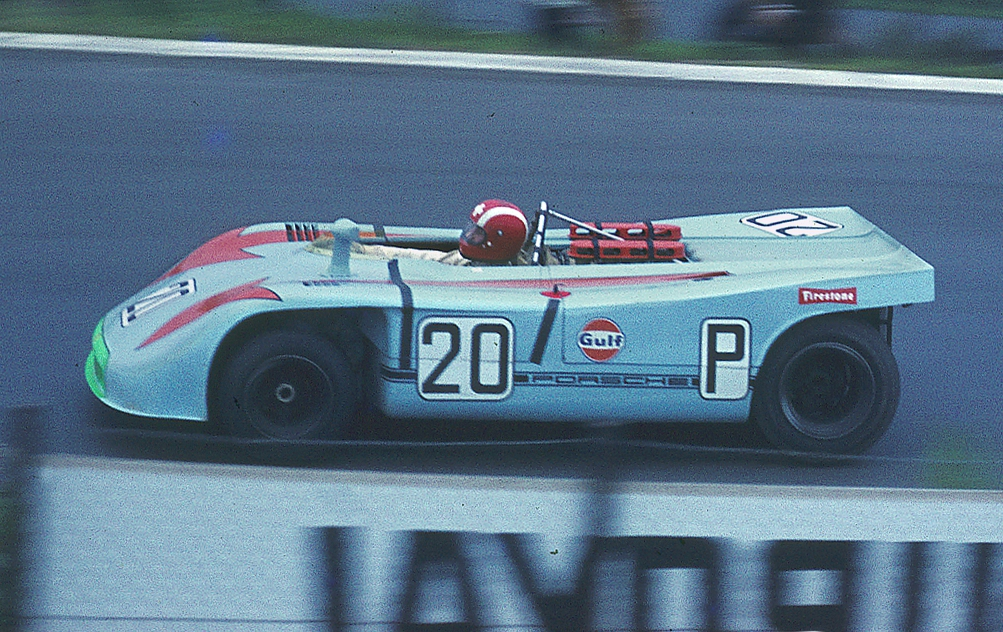
Jo Siffert in a works/John Wyer Porsche 908/03, this car retired with engine failure after leading 11 laps

Pos	Class	No	Team	Drivers	Chassis	Engine	Laps
1	P 3.0	22	(Austria) Porsche Salzburg	(United Kingdom) Vic Elford (West Germany) Kurt Ahrens Jr.	Porsche 908/03 #008	Porsche 3.0L Flat-8	44
2	P 3.0	15	(Austria) Porsche Salzburg	(West Germany) Hans Herrmann (United Kingdom) Richard Attwood	Porsche 908/03	Porsche 3.0L Flat-8	44
3	S 5.0	55	(Italy) SpA Ferrari SEFAC	(United Kingdom) John Surtees (Italy) Nino Vaccarella	Ferrari 512S Spyder	Ferrari 5.0L V12	43
4	S 5.0	4	(Switzerland) Scuderia Filipinetti	(United Kingdom) Mike Parkes (Switzerland) Herbert Müller	Ferrari 512S	Ferrari 5.0L V12	42
5	P 3.0	1	(West Germany) Martini International Racing	(France) Gérard Larrousse (Austria) Helmut Marko	Porsche 908/02	Porsche 3.0L Flat-8	42
6	P 3.0	2	(West Germany) Martini International Racing	(Austria) Rudi Lins (West Germany) Willy Kauhsen	Porsche 908/02	Porsche 3.0L Flat-8	42
7	P 3.0	11	(West Germany) German BG Racing Team	(West Germany) Karl von Wendt (West Germany) Gerhard Koch	Porsche 908/02	Porsche 3.0L Flat-8	41
8	P 3.0	4	(West Germany) Asahi Pentax Racing Team	(West Germany) Sepp Greger (West Germany) Helmut Leuze	Porsche 908/02	Porsche 3.0L Flat-8	40
9	P 2.0	29	(Switzerland) Andre Wicky Racing Team	(Switzerland) Andre Wicky (Portugal) Mário Cabral	Porsche 907	Porsche 1.9L Flat-6	39
10	P 2.0	14	(Belgium) Levi's International Racing	(Belgium) Yves Deprez (Belgium) Julien Vernaeve	Chevron B16	Mazda 1.0L 2-Rotor	39
11	P 3.0	17	(West Germany) Asahi Pentax Racing Team	(West Germany) Dieter Basche (West Germany) Helmut Kelleners (West Germany) Jürgen Neuhaus	Porsche 908/02	Porsche 3.0L Flat-8	38
12	P 3.0	31	(West Germany) Scuderia Auto-Neuser	(West Germany) Anton Fischhaber (West Germany) Dieter Schmid	Porsche 906	Porsche 1.9L Flat-6	38
13	P 2.0	31	(United Kingdom) Mark Konig	(United Kingdom) Mark Konig (United Kingdom) Tony Lanfranchi	Nomad Mk.2	BRM 2.0L V8	37
14	GT +2.0	79	(Finland) Racing Team AAW	(West Germany) Dieter Fröhlich (Finland) Pauli Toivonen	Porsche 911S	Porsche 2.2L Flat-6	37
15	GT +2.0	84	(West Germany) Auto Kremer	(West Germany) Erwin Kremer (West Germany) Günther Huber	Porsche 911S	Porsche 2.2L Flat-6	37
16	GT +2.0	85	(West Germany) Peter Kersten	(West Germany) Clemens Schickentanz (West Germany) Hans-Joachim Stuck	Porsche 911S	Porsche 2.2L Flat-6	37
17	S 2.0	67	(United Kingdom) Roger Heavens	(United Kingdom) Roger Heavens (United Kingdom) Mike Garton	Chevron B8	BMW 1.9L I4	37
18	GT; 2.0	53	(Austria) Porsche Salzburg	(West Germany) Georg Loos (West Germany) Franz Pesch	Porsche 911L	Porsche 2.0L Flat-6	36
19	GT; 2.0	88	(West Germany) Scuderia Lufthansa	(Belgium) Robert F. Huhn (Belgium) Günther Schwarz	Porsche 914/6 GT	Porsche 1.9L Flat-6	36
20	GT; 2.0	93	(West Germany) Hahn Motors	(Belgium) Peter Kaiser (Belgium) Günter Steckkönig	Porsche 914/6 GT	Porsche 1.9L Flat-6	36
21	GT; 2.0	101	(West Germany) Hülpert & Co.	(West Germany) Alexander Nolte (Belgium) Werner Christmann	Porsche 914/6 GT	Porsche 1.9L Flat-6	36
22	S 5.0	60	(United Kingdom) Ecurie Evergreen	(United Kingdom) Piers Forrester (United Kingdom) Alain de Cadenet	Ford GT40 Mk.I	Ford 4.9L V8	35
23	GT; 2.0	96	(West Germany) Autohaus Max Moritz	(West Germany) Gerd F. Quist (Belgium) Dietrich Krumm	Porsche 914/6 GT	Porsche 1.9L Flat-6	35
24	GT; 2.0	55	(France) Jean-Marie Jacquemin	(France) Jean-Marie Jacquemin (Belgium) William Scheeren (France) Bernard Palayer	Alpine A110	Renault 1.3L I4	35
25	GT +2.0	83	(Switzerland) Claude Haldi	(Switzerland) Claude Haldi (Switzerland) Eric Chapuis	Porsche 911S	Porsche 2.2L Flat-6	34
26	GT; 2.0	91	(West Germany) Bernd Becker	(West Germany) Bernd Becker (West Germany) Elmar Clever	Porsche 911S	Porsche 2.0L Flat-6	34
27	P 1.6	42	(West Germany) Dieter Weizinger	(West Germany) Dieter Weizinger (West Germany) Wilhelm Bisterfeld	Alfa Romeo GTA Junior	Alfa Romeo 1.6L I4	34
28	GT; 2.0	94	(West Germany) Jörg Klasen	(West Germany) Peter Otto (West Germany) Jörg Klasen	Alfa Romeo GTA	Alfa Romeo 2.0L I4	34
29	GT +2.0	97	(United Kingdom) Ecurie Evergreen	(United States) David Weir (United Kingdom) Mike Ogier	Porsche 911T	Porsche 1.9L Flat-6	32
30	S 2.0	69	(United Kingdom) Worcestershire Racing Association	(United Kingdom) James Tangye (United Kingdom) Paul Vestey	Chevron B8	BMW 1.9L I4	32
31	S 2.0	69	(United Kingdom) Edward Negus	(United Kingdom) Edward Negus (United Kingdom) Brian Joscelyne	Chevron B8	BMW 1.9L I4	30
32	P 1.6	43	(United Kingdom) Stanley Robinson	(United Kingdom) Stanley Robinson (United Kingdom) John Blanckley	Unipower GT	BMC 2.0L I4	29
33	P 2.0	93	(United Kingdom) AM Graphics Racing	(United Kingdom) Andrew Mylius (United Kingdom) Gerry Birrell	Gropa CMC	Ford 1.6L I4	28
34	S 2.0	38	(United Kingdom) Red Rose Racing	(United Kingdom) John Bridges (United Kingdom) Peter Lawson	Chevron B16	Ford 1.6L I4	28

=== Did Not Finish ===
Class	No	Team	Drivers	Chassis	Engine	Laps
S 2.0	66	(West Germany) Nikolaus Killenberg	(West Germany) Nikolaus Killenberg (West Germany) Georg Bialas	Chevron B8	BMW 1.9L I4	24
P 3.0	20	(United Kingdom) John Wyer Automotive Engineering	(Switzerland) Jo Siffert (United Kingdom) Brian Redman	Porsche 908/03	Porsche 3.0L Flat-8	22
P 1.6	38	(United Kingdom) Daren Cars Ltd.	(United Kingdom) Jeremy Richardson (United Kingdom) Allistair Cowin	Daren Mk.2	Ford 1.8L I4	22
S 2.0	70	(Switzerland) Andre Wicky Racing Team	(West Germany) Willy Meier (Italy) Mario Ilotte	Porsche 910	Porsche 1.9L Flat-6	21
S 2.0	68	(United Kingdom) Worcestershire Racing Association	(United Kingdom) John Bamford (United Kingdom) Peter Creasey	Chevron B8	BMW 1.8L I4	20
S 2.0	23	(West Germany) Hans-Dieter Blatzheim	(West Germany) Hans-Dieter Blatzheim (West Germany) Ernst Kraus	Porsche 907 Spyder	Porsche 1.9L Flat-6	19
S 2.0	64	(United Kingdom) Intertech Steering Wheels	(United Kingdom) Tony Goodwin (United Kingdom) Peter Taggart	Chevron B8	BMW 1.9L I4	15
GT +2.0	81	(West Germany) Hediri Racing	(Austria) Peter Peter (West Germany) Dieter Eymann	Shelby GT350	Ford 4.7L V8	13
P 3.0	12	(United Kingdom) Keith Grant	(United Kingdom) Peter Gaydon (United Kingdom) Keith Grant	Brabham BT8	Climax 2.7L V8	12
P 3.0	16	(West Germany) Michael May	(West Germany) Hannelore Werner (West Germany) Mike Kranefuss	Ford Capri RS Turbo	Ford 2.3L Turbo V6	12
P 2.0	32	(United Kingdom) Philips Autoradio Racing	(United Kingdom) Guy Edwards (West Germany) Roger Enever	Astra RNR2	Ford 1.6L I4	12
P 3.0	6	(Italy) Autodelta SpA	(West Germany) Rolf Stommelen (United Kingdom) Piers Courage	Alfa Romeo T33/3	Alfa Romeo 3.0L V8	11
P 3.0	21	(United Kingdom) John Wyer Automotive Engineering	(Mexico) Pedro Rodríguez (Finland) Leo Kinnunen	Porsche 908/03	Porsche 3.0L Flat-8	11
S 5.0	54	(West Germany) Gesipa Racing Team	(West Germany) Helmut Kelleners (West Germany) Jürgen Neuhaus	Porsche 917K	Porsche 4.5L Flat-12	9
S 2.0	72	(United Kingdom) Martin Blackie	(United Kingdom) Martin Blackie (United Kingdom) Peter Humble	Chevron B8	BMW 1.9L I4	7
GT; 2.0	100	(West Germany) Martini BMW	(West Germany) Karl-Heinz Becker (West Germany) Friedheim Theissen	Porsche 911S	Porsche 2.0L Flat-6	7
P 3.0	16	(Argentina) Oreste Berta	(Argentina) Luis Di Palma (Argentina) Carlos Marincovitch	Berta LR	Ford DFV 3.0L V8	5
P 3.0	14	(United Kingdom) Max Wilson	(United Kingdom) Max Wilson (United Kingdom) Mac Daghorn	Lola T70P	BRM 3.0L V12	4
S 2.0	75	(United Kingdom) Northern Ireland Cars	(United Kingdom) John L'Amie (United Kingdom) Tommy Reid	Porsche 910	Porsche 1.9L Flat-6	4
S 5.0	57	(Italy) SpA Ferrari SEFAC	(Italy) Ignazio Giunti (Italy) Arturo Merzario	Ferrari 512S	Ferrari 5.0L V12	2

== Statistics ==
- Pole position: #24 John Wyer Automotive Engineering Porsche 908/03 (Jo Siffert/Brian Redman) - 7:43.3 (110.334 mph/177.566 km/h)
- Fastest lap: #25 John Wyer Automotive Engineering Porsche 908/03 (Pedro Rodriguez)- 7:50.4 (108.590 mph/174.758 km/h)
- Time taken for winning car to cover scheduled distance: 6 hours, 5 minutes and 21.2 seconds
- Average Speed: 165.003 km/h (102.528 mph)
- Weather conditions: Cloudy, overcast

World Sportscar Championship
Previous race: 1000km of Spa	1970 season	Next race: 24 Hours of Le Mans
