= 1970 1000 km of Spa-Francorchamps =

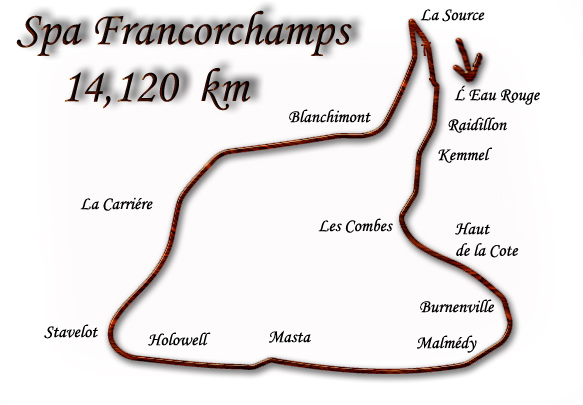
Spa-Francorchamps in 1970

The 1970 1000km of Spa-Francorchamps was an endurance race held at the Circuit de Spa-Francorchamps, Belgium on May 17, 1970. It was the sixth round of the 1970 International Championship for Makes.

== Pre-race ==
Prior to Formula One boycotting and then cancelling the 1969 Belgian Grand Prix, because of the dangers of the ultra-high speed 8.7 mi (14.1 km) Spa-Francorchamps circuit, the track was fitted with Armco barriers in some places and was generally made safer. The layout had not been changed, and the circuit was still extremely fast and demanding; racing records were smashed at this race by the prototypes. The old Spa layout was just about flat out for the entire 8.7 mile distance and the circuit sped into the rural countryside; whereas now, the circuit stays inside a part of the mountainous Ardennes forest. Lost corners like Burnenville, Malmedy, the Masta Kink, Stavelot and La Carriere were all 180+ mph and corners like Eau Rouge, Blanchimont and Clubhouse were 150+ mph. So every corner except the ultra-slow La Source hairpin was fast and there was never any let-up for the cars on this circuit aside from La Source. To add to the mental challenge, most of those corners had to be taken just slightly under flat out. Spa was the fastest circuit in Europe at that time, and the mental challenge of this Belgian circuit was that every corner was just as important as the next; if a driver lifted even just a little bit through any of the high-speed bends, they would lose 2–3 seconds from their lap time. If a driver made even the slightest mistake, they were very likely to have a high speed accident which in those safety-absent days almost always meant serious injury or death.

The works Porsche teams brought the 917K's back into action for this race. They had used the new 908/03's previously at the Targa Florio.

In qualifying, pole position went to the Gulf-Porsche 917K of Pedro Rodriguez/Leo Kinnunen, followed by the other Gulf-Porsche 917K of Jo Siffert/Brian Redman, the works Ferrari 512S of Jacky Ickx/John Surtees, a privately entered 917K of Helmut Kelleners/Jürgen Neuhaus, and another works Ferrari 512S of Ignazio Giunti/Nino Vaccarella. Rodriguez averaged over 157 mph (253 km/h)- a new average speed record on road circuits.

Both the Wyer Porsches and the Ferraris encountered problems. The Ferrari was unstable at medium speed; the Porsches shredded their tires at the very fast bends. Both Siffert and Redman had very hairy moments. Rodriguez was aware of them but, according to John Horseman, he just responded by driving even faster.

== Race ==
It rained before the start of the race, but by the time the race started, the track was already drying. The teams had to decide on what kind of tires to use. Siffert, Rodriguez and Ickx chose mix condition tires; most of the big bangers chose rain tires.

At the start, Siffert and Rodriguez were banging wheels going into Eau Rouge, with Siffert coming out best. At the second lap Ickx managed to get in touch with the Porsches. As at the third lap the big sports cars were lapping slower GTs, some changes in the lead happened. Siffert was passed by Rodriguez and Ickx, and then he got the lead again. He opened a gap of some seconds but never a large one. Rodriguez, trying hard, shred a tire. After one hour, the first pit stops took place. Siffert's pitstop was slow one and Ickx took the lead. For a while Siffert could not get near the Ferrari. But towards the end of his double stint, he got a message from the pits: an arrow was shown, meaning he was told to speed up and catch the Ferrari. Siffert did come closer to the Ferrari, and Rodriguez had also came closer, but neither were within striking distance. At the second pitstop, Ickx switched with John Surtees and Siffert with Redman. That day Surtees had, apparently, difficulty to deal with traffic and Redman had a very good stint. After some very exciting laps, Redman went ahead, Rodriguez came close, but he had to pit and later Kinnunen abandoned (gearbox). Redman took a large lead. At the last stint, Siffert was very far away but Ickx nevertheless tried hard to gain time. He did gain, but Siffert was informed of it by the pits and responded; the gap was stable from then on.

The race featured several prominent drivers of the era, including Jo Siffert, Jacky Ickx, Pedro Rodriguez, Brian Redman, and Vic Elford, and included competition between Ferrari and Porsche. During the event, Rodríguez recorded a lap of the Spa circuit in 3:16.5, averaging 160.513 mph (258.321 km/h). The Porsche driven by Siffert and Redman won the race, while the Ferrari shared by Ickx and John Surtees finished second.

Once the Formula One Belgian Grand Prix was held 3 weeks later (a race that Rodriguez won for BRM), Formula One cars struggled to get within 12 seconds of this time; although there was a chicane at Malmedy Corner just for the F1 race.

This was the 4th victory in a row for Wyer's team, so far they had won 5 of the 6 races in the championship.

This event set a record for the fastest ever road race in history, and the record would be broken twice more in successive years at the same circuit; and the eventual record stood for decades.

== Official results ==
Pos	Class	No	Team	Drivers	Chassis	Engine	Laps
1	S 5.0	24	(United Kingdom) John Wyer Automotive Engineering	(Switzerland) Jo Siffert (United Kingdom) Brian Redman	Porsche 917K	Porsche 4.5L Flat-12	71
2	S 5.0	20	(Italy) SpA Ferrari SEFAC	(Belgium) Jacky Ickx (United Kingdom) John Surtees	Ferrari 512 S	Ferrari 5.0L V12	71
3	S 5.0	28	(Austria) Porsche Salzburg	(United Kingdom) Vic Elford (Germany) Kurt Ahrens Jr.	Porsche 917K	Porsche 4.5L Flat-12	70
4	S 5.0	22	(Italy) SpA Ferrari SEFAC	(Italy) Ignazio Giunti (Italy) Nino Vaccarella	Ferrari 512 S	Ferrari 5.0L V12	68
5	S 5.0	43	(Finland) Racing Team AAW	(Finland) Hans Laine (Netherlands) Gijs van Lennep	Porsche 917K	Porsche 4.5L Flat-12	68
6	S 5.0	29	(Austria) Porsche Salzburg	(United Kingdom) Richard Attwood (Germany) Hans Herrmann	Porsche 917K	Porsche 4.5L Flat-12	68
7	S 5.0	21	(Italy) SpA Ferrari SEFAC	(Switzerland) Peter Schetty (Italy) Arturo Merzario	Ferrari 512 S	Ferrari 5.0L V12	66
8	S 5.0	23	(Belgium) Ecurie Francorchamps	(United Kingdom) Derek Bell (Belgium) Hughes de Fierlant	Ferrari 512 S	Ferrari 5.0L V12	64
9	P 3.0	6	(Germany) Martini International Racing	(France) Gérard Larrousse (Austria) Rudi Lins	Porsche 908/02	Porsche 3.0L Flat-8	64
10	S 5.0	33	(Sweden) Ecurie Bonnier	(Sweden) Jo Bonnier (Sweden) Reine Wisell	Lola T70 Mk.3B	Chevrolet 5.0L V8	63
11	P 3.0	5	(Germany) Martini International Racing	(Germany) Hans-Dieter Dechent (Austria) Helmut Marko	Porsche 908/02	Porsche 3.0L Flat-8	62
12	S 2.0	31	(United Kingdom) John L'Amie	(United Kingdom) John L'Amie (United Kingdom) Brian Nelson	Porsche 910	Porsche 1.9L Flat-6	59
13	P 2.0	15	(Germany) Hans-Dieter Blatzheim	(Germany) Hans-Dieter Blatzheim (Germany) Ernst Kraus	Porsche 907	Porsche 1.9L Flat-6	59
14	S 2.0	32	(United Kingdom) Paul Vestey	(United Kingdom) Peter Sadler (United Kingdom) Paul Vestey	Porsche 910	Porsche 1.9L Flat-6	56
15	P 2.0	14	(Belgium) Levi's International Racing	(Belgium) Yves Deprez (Belgium) Julien Vernaeve	Chevron B16	Mazda 1.0L 2-Rotor	55
16	GT +2.0	59	(Switzerland) Bernard Cheneviére	(Switzerland) Bernard Cheneviére (Switzerland) Claude Haldi	Porsche 911S	Porsche 2.2L Flat-6	55
17	S 5.0	30	(Germany) Gesipa Racing Team	(Germany) Helmut Kelleners (Germany) Jürgen Neuhaus	Porsche 917K	Porsche 4.5L Flat-12	54
18	GT +2.0	53	(Germany) Kremer Racing	(Germany) Erwin Kremer (Germany) Karl von Wendt	Porsche 911S	Porsche 2.2L Flat-6	54
19	GT; 2.0	95	(France) Jean-Marie Jacquemin	(France) Jean-Marie Jacquemin (France) Bernard Palayer	Alpine A110/1300S	Renault 1.3L I4	52
20	GT; 2.0	52	(Belgium) Jean-Pierre Gaban	(Belgium) G. van Butsel (Belgium) Robert Moerenhout	Porsche 911S	Porsche 2.0L Flat-6	52
21	GT; 2.0	60	(Switzerland) Georges Duvingeaud	(Switzerland) Georges Duvigneaud (Switzerland) Camille Demoulin	Porsche 911S	Porsche 2.0L Flat-6	50
22	P 3.0	37	(United Kingdom) Tony Goodwin	(United Kingdom) Tony Goodwin (United Kingdom) Peter Taggart	Chevron B6/8	BMW 1.9L I4	48

=== Not classified ===
Class	No	Team	Drivers	Chassis	Engine	Laps
GT; 2.0	58	(Switzerland) Andre Wicky Racing Team	(France) Sylvain Garant (Italy) Mario Ilotte	Porsche 911S	Porsche 2.0L Flat-6	41

=== Did not finish ===
Class	No	Team	Drivers	Chassis	Engine	Laps	Reason
S 5.0	25	(United Kingdom) John Wyer Automotive Engineering	(Mexico) Pedro Rodríguez (Finland) Leo Kinnunen	Porsche 917K	Porsche 4.5L Flat-12	44	Gearbox oil pipe
S 2.0	40	(United Kingdom) Worcestershire Racing Association	(United Kingdom) James Tangye (United Kingdom) Paul Ridgway	Chevron B8	BMW 1.9L I4	40	Oil pressure
P 2.0	10	(United Kingdom) Philips Autoradio Racing	(United Kingdom) Guy Edwards (Germany) Roger Enever	Astra RNR2	Ford 1.6L I4	37	Engine mountings
GT; 2.0	51	(Belgium) Jean-Pierre Gaban	(Belgium) Jean-Pierre Gaban (Belgium) Willy Braillard	Porsche 911S	Porsche 2.0L Flat-6	33	DNF
S 5.0	35	(Belgium) Racing Team VDS	(Belgium) Teddy Pilette (Belgium) Gustave Gosselin	Lola T70 Mk.3B	Chevrolet 5.0L V8	31	Puncture/Suspension
S 2.0	39	(United Kingdom) Intertech Steering Wheels	(United Kingdom) Angus Clydesdale (United Kingdom) John Markey	Chevron B8	BMW 1.9L I4	22	Oil and water leak
S 2.0	38	(United Kingdom) Martin Blackie	(United Kingdom) Martin Blackie (United Kingdom) Peter Humble	Chevron B8	BMW 1.9L I4	18	Overheating
GT +2.0	54	(Switzerland) Jacques Rey	(Switzerland) Jacques Rey (Switzerland) Edgar Berney	Porsche 911S	Porsche 2.2L Flat-6	12	Engine
P 2.0	12	(United Kingdom) Stanley Robinson	(United Kingdom) Stanley Robinson (United Kingdom) John Blanckley	Unipower GT	BMC 2.0L I4	10	DNF
S 2.0	41	(United Kingdom) Worcestershire Racing Association	(United Kingdom) John Bamford (United Kingdom) Peter Creasey	Chevron B8	BMW 1.9L I4	10	Oil pump
P 3.0	7	(United Kingdom) Keith Grant	(United Kingdom) Keith Grant (United Kingdom) Gerry Marshall	Brabham BT8	Climax 2.7L V8	4	Electrical
S 5.0	35	(Switzerland) Racing Team VDS	(Switzerland) Gérard Pillon (Switzerland) Louis Morand	Lola T70 Mk.3B	Chevrolet 5.0L V8	2	DSQ (outside assistance)

== Statistics ==
- Pole position: #25 John Wyer Automotive Engineering Porsche 917K (Pedro Rodriguez) - 3:19.8 (157.861 mph/254.054 km/h)
- Fastest lap: #25 John Wyer Automotive Engineering Porsche 917K (Pedro Rodriguez)- 3:16.5 (160.513 mph/258.321 km/h)
- Time taken for winning car to cover scheduled distance: 4 hours, 9 minutes and 47.8 seconds
- Average Speed: 240.46 km/h (149.419 mph)
- Weather conditions: Cloudy, wet at start; later drying

World Sportscar Championship
Previous race: Targa Florio	1970 season	Next race: 1000km of Nürburgring
