= 1970 Targa Florio =

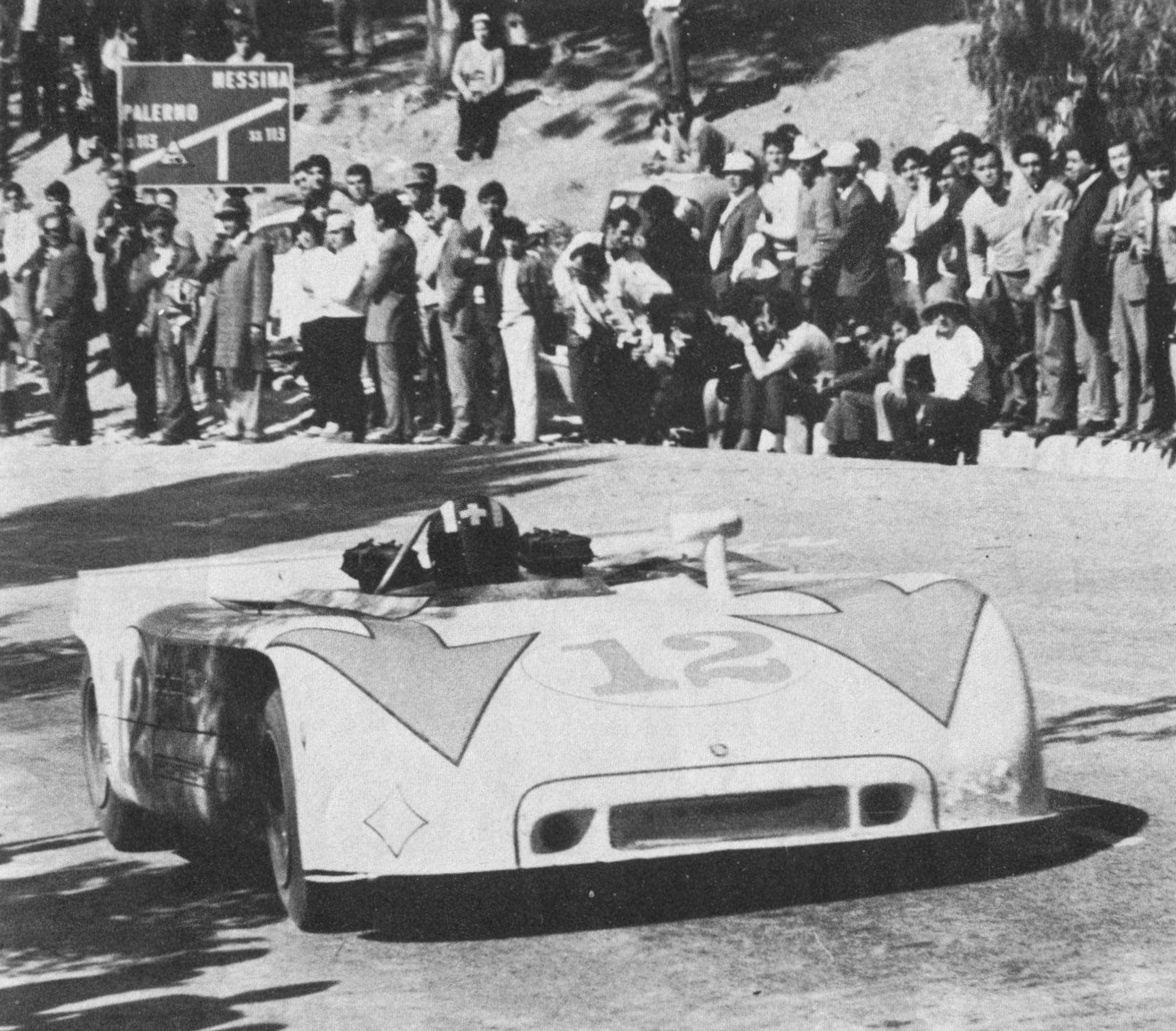
The winning Porsche 908/03 #12

The 1970 Targa Florio was an endurance race that took place on 3 May 1970. It was held on a 44.6 mi (71.8 km) anti-clockwise circuit made up entirely of public roads on the mountainous Italian island of Sicily. It was the fifth round of the 1970 International Championship for Makes.

== Pre-race ==
The Targa Florio was in 1970 the oldest motor race in the world, even older than the Isle of Man TT and the Indianapolis 500. First run in 1906, it was run on narrow public mountain roads that went up and down, and twisted and turned around the Sicilian countryside. The race was run on a number of variants over the years- from 1932 to 1936 and 1951 to 1977 it was run on the 45 mile Piccolo (Italian for small) course- by far the longest circuit on the 1970 World Sportscar Championship calendar. It was one of, if not the last of the genuine road races still run in the world. The previous courses were 67 and 92 miles long; and there were 680 mile Island tour versions run in the early 1910s and the late 1940s. The Piccolo course went through 4 to 5 towns in the island of Sicily. The circuit was extremely demanding and very difficult to learn- over the 45 mile course, there were between 800 and 900 corners- 16 to 20 corners for every mile, and the circuit had about 2,000 feet of elevation change- twice that of the Nurburgring. There was also a number of straights joined by a number of fast corners at the top of the circuit that measured out to about 6 miles- but the circuit was so twisty and had so many corners, average speeds never went past even 80 mph (128 km/h)- which in racing terms is very slow. The circuit was also very dangerous- although the roads and streets were closed off to the public for the race (but not for practice and test sessions- this caused all sorts of problems) the circuit was identical to every day civilian use, so it had no safety features of any kind and a crash often meant tumbling down a mountain slope or when in a town, crashing into a stone building, trees, and even groups of spectators. Although the Targa was a race where over its history very few people died in comparison to other races like the Mille Miglia and the Carrera Panamericana, it was still a risky affair.

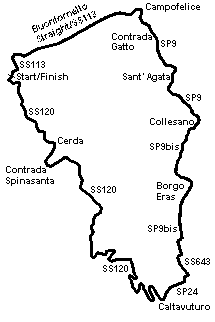
The Piccolo Targa Florio circuit in 1970

The Targa Florio, was unusual in that it was a time trial race against the clock as opposed to a race for physical position. Like most races that take place on extremely long courses such as the Isle of Man TT, the Mille Miglia and some other Italian public road races, each car was started one at a time on the road at timed intervals, much like how a rally-type race is started instead of the cars starting alongside each other, which is almost always the case in general circuit racing and on every other race on the sportscar championship calendar in 1970. So, for example, Car A would be started at 10 minutes before Car B. Once Car B starts and as more race distance would be covered, if Car B was then 9 minutes behind Car A on the road, then Car B would actually be 1 minute in front of Car A. So it was really a driving challenge to see what car could cover the 11-lap distance the quickest- this is almost identical to how a rally works; the Madonie Piccolo course used roads that would be suited for a rally. Most drivers only knew what their position was every 35–50 minutes, and that was when they reached the start-finish line in the town of Cerda; or in more organized team's cases, in another town or on some part of the isolated section of the track, where members of teams would wait for their team's car to come by and they would show pitboards showing their position and how much time their opponents are in front or behind them, which was sometimes out of date; communication in those days was very limited (compared to now).

For this event, Porsche introduced their new car, the light and nimble 908/03, which was better suited to the twisty and demanding circuit than the big and powerful 917 (although Vic Elford managed to post the fifth fastest overall time with a spare 917K on Friday practice, he was so physically exhausted after doing this he had to be removed from the car). Porsche motorsports chief Ferdinand Piëch (a grandson of founder Ferdinand Porsche) and his team brought 4 908/03's to the island; 3 were given to John Wyer and his factory-supported team and 1 was run as an official works car. The 908/03, unlike the 917K, was of exclusive use for the factory teams.

Race distance was lengthened to 11 laps from 10 in previous years, to comply with championship regulations and so the race would last at least six hours.

Pole position went to the Wyer 908/03 of Jo Siffert/Brian Redman, followed by the official works 908/03 of Vic Elford/Hans Herrmann, the sole works Ferrari 512S of Sicilian Nino Vaccarella/Ignazio Giunti, a works Alfa Romeo T33/3 of Piers Courage/Andrea De Adamich and then another Wyer 908/03 of Leo Kinnunen/Pedro Rodriguez .

The 908/03's had a 3-liter Flat-8 engine; so they were entered in the 3-liter prototype class; as opposed to the big-engined Flat-12 917's and V12 Ferrari 512's which were competing in the 5-liter sportscar class.

There were 12 different classes of racing- more than any other race on the calendar.

== Race ==
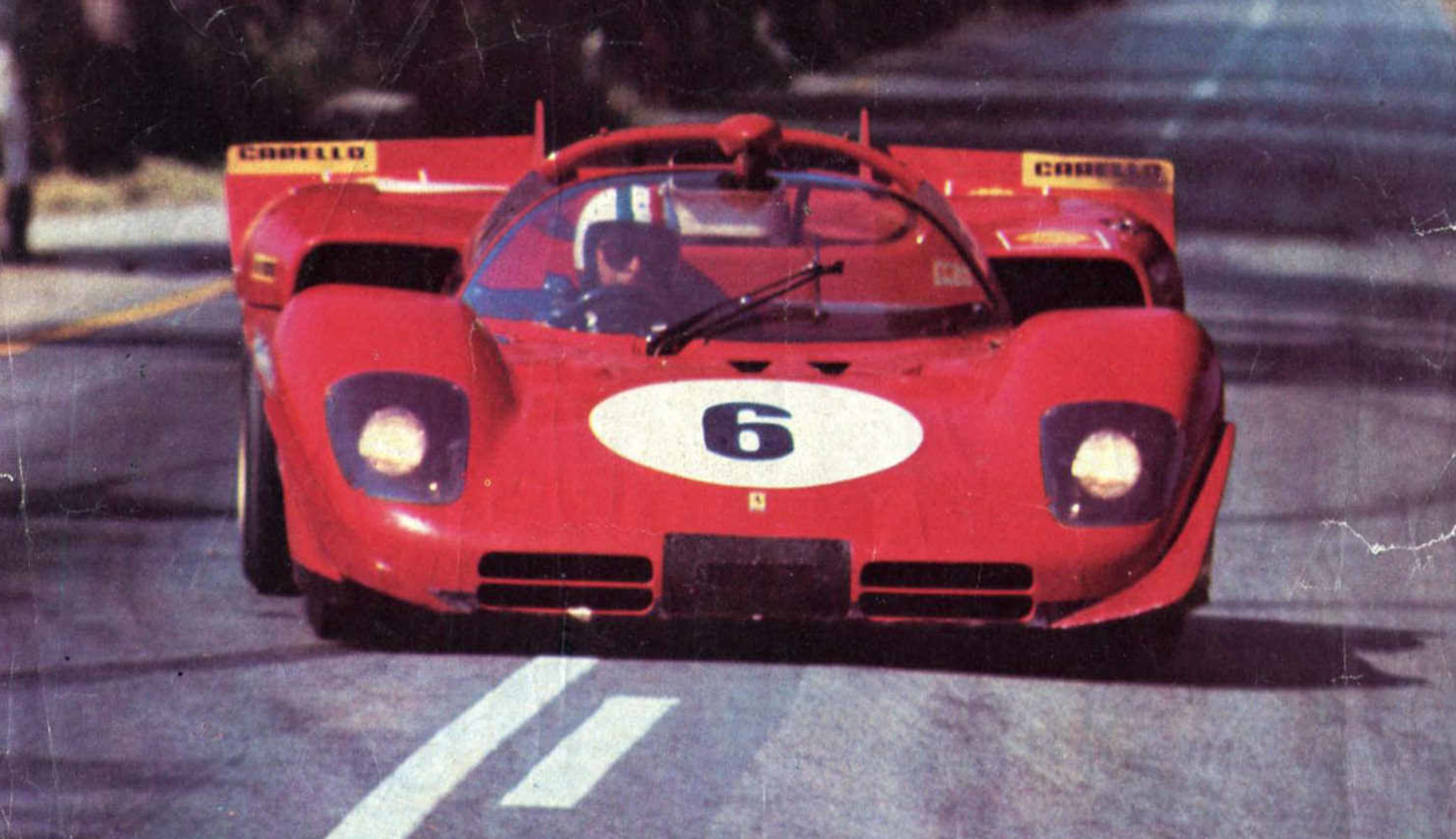
The Ferrari 512S #6 closed in 3rd place

The turnout for the race exceeded 400,000 people; the large amount of area the circuit covered helped to spread people out.

The cars each left the start in numerical order, so the 5-litre cars left first- Herbert Muller in the #4 Fillipinetti Ferrari 512S left first, then Vaccarella in the works #6 512S. Then the 3-litre cars left next- first Siffert in the #12 908/03, then Hezemans in the #14 works Alfa Romeo T33/3, then Van Lennep in the #18 908/02, then Elford in the #20 908/03 (which crashed on the first lap), then Maglioli in the #36 works Alfa T33/3, then Waldegard in the #36 908/03 and finally Kinnunen in the #40 908/03. Rodriguez was ill on raceday, so his co-driver, ex-rally driver Kinnunen took over as #1 and, in the rally-type event, sprinted into the lead. Once the car was handed off to Rodriguez, he lost the lead to Vaccarella in the lone works Ferrari. While out on the course, Redman caught up to Vaccarella, and attempted to pass him. Vaccarella blocked Redman and in doing so, nearly ran him off the road. This happened multiple times, and knowing Vaccarella knew the course extremely well, Redman decided to stay behind the Sicilian, cleverly deciding to wait for the next pit stop, knowing that the Wyer team was better at pitstops than Ferrari. And sure enough, when he came in after his 3-lap stint on the end of the 6th lap, he handed the car off to Siffert, and the Wyer team's pitwork was quick enough that Siffert got past the Ferrari while it was still in the pits, and Siffert sprinted off and went into the lead on the 7th lap.

Once Kinnunen was back in, he set the fastest ever lap of the Circuito Piccolo delle Madonie circuit- 33 minutes, 36.0 seconds on the last lap; and he managed to climb to and finish second to the Siffert/Redman car. There was some consolation for the Italian fans- homeland hero Nino Vaccarella in the sole works Ferrari 512 finished 3rd, the works Alfa of Courage/De Adamich crashed on the 8th lap and Elford also crashed the official works 908/03 on the first lap.

This was the 10th time a Porsche had won the Targa outright, a Porsche's first victory was in 1956. A final victory would come in 1973, when a Porsche 911 won outright. Porsche, on a track generally suited to their general design philosophy, hold the record for most victories at the Targa, a race which dated back to 1906.

== Official results ==
Pos	Class	No	Team	Drivers	Chassis	Engine	Laps
1	P 3.0	12	(United Kingdom) John Wyer Automotive Engineering	(Switzerland) Jo Siffert (United Kingdom) Brian Redman	Porsche 908/03	Porsche 3.0L Flat-8	11
2	P 3.0	40	(United Kingdom) John Wyer Automotive Engineering	(Finland) Leo Kinnunen (Mexico) Pedro Rodríguez	Porsche 908/03	Porsche 3.0L Flat-8	11
3	S 5.0	6	(Italy) SpA Ferrari SEFAC	(Italy) Nino Vaccarella (Italy) Ignazio Giunti	Ferrari 512S	Ferrari 5.0L V12	11
4	P 3.0	18	(Finland) Racing Team AAW	(Netherlands) Gijs van Lennep (Finland) Hans Laine	Porsche 908/02	Porsche 3.0L Flat-8	11
5	P 3.0	36	(United Kingdom) John Wyer Automotive Engineering	(Sweden) Björn Waldegård (United Kingdom) Richard Attwood	Porsche 908/03	Porsche 3.0L Flat-8	11
6	S 5.0	4	(Switzerland) Scuderia Filipinetti	(Switzerland) Herbert Müller (United Kingdom) Mike Parkes	Ferrari 512S	Ferrari 5.0L V12	10
7	P 2.0	56	(Italy) Scuderia Madunina	(United Kingdom) Jonathan Williams (Italy) Giovanni Alberti	Alfa Romeo T33/2	Alfa Romeo 2.0L V8	10
8	S 2.0	94	(Italy) Scuderia Brescia Corse	(Italy) "Pam" (Italy) "Gibi"	Abarth 2000S	Abarth 2.0L I4	10
9	GT; 1.6	174	(Italy) HF Squadra Corse	(Italy) Sandro Munari (Italy) Claudio Maglioli	Lancia Fulvia HF	Lancia 1.6L V4	10
10	S 2.0	98	(Italy) Etna	(Italy) Giuseppe Virgilio (Italy) Luigi Taramazzo	Abarth 2000S	Abarth 2.0L I4	10
11	P 2.0	58	(Italy) Pegaso	(Italy) Pietro Lo Piccolo (Italy) Salvatore Calascibetta	Ferrari Dino 206S Spyder	Ferrari 2.0L V6	10
12	P 2.0	60	(Italy) Antonio Nicodemi	(Italy) Antonio Nicodemi (Italy) Gianpiero Moretti	Porsche 907	Porsche 1.9L Flat-6	10
13	P 3.0	26	(Germany) Martini International	(France) Gérard Larrousse (Austria) Rudi Lins	Porsche 908/02	Porsche 3.0L Flat-8	9
14	GT; 2.0	140	(Italy) Liber Marchiolo	(Italy) Liber Marchiolo (Italy) Antonio de Castro	Porsche 911S	Porsche 2.0L Flat-6	9
15	GT; 2.0	138	(United Kingdom) David Weir	(United Kingdom) Alain de Cadenet (United Kingdom) Mike Ogier	Porsche 911S	Porsche 2.0L Flat-6	9
16	P 1.0	262	(Italy) Nord-Oest	(Italy) Pier Giorgio Pellegrin (Italy) Renzo Ruspa	Fiat-Abarth 1000SP	Abarth 1.0L I4	9
17	GT; 2.0	120	(Switzerland) Andre Wicky Racing Team	(France) Sylvain Garant (Switzerland) Bernard Cheneviére	Porsche 911S	Porsche 2.0L Flat-6	9
18	GT; 1.6	190	(Italy) Jolly Club	(Italy) Raffaele Restivo (Italy) Alfonso Merendino	Lancia Fulvia HF Zagato	Lancia 1.6L V4	9
19	P 1.0	260	(Italy) Scuderia Brescia Corse	(Italy) Ugo Locatelli (Italy) Paolo Gargano	AMS SP	Ford 1.0L I4	9
20	GT; 1.3	278	(Italy) Romano Ramoino	(Italy) Giuseppe Gaicomini (Italy) Romano Ramoino	Alpine A110	Renault 1.3L I4	9
21	GT; 1.3	286	(Italy) Scuderia Brescia Corse	(Italy) Giovanni Arcovito (Italy) Angelo Rizzo	Lancia Fulvia HF	Lancia 1.3L V4	9
22	GT; 1.6	172	(Italy) Monzeglio	(Italy) Gianpaolo Benedini (Italy) Cesare Poretti	Alfa Romeo GTA	Alfa Romeo 1.6L I4	9
23	GT; 1.6	178	(Italy) Giancarlo Galimberti	(Italy) Giancarlo Galimberti (Italy) Domenico Cedrati	Lancia Fulvia HF	Lancia 1.6L V4	9
24	S 1.6	154	(Italy) Pasquale de Francisci	(Italy) Pasquale de Francisci (Italy) Settimino Balistreri	Alfa Romeo Giulia TZ	Alfa Romeo 1.6 I4	9
25	P 1.3	218	(Italy) Monzeglio	(Italy) Maurizio Zanetti (Italy) Giorgio Pianta	AMS	Alfa Romeo 1.3L I4	8
26	P 1.3	214	(Italy) Aretusa	(Italy) Matteo Scarlata (Italy) Giuseppe Marotta	Lancia Fulvia TS	Lancia 1.3L V4	8
27	S 1.6	152	(Italy) Nissena	(Italy) Carmelo Guigno (Italy) Salvatore Sutera	Alfa Romeo Giulia TZ	Alfa Romeo 1.6 I4	8
28	GT +2.0	82	(France) Patrice Sanson	(France) Patrice Sanson (France) J. Claude Peramone	Porsche 911S	Porsche 2.2L Flat-6	8
29	GT; 2.0	136		(Switzerland) Jean Selz (Switzerland) Pierre Greub	Porsche 911S	Porsche 2.0L Flat-6	8
30	S 1.6	162	(Italy) Nissena	(Italy) Antonio Ferraro (Italy) Giuseppe Valenza	Alfa Romeo Giulia Spider	Alfa Romeo 1.6 I4	8
31	GT; 1.3	274	(Italy) Jolly Club	(Italy) Franco Lisitano (Italy) "Zerimar"	Lancia Fulvia HF	Lancia 1.3L V4	8
32	GT; 1.6	184	(Italy) Scuderia Pegaso	(Italy) Giulio Pucci (Italy) Vincenzo Mirto Randazzo	Alfa Romeo GTA	Alfa Romeo 1.6L V4	8
33	GT; 2.0	142		(Italy) Fiorenzo Genta (Italy) Piero Monticone	Porsche 911S	Porsche 2.0L Flat-6	8
34	S 1.3	236	(Italy) Scuderia Pegaso	(Italy) "Black & White" (Italy) Guido Garufi	Abarth 1300 OT	Abarth 1.3L I4	8
35	P 2.0	64	(Italy) Scuderia Pescara	(Italy) Turillo Barbuscia (Italy) Leandro Terra	Ferrari Dino 206S	Ferrari 2.0L V6	8
36	GT; 2.0	112	(Italy) Franco Berruto	(Italy) Franco Berruto (Italy) Michele Licheri	Porsche 911S	Porsche 2.0L Flat-6	8
37	GT; 1.3	292	(Italy) Scuderia Pegaso	(Italy) Sergio Mantia (Italy) Gaetano Lo Jacono	Lancia Fulvia HF	Lancia 1.3L V4	8
38	S 2.0	96	(Italy) Etna	(Italy) Alfio Nicolosi (Italy) Angelo Bonaccorsi	Porsche 910	Porsche 1.9L Flat-6	8
39	P 3.0	44	(United Kingdom) John Chatham	(United Kingdom) John Chatham (United Kingdom) Alan Harvey	MGC	BMC 3.0L I6	8
40	GT; 1.3	282	(Italy) Jolly Club	(Italy) Cristiano Rattazzi (Italy) Pasquale Anastasio	Lancia Fulvia HF	Lancia 1.3L V4	8
41	P 3.0	28	(Italy) Autodelta SpA	(United Kingdom) Piers Courage (Italy) Andrea de Adamich	Alfa Romeo T33/3	Alfa Romeo 3.0L V8	7
42	S 2.0	90	(Italy) Scuderia Pegaso	(Italy) Ferdinando Latteri (Italy) Nino Todaro	Porsche 906	Porsche 1.9L Flat-6	7
43	GT; 1.6	200	(Italy) HF Squadra Corse	(Italy) Amilcare Ballestrieri (Italy) Raffaele Pinto	Lancia Fulvia HF	Lancia 1.6L V4	7
44	GT +2.0	86	(Switzerland) Porsche Club Romand	(Switzerland) Claude Haldi (Switzerland) "Mirage"	Porsche 911S	Porsche 2.2L Flat-6	7
45	GT; 1.6	62	(United Kingdom) Ed Negus	(United Kingdom) Edward Negus (United Kingdom) Peter Hanson	Chevron B16	Ford 1.6L I4	7
46	GT; 1.6	200	(Italy) Sport Trid	(Italy) Salvatore Cucinotta (Italy) Domenico Patti	Lancia Fulvia HF	Lancia 1.6L V4	7
47	GT; 1.6	194	(Italy) Franco Sebastiani	(Italy) Stefano Sebastiani (Italy) Roberto Nardini	Lotus Europa	Renault 1.6L I4	7
48	P 1.0	252	(Italy) Mario Spataro	(Italy) Mario Spataro (Italy) Claudio Bruschi	Osca S1000	Maserati 1.0L I4	7
49	GT; 2.0	122	(Italy) Scuderia Brescia Corse	(Italy) Giuseppe Schenetti (Italy) Sergio Zerbini	Porsche 911S	Porsche 2.0L Flat-6	7

=== Did Not Finish ===
Class	No	Team	Drivers	Chassis	Engine	Laps	Reasons
S 1.6	160	(Italy) Silvestre Semilia	(Italy) Silvestre Semilia (Italy) Giuseppe Crescenti	Alfa Romeo Giulia Spider	Alfa Romeo 1.6 I4	6	Gearbox
GT; 1.6	186	(Italy) Luigi Rinaldi	(Italy) Luigi Rinaldi (Italy) Mario Radicella	Alfa Romeo GTA	Alfa Romeo 1.6 I4	6	DNF
P 3.0	14	(Italy) Autodelta SpA	(Netherlands) Toine Hezemans (United States) Masten Gregory	Alfa Romeo T33/3	Alfa Romeo 3.0L V8	5	Accident
P 2.0	52	(Italy) Etna	(Italy) "Peter von Serzawa" (Italy) Santo Scigliano	Fiat 124 Spider	Fiat 2.0L I4	5	DNF
GT; 1.6	188	(Italy) Etna	(Italy) Checco D'Angelo (Italy) "Jimmy"	Alfa Romeo GTA	Alfa Romeo 1.6L I4	5	DSQ
GT; 1.3	288	(Germany) V10 Kleber	(Germany) Ferdi Bökmann (Germany) Hans E. Böhm	Simca 1300	Simca 1.3L I4	5	DNF
GT; 2.0	128		(Italy) Ignazio Capuano (Italy) Giancarlo Barba	Porsche 911S	Porsche 2.0L Flat-6	4	DNF
GT; 1.6	180	(Italy) Scuderia Pegaso	(Italy) Paolo de Luca (Italy) Giuseppe Vassallo	Alfa Romeo GTA	Alfa Romeo 1.6L I4	4	DNF
S 1.6	156	(Italy) Scuderia Pegaso	(Italy) Salvatore Barraco (Italy) "Amphicar"	Alfa Romeo Giulia TZ	Alfa Romeo 1.6L I4	3	DNF
S 1.6	156	(Italy) Etna	(Italy) Giuseppe D'Amico (Italy) Girolamo Perniciaro	Alfa Romeo Giulia TZ	Alfa Romeo 1.6L I4	3	DNF
GT; 1.6	192	(Italy) Scuderia Pegaso	(Italy) Giovanni Dell'Olio (Italy) Vincenzo Virgilio	Alfa Romeo GTA	Alfa Romeo 1.6L I4	3	Mechanical
GT; 1.6	198	(Italy) Salvatore Gagliano	(Italy) Salvatore Gagliano (Italy) Alfonso di Garbo	Alfa Romeo GTA	Alfa Romeo 1.6L I4	3	DNF
GT; 1.6	204	(Italy) Gianluigi Verna	(Italy) Francesco Cosentino (Italy) Gianluigi Verna	Alfa Romeo GTA	Alfa Romeo 1.6L I4	3	Accident
P 1.0	254	(Italy) Romano Martini	(Italy) Francesco Patané (Italy) "Oras"	Fiat-Abarth 1000SP	Abarth 1.0L I4	3	DNF
GT; 1.6	264	(Italy) Romano Martini	(Italy) Romano Martini (Italy) Alessandro Federico	ATS 1000 SP	Ford 1.0L I4	3	DNF
P 3.0	38	(Italy) Abarth-Osella	(Italy) Arturo Merzario (Austria) Johannes Ortner	Abarth 3000SP	Abarth 3.0L V8	2	Gearbox
P 1.0	256	(Italy) Scuderia Brescia Corse	(Italy) Luigi Moreschi (Italy) "Patrizia"	AMS SP	Ford 1.0L I4	2	DNF
P 1.0	266	(Italy) "Gero"	(Italy) "Gero" (Italy) "Roger"	De Sanctis	Ford 1.0L I4	2	Starter motor
GT; 1.6	276	(Italy) Scuderia Pegaso	(Italy) Antonio Catalano (Italy) Marco de Bartoli	Lancia Fulvia HF	Lancia 1.6L V4	2	DNF
GT; 2.0	124	(Italy) Giampaolo Baruffi	(Italy) Giancarlo Sala (Italy) Giampaolo Baruffi	Porsche 911	Porsche 2.0L Flat-6	1	Mechanical
GT; 1.6	196	(Italy) Giovanni Rizzo	(Italy) Giovanni Rizzo (Italy) Stefano Alongi	Alfa Romeo GTA	Alfa Romeo 1.6L I4	1	Suspension
S 1.3	232	(Italy) Aldo Bersano	(Italy) Aldo Bersano (Belgium) William Scheeren	Abarth 1300S	Abarth 1.3L I4	1	Mechanical
GT; 1.3	272	(Italy) Jolly Club	(Italy) Antonio Trenti (Italy) Alberto Fasce	Lancia Fulvia HF	Lancia 1.6L V4	1	Off course
P 3.0	20	(Germany) Porsche System	(United Kingdom) Vic Elford (Germany) Hans Herrmann	Porsche 908/03	Porsche 3.0L Flat-8	0	Accident
P 3.0	32	(Italy) Autodelta SpA	(Italy) Umberto Maglioli (Italy) Nanni Galli	Alfa Romeo T33/3	Alfa Romeo 3.0L V8	0	Accident
GT; 1.6	204	(Italy) Antonio Guagliardo	(Italy) Antonio La Luce (Italy) Antonio Guagliardo	Abarth 2000S	Alfa Romeo 1.6L I4	0	Mechanical
P 1.3	220	(United Kingdom) Jack Wheeler	(United Kingdom) Jack Wheeler (United Kingdom) Martin Davidson	Jerboa SP	BMC 1.3L I4	0	Accident
S 1.3	234	(Italy) Settecolli	(Italy) Enzo Buzzetti (Italy) Gianni Marini	Abarth 1300S	Abarth 1.6L I4	0	Mechanical
GT; 1.3	280	(Italy) Scuderia Pegaso	(Italy) Giuseppe Chiaramonte (Italy) Giuseppe Spatafora	Lancia Fulvia HF	Lancia 1.6L V4	0	Mechanical

== Statistics ==
- Pole position: #12 John Wyer Automotive Engineering Porsche 908/03 (Jo Siffert/Brian Redman) - 34:10.0 (78.321 mph/126.087 km/h)
- Fastest lap: #40 John Wyer Automotive Engineering Porsche 908/03 (Leo Kinnunen)- 33:36.0 (79.890 mph/128.571 km/h)
- Distance covered by cars on leading lap: 789.8 km
- Time taken for winning car to cover distance: 6 hours, 35 minutes and 30 seconds
- Average Speed: 120.152 km/h (74.659 mph)
- Weather conditions: Sunny, dry, clear skies

World Sportscar Championship
Previous race: 1000km of Monza	1970 season	Next race: 1000km of Spa
