= 1970 12 Hours of Sebring =

Sports car endurance race

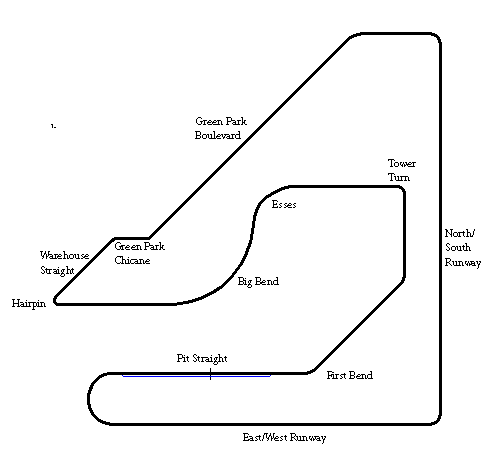
Sebring International Raceway in 1970

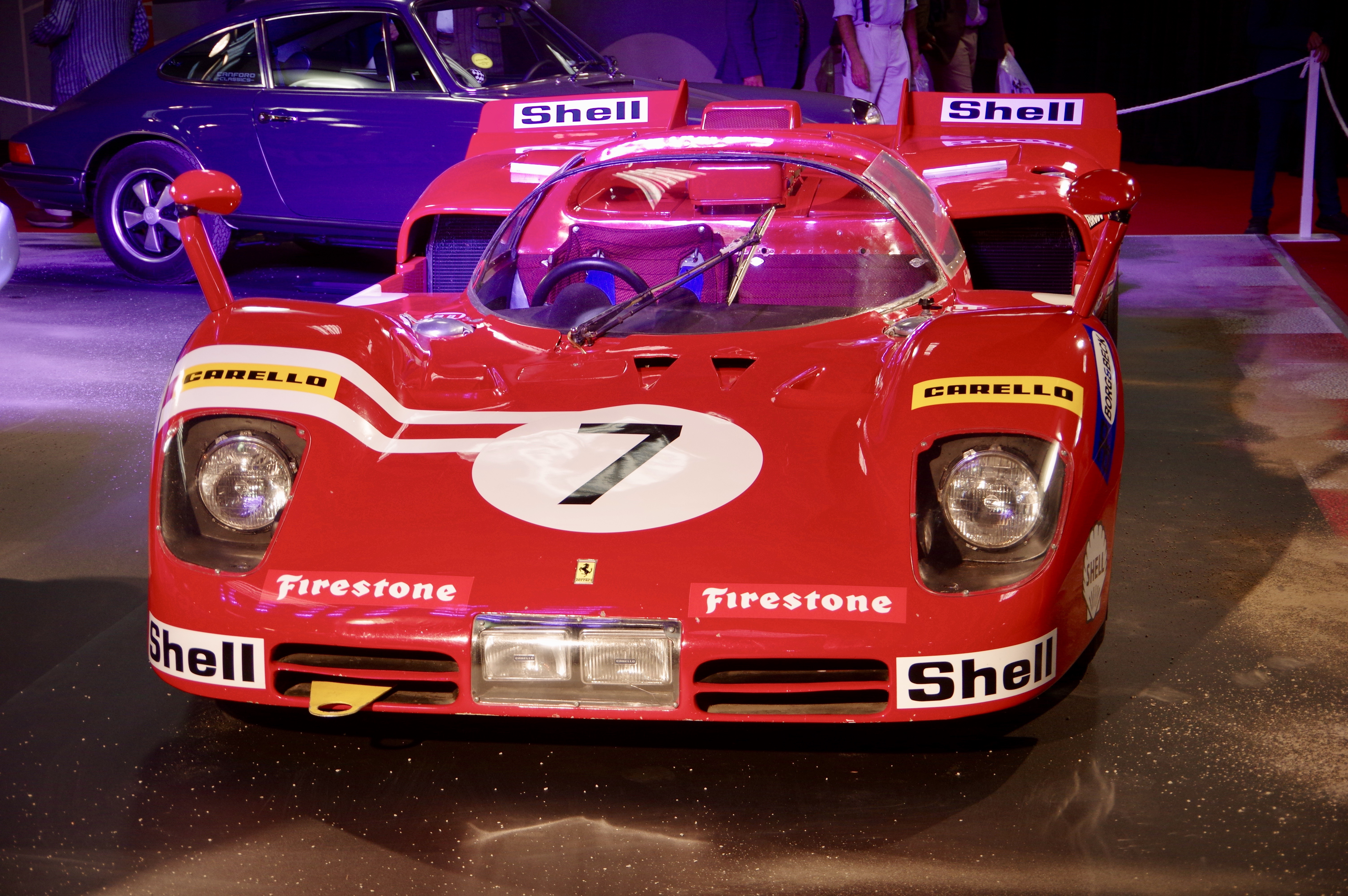
Ferrari 512 S

The 1970 12 Hours of Sebring was an endurance race held at the 5.2 mile (8.3 km) Sebring International Raceway, Sebring, Florida, United States on March 21, 1970. It was the twentieth running of the endurance classic and the second round of the 1970 World Sportscar Championship season.

== Pre-race ==
With the 1969 to 1971 rules allowing sportscars with 5-litre-engines if at least 25 were made, which did Porsche early in 1969 with the Porsche 917 and Ferrari late in the year with the Ferrari 512S, up to 50 V12-powered race cars were available for the 1970 World Sportscar Championship endurance racing season, entered either by factory-backed teams, or by independent customers if they could find funding and pilots that could handle a 500+ hp car competitively for at least six hours, or up to 24h in some events.

John Wyer's Gulf-Porsche team had just come fresh off a 1-2 victory at the 1970 24 Hours of Daytona 7 weeks earlier. So far, Porsche was ahead in the championship against their only real rival, Ferrari. When the teams descended upon the isolated and very bumpy 5.2 mile Sebring airfield circuit in central Florida, qualifying was a mix of Ferraris and Porsches: American Mario Andretti qualified the #19 works Ferrari 512S Spyder on pole position at 121 mph at 2:33.5- 5 mph and 6.5 seconds faster than Chris Amon's time the year previous in a works 3-litre Ferrari 312P prototype and almost a second ahead of the #14 Jo Siffert/Brian Redman Gulf-Porsche 917K. Following them were the Porsche/Audi USA sponsored Porsche 917K driven by Vic Elford and Kurt Ahrens Jr., the #20 works Ferrari 512S Spyder of Jacky Ickx/Peter Schetty, the #15 Gulf-Porsche 917K of Pedro Rodríguez/Leo Kinnunen, and a NART-entered Ferrari 512S Spyder of Sam Posey/Ronnie Bucknum and the #21 works Ferrari 512S of Ignazio Giunti/Nino Vaccarella.

== Race ==
The 1970 running is considered by many to be the best 12 Hours of Sebring ever. This was the first 12 Hours of Sebring where the cars used a rolling start, a procedure similar to the start which is used at the Indianapolis 500, and has been used at every Sebring 12 Hours to this day. Before 1970, the drivers did a traditional Le Mans start, but the events of the 1969 Le Mans race in which English driver John Woolfe was killed driving his Porsche 917 after a crash in which he did not have his seatbelts fastened led the governing body to ban Le Mans starts on grounds of safety.

A group of 5-liter entries led away; Andretti led from pole position, followed by Siffert, Elford, Ickx, Rodriguez and the rest of the field, which included works Matra and Alfa Romeo prototypes, running in the 3-liter class. There was an accident between two Lolas- Bob Brown in the #26 car would continue, but Mike De Udy in the other Lola would retire after just one lap.

Ickx then moved ahead of Elford into 3rd, behind Siffert and Andretti, the former setting a fastest lap of 2:32.77 in an effort to catch Andretti, and he did for 2 laps- but Andretti regained it then lost it again when he pitted for fuel and a driver change. Other teams stopped for fuel and driver changes, as Andretti switched out with Merzario and Siffert with Redman. The #19's stop dropped it down to 5th, and moments later, Redman brought in the #14 car with electrical trouble. It was a lengthy pitstop, and the car dropped down the order. The order now was the #15 Porsche 917K of Rodriguez/Kinnunen, #16 Porsche 917K of Elford/Ahrens Jr, and the 3 works Ferraris. Near the 3rd hour, Rodriguez brought the leading car into the pits with a puncture. Although they were able to change the punctured tire and send Rodriguez out again, it was 4 laps behind the leading #19 Ferrari. The #16 car crashed and was out of the race with irreparable suspension damage. The Porsche 917K's problems allowed all three works Ferraris to lead the field into the night. And running in 5th place was a Solar Productions/Gulf sponsored #48 Porsche 908/02 of movie star and racer Steve McQueen (whose leg was in a cast) and Peter Revson, who was battling with the #33 works Alfa Romeo T33/3 of Toine Hezemans/Masten Gregory.

When night fell, the #20 Ickx/Schetty Ferrari went out after 151 laps with a blown head gasket, and the #21 Giunti/Vaccarella car was in the pits being repaired. Although the #19 Andretti/Merzario was still leading, and the #14 Redman/Kinnunen car, which had suffered newly designed front hub failures previously which caused it to drop out of contention, was out after 211 laps due to accident damage (Kinnunen and Siffert had switched cars; Siffert was now driving with Rodriguez). Then, Andretti brought the leading car in with gearbox problems. Although Merzario took the car back out again in the lead, the second-placed #15 Rodriguez/Siffert Porsche 917K was coming back after being 12 laps down for a while they were able to make up most of this deficit after the #19 Ferrari was in the pits. The Solar Productions Porsche 908/02 was in 3rd and the #21 Giunti/Vaccarella car was in 4th. And at 9:46 p.m. The #19 Ferrari was out of the race, which put the Rodriguez/Siffert Porsche 917K in the lead and the McQueen/Revson car was in 2nd.

With 30 minutes remaining, one car still running and desperate for an overall victory, Ferrari team manager Mauro Forghieri decided to replace Giunti with the faster and more experienced Andretti in the #21 car. Although the #21 car was a lap behind; Andretti went out, and pushed very hard; unlapped himself and was making up time quickly on Siffert and Revson. But then all of a sudden, Siffert brought the #15 Gulf-Porsche 917K into the pits with front hub failure, the same problems which had stricken its sister car. This long pitstop allowed the Solar Productions Porsche 908/02 to take 1st- but Andretti had managed to pass Revson and take the lead back. But all of a sudden Andretti brought the car back into the pits for fuel- and the McQueen/Revson Porsche took the lead once again. But Andretti was not about to give up so easily – with only 1 lap to go he stormed out of the pits and chased down Revson, and at the end of the 5.2-mile lap Andretti crossed the line first, with Revson second (who managed to score a 3-liter class win), Masten Gregory in the #33 Alfa was third and the #15 Gulf-Porsche was fourth. Of the 68 cars that started the race, the brutal Sebring circuit managed to whittle the field down to 28 cars.

== Official results ==
Pos	Class	No	Team	Drivers	Chassis	Engine	Laps
1	S 5.0	21	(Italy) SpA Ferrari SEFAC	(Italy) Ignazio Giunti (Italy) Nino Vaccarella (United States) Mario Andretti	Ferrari 512 S	Ferrari 5.0L V12	248
2	P 3.0	48	(United States) Solar Productions	(United States) Steve McQueen (United States) Peter Revson	Porsche 908/02	Porsche 3.0L Flat-8	248
3	P 3.0	33	(Italy) Autodelta SpA	(Netherlands) Toine Hezemans (United States) Masten Gregory	Alfa Romeo T33/3	Alfa Romeo 3.0L V8	247
4	S 5.0	15	(United Kingdom) J. W. Automotive Engineering	(Mexico) Pedro Rodriguez (Finland) Leo Kinnunen (Switzerland) Jo Siffert	Porsche 917K	Porsche 4.5L Flat-12	244
5	P 3.0	34	(France) Equipe Matra-Simca	(France) Henri Pescarolo (France) Johnny Servoz-Gavin	Matra-Simca MS650	Matra 3.0L V12	242
6	P 3.0	22	(United States) North American Racing Team (NART)	(United Kingdom) Mike Parkes (United States) Chuck Parsons	Ferrari 312 P Coupe	Ferrari 3.0L V12	240
7	P 3.0	46	(Germany) Martini International	(Germany) Gerhard Koch (France) Gérard Larrousse (United Kingdom) Richard Attwood	Porsche 908/02	Porsche 3.0L Flat-8	236
8	P 3.0	31	(Italy) Autodelta SpA	(United Kingdom) Piers Courage (Italy) Andrea de Adamich	Alfa Romeo T33/3	Alfa Romeo 3.0L V8	231
9	P 3.0	32	(Italy) Autodelta SpA	(Germany) Rolf Stommelen (Italy) Nanni Galli	Alfa Romeo T33/3	Alfa Romeo 3.0L V8	230
10	GT +5.0	1	(United States) Troy Promotions, Inc.	(United States) Tony DeLorenzo (United States) Dick Lang	Chevrolet Corvette	Chevrolet 7.0L V8	219
11	GT +5.0	3	(United States) Bob Johnson	(United States) Bob Johnson (United States) Robert R. Johnson (United States) Jim Greendyke	Chevrolet Corvette	Chevrolet 7.0L V8	214
12	P 3.0	35	(France) Equipe Matra-Simca	(United States) Dan Gurney (France) François Cevert	Matra-Simca MS650	Matra 3.0L V12	213
13	GT; 2.0	53	(United States) Brumos Porsche-Audi	(United States) Peter Gregg (United States) Pete Harrison	Porsche 911T	Porsche 2.0L Flat-6	205
14	T 5.0	40	(United States) Takondo Racing	(United States) Vince Gimondo (United States) Chuck Dietrich	Chevrolet Camaro	Chevrolet 5.0L V8	203
15	GT; 2.0	52	(Canada) Jacques Duval	(Canada) Jacques Duval (United States) Bob Bailey (Canada) George Nicolas	Porsche 911T	Porsche 2.0L Flat-6	201
16	T 5.0	39	(United States) Bob Mitchell	(United States) Bob Mitchell (United States) Charlie Kemp	Chevrolet Camaro	Chevrolet 5.0L V8	191
17	GT +5.0	9	(United States) Mamie Reynolds Gregory	(United States) Bob Grossman (United States) Don Yenko	Chevrolet Camaro	Chevrolet 7.0L V8	189
18	T 5.0	95	(United States) Bruce Behrens Racing	(United States) John Tremblay (United States) Bill McDill	Chevrolet Camaro	Chevrolet 5.0L V8	187
19	P 2.0	73	(United States) Ring Free Oil Racing	(United States) Janet Guthrie (Republic of Ireland) Rosemary Smith (United States) Judy Kondratiff	Austin-Healey Sprite	BMC 1.3L I4	187
20	GT +5.0	2	(United States) Troy-Promotions, Inc.	(United States) Jerry Thompson (United States) John Mahler	Chevrolet Corvette	Chevrolet 7.0L V8	187
21	T 5.0	91	(United States) Flem-Car Enterprises	(United States) Jim Corwin (United States) Donna Mae Mims	Chevrolet Camaro	Chevrolet 5.0L V8	184
22	T 5.0	92	(United States) Preston Hood	(United States) John Elliott (United States) Don Gwynne Jr.	Chevrolet Camaro	Chevrolet 5.0L V8	182
23	T 2.0	50	(United States) Nationwide Food Brokers	(United States) Mike Rahal (United States) Hugh Wise (United States) Werner Frank	Porsche 906	Porsche 1.9L Flat-6	181
24	T 5.0	37	(United States) Collins-Wilson Racing	(United States) Vincent P. Collins (United States) Larry Wilson	Ford Mustang	Ford 4.7L V8	175
25	GT; 2.0	57	(United States) Waldron Motors	(United States) John Belpreche (United States) Jim Gammon (United States) Ray Mummery	MGB	BMC 1.8L I4	175
26	GT; 2.0	58	(United States) Waldron Motors	(United States) Ben Scott (United States) Dave Houser (United States) Lowell Lanier	MGB	BMC 1.8L I4	169
27	T 5.0	18	(United States) Paul Pettey	(United States) Paul Pettey (United States) Roy Hallquist	Ford Mustang	Ford 4.7L V8	162
28	T 2.0	80	(United States) Texas Speed Museum	(United States) Rod Kennedy (United States) Mike Tillson (United States) Robert Samm	Lancia Fulvia HF	Lancia 1.3L V4	157
29 NC	P 2.0	54	(United States) Automobiles of Italy	(United States) Anatoly Artunoff (United States) Bill Pryor	Abarth 2000SP	Abarth 2.0L I4	166
30 NC	S 3.0	51	(United States) Porsche-Audi	(United States) Stephen Behr (United States) Merv Rosen	Porsche 906	Porsche 1.9L Flat-6	158
31 NC	S 3.0	63	(Mexico) Carlos Fabre	(Mexico) Carlos Fabre (Mexico) Pepe Aguilar	Chevron B8	BMW 1.9L I4	
32 NC	S 5.0	26	(United States) Randy's Auto Body Shop	(United States) Bobby Brown (United States) Gregg Young (The Bahamas) Robin Ormes	Lola T70 Mk.3B	Chevrolet 5.0L V8	114
33 NC	T 2.0	84	(United States) HCAS	(United States) Walter Brown (United States) Joe Marcus (United States) Jim R. Sandman	BMW 2002	BMW 2.0L I4	105

== Did Not Finish ==
Class	No	Team	Drivers	Chassis	Engine	Laps	Reason
P 3.0	47	(Finland) Racing Team AAW	(Finland) Hans Laine (Netherlands) Gijs van Lennep	Porsche 908/02	Porsche 3.0L Flat-8	229	Unknown
S 5.0	19	(Italy) SpA Ferrari SEFAC	(United States) Mario Andretti (Italy) Arturo Merzario	Ferrari 512 S Spyder	Ferrari 5.0L V12	227	Gearbox
S 5.0	14	(United Kingdom) John Wyer Automotive Engineering	(Switzerland) Jo Siffert (United Kingdom) Brian Redman (Finland) Leo Kinnunen	Porsche 917K	Porsche 4.5L Flat-12	211	Accident damage
GT +5.0	8	(United States) Or Costanzo	(United States) Dave Heinz (United States) Or Costanzo	Chevrolet Corvette	Chevrolet 7.0L V8	191	Unknown
GT +5.0	4	(United States) John Greenwood	(United States) John Greenwood (United States) Allan Barker	Chevrolet Corvette	Chevrolet 7.0L V8	159	Clutch
S 5.0	20	(Italy) SpA Ferrari SEFAC	(Belgium) Jacky Ickx (Switzerland) Peter Schetty	Ferrari 512 S Spyder	Ferrari 5.0L V12	151	Engine (Head gasket)
GT; 2.0	56	(United States) British Leyland Motors, Inc.	(United States) Jon Woodner (United States) Dan O'Connor	MG Midget	BMC 1.3L I4	122	Oil pressure
S 5.0	29	(United States) Auto Enterprises	(United States) Ray Heppenstall (United States) Francis C. Grant	Ford GT40 Mk.I	Ford 4.9L V8	117	Rear axle
S 5.0	24	(United States) North American Racing Team (NART)	(United States) Sam Posey (United States) Ronnie Bucknum (United States) Bert Everett	Ferrari 512 S Spyder	Ferrari 5.0L V12	92	Fuel pump
GT; 2.0	55	(United States) British Leyland Motors, Inc.	(United States) Merle Brennan (United States) Logan Brennan	MG Midget	BMC 1.3L I4	84	Oil line
GT +2.0	82	(United States) General Plastics	(United States) Robert Clark (United States) Wayne Marsula	Lancia Fulvia HF	Lancia 2.0L V4	78	Engine (valve)
GT; 2.0	77	(United States) Jennings/Keyser	(United States) Bruce Jennings (United States) Bob Tullius	Porsche 911T	Porsche 2.0L Flat-6	78	Engine
GT; 2.0	69	(United States) Harry Theodoracopoulos	(United States) Paul Spruell (United States) Wilbur Pickett	Alfa Romeo Giulia Spider	Alfa Romeo 1.75L I4	75	Electrical
P 2.0	61	(United States) Ring Free Oil Racing	(United States) Jim Baker (United Kingdom) Clive Baker	Chevron B16	Ford-Cosworth FVC 1.8L I4	70	Engine (crankshaft)
S 5.0	16	Porsche-Audi United States	(United Kingdom) Vic Elford (Germany) Kurt Ahrens Jr.	Porsche 917K	Porsche 4.5L Flat-12	61	Accident damage
P 3.0	23	(United States) North American Racing Team (NART)	(United States) Tony Adamowicz (United States) Luigi Chinetti Jr.	Ferrari 312 P Coupe	Ferrari 3.0L V12	56	Overheating
T 2.0	88	(United States) Simone Fleming	(United States) Paul Fleming (United States) Amos Johnson (United States) Bill Bowers	Fiat 124	Fiat 1.4L I4	49	DSQ (Poor driving)
P 2.0	67	(United States) Sports Motors	(United States) Jim Bandy (United States) Fred Stevenson	Lotus Europa	Ford 1.6L I4	48	Rear hub carrier
T +2.0	38	(United States) Dave McClain	(United States) Don Kearney (United States) Joie Chitwood	Chevrolet Camaro	Chevrolet 5.0L V8	47	Engine
T +2.0	41	(United States) Laurel Racing	(United States) Larry Brock (United States) Larry Dent	Chevrolet Camaro	Chevrolet 5.0L V8	40	Oil leak
P 2.0	62	(United Kingdom) Chevron Cars Ltd	(United Kingdom) Brian Robinson (United States) Hugh Kleinpeter	Chevron B16	Ford-Cosworth FVC 1.8L I4	38	Accident
GT; 2.0	74	(United States) Ralph Meaney	(United States) Ralph Meaney (United States) Bill Bean	Porsche 911S	Porsche 2.0L Flat-6	36	Engine
GT +5.0	5	(United States) William A. Schumacher	(United States) Bill Schumacher (United States) Bill Petree	Chevrolet Corvette	Chevrolet 7.0L V8	34	Engine
P 3.0	45	(Germany) Martini International	(United Kingdom) Richard Attwood (France) Gérard Larrousse	Porsche 908/02	Porsche 3.0L Flat-8	31	DSQ (Outside assistance)
S 5.0	17	Porsche-Audi United States	(Germany) Hans Herrmann (Austria) Rudi Lins	Porsche 917K	Porsche 4.5L Flat-12	28	Engine
T 2.0	87	(United States) Robert Whitaker	(United States) Robert Whitaker (United States) Harvey Eckoff (United States) Jack Slottag	Volvo 122 S	Volvo 1.8L I4	25	Oil pressure
S 5.0	30	(United Kingdom) Trevor Graham	(United Kingdom) Piers Forrester (United Kingdom) Andrew Hedges	Ford GT40 Mk.I	Ford 4.9L V8	22	Engine
S 3.0	49	(Germany) Sepp Greger	(Canada) Sepp Greger (Germany) Andreas Schmalbach	Porsche 910	Porsche 1.9L Flat-6	22	Engine
T 5.0	14	(United States) Ray Cuomo Racing	(United States) Ray Cuomo (United States) Bernard Gimbel (United States) George Lissberg	Ford Mustang	Ford 4.7L V8	16	Transmission
T 2.0	86	(United States) Sandy's Spares	(United States) Ronald D. Polimeni (United States) Robert Theall	Volvo 122 S	Volvo 1.8L I4	8	Engine (piston)
GT +5.0	7	(United States) Bruce Morehead Racing	(United States) Bruce Morehead (United States) Milo Vega	AMC AMX	AMC 6.4L V8	8	Engine
GT; 2.0	60	(United States) Herrington Motors	(United States) Robert Kilpatrick (United States) Don Goodrich	MGB	BMC 1.8L I4	7	Massive accident
P 2.0	59	(United States) Waldron Motors	(United States) Reggie Smith Jr. (United States) Dean Donley (United States) Omar Buttari	MG Midget	BMC 1.8L I4	2	Engine
T 2.0	79	(United States) Del Russo Taylor	(United States) Del Russo Taylor (United States) Buzz Dyer (United States) Hank Sheldon	Alfa Romeo GTV 1750	Alfa Romeo 1.75L I4	2	Engine
S 5.0	27	(United Kingdom) Grand Bahama Racing Team	(United Kingdom) Mike De Udy (United Kingdom) Mike Hailwood	Lola T70 Mk.3B	Chevrolet 5.0L V8	1	Brakes

== Statistics ==
- Pole position: #19 SpA Ferrari SEFAC Ferrari 512S Spyder (Mario Andretti/Arturo Merzario)- 2:33.5 (121.970 mph/196.254 km/h)
- Fastest lap: #14 John Wyer Automotive Engineering Porsche 917K (Jo Siffert)- 2:32.77 (122.497 mph/197.102 km/h)
- Distance: 2075.410 km (1281.117 miles)
- Average Speed: 172.667 km/h (106.584 mph)
- Weather conditions: Sunny

World Sportscar Championship
Previous race: 24 Hours of Daytona	1970 season	Next race: 1000km of Brands Hatch
