= Ford P68 =

Sports prototype racing car model

Ford P68/P69
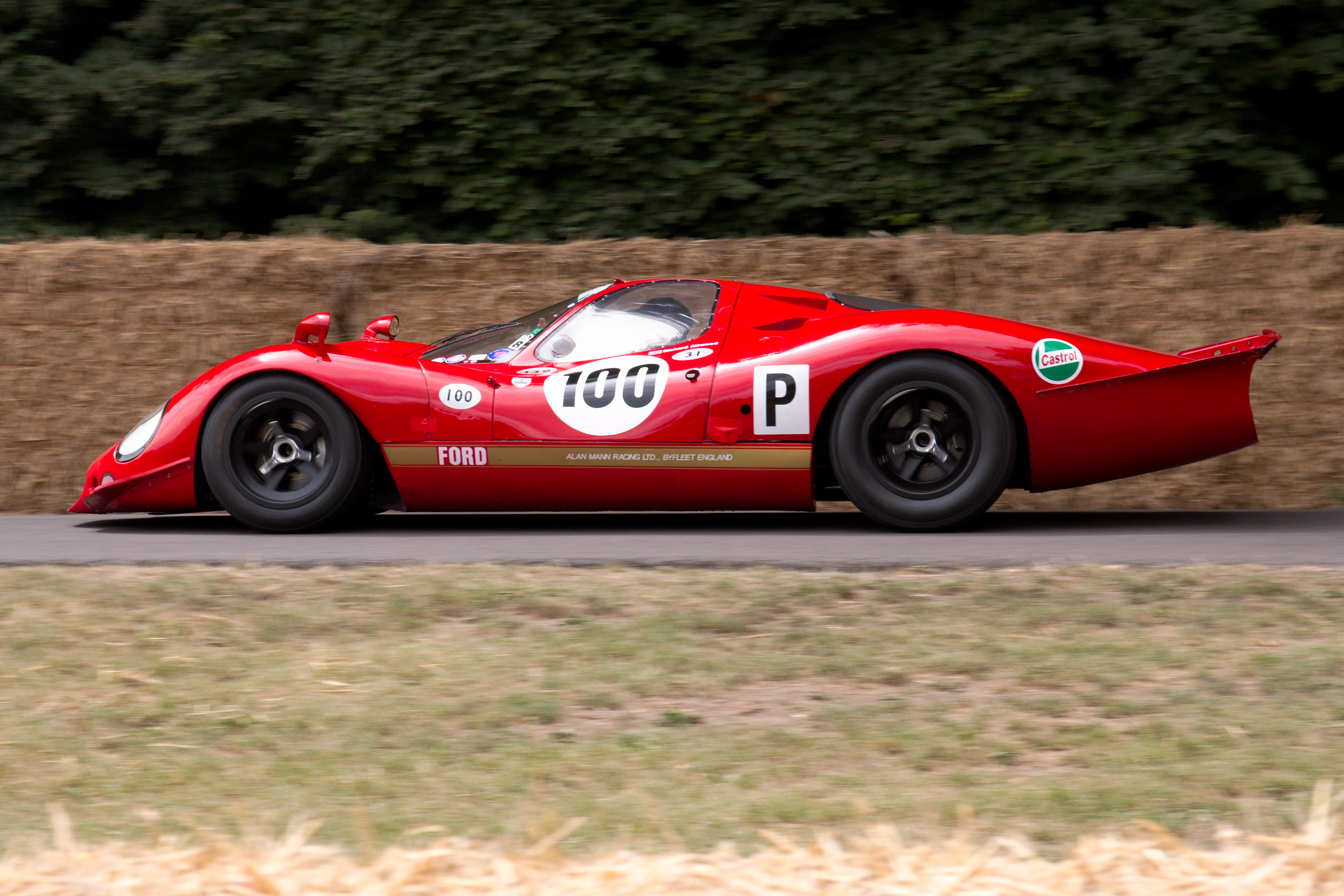
- Category: Sports prototype
- Constructor: Alan Mann Racing
- Designer(s): Len Bailey

Technical specifications
- Chassis: Aluminium monocoque, with steel bulkheads
- Suspension (front): Double wishbone
- Suspension (rear): Single top link with reversed lower wishbone and twin trailing arms
- Engine: Ford-Cosworth DFV 2993cc 90° V8, naturally aspirated, mid mounted
- Transmission: Hewland DG300 5-speed manual
- Fuel: Burmah
- Tyres: Goodyear

Competition history
- Notable entrants: Alan Mann Racing
- Notable drivers: (New Zealand) Bruce McLaren (United Kingdom) Mike Spence (United Kingdom) Chris Irwin (Austria) Jochen Rindt (Mexico) Pedro Rodríguez (Australia) Frank Gardner (United Kingdom) Richard Attwood (New Zealand) Denny Hulme
- Debut: 1968 BOAC 500; Brands Hatch
Races	Wins	Poles	F/Laps
8	0	1	1
- Constructors' Championships: 0
- Drivers' Championships: 0

The Ford P68, also commonly known as the Ford 3L GT or F3L, is a sports prototype racing car model introduced in March 1968. It was designed by Len Bailey, a Ford research engineer, funded by Ford Europe and built by Alan Mann Racing at Weybridge, Surrey, UK. The first competition appearance of a Ford 3L prototype was at the BOAC 500 race at Brands Hatch in Kent. It delivered a good pace, but was criticized for instability at high speeds. It did not finish any of the races in which it was entered, due to mechanical and electrical failures.

For the 1969 season the P68 was used as the basis for an aborted, fully open Spyder, dubbed the Ford P69. The P69 sported large, free-standing aerofoil wings, which were vital to the car's stability at high-speeds. However, these were banned by the European sanctioning body early in the season, thus the P68 was not eligible to race in the respective class any longer.

== Background ==
At the end of the 1967 season the FIA redrew the rules for sports car racing. Engine capacity was limited to 3 litres for the lightest, most advanced Group 6 sports prototype class, while a new 5 litre Group 4 Sports Car class was introduced for vehicles of which at least 50 examples had been built. Ford's American headquarters organisation withdrew from sports car racing at the end of 1967, leaving those teams committed to running the aging GT40 without factory support. While some teams, such as JWA, decided to go down the Group 4 Sports Car route and began work on updating the GT40, Alan Mann Racing decided to build a brand new prototype car around Ford's recently introduced 3.0L DFV V8 Formula One engine.

Raising sponsorship from Ford, as well as Burmah-Castrol and Goodyear, AMR procured the services of leading Ford aerodynamicist Len Bailey, who had designed much of the GT40's bodywork, to work on their new car.

== Design ==
The car was built to Group 6 regulations, with an open two-seat bodywork design. This was perhaps rather liberally interpreted, with only a small hatch in the otherwise enveloping roof being left open to the elements. The hatch also allowed the driver to see the centrally mounted rear-view mirror.

One major advantage of the open prototype regulations was that they permitted a much lower roofline than otherwise would have been possible. Bailey used this to create an extremely low, long, curvaceous, aerodynamically efficient design. With a C_{d} of only 0.27 and a frontal area of 14 ft² the 3.0L engine was sufficient to push the P68 to over 350 km/h, faster than contemporary Formula One cars. However, former driver Frank Gardner has criticised Bailey's pursuit of aerodynamic efficiency at the expense of driver comfort. In order to keep the P68 on the road, Bailey incorporated a patented, vortex-generating tail scoop, intended to create downforce without adding to drag. However, although the car has since been shown to produce moderate downforce at speed, this is mostly over the front wheels. The resultant high-speed instability led to both John Surtees and Jack Brabham refusing to drive the car. Over the following months the P68 sprouted ever larger rear spoilers, and small chin spoilers, in an effort to stabilise the car.

Underneath the curvaceous bodywork, the chassis was a riveted, aluminium monocoque, with steel bulkheads onto which the suspension components were mounted. The DFV engine was supported in an aluminium cradle behind the driver. Unlike the Lotus 49 for which the DFV had been designed, the engine was not used as a structural chassis member. In contrast, the suspension layout was almost a direct copy of contemporary F1 practice. Contemporary observers commented on the oversized front hub components, potentially allowing the car to be converted to four-wheel drive at some point. The radiator was mounted in the nose, although later enhancements to cooling resulted in a wider opening being incorporated from mid-season. Fuel was stored in two deformable cells, one in each sill.

Following poor results, during the winter of 1968 Len Bailey adapted the P68's monocoque to fully exploit the open-roof regulations. A fully open spyder prototype was produced with almost completely new bodywork panels; even lower and wider, it also included a dramatic reduction in length. Mechanicals were carried over from the P68 in almost unchanged form. This new car was numbered the P69, although differences with the P68 were only skin deep. In an attempt to cure the same stability problems that afflicted the P68, the P69 had an innovative system of interconnected, hydraulically-controlled, partially automatic, adjustable aerofoil wings. However, following several accidents with similar systems during Formula One races, the wings were swiftly banned by the FIA early in the season. Without wings, AMR judged that the car would require a complete redesign to be competitive with the dominant Porsches and therefore, lacking funds, the P68/P69 project was abandoned.

== Race history ==
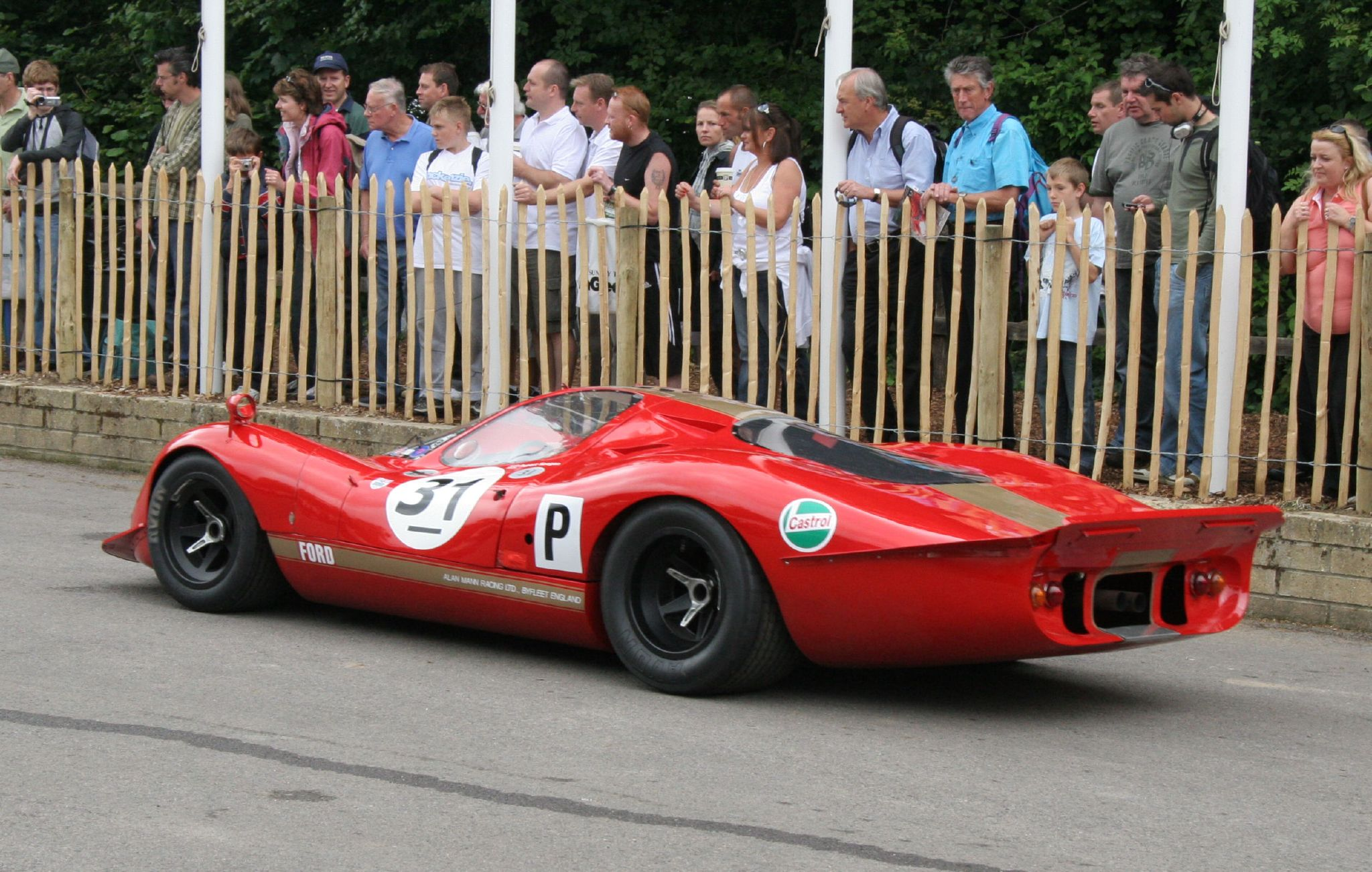
A Ford P68 on display at the Goodwood Festival of Speed.

The first batch of cars was ready for the European season-opening BOAC 500 race, at Brands Hatch on 7 April 1968. Even this early in its career, the P68 had started to grow spoilers and air dams at its front and rear. Two cars were entered, for Bruce McLaren and Denny Hulme, and Jochen Rindt and Mike Spence. However, the two cars were relatively untested, with one actually being brand new, and teething troubles beset the weekend. Although initially slow during practice, gradual tuning and tweaking meant that by the end of qualifying McLaren had managed to put in a lap fast enough to take second place on the grid, splitting the works Porsche 907s. Unfortunately, the Rindt/Spence car had suffered an engine mount failure and failed to qualify. Spence, something of a Brands Hatch specialist, was substituted into the lead car for the race, and was at the wheel, leading the race, when a rubber joint in the transmission failed, putting the car out. Although neither car had finished, the pace and performance while running looked to be promising better for the future.

This promise was never to be fulfilled. With Mike Spence's death during practice for the 1968 Indianapolis 500, fellow Brit Chris Irwin was drafted in for the P68's next race: the 1968 1000km Nürburgring. He was lucky to escape death when he lost control of his car at the Flugplatz during practice, although his injuries were severe enough for his career to be ended. The car was destroyed. In the race, once again the remaining P68 failed to finish due to mechanical gremlins. This was to be the pattern during all the remaining races for which the P68 was entered during 1968. One tantalising highlight occurred when Frank Gardner, who performed much of the P68's limited developmental testing, took pole position at the 1000km Spa race. However, once again the car flattered to deceive, as it stuttered to a halt on the first lap of the race with faulty electrics. By this time the P68's faults were all too apparent, and Alan Mann Racing decided not to travel to the Zeltweg race.

Ford P68 at Goodwood Festival of Speed 2010

For 1969 AMR intended to replace the P68 with its sister car, the P69. However, by the time of the 1969 BOAC 500 race only one P69 was ready. After trying the P69, prior to qualifying, Jack Brabham flatly refused to drive the car in anger so unstable did he find it. That left only a year-old P68 to carry the AMR flag, in the hands of Hulme and Gardner. A large, high-mounted wing was attached directly to the tops of the rear suspension towers, which went some way to reducing rear-end lift at speed, but again an engine failure stopped the car before the end of the race. The final competition outing for the Ford 3L prototype was at the AMOC Martini Trophy meeting at Silverstone. But driver Gardner never even made the grid, as rain during practice soaked the cars electrics, making it unable to start.

== Complete World Championship for Makes results ==
(key) (results in bold indicate pole position; results in italics indicate fastest lap)

Year	Entrants	Chassis	Class	Drivers	1	2	3	4	5	6	7	8	9	10	Points	WEMCP
1968	Alan Mann Racing	P68	Group 6		DAY	SEB	BHC	MNZ	TFO	SPA	NÜR	WGN	ZEL	LMS	0	-
1968	Alan Mann Racing	P68	Group 6	(New Zealand) Bruce McLaren			29								0	-
1968	Alan Mann Racing	P68	Group 6	(United Kingdom) Mike Spence			29								0	-
1968	Alan Mann Racing	P68	Group 6	(Austria) Jochen Rindt			DNS								0	-
1968	Alan Mann Racing	P68	Group 6	(New Zealand) Denny Hulme			PO								0	-
1968	Alan Mann Racing	P68	Group 6	(Australia) Frank Gardner				49	**35**	**36**			DNA		0	-
1968	Alan Mann Racing	P68	Group 6	(United Kingdom) Richard Attwood				49					DNA		0	-
1968	Alan Mann Racing	P68	Group 6	(United Kingdom) Chris Irwin				DNS							0	-
1968	Alan Mann Racing	P68	Group 6	(Mexico) Pedro Rodríguez				DNS							0	-
1968	Alan Mann Racing	P68	Group 6	(Germany) Hubert Hahne					**35**	**36**					0	-
1969	Alan Mann Racing	P69	Group 6		DAY	SEB	BHC	MNZ	TFO	SPA	NÜR	LMS	WGN	ORC	0	-
1969	Alan Mann Racing	P69	Group 6	(Australia) Jack Brabham			DNS								0	-
1969	Alan Mann Racing	P69	Group 6	(Australia) Frank Gardner			DNS								0	-
1969	Alan Mann Racing	P68	Group 6	(Australia) Frank Gardner			32								0	-
1969	Alan Mann Racing	P68	Group 6	(New Zealand) Denny Hulme			32								0	-
1969	Alan Mann Racing	P68	Group 6	(United States) Masten Gregory			PO								0	-

=== Complete entries summary ===
Yr.	Event	Circuit	Drivers	Notes
1968	BOAC 500	Brands Hatch	(New Zealand) Bruce McLaren (New Zealand) Denny Hulme	DNF. Hulme replaced by Spence for race. Transmission failure.
1968	BOAC 500	Brands Hatch	(United Kingdom) Mike Spence (Austria) Jochen Rindt	DNS. Engine mount failed in practice.
1968	1000km Nürburgring	Nürburgring	(Australia) Frank Gardner (United Kingdom) Richard Attwood	DNF. Brake failure.
1968	1000km Nürburgring	Nürburgring	(United Kingdom) Chris Irwin (Mexico) Pedro Rodríguez	DNS. Car written off in practice.
1968	RAC TT	Oulton Park	(United Kingdom) Richard Attwood	DNF. Differential failure.
1968	AMOC 500	Silverstone	(Australia) Frank Gardner	DNF. Engine failure.
1968	1000km Spa	Spa-Francorchamps	(Australia) Frank Gardner (Germany) Hubert Hahne	Pole position, DNF. Electrical failure.
1968	500km Zeltweg	Zeltweg	(Australia) Frank Gardner (United Kingdom) Richard Attwood	DNA.
1968	500km Zeltweg	Zeltweg	n/d	DNA.
1969	BOAC 500	Brands Hatch	(New Zealand) Denny Hulme (United States) Masten Gregory	P68, DNF. Gregory replaced by Gardner for race. Oil pressure.
1969	BOAC 500	Brands Hatch	(Australia) Frank Gardner (Australia) Jack Brabham	P69, DNS. Withdrawn.
1969	AMOC 300	Silverstone	(Australia) Frank Gardner	DNS. Wet electrics.
