= 1969 Targa Florio =

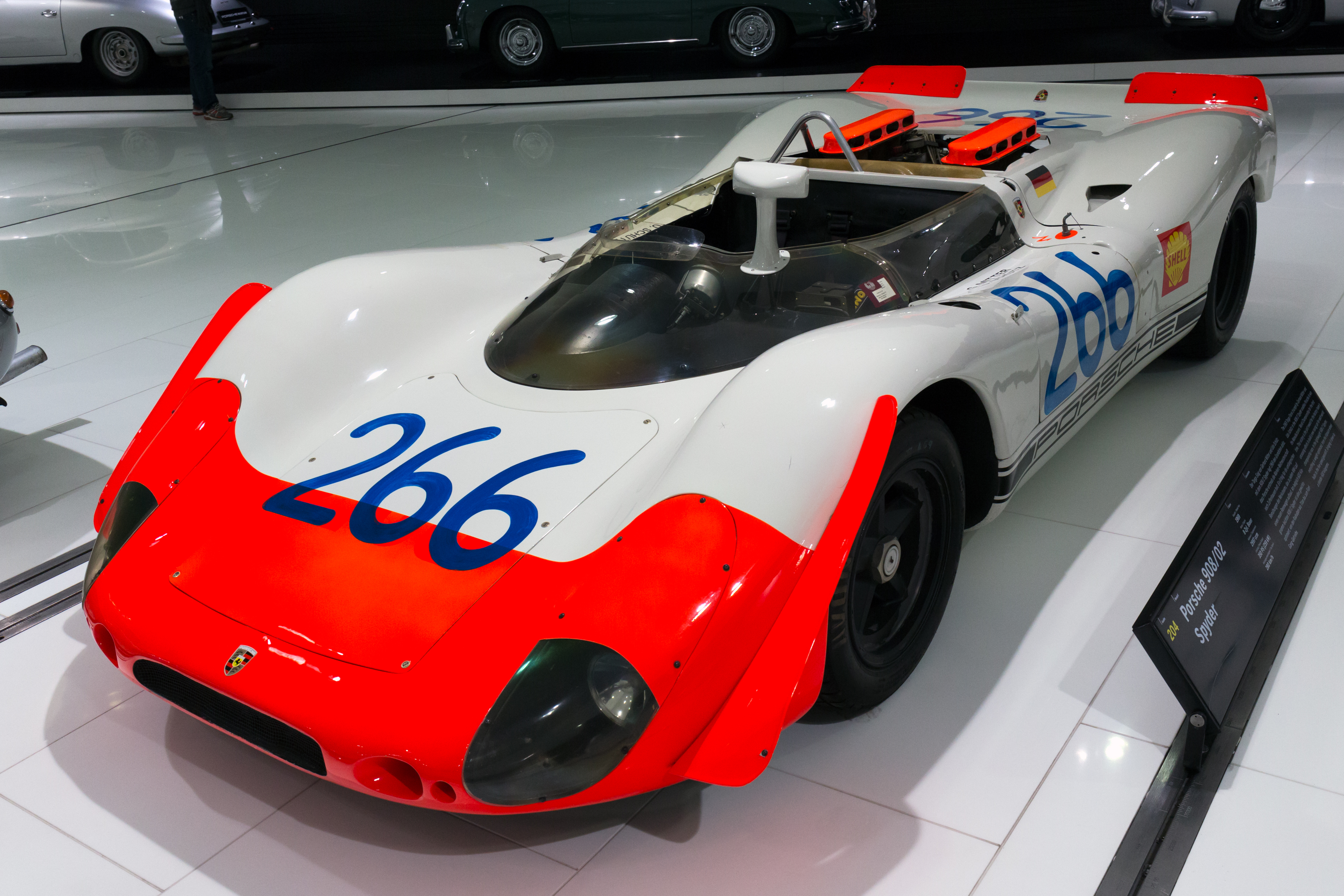
The winning Porsche 908/02 #266 at the Porsche Museum, Stuttgart

The 53rd Targa Florio was a motor race which took place on 4 May 1969, on the Circuito Piccolo delle Madonie, Sicily (Italy). It was race 5 of the 1969 International Championship for Makes.

== Race ==
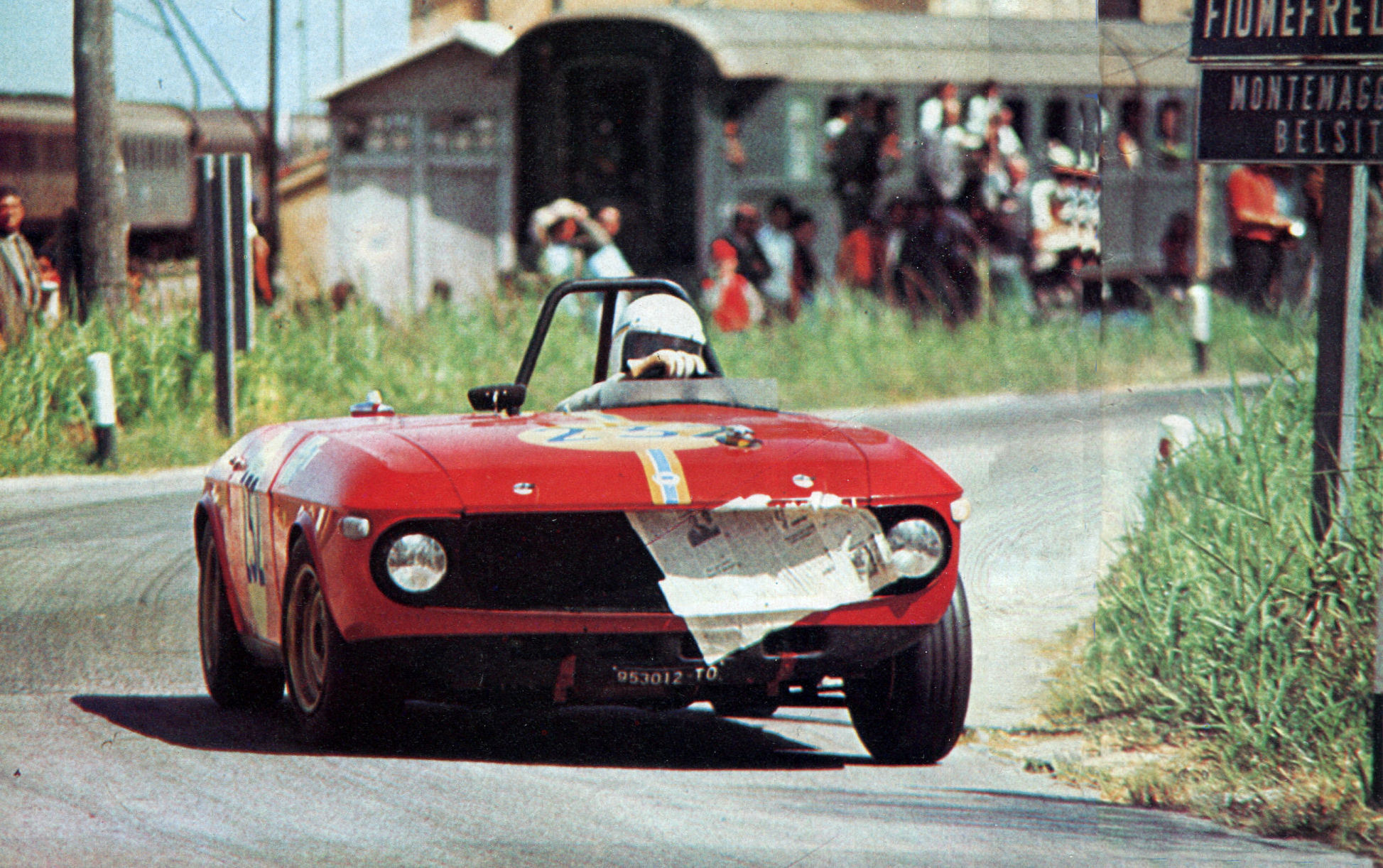
Claudio Maglioli with the Lancia Fulvia HF F&M Special Spider at the Cerda railway station. The newspaper sucked in front of the radiator eventually caused the engine to overheat and an early retirement during lap 4 while the sister car finished 9th.

The year before, in 1968, Porsche did not enter the new Porsche 908 with the full 3.0 liter flat-8 engine, but four 907 with the old flat-8 engine that was maxed out at 2.2 liter. It was the heroic driving of Vic Elford that won the race, beating two Alfas. In 1969, Porsche System Engineering did not bring the new Porsche 917 with the 4.5 liter flat-12, but deployed an unparalleled number of cars among the factory-backed prototypes, no less than six new open top 908/02 plus a T-car in the 3 liter class, supported by two of the 907 2.2, now in the hands of privateers. The factory also brought a special lightweight 911R with the engine of the Porsche 906 that competed in the 2 liter prototype class, not as GT like the many 911S.

Ferrari had boycotted the whole 1968 WSC season including the Targa due to the rule changes limiting prototype engines to 3 liter capacity as in Formula One. For 1969, the Ferrari 312 P was built based on the F1 car, a pretty and promising vehicle but with disappointing results. It was beaten by Porsche at Brands Hatch and at Monza, and not entered at the Targa, the 1969 Spanish Grand Prix taking place on the same weekend the official reason, lack of funds an inofficial one. Soon, Enzo Ferrari would sell shares to FIAT, and invest in building the Ferrari 512S. For number of years, Ferrari could not provide suitable cars even for their most loyal teams, such as the Scuderia Filipinetti, which in 1969 used a cumbersome and outdated Lola T70-Chevrolet.

The only brand that could challenge Porsche was Alfa Romeo which deployed five Tipo 33/2. Unlike Porsche, Alfa had barely improved: four with the 2 liter V8 engine, two of them being lumped into the same S5.0 class as the 5 liter Chevy-powered Lola, the others as prototypes. One Alfa was in the P3.0 class as it had the enlarged 2.5L engine, already driven by Nino Vaccarella in the 1968 event).

In 1968, Vic Elford had qualified his Porsche 907 2.2 at 36:47,7, and set fastest lap at 36:02,3 (119,872 km/h) while catching up and win. With the 908/02 he was nearly a minute faster, 35:54,7 in practise, fastest race lap 35:08,2 (122,948 km/h) after having to pit to get a broken fan belt replaced, which took six minutes and gave him another opportunity for a heroic drive. Stommelen/Herrmann qualified second with 36:22,2, Mitter/Schütz third at 36:25,1. The best non-Porsche with 37:08,7 was the Lola-Chevy of Herbert Müller/Jo Bonnier, both of them two-time Targa winners in Porsches. With 37:16,0, Vaccarella in the Alfa Romeo T33/2.5 Spyder was barely faster than Giunti/Galli with the regular Alfa Romeo T33/2 at 37:21,5 in 6th.

Unlike earlier years, when the slowest cars started first like in the Mille Miglia, the fastest qualifiying cars were now supposed to go first. Yet it was local hero Vaccarella who was sent out first, followed and quickly chased down by the Porsches, and others in rather quick succession. The big Lola was sent off late and had to pass many cars before suspension was damaged. The local hero Vaccarella, teamed with Andrea de Adamich, had to retire during lap 6 for engine failure while the other Autodelta T33 crashed when Elford came charging.

The 1969 Targa resulted in a one-sided race for the Porsche 908/02. While three had technical problems early in the race, others ran well, but not without "moments". In the last lap, Mitter in the leading car noticed the oil temperature rising to 140 degrees Celsius. Suspecting a typical Targa problem, debris stuck in front of a radiator, Mitter stopped and removed a bag from the air intake in the nose. He still finished minutes ahead of Elford. The surviving four 908/02 took first to fourth overall places, followed by a private Alfa Romeo, and then by two 907.

The winning car completed the 10 laps of 72km in 6:07:45,3, coming close to the 6 hours mark considered a minimum for endurance races, the other being 1000km distance. Starting in the 1970 Targa Florio, the distance was raised to 11 laps and 792km.

== Official results ==
This table only shows the cars that completed the full 10 lap race. Complete results at the German page:.

Pos	Class	No	Team	Drivers	Chassis	Laps
1	P 3.0	266	(Germany) Porsche System Engineering	(Germany) Gerhard Mitter (Germany) Udo Schütz	Porsche 908/02	10
2	P 3.0	270	(Germany) Porsche System Engineering	(England) Vic Elford (Italy) Umberto Maglioli	Porsche 908/02	10
3	P 3.0	274	(Germany) Porsche System Engineering	(Germany) Hans Herrmann (Germany) Rolf Stommelen	Porsche 908/02	10
4	P 3.0	272	(Germany) Porsche System Engineering	(Germany) Willi Kauhsen (Germany) Karl Freiherr von Wendt	Porsche 908/02	10
5	P 2.0	248	(Italy) Scuderia Madunina	(Italy) Enrico Pinto (Italy) Giovanni Alberti	Alfa Romeo T33/2	10

World Sportscar Championship
Previous race: 1000 km Monza	1969 season	Next race: 1000 km Spa
