= Howmet TX =

Sports-prototype racing car

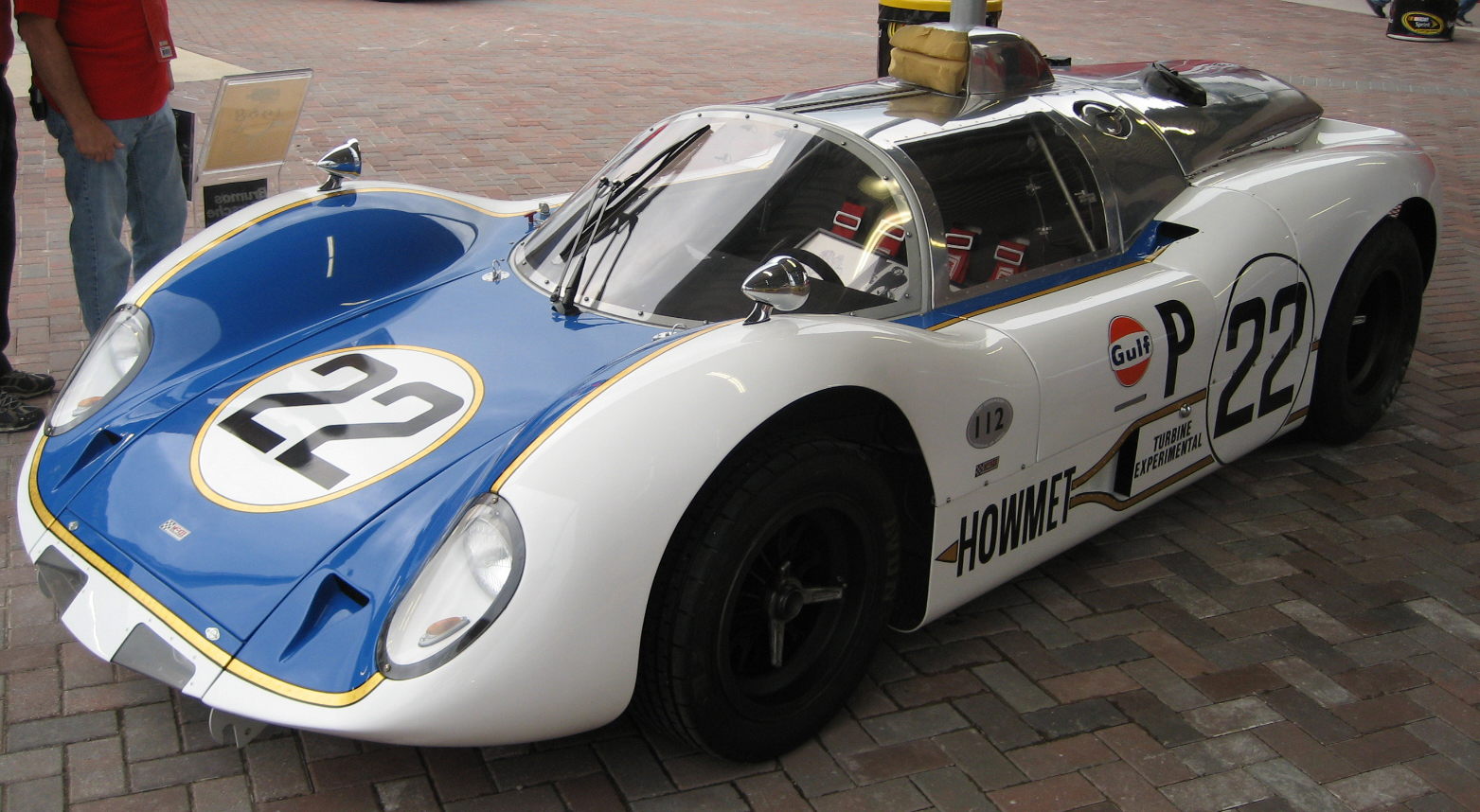
- Category: Group 6 sports prototype
- Constructor: McKee Engineering
- Designers: (United States) Ray Heppenstall (United States) Bob McKee

Technical specifications
- Chassis: Tubular space frame
- Suspension (front): Double wishbone with coil spring
- Suspension (rear): Double wishbone with coil spring
- Length: 154 in (3,900 mm)
- Width: 71.5 in (1,820 mm)
- Height: 46.5 in (1,180 mm)
- Axle track: Front: 58.5 in (1,490 mm); Rear: 56.5 in (1,440 mm)
- Wheelbase: 93.5 in (2,370 mm) or 91.25 in (2,318 mm)
- Engine: Continental TS325-1 2,960 cc (181 cu in) two-stage gas turbine mid-mounted
- Transmission: 1-speed (electric motor for reverse)
- Fuel: Jet A
- Tires: Goodyear

Competition history
- Notable entrants: (United States) Howmet Corporation
- Notable drivers: (United States) Ray Heppenstall (United States) Dick Thompson (United States) Ed Lowther (United States) Bob Tullius (United Kingdom) Hugh Dibley
- Debut: 1968 24 Hours of Daytona
- Last season: 1968
Races	Wins	Poles	F/Laps
11	2^{1}	2	N/A
- Constructors' Championships: 0
- Drivers' Championships: 0

The Howmet TX (Turbine eXperimental) is an American sports prototype racing car designed in 1968 to test the competitive use of a gas turbine engine in sports car racing. Planned by racing driver Ray Heppenstall, the TX combined a chassis built by McKee Engineering, turbine engines leased from Continental Aviation & Engineering, and financial backing and materials from the Howmet Corporation.

Although not the first attempt at using a turbine powerplant in auto racing, the Howmet TX was the first and is still the only turbine to win a race, earning two Sports Car Club of America (SCCA) race victories and two qualifying sprint victories during its only year of competition. The TX later set six Fédération Internationale de l'Automobile (FIA) land speed records for turbines after being retired from racing.

== Development ==
Interest in the use of gas turbines as an alternative to the piston engine had been gaining support in the automobile industry during the 1960s. Chrysler had begun testing in the 1950s and began leasing their Turbine Car to the public in 1963, while British manufacturer Rover and racing team BRM combined to build a racing car for the 24 Hours of Le Mans in 1963 and 1965. Both cars showed reliability but were unable to win over the public or to win at Le Mans respectively. By 1967, team owner and car developer Andy Granatelli had created the STP-Paxton Turbocar for the Indianapolis 500. The car nearly won the race driven by Parnelli Jones, but suffered a mechanical failure after leading over two-thirds of the event. A similar attempt with a Lotus 56 in 1968 also led to retirement after showing winning potential.

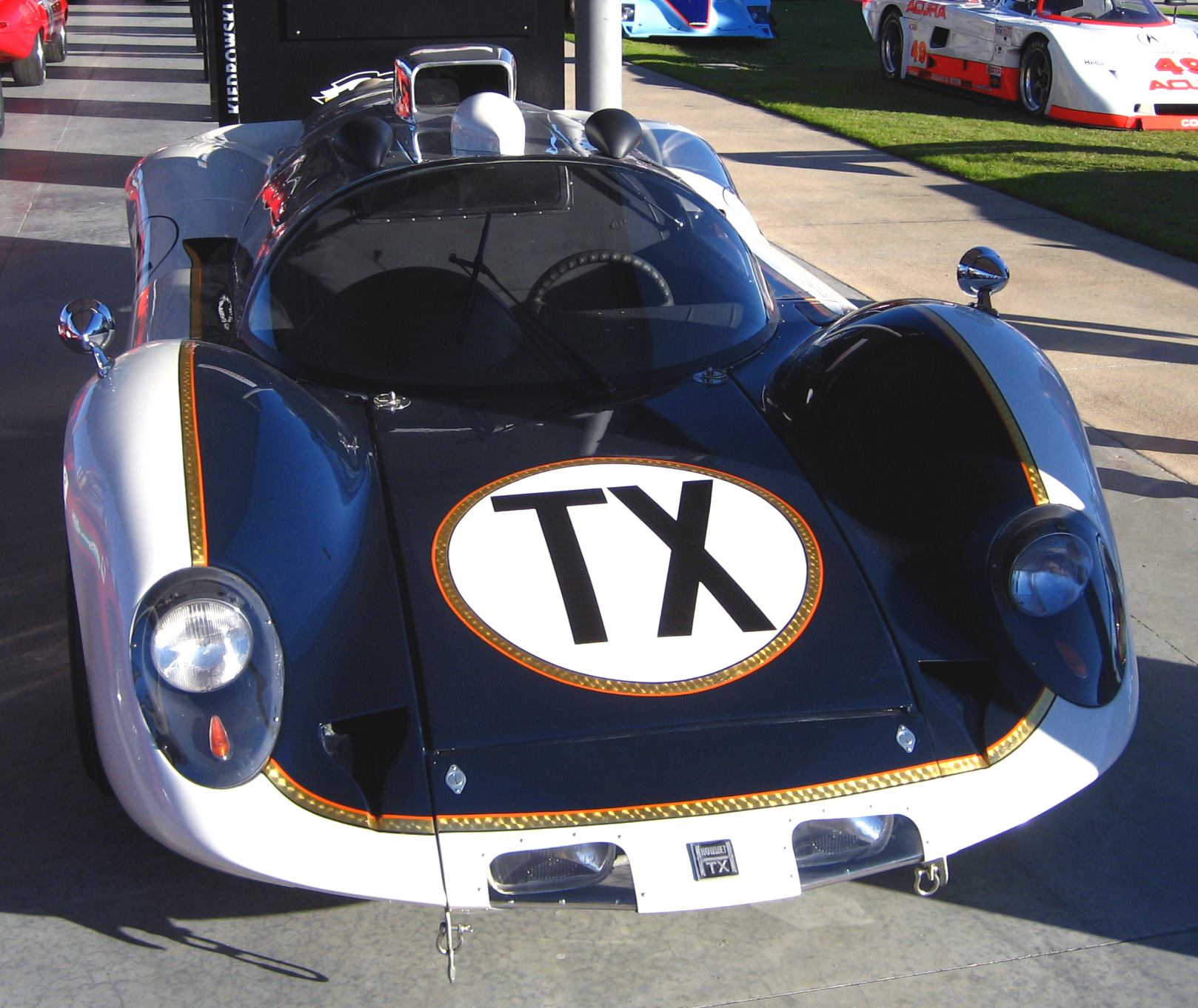
The Howmet TX was built on the McKee Mk.9 chassis. This is the first example of two built in period.

At the same time as Granatelli's turbine debut at Indy, racer Ray Heppenstall began to conceive a design for his own sports car to make use of a gas turbine, improving in some areas where the Rover-BRM had failed several years before. Heppenstall felt that a more simplified design for the chassis could make a turbine-powered car more competitive. Heppenstall originally proposed the car to Allison Engine Company and later to Williams Research. He eventually turned to fellow racer Tom Fleming for aid. Fleming was at the time vice-president of Howmet Corporation, which provided castings for turbines in the aerospace industry. Heppenstall and Fleming were able to convince Howmet that their backing of a competitive and unique sports car could promote public awareness of the company. Howmet agreed to fund the project, lending their name to the car.

=== Chassis ===
Heppenstall began the project by purchasing a Cooper Monaco sports car, but later decided it was not the best choice for a turbine and the car was sold off. Bob McKee, owner of McKee Engineering, was then contracted by Heppenstall to build two cars brand new. The first space frame chassis was actually built from an older McKee car initially built for the Can Am series in 1966, but adapted to house the turbine engine. The second car #GTP2 was built from scratch, allowing it to be purposely designed around the use of a turbine engine, including a chassis 2.25 inches (57 mm) longer. The chassis were known as the Mk.9 to McKee, but only ever raced as turbines under the Howmet TX guise.

The Mk.9 was designed around the FIA's Group 6 regulations for sports prototypes, allowing for a completely custom mid-engine layout that was only limited in terms of engine sizes available to competitors. Closed cockpit bodywork with gullwing doors was designed by Bob McKee to shroud the mid-engine layout. Standard double wishbone suspension with coil springs were used with disc brakes on each wheel. A 32-US-gallon (120 L; 27 imp gal) fuel tank was placed between the cockpit and turbine, housing Jet A fuel.

=== Turbine ===
The turbines to power the two Howmet TXs were leased from Continental Aviation & Engineering. The TS325-1 gas turbines were prototypes from an aborted bid for a military helicopter contract which Continental was not putting to use at the time. The loaned turbines weighed 170 pounds (77 kg) and were able to provide 350 bhp (260 kW) and 650 lbf⋅ft (880 N⋅m) of torque. A maximum of 57,000 rpm was able to be reached.

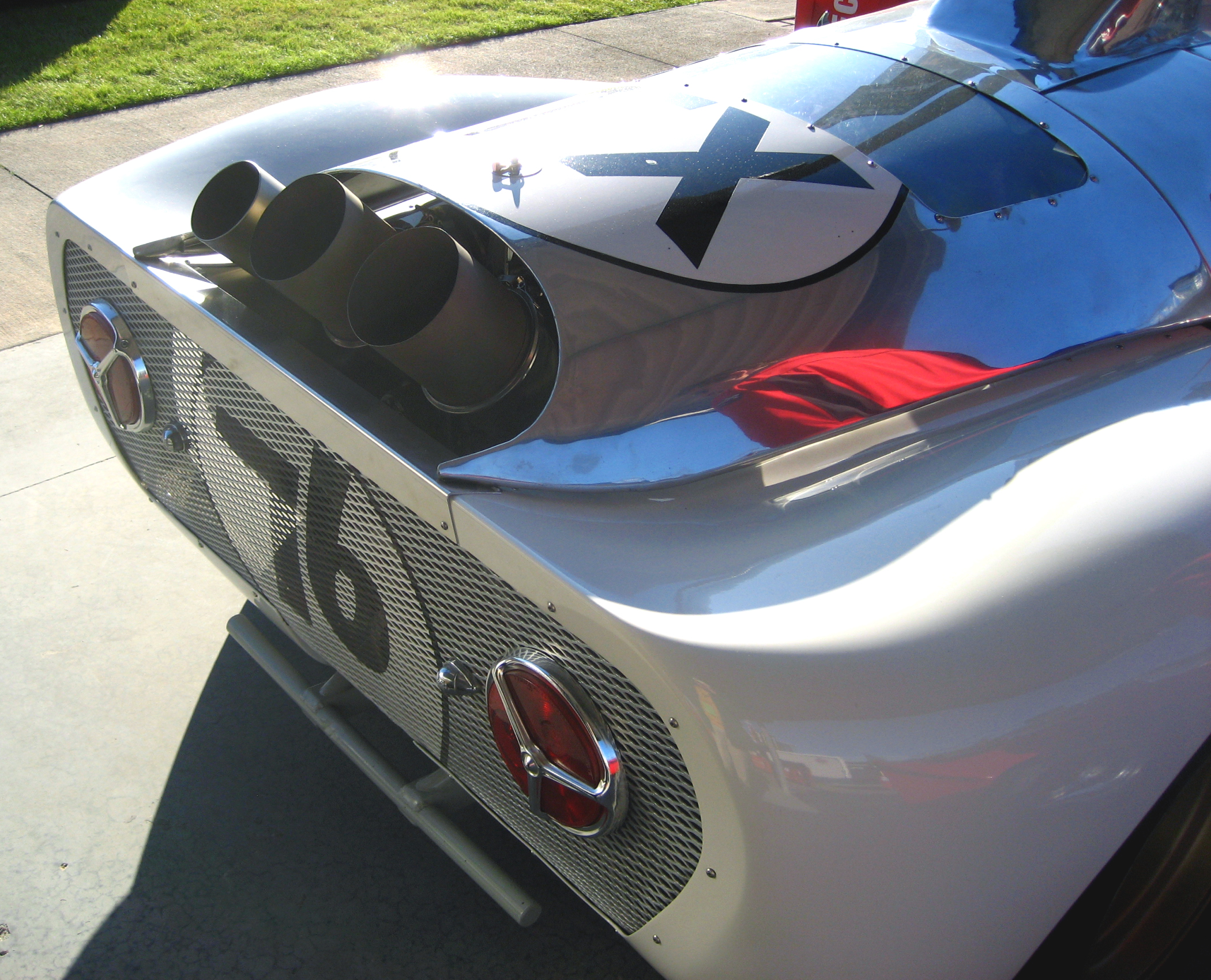
The exhaust pipes for the original Continental turbine. The smaller pipe at the back is for the turbine's wastegate.

A two-stage setup used an internal power turbine to drive the rear wheels through the use of reduction gearing. Due to the wide variable output of the turbine and the high level of torque, a standard gearbox was not necessary, leaving the Howmet TX with only a single gearing speed. However, the gearing ratios were able to be quickly changed in the differential, allowing the car to be adapted to various circuits. Due to the use of a single-speed transmission, there was no gearing for reverse. Although Heppenstall initially wished to do without reverse, the FIA mandated its use and a small electric motor powered by the turbine was installed, allowing the car to move in reverse.

The turbine itself used two large exhaust pipes. However, a third pipe was situated off-center for use with a wastegate. The wastegate was designed to eliminate the lag between the driver pressing the accelerator and the turbine increasing its revolutions. Once the turbine was at its maximum revolutions, the wastegate helped regulate the flow of hot gas from the core to the power-turbine, thus increasing or decreasing the power output to the gearbox far quicker than the core could adjust mass-flow by itself.

Although turbines cannot have their displacement measured in the same way as a piston engine, the FIA used an equivalence formula to determine the Continental TS325-1's displacement of 2,960 cubic centimetres (181 cu in), although Heppenstall has since admitted that the engine was actually above the three-liter limit. This allowed the Howmet to compete in the Prototype Under 3000 cc category of the Group 6 formula.

== Racing history ==
Following completion of the two Howmet TXs, the cars were brought to the 24 Hours of Daytona, the opening round of the 1968 International Championship for Makes. Before even entering competition the TX earned attention, and was featured prominently on the cover of the race program. Although both cars were in attendance, only the newer (#GTP2) of the two was entered in the race; the other car (#GTP1) was kept as a spare. The driving team of Heppenstall, Dick Thompson, and Ed Lowther qualified with a lap time seventh fastest overall. Several competitors made early refueling stops allowing the Howmet to improve to third place but on lap 34 the turbine wastegate failed to reopen, giving the driver too much power for the corner he was in. The car spun and hit a barrier, forcing the team to retire.

By the 12 Hours of Sebring a few weeks later, the TX was able to improve its pace, this time qualifying third, only a second behind a Porsche 907 and a Ford GT40. The turbine ran reliably at first but, as the race continued, debris damaged the turbine and caused it to shake loose from its mounts. The TX was eventually retired after six hours. Following Sebring, the International Championship returned to Europe, and the Howmet team followed. They entered the BOAC 500 at Brands Hatch. Wastegate problems once again caused the car to crash, this time after only seven laps. Staying in England, the Howmet team entered a national sprint race at Oulton Park for English driver Hugh Dibley. The failure of a starter motor during a pit stop, however, once again denied the TX the possibility of finishing the hour-long event.

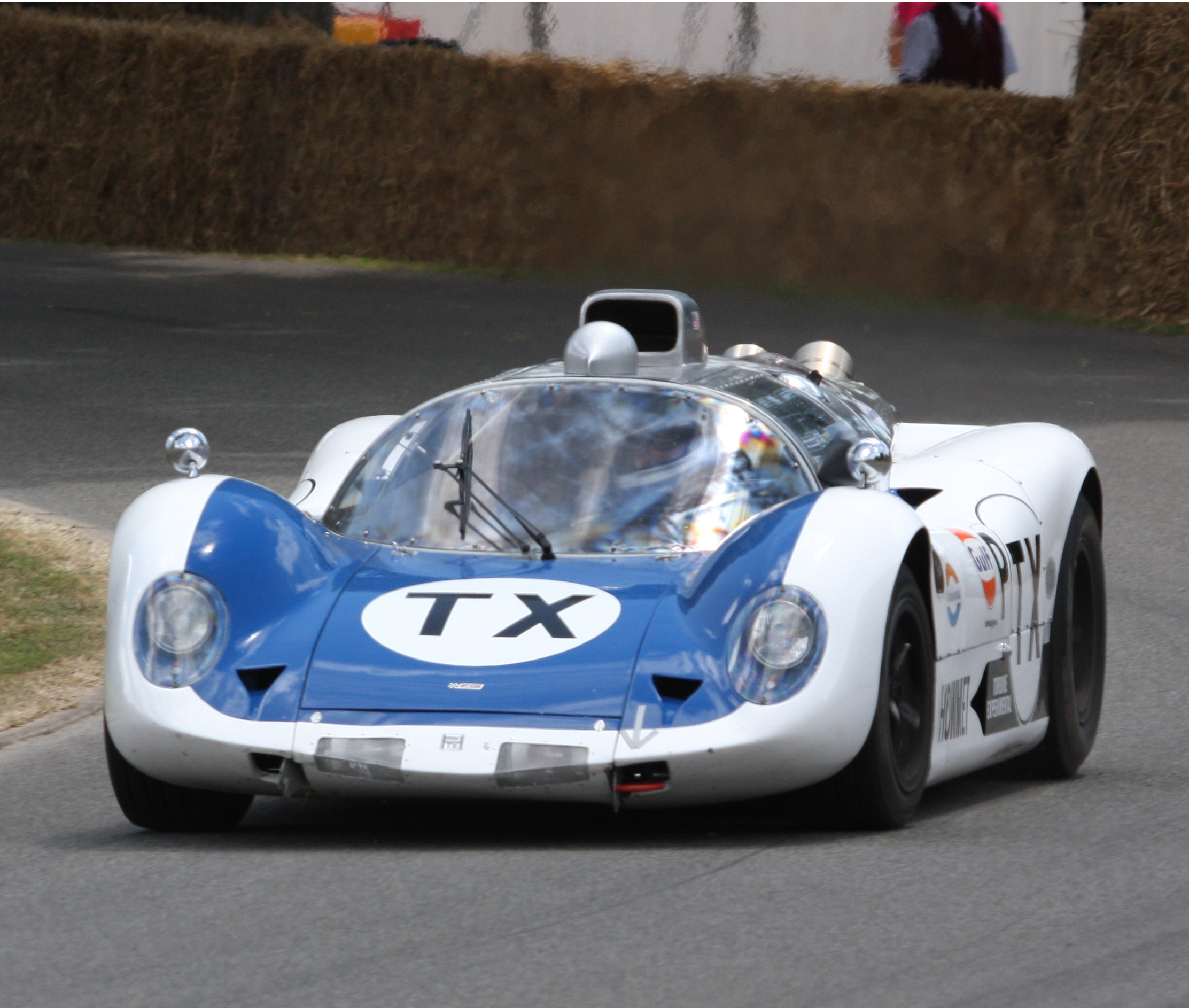
Howmet TX chassis #GTP2 running at the Goodwood Festival of Speed in 2009

The TX returned to the United States to contest the SCCA National Championship rather than stay in Europe for the remainder of the International Championship. Closer to home, the problems with the experimental TX were able to be overcome as the car finished its first race, the Vandergraft Trophy in New Cumberland, West Virginia. Heppenstall drove the car to a second-place finish, setting a new lap record for the circuit. Following a retirement in Michigan, the TX next arrived at the Heart of Dixie event in Huntsville, Alabama. A short sprint race was held on the day prior to the main race in order to determine the starting order of the field. The Howmet TX was able to earn victory in the sprint, allowing it to start on pole position for the main event. From there the TX dominated the event and earned another win. These two victories marked the first-ever wins by a turbine-powered car in a racing event.

With the first victory earned by the Howmet TX, Heppenstall was once again joined by Dick Thompson for the Marlboro 300. Once again the car won the short qualifying race to earn pole position and went on to lead every lap of the main event, winning by an eleven-lap margin. Feeling that the TX was now capable of taking on European entries, both TXs were entered in the 6 Hours of Watkins Glen, another round of the International Championship. Hugh Dibley and newcomer Bob Tullius were entered in the first car, while Heppenstall and Thompson shared the second. The cars qualified eighth and ninth fastest. Following early accidents by the factory Porsches the TX cars were running third and fourth overall. The Dibley and Tullius car suffered a transmission problem in the closing hour requiring the car to crawl around the circuit until the end of the race. The other entry remained on pace until the end, finishing on the podium overall and was the highest finisher in its class. The podium earned Howmet four points towards the International Championship.

After the Watkins Glen success, the two cars were prepared for an attempt at the 24 Hours of Le Mans, which had been postponed until September. French aluminum company Pechiney sponsored the team's bid at the 24 hours. The same drivers were assigned to the cars, but their qualifying performance at the Circuit de la Sarthe was hampered by the long straights. Twentieth fastest was the best performance from the two cars.

For the race itself, mechanical problems appeared early as Thompson's car suffered after only three laps. The fuel system was not providing enough Jet A to the turbine to allow it to produce its full power output, meaning the car had to limp down the circuit's long straights. While that car continued at a slowed pace, the other suffered a wheel bearing failure two hours later, requiring a lengthy three-hour repair. By the sixth hour of the event the car was disqualified by race officials, having covered an insufficient distance of only 60 laps. The remaining fuel-starved TX did not last much longer as Thompson crashed in the Indianapolis corner.

With the 1968 season over, Heppenstall planned for the following year, including the development of a new multi-gear transmission to replace the single speed unit. However, Howmet felt that the program was not providing adequate promotion for the company and decided to discontinue it.

=== Land speed records ===
Howmet decided in 1969 that although the racing program was too expensive to continue, the two cars it owned could still be put to promotional use. Heppenstall decided that he would attempt to repair the second TX chassis (#GTP2) to adapt new open-cockpit bodywork, earning it the name Howmet TX Mk.II. The new vehicle attempted to break world land speed records for turbine-powered cars. With the TX Mk.II weighing approximately 1,000 kilograms (2,200 lb), the car was able to make attempts at two classes of records thanks to the addition or subtraction of ballast.

On a road next to Talladega Superspeedway in August 1970, Heppenstall drove the TX Mk.II to six records recognized by the FIA, with the timing recorded by the new International Motor Sports Association (IMSA).

FIA Speed Records
Class	Type	Time seconds	Speed	
Class	Type	Time seconds	km/h	mph
Class 2 (over 500 kg, under 1000 kg)	Standing start, ¼ mi	11.83	122.41	76.06
Class 2 (over 500 kg, under 1000 kg)	Standing start, ½ km	13.48	133.53	82.97
Class 2 (over 500 kg, under 1000 kg)	Standing start, 1 km	21.18	167.97	104.37
Class 3 (over 1000 kg)	Standing start, ¼ mi	13.87	104.41	64.88
Class 3 (over 1000 kg)	Standing start, ½ km	15.74	114.35	71.05
Class 3 (over 1000 kg)	Standing start, 1 km	23.92	150.50	93.52

=== Later use ===
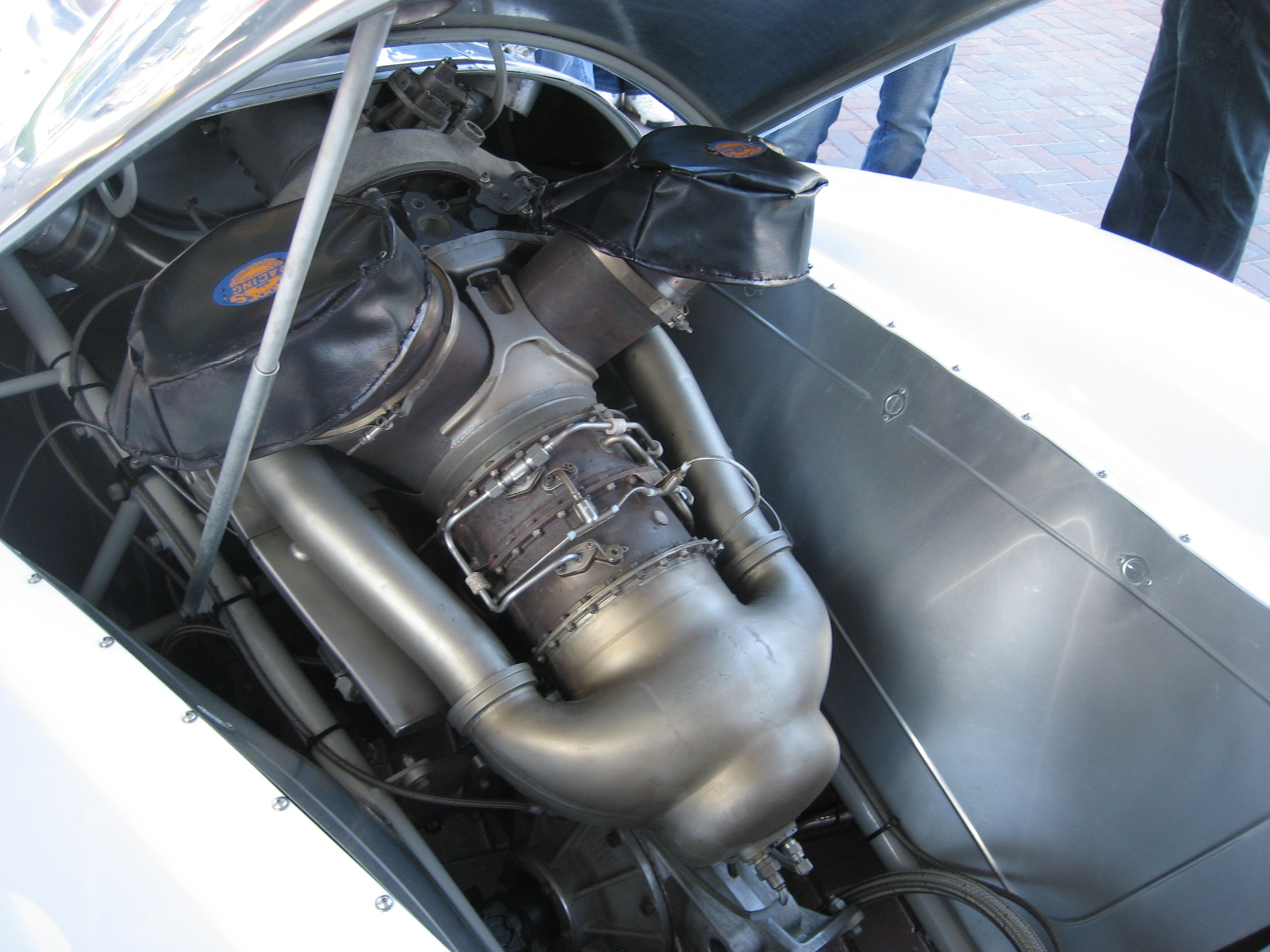
An Allison 250C18 turbine installed in chassis #GTP3.

In 1971, Howmet ended their promotional use of the two TX cars. The two chassis were sold to Ray Heppenstall for one US dollar. However, because the two Continental turbines had been leased to Howmet, they had to be returned once the cars were no longer under Howmet's control. Heppenstall eventually sold the two chassis.

Chassis #GTP1 was bought by Jim Brucker and stored in his personal collection in California. On display, it featured a mock-up of the Continental turbine in the engine bay. The car was bought in 2006 by Bruce Linsmeyer of Avon Aero and has been restored with an original Continental turbine. Following restoration, #GTP1 won the Sebring Trophy at the 2007 Amelia Island Concours d'Elegance.

The second car, chassis #GTP2, was converted from its open-cockpit bodywork back into its original closed-cockpit design in a restoration carried out by McKee Engineering at the behest of new owner Chuck Haines. The restoration of Chassis #GTP2 was completed in July 1996. Original Continental turbines could not be obtained, so an Allison 250C18 turbine was installed. During Haines' ownership of chassis #GTP2, Bob McKee completed a spare frame, known as #GTP3, to original specification for Haines. Again, due to the lack of a Continental turbine, an Allison unit was used instead. The different powerplant required some redesign, as the exhaust was now vented out of the top of the engine cover instead of out the rear of the car. #GTP3 does not have the wastegate system. Haines has entered the car in historic motorsport events, including the 2007 Goodwood Festival of Speed.
