= 1968 World Sportscar Championship =

Racing tournament

Seasons
- ← 1967 1969 →

The 1968 World Sportscar Championship season was the 16th season of FIA World Sportscar Championship racing and featured the 1968 International Championship for Makes and the 1968 International Cup for GT Cars. The former was contested by Group 6 Sports Prototypes, Group 4 Sports Cars and Group 3 Grand Touring Cars and the later by Group 3 Grand Touring Cars only. The two titles were decided over a ten race series which ran from 3 February 1968 to 29 September 1968, but one race was only worth half points, and only the five best results were counted.

Following a very fast 1967 24 Hours of Le Mans, the engine size of prototypes from 1968 onwards was limited to 3 litres, forcing the retirement of Ford's 7-litre prototypes as well as Ferrari's 4-litre P series. Even though the engine size was the same as in Formula 1 since 1966, the F1 engines did not last 1000km or 24 hours, while downsized engines lacked power and torque, causing a problem for the prototype class. Ferrari stayed absent in protest, while old 5-litre Ford GT40 as well as Lola and some others makes could still enter as sportscars if at least 50 cars had been built.

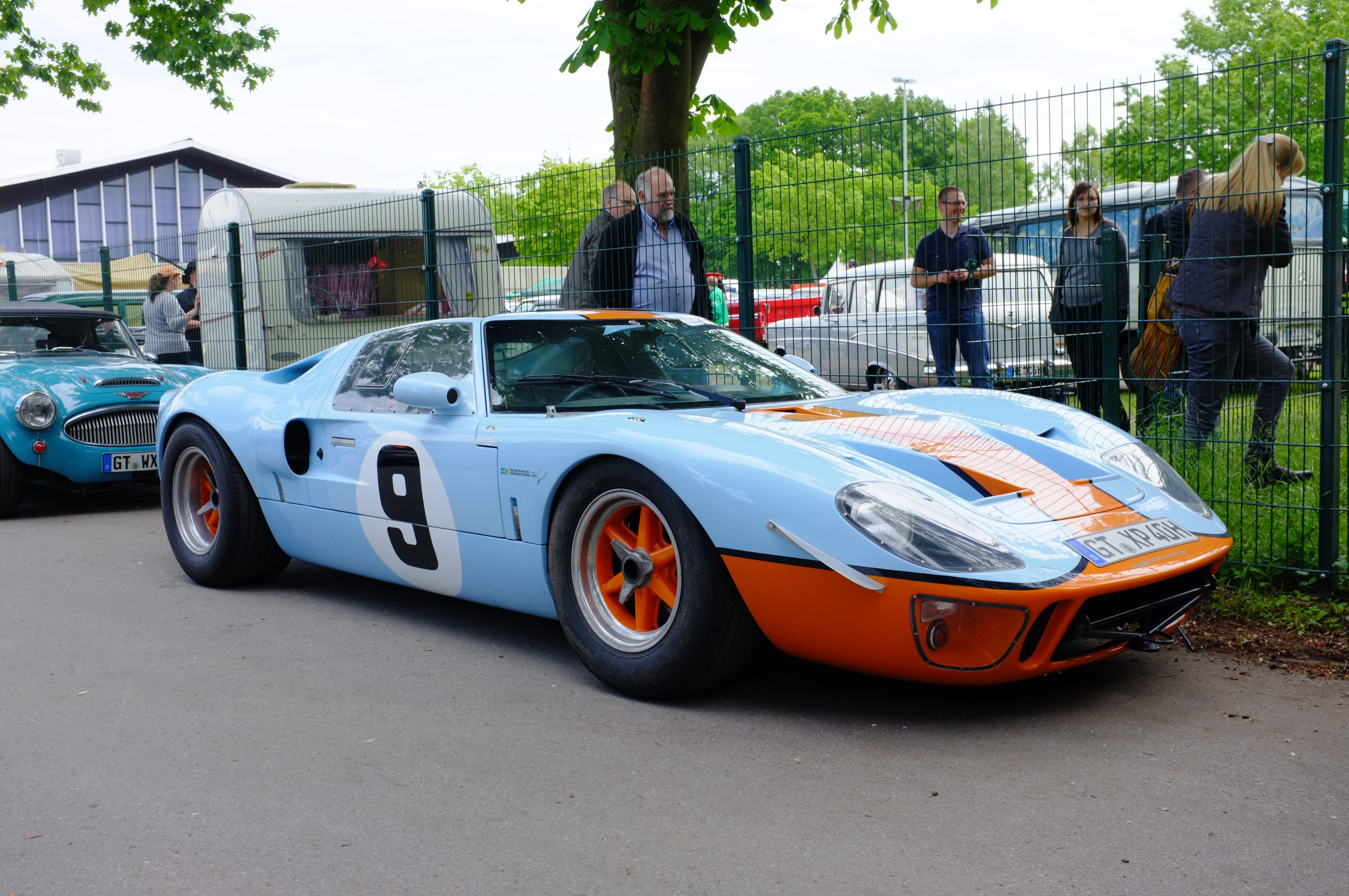
Replica of the Gulf-sponsored 1964 Ford GT40 4,5-litre which was successful in 1968 due to being a sportscar of which at least 50 had been made

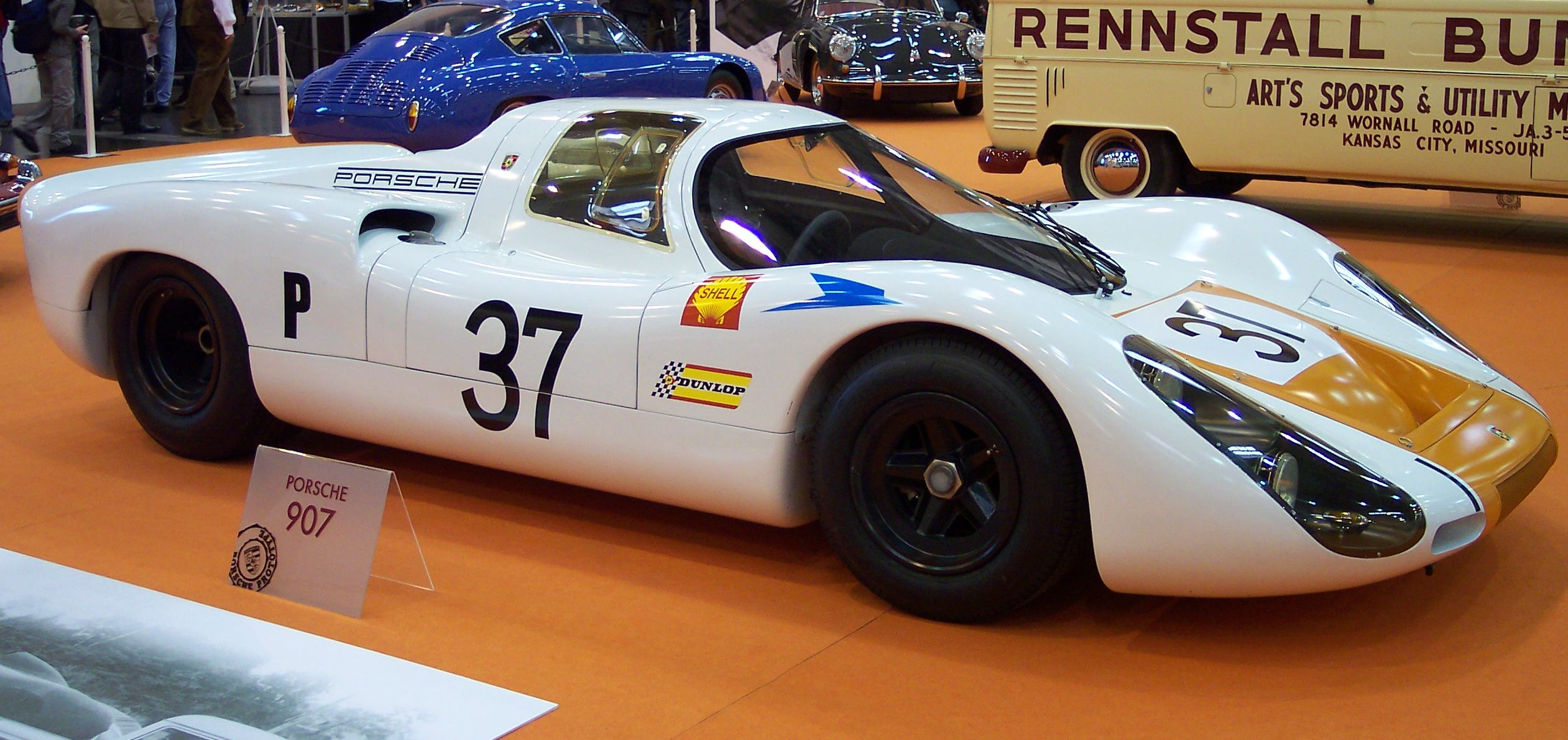
Porsche 907 prototypes like this, with undersized 2200cc engines, provided most of Porsche results in 1968

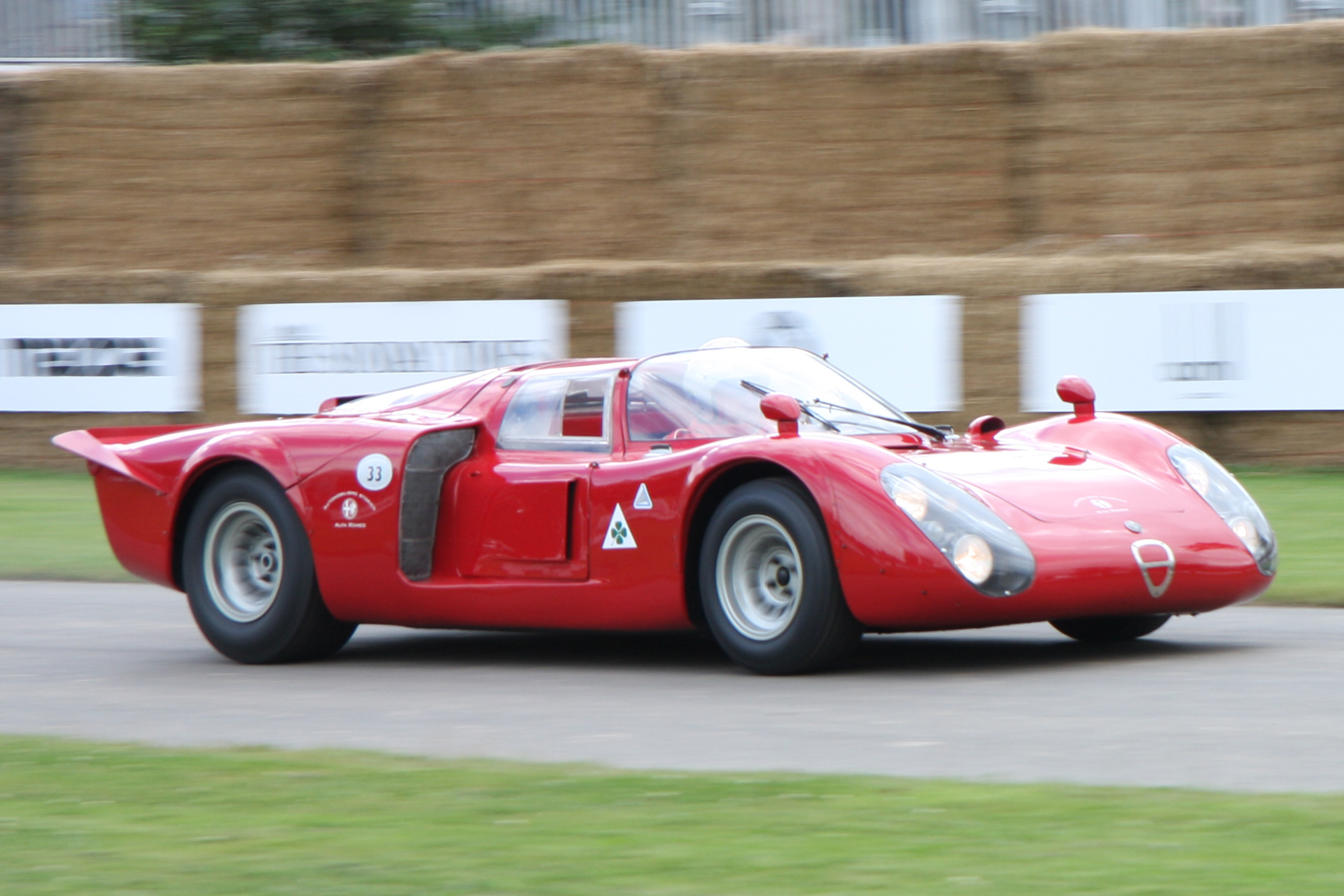
Alfa Romeo Tipo 33/2 named Daytona Coupe due to winning the 2-litre-class there in 1968. Alfa came 2nd at the Targa and 3rd in the championship

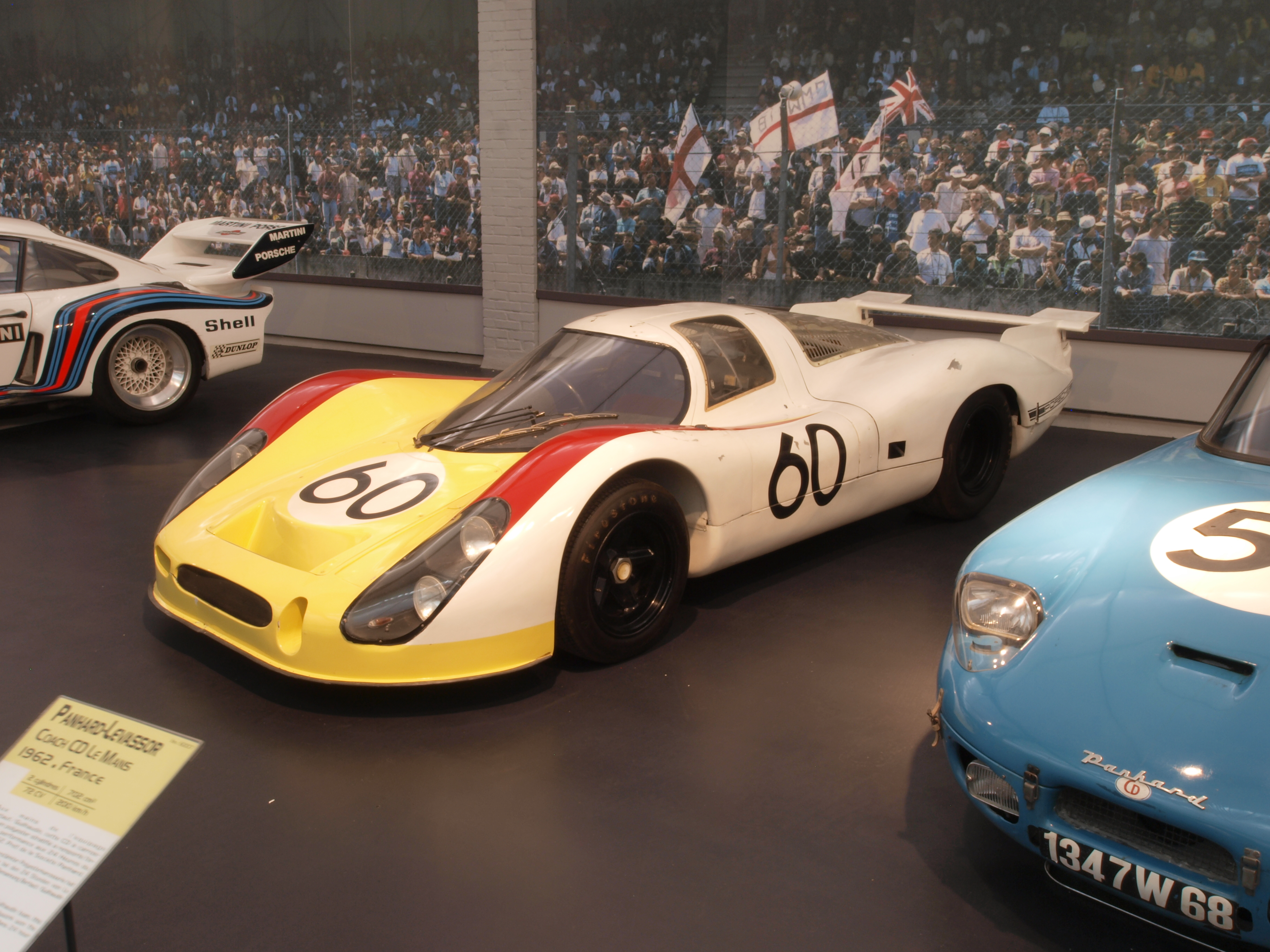
Porsche 908 longtail at Cité de l'Automobile. This Chassis 908-013 has finished 3rd in Le Mans in 1972, like it did already in 1968

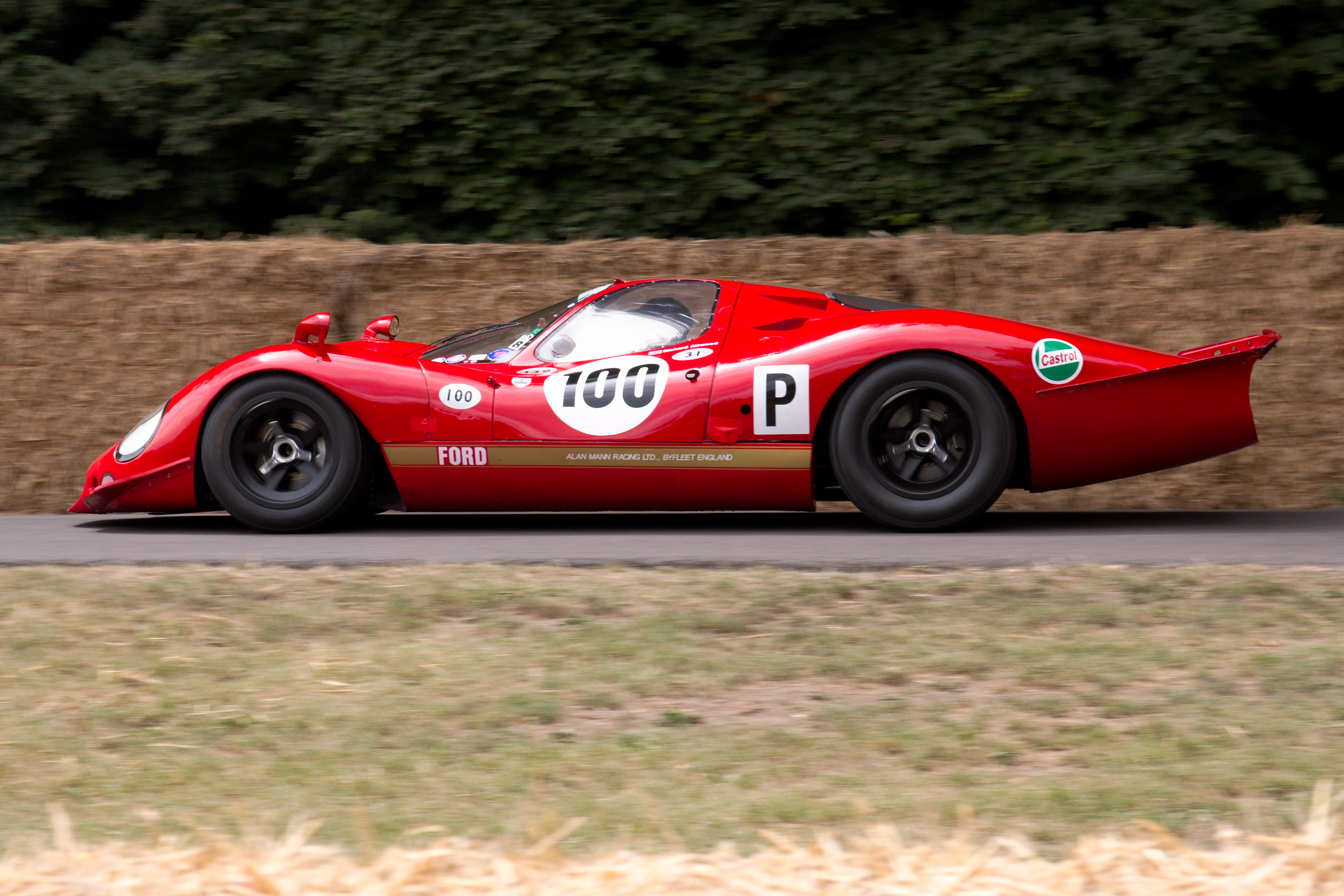
Ford P68 was fast only for short times

Up to 1966, Porsche had only entered in the two-litre class, and for 1968 developed the 3-litre Porsche 908 which had teething problems, just like the Ford P68, so most wins for Zuffenhausen came with the underpowered 2.2-litre Porsche 907. Also, the Alfa Romeo Tipo 33/2 in early 1968 had only 2000cc, not enough to win races. As a result, and with only 5 of 10 races counting towards the championship, the 1968 International Championship for Makes was won by JWAE (John Willment Automotive Engineering) in conjunction with Gulf Oil. Although records state it is Ford, as the Ford GT40, which was introduced in 1964, was the main basis for the cars construction. For the 1968 season, three "lightweight" GT40's were built to compete for the 1968 season using information, and materials learned from their first internally built race car, the Mirage M1, including a reconfigured front bulkhead, wider wheel arches front and rear, and carbon fiber. After being uncompetitive in the early rounds in the USA at Daytona and Sebring, they would win five races including its most prestigious and also last round, Le Mans, which had been postponed from the usual mid-June date to late September due to political unrest.

Porsche also scored five wins, but the 500km "short" race at Zeltweg was only awarded half points, and with only four full-point wins and four second places in nine full-point events, Porsche came second in the WSC with 42 points to Fords 45, as 25.5 points were discarded, compared to Fords 6, scored with 3rd places at Nürburgring and Zeltweg. Porsche's only non-top-two-finish came at the third-to-last round, 6h at Watkins Glen, where no less than four factory 908 were entered in an all-in attempt to secure the championship ahead of the insignificant half-point Zeltweg and the all-important Le Mans. Siffert took pole position ahead of Ickx, but after three 908 were out and the fourth limped to 6th place, two private old 906E were ahead of the factory, behind two GT40 and even a gasturbine-powered Howmet TX which was rated at 2960 cm^{3} and thus allowed as a prototype.

The International Cup for GT Cars was won by Porsche entering the Porsche 911.

== Schedule ==
Rnd	Race	Circuit or Location	Date
1	(United States) 24 Hours of Daytona	Daytona International Speedway	3 February; 4 February
2	(United States) 12 Hours of Sebring	Sebring International Raceway	23 March
3	(United Kingdom) BOAC 500 (6 Hours)^{†}	Brands Hatch	7 April
4	(Italy) 1000km Monza	Autodromo Nazionale Monza	25 April
5	(Italy) Targa Florio	Circuito delle Madonie	5 May
6	(Germany) 1000km Nürburgring	Nürburgring	19 May
7	(Belgium) 1000km Spa	Circuit de Spa-Francorchamps	26 May
8	(United States) Watkins Glen 6 Hours	Watkins Glen International	14 July
9	(Austria) 500km of Zeltweg^{†}	Zeltweg Airfield	25 August
10	(France) 24 Hours of Le Mans	Circuit de la Sarthe	28 September; 29 September^{‡}

† - These races were contested by Sports Prototypes and Sports Cars only. GT cars did not participate.

‡ - The 24 Hours of Le Mans was originally scheduled to be run 15 June and 16, but was delayed due to a workers strike in France.

== Season results ==
=== Races ===
Rnd	Circuit	Winning team	GT Winning Team	Results
Rnd	Circuit	Winning drivers	GT Winning Drivers	Results
1	Daytona	(Germany) #54 Porsche Engineering	(United States) #31 Sunray DX Oil Company	Results
1	Daytona	(United Kingdom) Vic Elford (Germany) Jochen Neerpasch	(United States) Jerry Grant (United States) Dave Morgan	Results
2	Sebring	(Germany) #49 Porsche Engineering	(United States) #3 Sunray DX Oil Company	Results
2	Sebring	(Switzerland) Jo Siffert (Germany) Hans Herrmann	(United States) Hap Sharp (United States) Dave Morgan	Results
3	Brands Hatch	(United Kingdom) #4 J.W. Automotive	None	Results
3	Brands Hatch	(Belgium) Jacky Ickx (United Kingdom) Brian Redman		Results
4	Monza	(United Kingdom) #40 J.W. Automotive	(Germany) #68 IGFA	Results
4	Monza	(Australia) Paul Hawkins (United Kingdom) David Hobbs	(Germany) Dieter Glemser (Germany) Helmut Kelleners	Results
5	Targa Florio	(Germany) #224 Porsche Engineering	(Switzerland) #82 Ecurie Les Corsaires	Results
5	Targa Florio	(United Kingdom) Vic Elford (Italy) Umberto Maglioli	(Switzerland) Claude Haldi (Switzerland) Pierre Greub (Switzerland) Edgar Berney	Results
6	Nürburgring	(Germany) #2 Porsche Engineering	(Germany) #110 Sepp Greger	Results
6	Nürburgring	(Switzerland) Jo Siffert (United Kingdom) Vic Elford	(Germany) Sepp Greger (Germany) Malte Huth	Results
7	Spa-Francorchamps	(United Kingdom) #33 J.W. Automotive	(Germany) #63 IGFA	Results
7	Spa-Francorchamps	(Belgium) Jacky Ickx (United Kingdom) Brian Redman	(Germany) Dieter Glemser (Germany) Helmut Kelleners	Results
8	Watkins Glen	(United Kingdom) #5 J.W. Automotive	(United States) #59 Brumos Porsche	Results
8	Watkins Glen	(Belgium) Jacky Ickx (Belgium) Lucien Bianchi	(United States) Peter Gregg (United States) Bert Everett	Results
9	Zeltweg	(Germany) #1 Porsche Engineering	None	Results
9	Zeltweg	(Switzerland) Jo Siffert		Results
10	Le Mans	(United Kingdom) #9 J.W. Automotive	(Belgium) #43 Jean-Pierre Gaban	Results
10	Le Mans	(Mexico) Pedro Rodriguez (Belgium) Lucien Bianchi	(Belgium) Jean-Pierre Gaban (Belgium) Roger van der Schrick	Results

== Manufacturers Championships ==
=== International Championship for Makes ===
As Round 9 Zeltweg 500km was awarded only half points due to its short distance, and only the best 5 round results for each make counted towards the championship, only 9 of 10 rounds were actually significant. Only the best 5 round results for each make counted towards the championship, with any other points earned

Points were awarded for overall placings gained by the top 6 finishers from Groups 6, 4 & 3 at each round in the order of 9-6-4-3-2-1. Manufacturers were only given points for their highest finishing car; any other cars from that manufacturer were skipped in the points standings, but could prevent other manufacturers from scoring these points.

Cars from other than Groups 6, 4 & 3 were ignored in the awarding of points for the overall championship.

Relinquished points are shown within brackets, they are not included in the total.

Pos	Manufacturer	Rd 1	Rd 2	Rd 3	Rd 4	Rd 5	Rd 6	Rd 7	Rd 8	Rd 9^{†}	Rd 10	Total
1	(United States) Ford			9	9		(4)	9	9	(2)	9	45
2	(Germany) Porsche	9	9	6	(6)	9	9	(6)	(3)	(4.5)	(6)	42
3	(Italy) Alfa Romeo	3				6	2			1.5	3	15.5
4=	(United States) Chevrolet		4									4
4=	(United States) Howmet								4			4
4=	(France) Alpine-Renault				4							4
7	(Italy) Ferrari			2								2
8	(United Kingdom) Lola			1								1

=== International Cup for GT Cars ===
Points were awarded for Group placings gained by the top six GT finishers at each round in the order of 9-6-4-3-2-1. Manufacturers were only given points for their highest finishing car; any other cars from that manufacturer were merely skipped in the points standings.

Only the best 5 round results for each make counted towards the title, with any other points earned not included in the total. Relinquished points are shown within brackets.

The GT class did not participate in Rounds 3 and 9.

Pos	Manufacturer	Rd 1	Rd 2	Rd 4	Rd 5	Rd 6	Rd 7	Rd 8	Rd 10	Total
1	(Germany) Porsche	(6)	(6)	9	9	9	9	9	(9)	45
2	(United States) Chevrolet	9	9					6		24
3	(United Kingdom) MG		1	2			6			9
4	(Italy) Lancia				4					4
5	(Italy) Fiat			1						1

== Car Details ==
The following models contributed to the nett points totals of their respective manufacturers.

=== International Championship for Makes ===
- Ford GT40
- Porsche 907 & 908
- Alfa Romeo T33/2
- Alpine A211 Renault
- Chevrolet Corvette
- Howmet TX Continental
- Ferrari 250LM
- Lola T70 Mk3 Chevrolet

=== International Cup for GT Cars ===
- Porsche 911S & 911T
- Chevrolet Corvette
- MGB & MGBGT
- Lancia Fulvia Sport
- Fiat Dino
