= Zeltweg Air Base =

Austrian airbase and former race track

Zeltweg Air Base Fliegerhorst Hinterstoisser
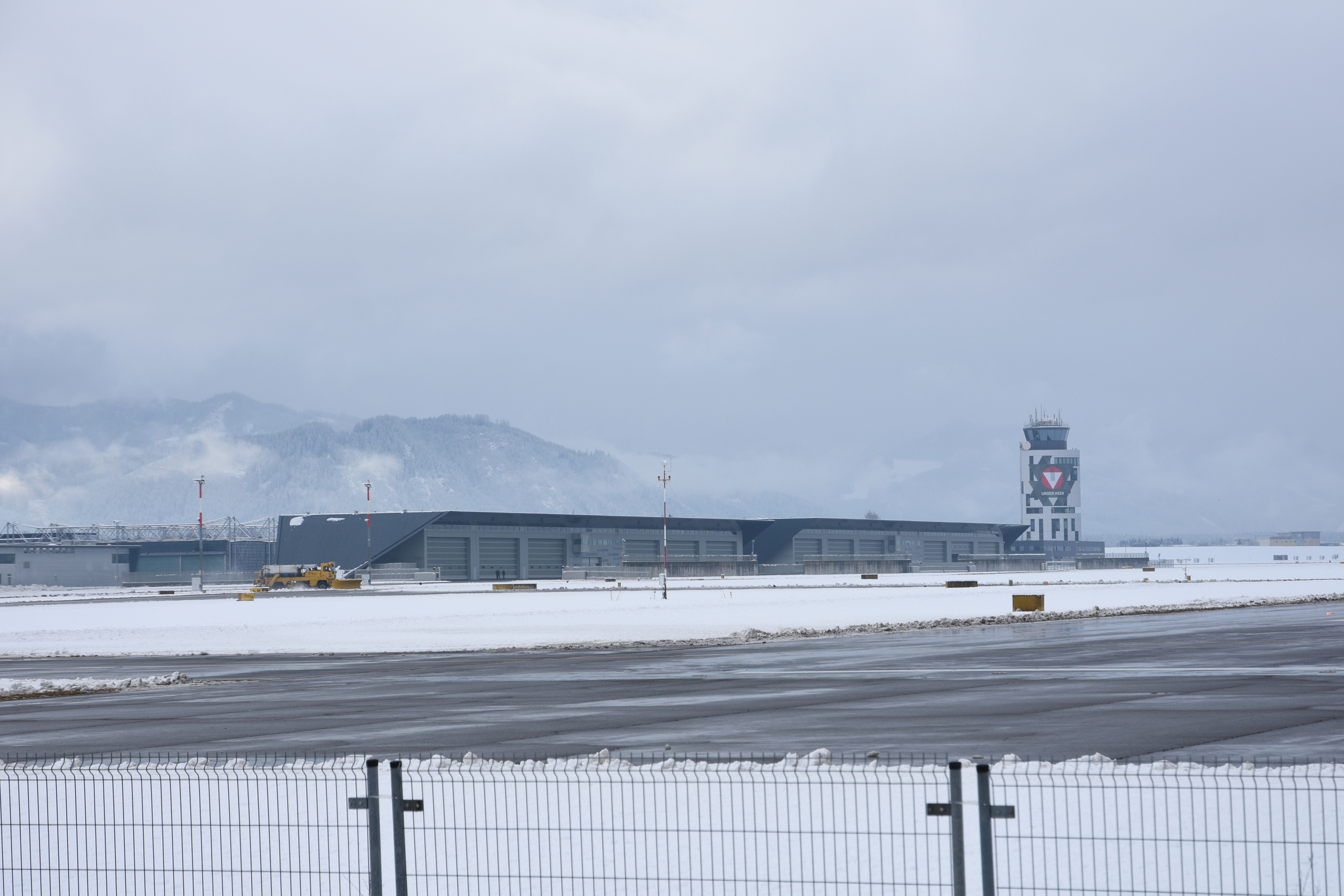
- IATA: none; ICAO: LOXZ

Summary
- Location: Austria
- Elevation AMSL: 2,238 ft / 682 m
- Coordinates: 47°12′8″N 14°44′32″E

Map
- Location of Fliegerhorst Hinterstoisser in Austria

Runways
Direction	Length		Surface
Direction	m	ft	Surface
08/26	2,750	9,022	Asphalt
08L/26R	1,100	3,609	Grass
- Source: Landings.com

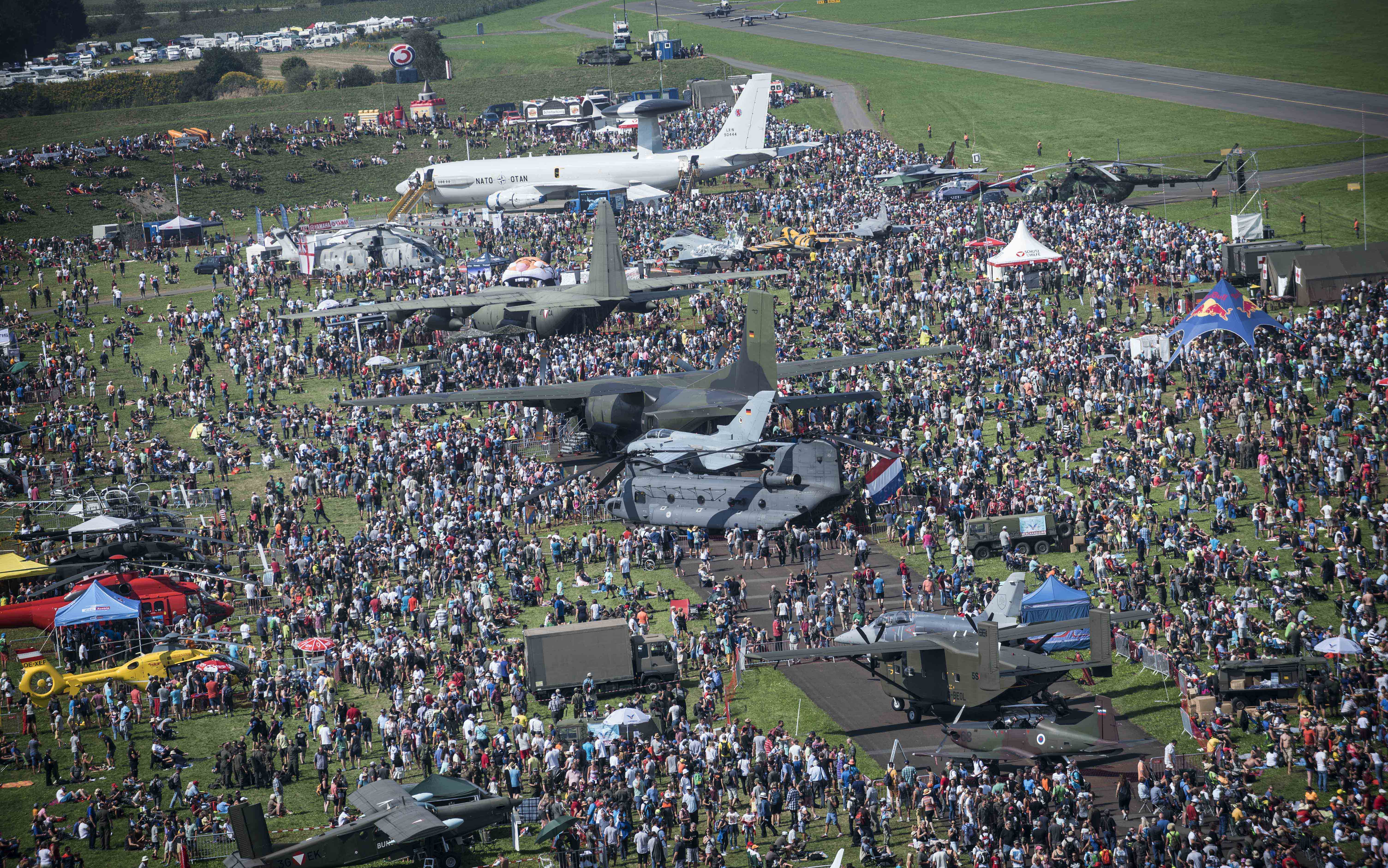
Crowds at Zeltweg Air Base for Airpower 2016

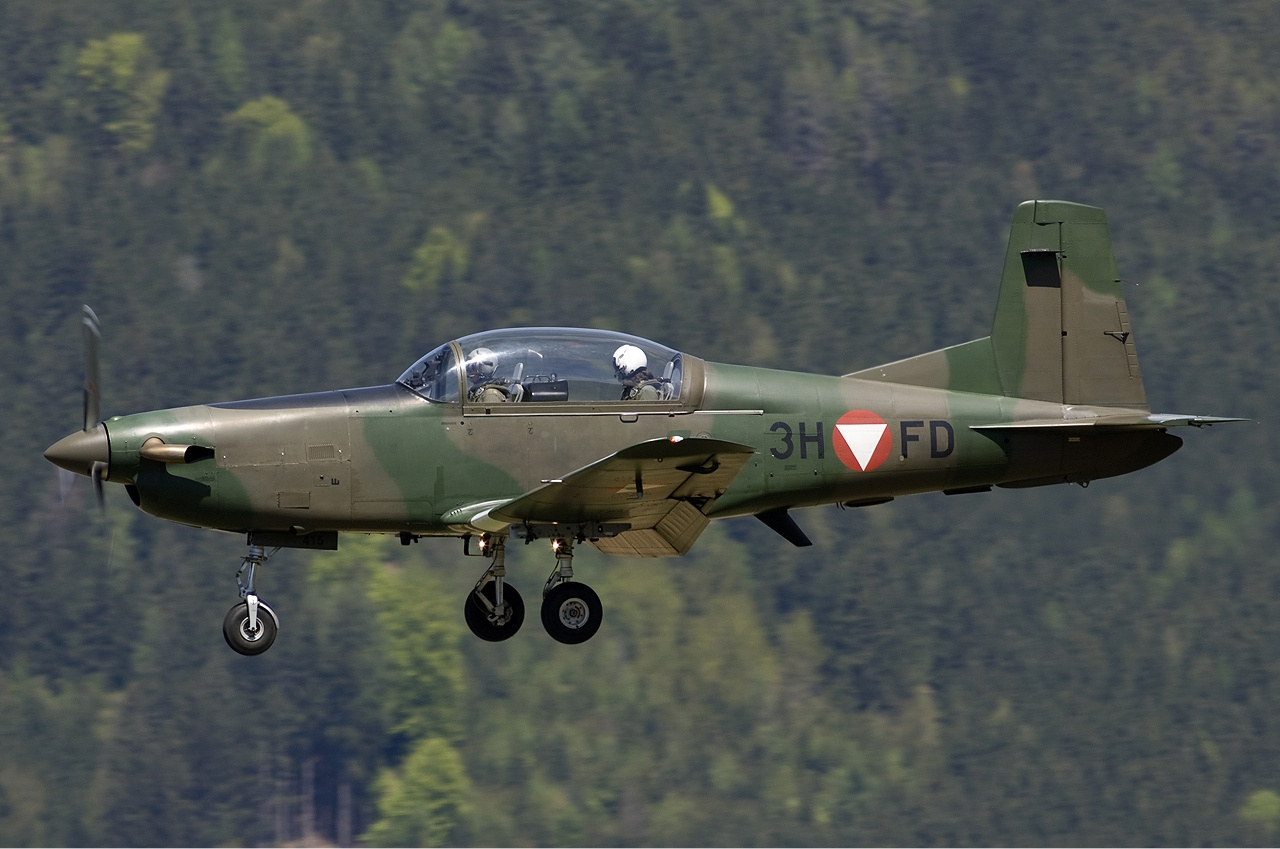
Pilatus PC-7, Zeltweg, 2008

Zeltweg Air Base, known in German as Fliegerhorst Hinterstoisser, is a military airfield in Styria, Austria near Zeltweg. It is the main airfield of the Austrian Air Force. It was also used as a motor racing circuit in the 1960s.

== History ==
Zeltweg Air Base has been home to the Austrian Air Force's Surveillance Squadron since 1976, operating a variety of jet types, including Saab 35OE Draken until 2005, Northrop F-5E Tiger II, and Eurofighter Typhoons since 2007.

It is also a base for training aircraft, such as the Saab 91 Safir (retired 1992), the Pilatus PC-7 (12 in service, since 1984) and the Diamond DA 40NG (4, since 2018).

== AirPower air show ==
Since 1997, the AirPower show is held at Zeltweg. The 2003 and 2005 editions featured Red Bull Air Race events. The show was held in 1997, 2000, 2003, 2005, 2009, 2011, 2013, 2016 and 2019. It is scheduled to be held again in 2022.

Franz Hinterstoisser, after whom the airfield was named, was an early pioneer of Austrian aviation (1863-1933).

== Zeltweg Military Aviation Museum ==
Hangar 8 of Hinterstoisser Air Base is home to the "Zeltweg Military Aviation Museum" (Militärluftfahrtmuseum Zeltweg), a branch of the Vienna Museum of Military History (Heeresgeschichtliches Museum). The collection includes over 25 historic aircraft, and associated military equipment.

Aircraft on display include;

- Aérospatiale Alouette III helicopter
- Agusta-Bell 204 helicopter
- De Havilland DH.115 Vampire
- Fouga CM.170 Magister
- Mikoyan-Gurevich MiG-21R (Yugoslav AF)
- Saab J29F
- Saab 35OE Draken
- Saab 105 jet trainer
- Short SC.7 Skyvan
- Yakovlev Yak-18 - the first aircraft to enter service with the Austrian Armed Forces of the Second Republic
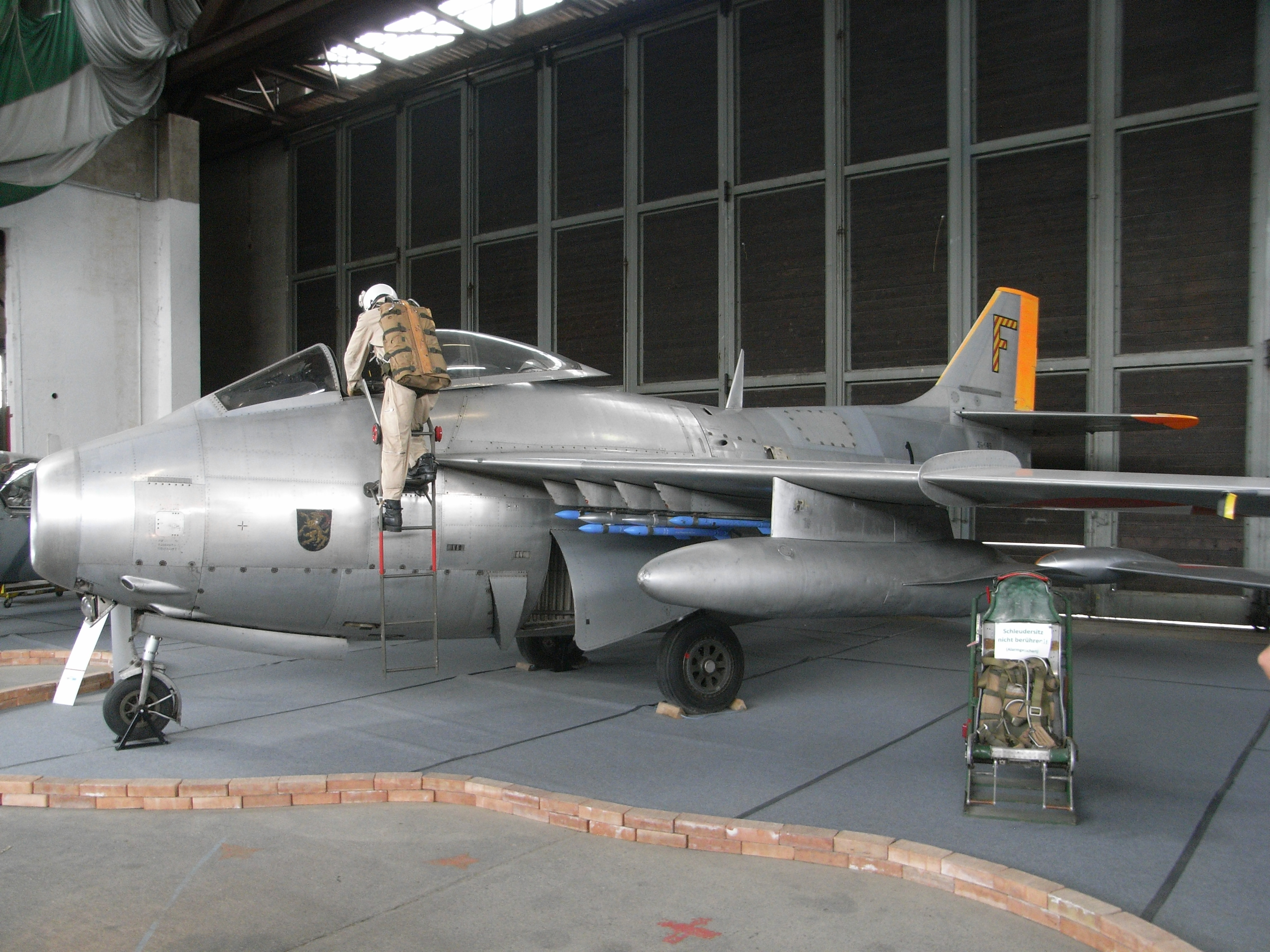
Saab J29F

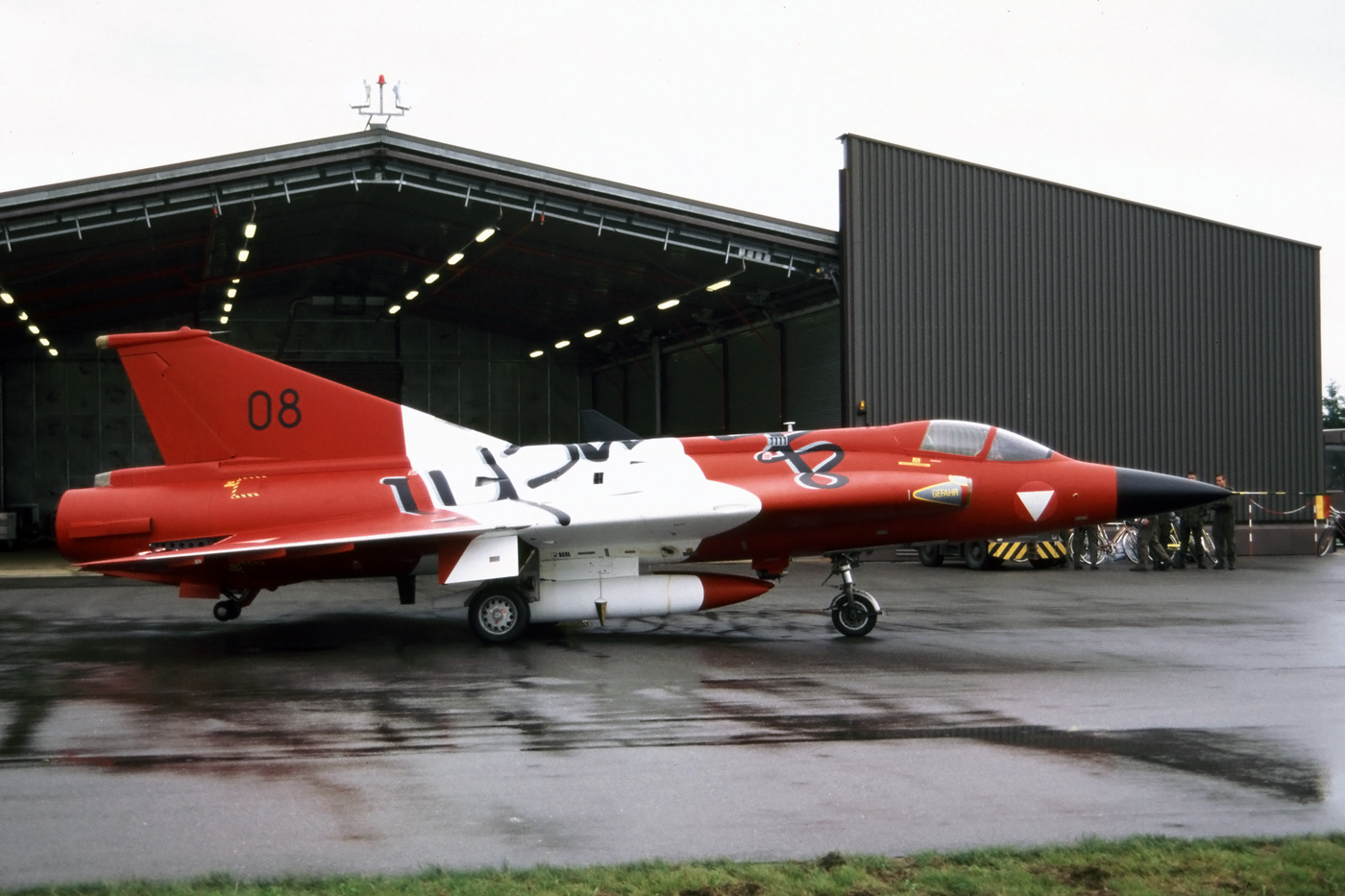
Saab 35OE Draken

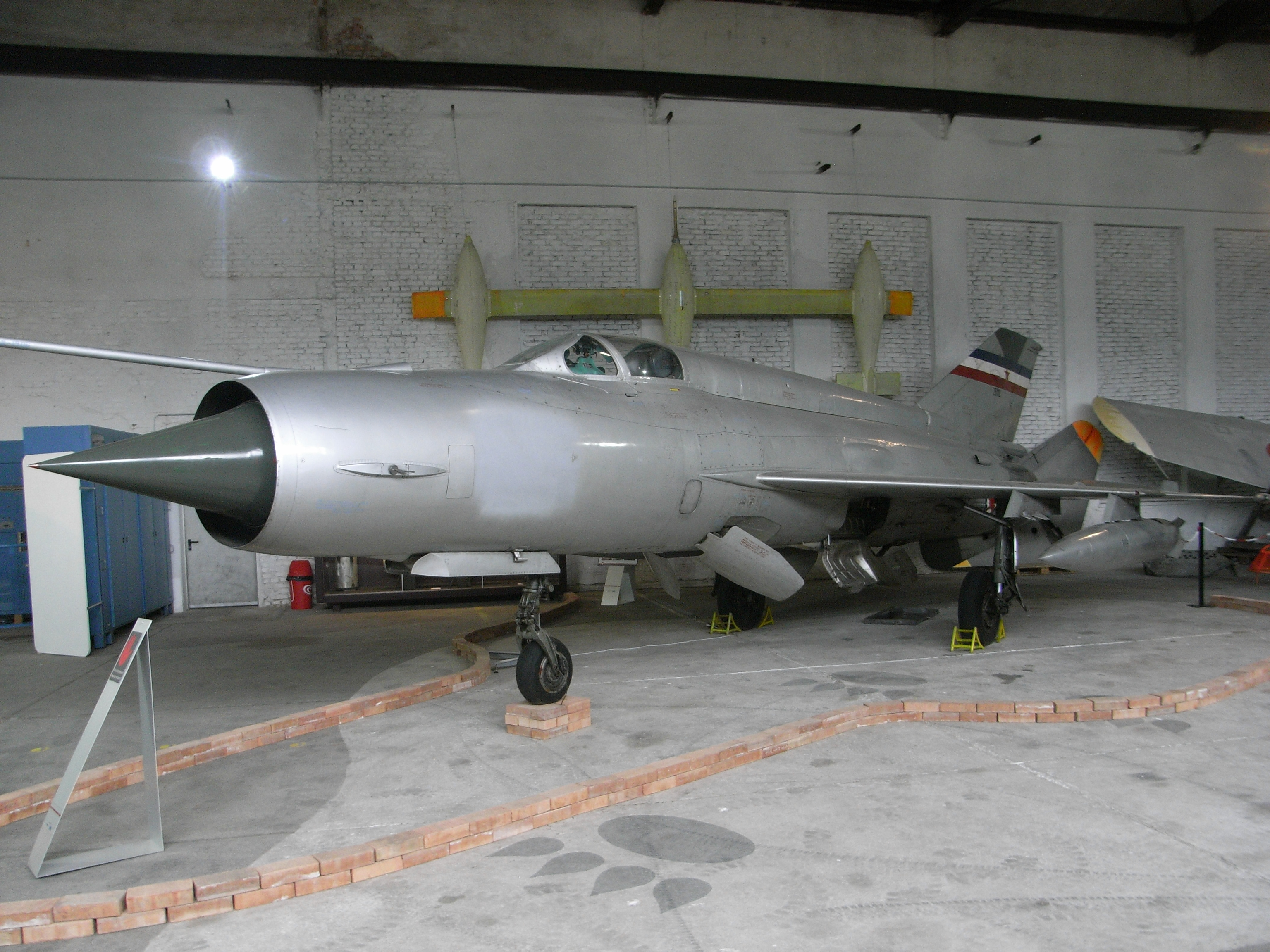
MIG 21R

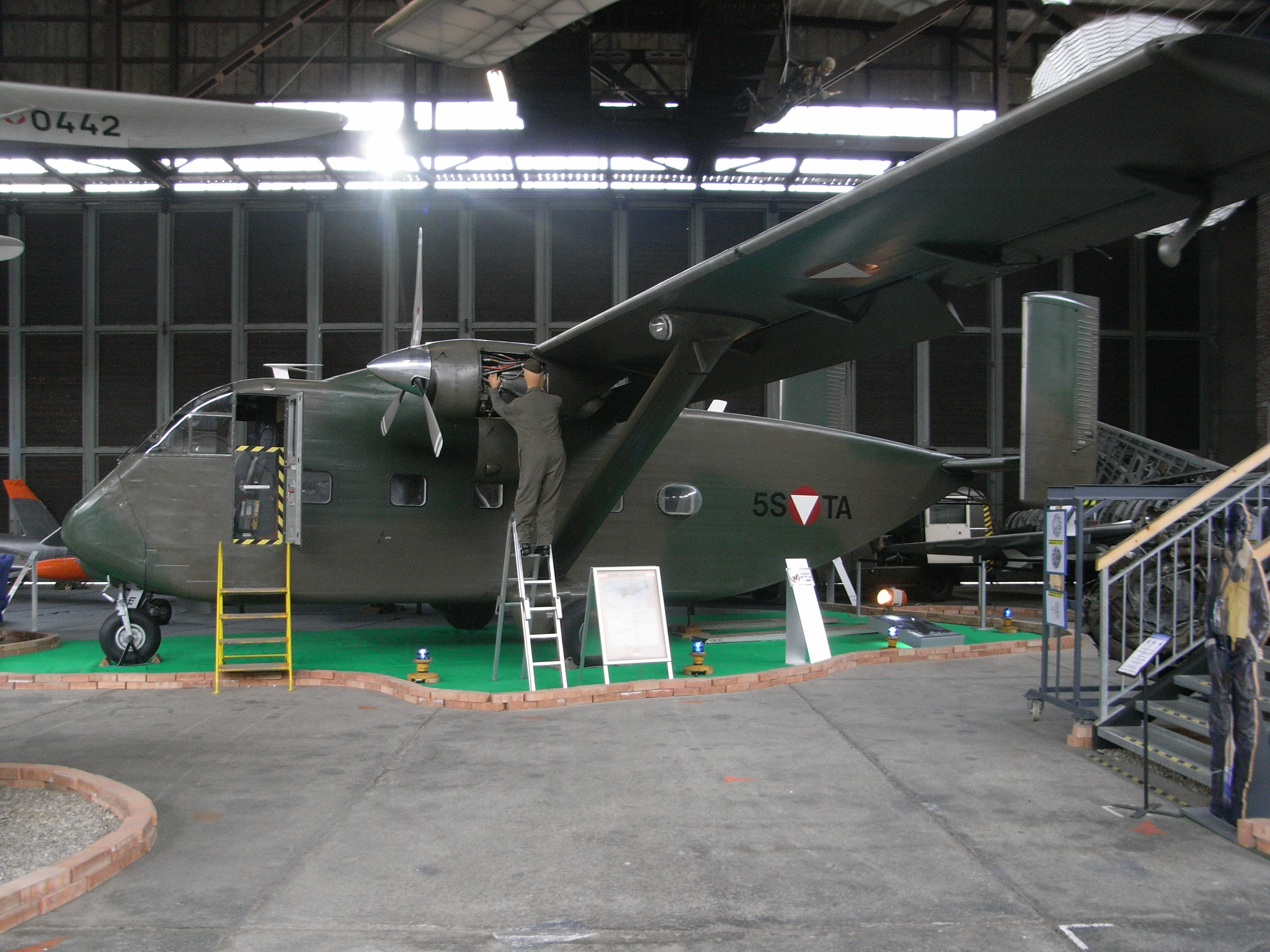
Skyvan SC-7

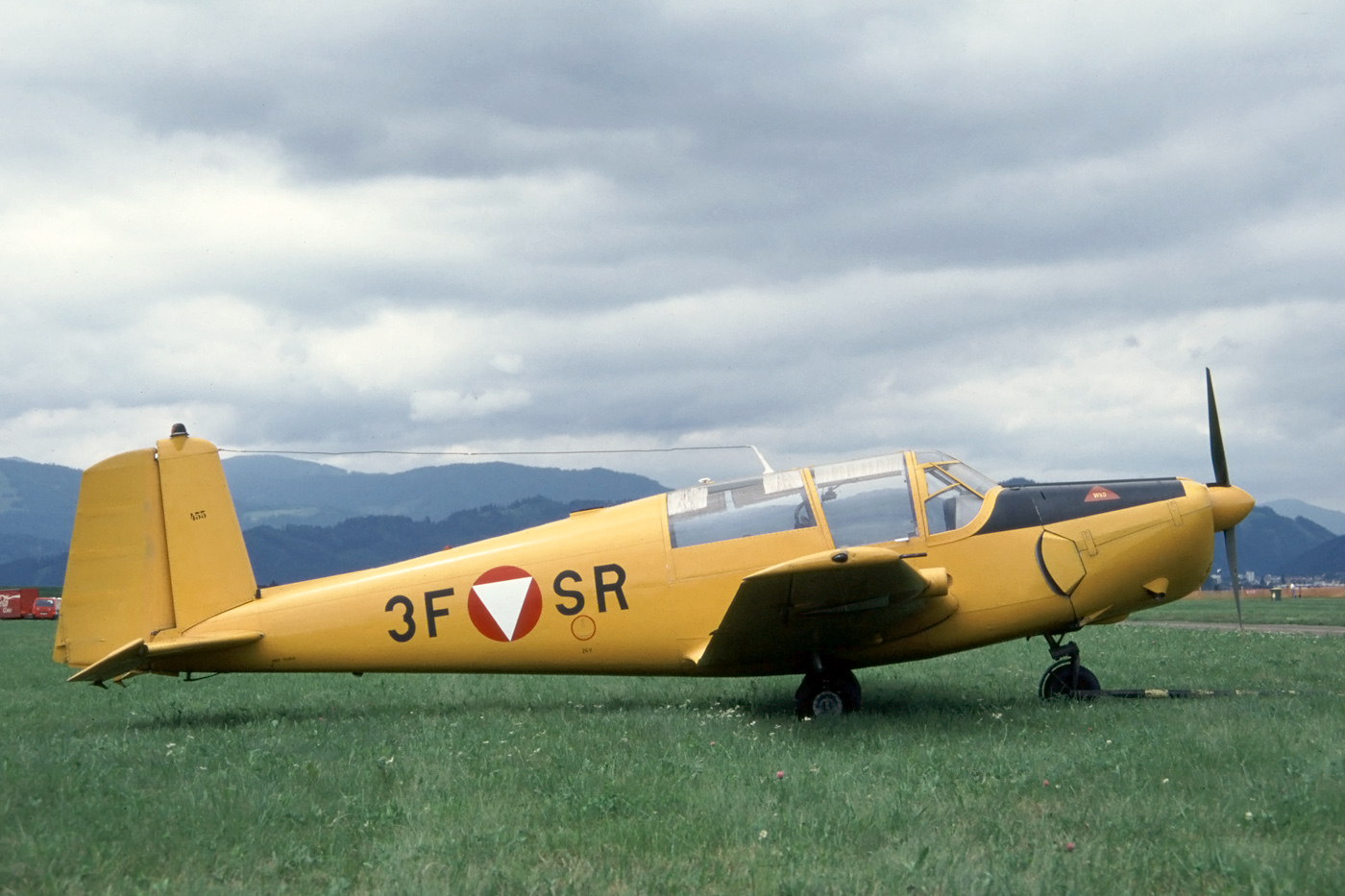
Saab 91 Safir (now preserved at Zeltweg Museum)

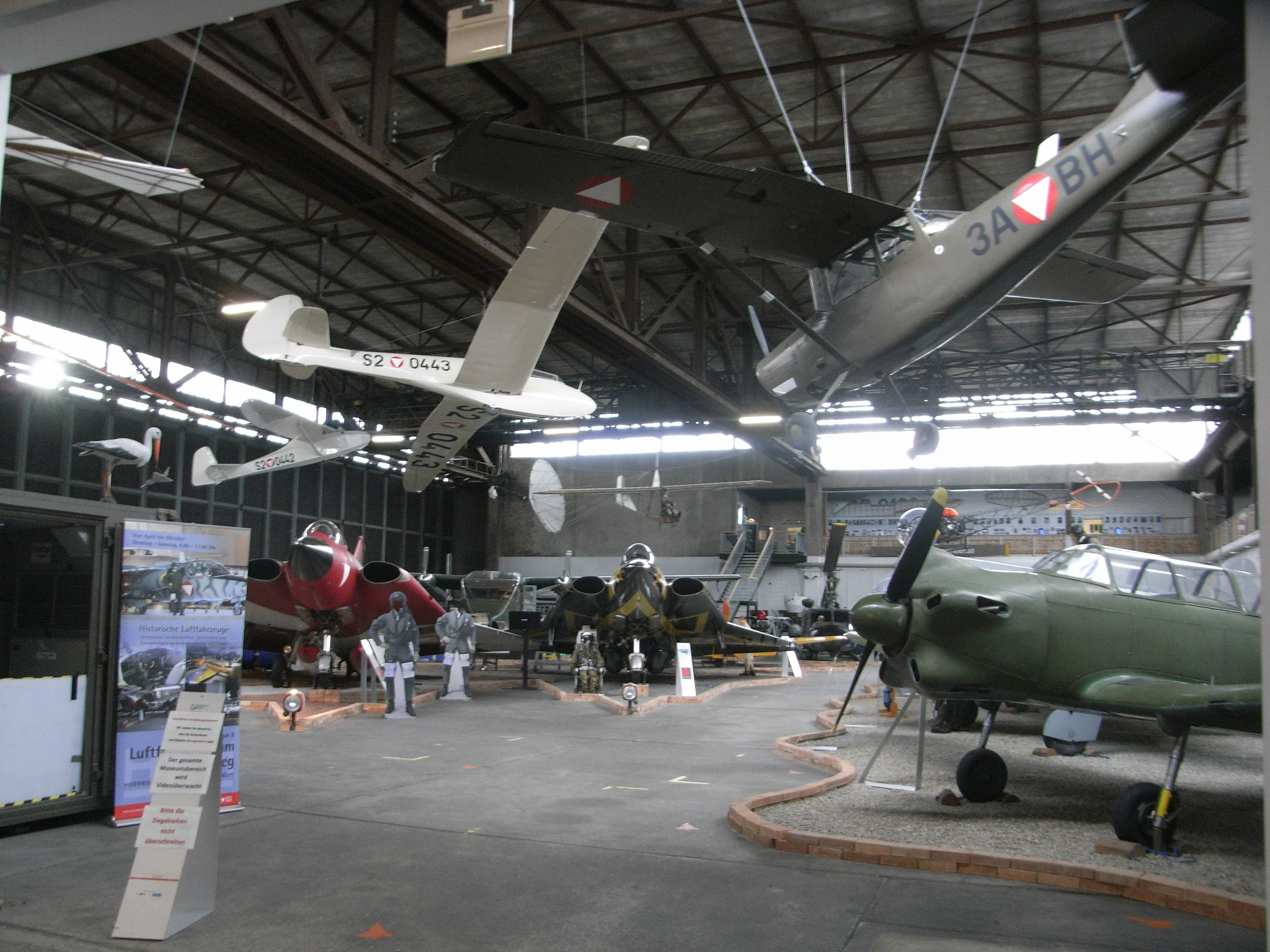
General view of museum

== Motorsports ==
Zeltweg
- Grand Prix Circuit (1957–1968)
- Location: Zeltweg, Styria, Austria
- Opened: 6 October 1957; 68 years ago
- Closed: 25 August 1968; 57 years ago
- Major events: World Sportscar Championship 500km of Zeltweg (1966–1968); Formula One Austrian Grand Prix (1964)

Grand Prix Circuit (1957–1968)
- Length: 3.186 km (1.980 mi)
- Turns: 4
- Race lap record: 1:04.820 ( (Switzerland) Jo Siffert, Porsche 908, 1968, Group 6)

Built in 1957 in Styria, the idea for the track came from the United Kingdom's success at Silverstone Circuit, also built on the site of an airfield. However, the track engineers at Zeltweg failed to take into account the abrasive nature of the surface. A lone Formula One World Championship Grand Prix was held in 1964. The World Sportscar Championship Zeltweg 500 Kilometres was held later, until the track was abandoned in 1969 following the construction of the purpose-built Österreichring nearby at Kattigar.

=== Lap records ===
The Formula 1 lap record on the Zeltweg Airfield circuit is 1:10.560 by Dan Gurney in a Brabham BT7, while the overall lap record is 1:04.820 and was set by Jo Siffert in a Porsche 908 during the 1968 Zeltweg 500 Kilometres. The fastest official race lap records at the Zeltweg Air Base are listed as:

Category	Time	Driver	Vehicle	Event
Grand Prix Circuit (1957–1968): 3.186 km (1.980 mi)
Group 6	1:04.820	Jo Siffert	Porsche 908	1968 500km of Zeltweg
Group 4	1:09.400	Denny Hulme (Note: Both drivers took the same lap time independently.); Paul Hawkins	Ford GT40	1967 Sports Car Grand Prix Österrich
Formula One	1:10.560	Dan Gurney	Brabham BT7	1964 Austrian Grand Prix
Formula Two	1:16.000	Stirling Moss	Porsche 718	1960 Flugplatzrennen
