= Giovanni Alberti =

Giovanni Alberti may refer to:

- Giovanni Alberti (painter) (1558–1601), Italian painter
- Giovanni Alberti (mathematician) (born 1965), Italian mathematician
- Giovanni Alberti (1917–2019), Italian automobile racing driver
