= 1968 Targa Florio =

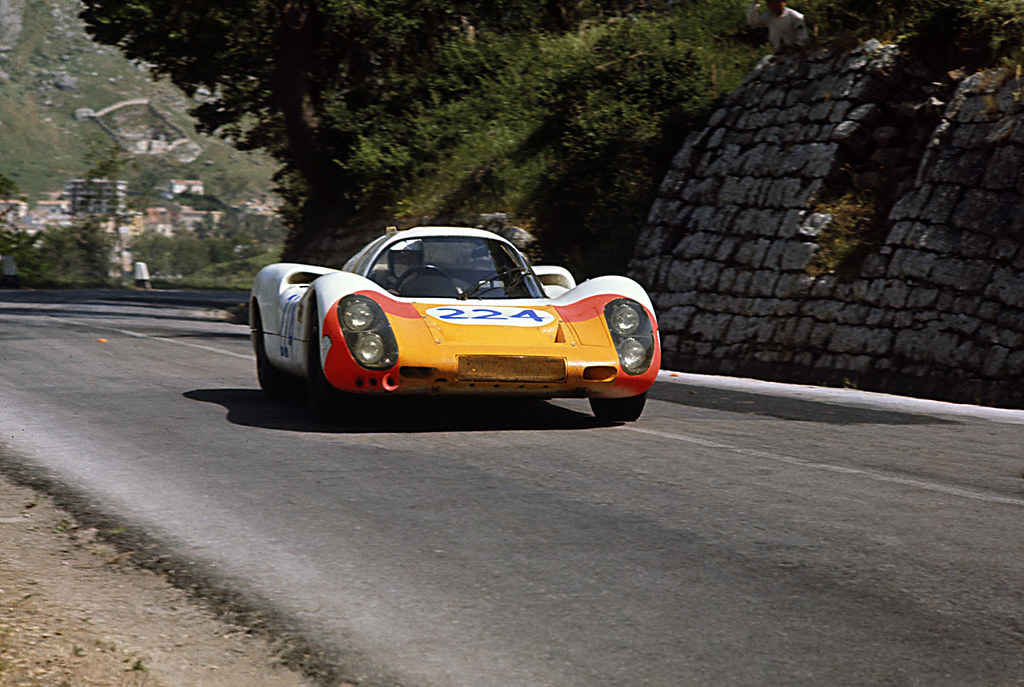
The winning Porsche 907 #224 of Elford/Maglioli

The 52° Targa Florio took place on 5 May 1968, on the Circuito Piccolo delle Madonie, Sicily (Italy).

== Race ==
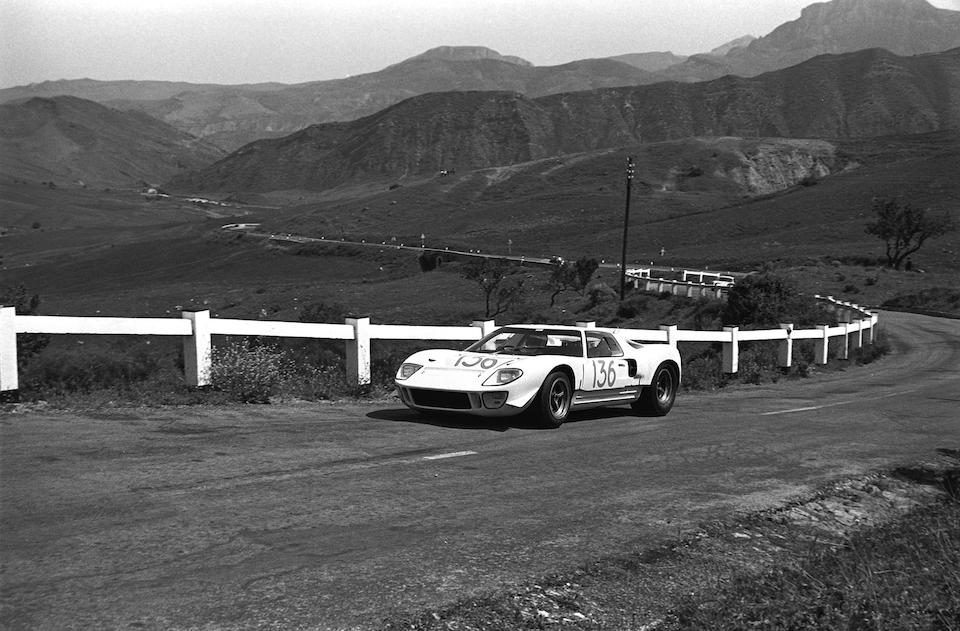
The Ford GT40 #136 of Drury/Sanger. They did not finish the race.

The event was marked by the absence of Scuderia Ferrari which skipped the whole 1968 World Sportscar Championship in protest of the regulation change imposed by the FIA. Autodelta thus filled the vacuum left by Ferrari by deploying the new Alfa Romeo Tipo 33/2 in place of the Tipo 33 of the previous year. Porsche responded by replacing the 910 with the new 907. Alfa Romeo also offered a seat to Nino Vaccarella who was "orphaned" by Ferrari’s absence, by providing the Sicilian with a 33/2 with an enlarged 2.5L engine.

Though Vaccarella had to retire during the third lap for an accident, the 33/2 proved to be a match for the 907. The real protagonist of the race was Vic Elford: during the first lap his 907 lost a wheel, and shortly later the car also suffered a tire puncture, accumulating so many minutes from the lead that he considered the race lost and rather concentrated on beating the circuit lap record as a consolation. Taking advantage of his experience as a rally driver, he started drifting whenever possible. As a result not only he set lap records more than once, but also considerably reduced the gap from the top of the race. In the end, he decided to let his companion Umberto Maglioli driving only for three out of ten laps, and aimed for the victory. He overtook the leading 33/2 during the 9th lap and won the race by 3 minutes.

== Official results ==
Pos	Class	No	Team	Drivers	Chassis	Laps
1	P 3.0	224	(Germany) Porsche System Engineering	(England) Vic Elford (Italy) Umberto Maglioli	Porsche 907 2.2	10
2	P 2.0	186	(Italy) Autodelta	(Italy) Ignazio Giunti (Italy) Nanni Galli	Alfa Romeo Tipo 33/2	10
3	P 2.0	192	(Italy) Autodelta	(Italy) Mario Casoni (Belgium) Lucien Bianchi	Alfa Romeo Tipo 33/2	10

World Sportscar Championship
Previous race: 1000 km Monza	1968 season	Next race: 1000 km Nurburgring
