= Matra Sports V12 engine =

Matra racing V12 engine

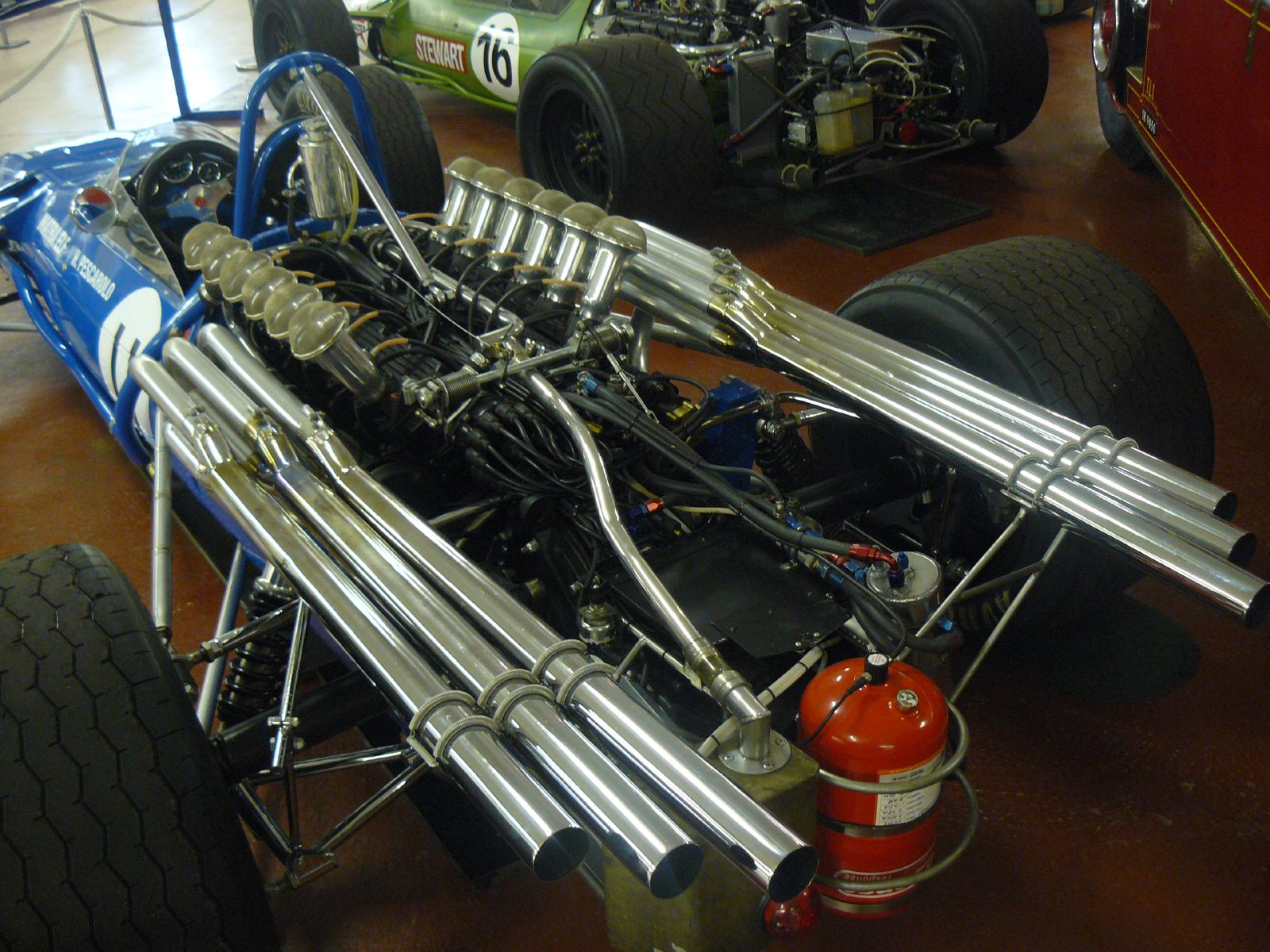
- Matra MS9 V12 engine in MS11 F1 car

Overview
- Manufacturer: (France) Matra
- Designer: Georges Martin
- Production: 1968–1982

Layout
- Displacement: 2993 cc
- Cylinder bore: 79.7 mm
- Piston stroke: 50 mm
- Cylinder block material: Aluminum
- Cylinder head material: Aluminum
- Valvetrain: Gear driven DOHC, 4 valves × cyl.
- Compression ratio: 11:1

Combustion
- Oil system: Dry sump
- Cooling system: Water-cooled

Output
- Power output: 450 bhp (336 kW) at 11,000 rpm
- Torque output: 343 N⋅m (253 lbf⋅ft) at 8,000 rpm

Dimensions
- Dry weight: 168 kg (370 lb)

The Matra Sports V12 engine is a family of automotive internal combustion engines built for Formula One (F1) and sports car endurance racing. Cars powered by versions of the engine won at the 24 Hours of Le Mans in 1972, 1973, and 1974, and gave Matra the World Championship for Makes title in 1973 and 1974. The Matra Sports V12 is also remembered for its distinctive sound.

== History ==
Starting with the 1966 season, F1's governing body, the Fédération Internationale de l'Automobile (FIA), raised the displacement limit for naturally aspirated cars to 3.0-litres.

Georges Martin was a French engineer who joined Matra at the end of 1966 at the invitation of Philippe Guédon, a former colleague of his at Simca. Jean-Luc Lagardère, Matra's CEO, informed Martin that his first project would be to design an engine for the new F1 rules with a specific output target of 150 horsepower per litre. Lagardère had already determined that the new engine would be a V12.

Work on the Matra Sports V12 began in 1967. The project was underwritten by a loan of six million francs from the French government (approximately US$1,200,000), and, after Lagardère met with Jean Prada, head what became the French oil company Elf Aquitaine in April of 1967, an additional two million francs (US$400,000).

Development took place in Matra's base in Vélizy-Villacoublay. Leading the effort were Martin and his colleague Georges Chariatte. René Fortin was responsible for testing and development.

Martin quietly negotiated an agreement with British Racing Motors (BRM) for the British firm to design a considerable portion of the engine, including the camshafts, cam drives, and tappets, among other items, while Martin and his team would design the cylinder heads and combustion chamber shapes. This arrangement fell apart after Sir Alfred Owen, Chairman of Rubery Owen and head of BRM, disclosed BRM's involvement in designing the engine for the new "all French" F1 car at a British motor industry dinner. BRM's contract was cancelled, and Matra continued work with French engineering firm and engine specialist Moteur Moderne.

Moteur Moderne was contracted to produce three prototype engines. The cylinder blocks for the prototype engines were made of aluminum, while the production block, and possibly the cylinder heads, were to be of magnesium. Production of the first test engine took only seven months, and the V12 was first fired up on a test bench on 19 December 1967.

Matra planned to unveil a V12-powered road car in 1971. A later model MS81 V12 was installed in an extensively modified Matra Murena by the factory.

Beginning in the 1972 season, the Commission Sportive Internationale (CSI) amended the rules for sports prototypes by combining the previous Group 5 and Group 6 classes into a single new Group 5 class with no minimum production requirement and a maximum displacement limit of 3.0-litres, eliminating the 5.0-litre cars that had raced in earlier seasons, and opening a new competition venue for the Matra V12.

== Common features ==
All members of the Matra Sports V12 family are water-cooled, four-stroke V12 engines with an included angle of 60° between cylinder banks. All engines in the family also have the same bore × stroke dimensions of 79.7 mm × 50 mm (3.14 in × 1.97 in), and total displacement of 2,993 cc (182.6 cu in). The block and cylinder heads are of light alloy. The block uses wet liners in the cylinder bores. The crankshaft has six throws and seven main bearings, and is machined from a solid billet. The engine has two overhead camshafts per cylinder bank driven by a straight-cut geartrain, and four valves per cylinder.

Over the life of the engine family, outputs for individual versions ranged from 395–520 hp (295–388 kW; 400–527 PS), and 198–253 lb⋅ft (268–343 N⋅m) of torque.

== Variants ==
=== MS9 ===
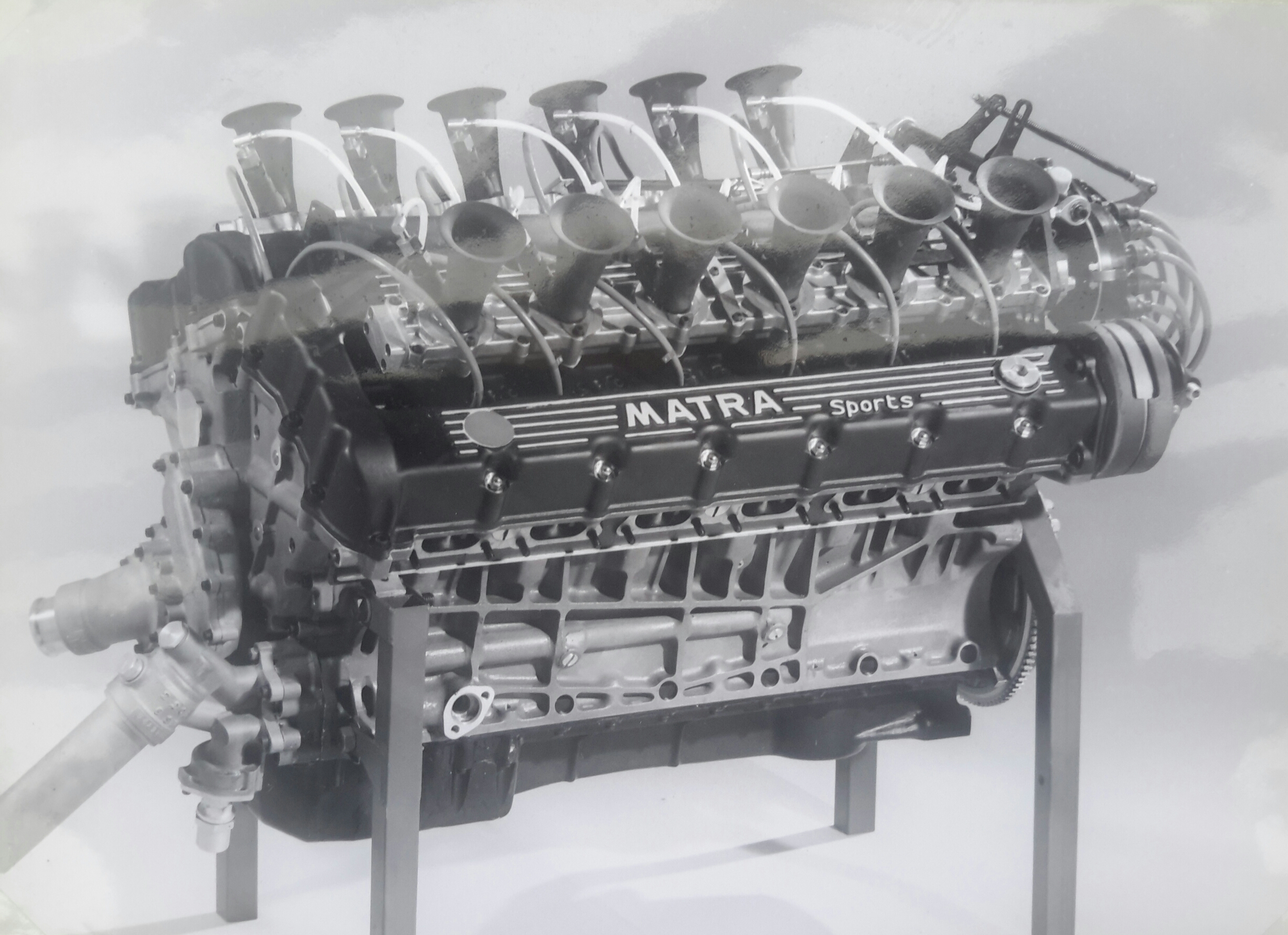
Matra Sports MS9 V12

The MS9 was the first model of the Matra Sports V12 to race. Its intake ports are placed between the camshafts on each cylinder head, so that the intake trumpet above each port angled outward on an assembled engine. Some models also had a "pipe organ" exhaust system consisting of a trio of long straight pipes running down each side of the engine.

The included angle between the valves is 56°, raising the height of the combustion chamber and requiring a high dome on the piston to achieve the desired compression ratio.

Unlike the Cosworth DFV, the MS9 was not designed to be a load-bearing part of the car's structure.

The MS9 produced 395 PS (291 kW) at 10,500 rpm. It was presented to motoring journalists on 11 January 1968 at Vélizy-Villacoublay.

Applications:

- Matra MS11
- Matra-Simca MS630
- Matra MS640
- Matra MS650

=== MS12 ===
The MS12 engine was the result of a significant redesign of Matra's V12 engine. A single-cylinder test engine was built by Moteur Moderne to experiment with combustion chamber design. When the data from the test engine were applied to the V12, it resulted in an included angle of 33½° degrees between intake and exhaust valves. Valve diameters in early engines were 31 mm for intakes and 27 mm for exhausts, while on later motors these dimensions increased to 33 mm and 27.2 mm. The intake ports were moved to the side of the cylinder head, indicated by two rows of six trumpets that are mounted vertically in the vee of the cylinder block.

The oil scavenge and pressure pumps for the dry sump system were moved from their position below the crankshaft in the MS9, to the front of the crankcase below the water pump. This had the benefit of reducing the height of the engine assembly. The same 120° steel crankshaft was used as on the MS9, but there was less free space around it in the MS12, to reduce windage losses. Connecting rods were 116 mm long titanium parts, with 44 mm big ends. The pistons are flat-topped, fully-skirted forged aluminum parts.

The MS12 was designed to handle suspension loads fed into a strengthened sump and new structural members bolted to the sides of the top of each cylinder heads. The block and heads were both castings of AS9KG aluminum alloy. The heads were attached by 14 studs, with an additional 6 cap screws threaded from the block into the head on the outboard, exhaust side.

The first generation MS12 developed 435 PS (320 kW) at 11,000 rpm, and was ready for the 1970 racing season.

Applications:

- Matra MS120
- Matra MS120B
- Matra-Simca MS660
- Matra-Simca MS670
- Matra MS670B

=== MS71 ===
The next iteration of the Matra Sports V12 was the MS71, which debuted in 1971. It produced 440 PS (324 kW) at 11,000 rpm.

Applications:

- Matra MS120C
- Matra MS120D

=== MS72 ===
The MS72 went into service in 1972. Its power output is 485 PS (357 kW) at 11,800 rpm.

Applications:

- Matra MS120C
- Matra MS120D

=== MS73 ===
This engine, also called the MS12/73, saw service in both F1 and sports cars in 1975 and 1976. It developed 490 PS (360 kW) at 11,500 rpm.

Applications:

- Matra-Simca MS670
- Matra-Simca MS670B
- Matra-Simca MS670C
- Shadow DN7
- Ligier JS5

=== MS76 ===
The MS76 powered two different Ligier F1 models in 1977 and 1978. It produced 520 PS (382 kW) at 12,300 rpm.

Applications:

- Ligier JS7
- Ligier JS9

=== MS78 ===
The MS78 was the Ligier F1 team's engine for two models in 1978. Power output is 520 PS (382 kW) at 12,300 rpm.

Applications:

- Ligier JS7
- Ligier JS9

=== MS81 ===
The MS81 engine was used by a different F1 Ligier model in 1981–1982. It was also installed in a prototype road car. In racing trim it developed 520 PS (382 kW) at 13,000 rpm. It was detuned for the road car application.

Applications:

- Ligier JS17
- Matra MS V12 Prototype Murena 81

== Complete Formula One World Championship results ==
(key) (results in bold indicate pole position; results in italics indicate fastest lap)

Year	Entrants	Chassis	Engine	Tyres	Drivers	1	2	3	4	5	6	7	8	9	10	11	12	13	14	15	16	17	Points	WCC
1968	Matra Sports	Matra MS11	Matra V12	D		RSA	ESP	MON	BEL	NED	FRA	GBR	GER	ITA	CAN	USA	MEX						8	9th
1968	Matra Sports	Matra MS11	Matra V12	D	(France) Jean-Pierre Beltoise			Ret	8	2	9	Ret	Ret	5	Ret	Ret	Ret						8	9th
1968	Matra Sports	Matra MS11	Matra V12	D	(France) Henri Pescarolo										Ret	DNS	9						8	9th
1970	Equipe Matra Elf	Matra MS120	Matra V12	G		RSA	ESP	MON	BEL	NED	FRA	GBR	GER	AUT	ITA	CAN	USA	MEX					23	6th
1970	Equipe Matra Elf	Matra MS120	Matra V12	G	(France) Jean-Pierre Beltoise	4	Ret	Ret	3	5	13	Ret	Ret	6	3	8	Ret	5					23	6th
1970	Equipe Matra Elf	Matra MS120	Matra V12	G	(France) Henri Pescarolo	7	Ret	3	6	8	5	Ret	6	14	Ret	7	8	9					23	6th
1971	Equipe Matra Sports	Matra MS120B	Matra V12	G		RSA	ESP	MON	NED	FRA	GBR	GER	AUT	ITA	CAN	USA							9	7th
1971	Equipe Matra Sports	Matra MS120B	Matra V12	G	(New Zealand) Chris Amon	5	3	Ret	Ret	5	Ret	Ret		**6**	10	12							9	7th
1971	Equipe Matra Sports	Matra MS120B	Matra V12	G	(France) Jean-Pierre Beltoise		6	Ret	9	7	7				Ret	8							9	7th
1972	Equipe Matra Sports	Matra MS120C; Matra MS120D	Matra V12	G		ARG	RSA	ESP	MON	BEL	FRA	GBR	GER	AUT	ITA	CAN	USA						12	8th
1972	Equipe Matra Sports	Matra MS120C; Matra MS120D	Matra V12	G	(New Zealand) Chris Amon	Ret	15	Ret	6	6	**3**	4	15	5	Ret	6	15						12	8th
1975	UOP Shadow Racing	Shadow DN7	Matra V12	G		ARG	BRA	RSA	ESP	MON	BEL	SWE	NED	FRA	GBR	GER	AUT	ITA	USA				0	NC
1975	UOP Shadow Racing	Shadow DN7	Matra V12	G	(France) Jean-Pierre Jarier												Ret	Ret					0	NC
1976	Ligier Gitanes	Ligier JS5	Matra V12	G		BRA	RSA	USW	ESP	BEL	MON	SWE	FRA	GBR	GER	AUT	NED	ITA	CAN	USA	JPN		20	6th
1976	Ligier Gitanes	Ligier JS5	Matra V12	G	(France) Jacques Laffite	Ret	Ret	4	12	3	12	4	14	DSQ	Ret	2	Ret	**3**	Ret	Ret	7		20	6th
1977	Ligier Gitanes	Ligier JS7	Matra V12	G		ARG	BRA	RSA	USW	ESP	MON	BEL	SWE	FRA	GBR	GER	AUT	NED	ITA	USA	CAN	JPN	18	8th
1977	Ligier Gitanes	Ligier JS7	Matra V12	G	(France) Jacques Laffite	NC	Ret	Ret	9	7	7	Ret	1	8	6	Ret	Ret	2	8	7	Ret	5	18	8th
1977	Ligier Gitanes	Ligier JS7	Matra V12	G	(France) Jean-Pierre Jarier																	Ret	18	8th
1978	Ligier Gitanes	Ligier JS7; Ligier JS7/9; Ligier JS9	Matra V12	G		ARG	BRA	RSA	USW	MON	BEL	ESP	SWE	FRA	GBR	GER	AUT	NED	ITA	USA	CAN		19	6th
1978	Ligier Gitanes	Ligier JS7; Ligier JS7/9; Ligier JS9	Matra V12	G	(France) Jacques Laffite	16	9	5	5	Ret	5	3	7	7	10	3	5	8	4	11	Ret		19	6th
1981	Equipe Talbot Gitanes	Ligier JS17	Matra V12	MI		USW	BRA	ARG	SMR	BEL	MON	ESP	FRA	GBR	GER	AUT	NED	ITA	CAN	CPL			44	4th
1981	Equipe Talbot Gitanes	Ligier JS17	Matra V12	MI	(France) Jean-Pierre Jarier	Ret	7																44	4th
1981	Equipe Talbot Gitanes	Ligier JS17	Matra V12	MI	(France) Jean-Pierre Jabouille			DNQ	NC	Ret	DNQ	Ret											44	4th
1981	Equipe Talbot Gitanes	Ligier JS17	Matra V12	MI	(France) Patrick Tambay								Ret	Ret	Ret	Ret	Ret	Ret	Ret	Ret			44	4th
1981	Equipe Talbot Gitanes	Ligier JS17	Matra V12	MI	(France) Jacques Laffite	Ret	6	Ret	Ret	2	3	**2**	Ret	3	3	1	Ret	Ret	1	6			44	4th
1982	Equipe Talbot Gitanes	Ligier JS17; Ligier JS17B; Ligier JS19	Matra V12	MI		RSA	BRA	USW	SMR	BEL	MON	DET	CAN	NED	GBR	FRA	GER	AUT	SUI	ITA	CPL		20	8th
1982	Equipe Talbot Gitanes	Ligier JS17; Ligier JS17B; Ligier JS19	Matra V12	MI	(United States) Eddie Cheever	Ret	Ret	Ret		3	Ret	2	10	DNQ	Ret	16	Ret	Ret	Ret	6	3		20	8th
1982	Equipe Talbot Gitanes	Ligier JS17; Ligier JS17B; Ligier JS19	Matra V12	MI	(France) Jacques Laffite	Ret	Ret	Ret		9	Ret	6	Ret	Ret	Ret	14	Ret	3	Ret	Ret	Ret		20	8th

== World Sportscar Championship results ==
The table below summarizes the results obtained by Matra's World Sportscar Championship cars fitted with the Matra Sports V12:

Year	Event	Team	Car	Engine	Power at rpm	Driver	Position
1968	24 Hours of Le Mans	Matra Sports	Matra MS630	MS9	390 at 10,500	Pescarolo-Servoz-Gavin	DNF
1972	24 Hours of Le Mans	Equipe Matra-Simca Shell	Matra MS670	MS12	435 at 11,000	Pescarolo-Hill	1
1972	24 Hours of Le Mans	Equipe Matra-Simca Shell	Matra MS670	MS12	435 at 11,000	Cevert-Ganley	2
1973	6 Hours of Vallelunga^{1}	Equipe Matra-Simca	Matra MS670B	MS12	450 at 10,500	Pescarolo-Larrousse	1
1973	1000 km of Digione^{1}	Equipe Matra-Simca	Matra MS670B	MS12	450 at 10,500	Pescarolo-Larrousse	1
1973	24 Hours of Le Mans^{1}	Equipe Matra-Simca	Matra MS670B	MS12	450 at 10,500	Pescarolo-Larrousse	1
1973	24 Hours of Le Mans^{1}	Equipe Matra-Simca	Matra MS670B	MS12	450 at 10,500	Jabouille-Jaussaud	3
1973	1000 km Zeltweg^{1}	Equipe Matra-Simca	Matra MS670B	MS12	450 at 10,500	Pescarolo-Larrousse	1
1973	6 Hours of Watkins Glen^{1}	Equipe Matra-Simca	Matra MS670B	MS12	450 at 10,500	Pescarolo-Larrousse	1
1974	1000 km of Spa^{2}	Equipe Gitanes	Matra MS670C	MS12/73	490 at 11,500	Jarier-Ickx	1
1974	1000 km of Nürburgring^{2}	Equipe Gitanes	Matra MS670C	MS12/73	490 at 11,500	Jarier-Beltoise	1
1974	1000 km of Imola^{2}	Equipe Gitanes	Matra MS670B/C	MS12/73	490 at 11,500	Pescarolo-Larrousse	1
1974	24 Hours of Le Mans^{2}	Equipe Gitanes	Matra MS670B	MS12/73	450 at 10,500	Pescarolo-Larrousse	1
1974	24 Hours of Le Mans^{2}	Equipe Gitanes	Matra MS670B	MS12/73	450 at 10,500	Jabouille-Migault	3
1974	1000 km Zeltweg^{2}	Equipe Gitanes	Matra MS670B/C	MS12/73	490 at 11,500	Pescarolo-Larrousse	1
1974	6 Hours of Watkins Glen^{2}	Equipe Gitanes	Matra MS670C	MS12/73	490 at 11,500	Jarier-Beltoise	1
1974	1000 km of Le Castellet^{2}	Equipe Gitanes	Matra MS670C	MS12/73	490 at 11,500	Jarier-Beltoise	1
1974	1000 km of Brands Hatch^{2}	Equipe Gitanes	Matra MS670C	MS12/73	490 at 11,500	Jarier-Beltoise	1
1974	6 Hours of Kyalami^{2}	Equipe Gitanes	Matra MS670B/C	MS12/73	490 at 11,500	Pescarolo-Larrousse	1
Note:^{1}Valid for the 1973 Sports Prototype Championship, at the end of which Matra will be the overall winner^{2}Valid for the 1974 Sports Prototype Championship, at the end of which Matra will be the overall winner

== Proposed replacements ==
=== MS71 flat 12 ===
In 1971 Matra Sports developed a 3.0-litre flat-twelve engine for their MS120B F1 car. A prototype with an aluminium crankcase is part of the engine display at the Matra Museum in Romorantin-Lanthenay.

=== MS82 V6 ===
Work began on a new turbocharged F1 engine at the end of the 1980 season. Martin left the choice of the engine's configuration up to the customer bankrolling the project.

In the end the configuration chosen was a V6 with a 120° bank angle. Bore × stroke were 80 mm × 49.6 mm (3.1 in × 2.0 in), for a total displacement of 1,496 cc (91.3 cu in). The engine weighed 144 kg (317 lb). A power output of 650 PS (480 kW) was observed during a test run in 1982, with outputs of up to 805 PS (592 kW) predicted in the future. At the end of that year, Matra owner Peugeot declined to finance further development, and their chief client, the Ligier F1 team, opted to buy Renault engines instead."

== Replica/continuation engines ==
After becoming established as a rebuilder of original Matra Sports MS76 engines, the Nicholson-McLaren company was commissioned to produce a run of ten reproduction engines. A set of complete drawings for the engine block, cylinder heads, crankshafts, and all anciliaries was created based on original blueprints, scans of original components, and reverse-engineering of original Matra parts.
