= Matra MS120 =

Formula One car produced by Matra

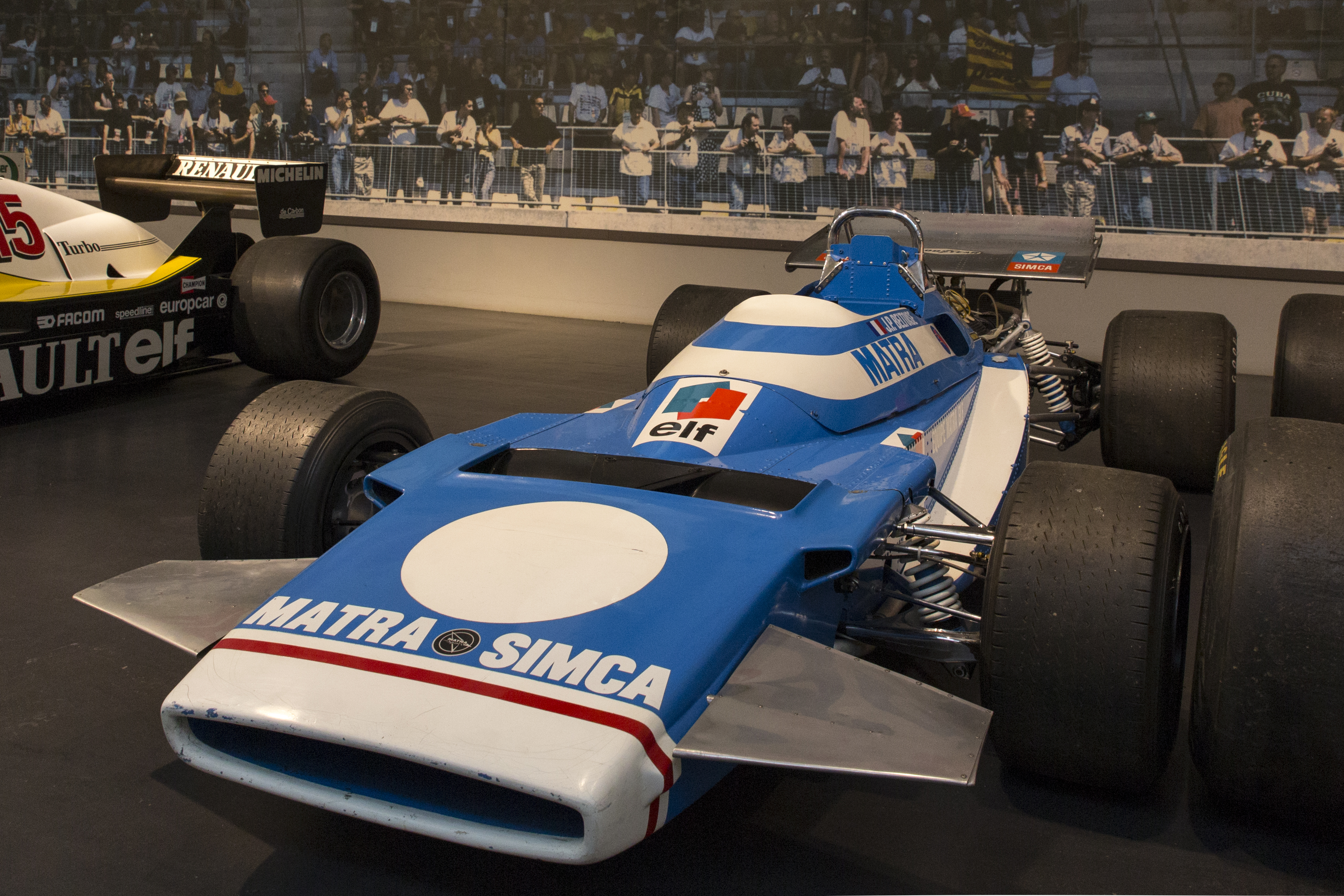
- Category: Formula One
- Constructor: Matra
- Designers: Gerard Ducarouge; Bernard Boyer
- Predecessor: MS80 / MS84

Technical specifications
- Chassis: Aluminium monocoque
- Engine: Matra 2,993 cc (182.6 cu in) V12 naturally aspirated mid-engined
- Transmission: Hewland DG300 5 speed
- Fuel: Elf
- Tyres: Goodyear

Competition history
- Notable entrants: Matra
- Notable drivers: (France) Jean-Pierre Beltoise (France) Henri Pescarolo (New Zealand) Chris Amon
- Debut: 1970 South African Grand Prix
Races	Wins	Podiums	Poles	F/Laps
35	0	5	2	3
- Unless otherwise stated, all data refer to Formula One World Championship Grands Prix only.

The Matra MS120 was the sixth and final Formula One car produced by Matra (following the MS9, MS10, MS11, MS80 and MS84).

== Development ==
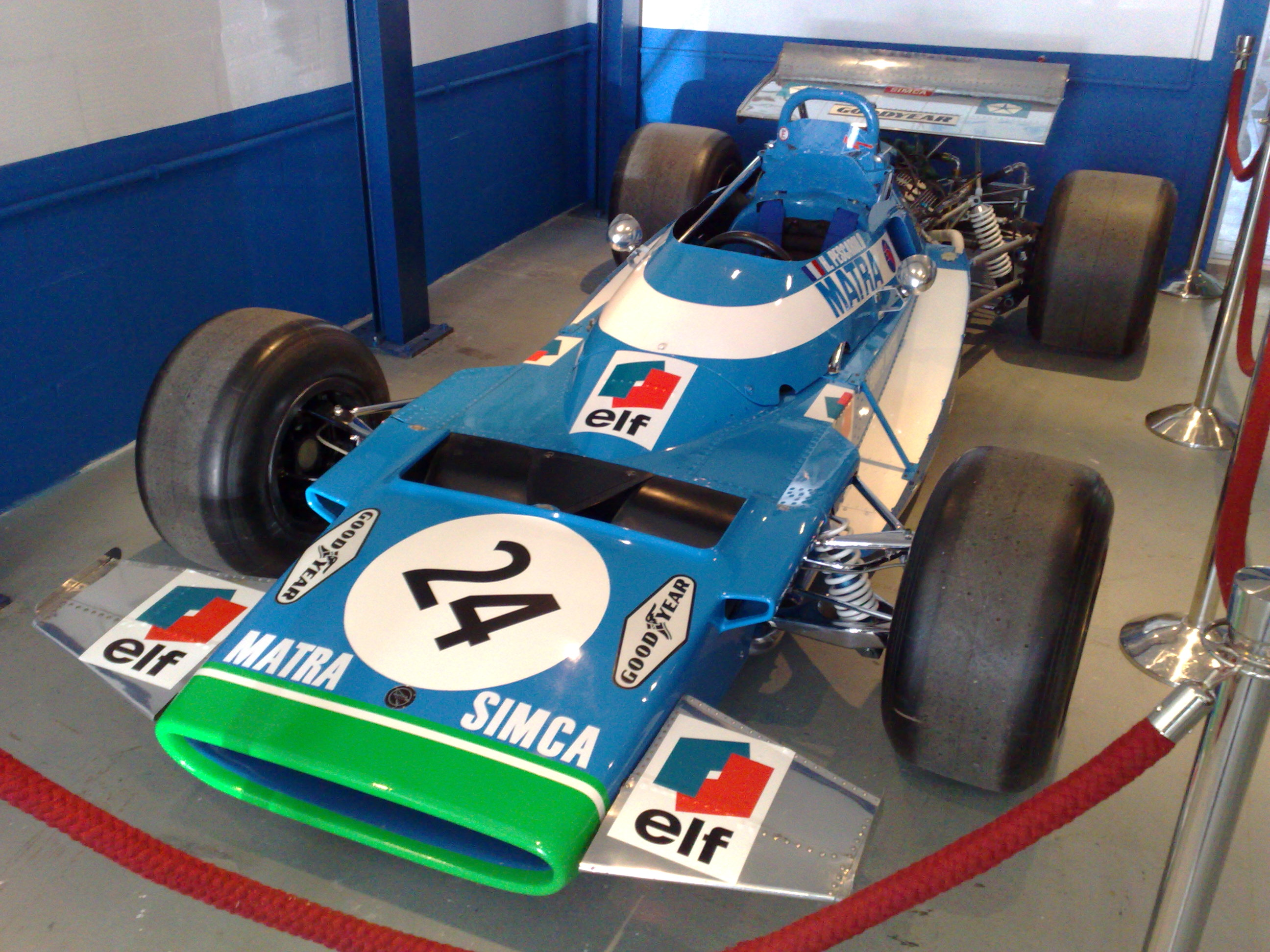
Chris Amon's Matra MS120B used in the 1971 Argentine Grand Prix

The MS120 was later developed to become the Matra MS120B, Matra MS120C and Matra MS120D. The car was built at Matra's Formula One base at Vélizy-Villacoublay in the southwestern suburbs of Paris, designed under the direction of Gérard Ducarouge and Bernard Boyer.

For 1970 following the agreement with Simca, Matra asked Tyrrell to use their Matra Sports V12 engine rather than the Cosworth. Jackie Stewart got to test the Matra V12, but since a large part of the Tyrrell budget was provided by Ford, and another significant sponsor was French state-owned petroleum company Elf, which had an agreement with Renault that precluded supporting a Simca partner, the partnership between Matra and Tyrrell ended.

Matra chose an all French line up with Jean-Pierre Beltoise and Henri Pescarolo for 1970.

== Racing history ==
=== 1970 ===
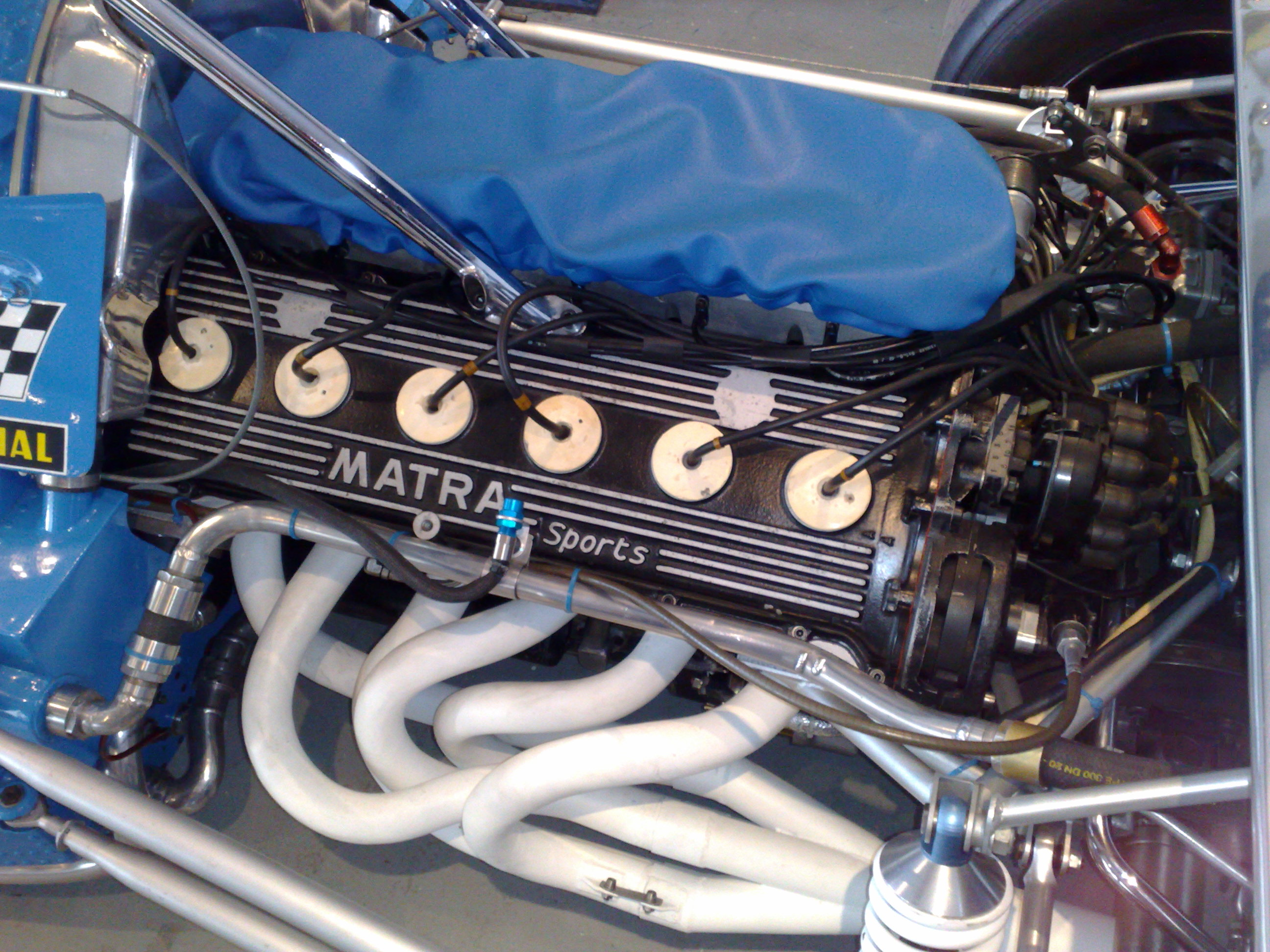
The engine of the Matra MS120

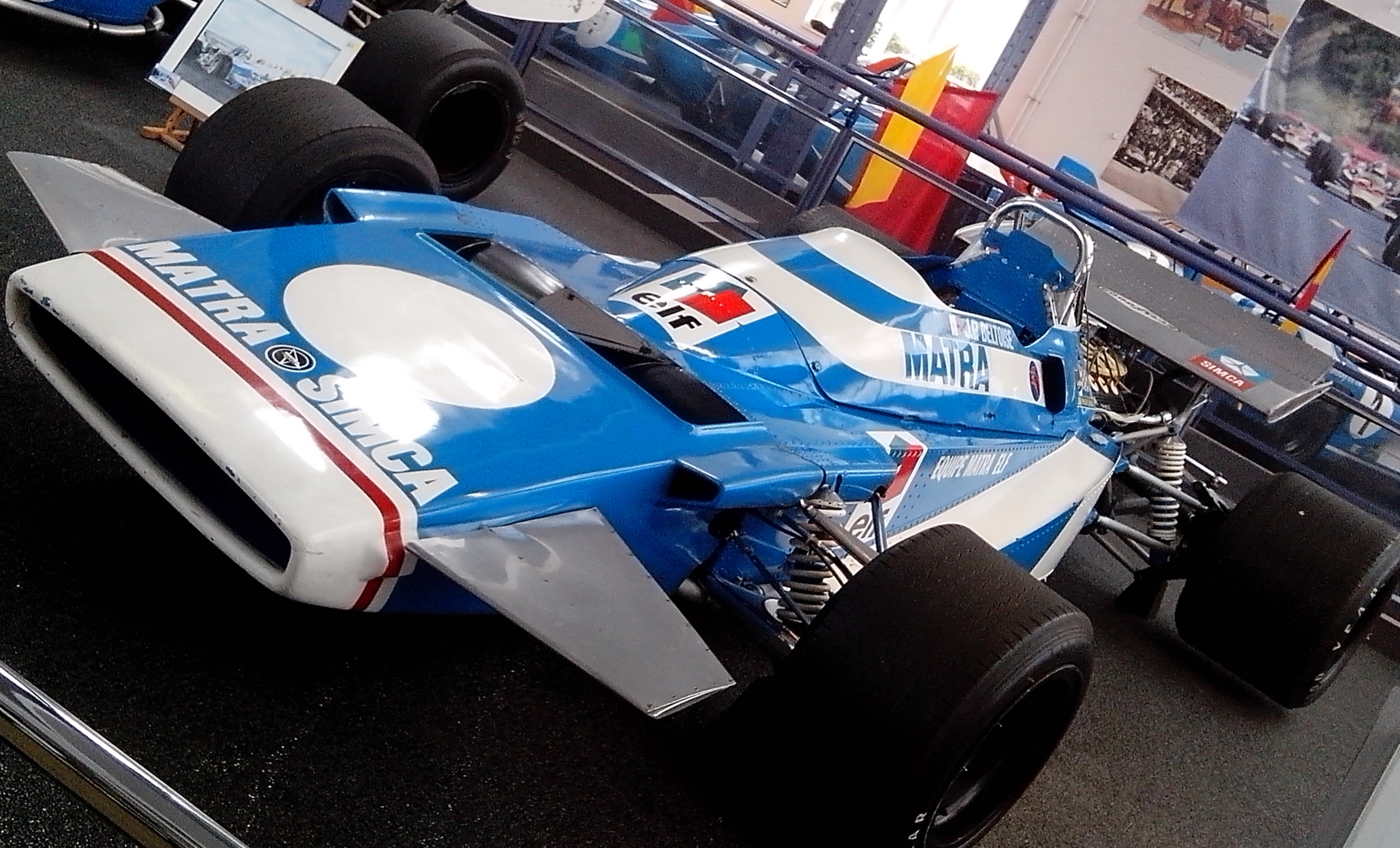
The car of Jean-Pierre Beltoise present in the Espace Automobiles Matra

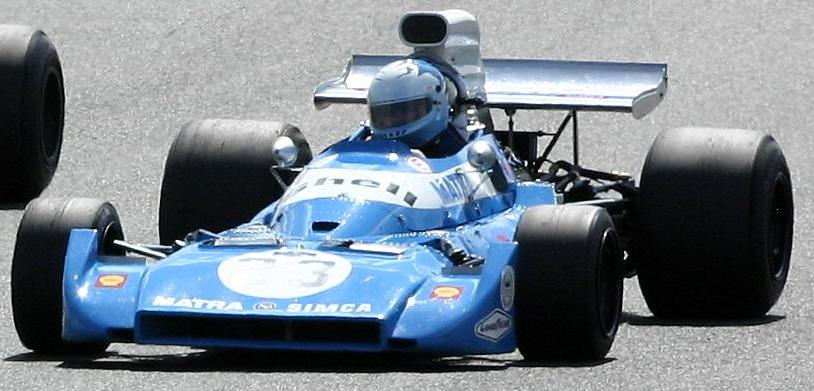
Matra MS120D

The South African Grand Prix was good for Beltoise with a fourth-place finish while Pescarolo had a disappointing seventh place. The Spanish Grand Prix was a bad race, both retiring with engine failures. The Monaco Grand Prix saw Pescarolo get third place, but Beltoise retire with differential failure. The Belgian Grand Prix saw Pescarolo finish sixth with electrical failure while Beltoise scored a third-place finish. The Dutch Grand Prix saw Beltoise 5th and Pescarolo 8th. Then the French Grand Prix, which was Matra's, Beltoise's and Pescarolo's home race, saw Pescarolo fifth and Beltoise 13th, out of fuel. Next, the British Grand Prix was a bad race with both retiring, Beltoise with a wheel problem and Pescarolo with an accident. Then the German Grand Prix saw Pescarolo get sixth place, but Beltoise retire with suspension failure. Next was the Austrian Grand Prix with Beltoise sixth and Pescarolo 14th. Then the Italian Grand Prix saw Beltoise finish third but Pescarolo retire with engine failure. Next, the Canadian Grand Prix saw Pescarolo seventh and Beltoise eighth. Then the United States Grand Prix saw Pescarolo in eighth place, but Beltoise retire with a bad handling car. Finally, it was the Mexican Grand Prix with Beltoise fifth and Pescarolo ninth, although the race was delayed by an hour because of crowd control. Pescarolo was not retained by Matra for 1971 and was replaced by New Zealand's Chris Amon.

=== 1971 ===
Matra kept Frenchman Jean-Pierre Beltoise, and New Zealander Chris Amon joined Matra using the Matra MS120B specification version for 1971. Beltoise was in difficulty following the 1971 1000 km Buenos Aires; racing for the Matra sports car team; he was involved in the accident in which Ignazio Giunti died, and Beltoise's international racing licence was suspended for some time. Amon won the Non-Championship Argentine Grand Prix and finished fifth in the first round in the 1971 season in the South African Grand Prix. Beltoise returned for the Spanish Grand Prix finishing sixth and Amon finished third. The Monaco Grand Prix was a bad race with both retiring with differential failures. The Dutch Grand Prix saw Beltoise ninth and Amon retiring after he spun off. Then came the French Grand Prix which was Matra's and Beltoise's home race, with Amon fifth and Beltoise seventh. Next, the British Grand Prix saw Beltoise seventh and Amon retiring with an engine failure. The German Grand Prix saw Matra only entering Amon and retiring because of an accident. Matra missed the Austrian Grand Prix but entered the Italian Grand Prix, where Matra only entered Amon again who took pole and proved an embarrassment to Ferrari at their home track, and finished sixth. Then the Canadian Grand Prix saw Beltoise back but retiring with an accident, and Amon finish 10th. The final race of 1971 was the United States Grand Prix with Beltoise eighth and Amon 12th.

In 1971 Matra signed Amon as team leader which frustrated Beltoise. For 1972 Beltoise left to join BRM.

=== 1972 ===
Chris Amon stayed with Matra, using the Matra MS120C specification version for 1972 before being replaced by the Matra MS120D version mid-season. The Argentine Grand Prix was a bad race for Amon with gearbox problems on the warm-up lap. He then finished 15th in the South African Grand Prix. More gearbox problems followed at the Spanish Grand Prix, before luck came Amon's way with two sixth-place finishes at Monaco and in Belgium. The French Grand Prix saw Amon on pole and he was leading the race until a puncture forced him to pit, but he charged back through the field, bettering the Charade Circuit lap record to finish third. Amon finished fourth in the British Grand Prix and 15th in the German Grand Prix, before another points finish with fifth in the Austrian Grand Prix. Amon's brakes failed in the Italian Grand Prix and he later came in sixth in the Canadian Grand Prix. At the last race of the season, he finished 15th in the United States Grand Prix. Matra pulled out of Formula One afterwards to concentrate on Le Mans.

== Complete Formula One World Championship results ==
(key) (results in bold indicate pole position; results in italics indicate fastest lap)

Year	Entrant	Chassis	Tyres	Drivers	1	2	3	4	5	6	7	8	9	10	11	12	13	Points	WCC
1970	Equipe Matra Elf	MS120	G		RSA	ESP	MON	BEL	NED	FRA	GBR	GER	AUT	ITA	CAN	USA	MEX	23	7th
1970	Equipe Matra Elf	MS120	G	Jean-Pierre Beltoise	4	Ret	Ret	3	5	13	Ret	Ret	6	3	8	Ret	5	23	7th
1970	Equipe Matra Elf	MS120	G	Henri Pescarolo	7	Ret	3	6	8	5	Ret	6	14	Ret	7	8	9	23	7th
1971	Equipe Matra Sports	MS120B	G		RSA	ESP	MON	NED	FRA	GBR	GER	AUT	ITA	CAN	USA			9	7th
1971	Equipe Matra Sports	MS120B	G	Chris Amon	5	3	Ret	Ret	5	Ret	Ret	DNA	**6**	10	12			9	7th
1971	Equipe Matra Sports	MS120B	G	Jean-Pierre Beltoise	DNA	6	Ret	9	7	7	DNA	DNA		Ret	8			9	7th
1972	Equipe Matra Sports	MS120C	G		ARG	RSA	ESP	MON	BEL	FRA	GBR	GER	AUT	ITA	CAN	USA		12	8th
1972	Equipe Matra Sports	MS120C	G	Chris Amon	DNS	15	Ret	6	6		4							12	8th
1972	Equipe Matra Sports	MS120D	G	Chris Amon						**3**		15	5	Ret	6	15		12	8th

== Non-Championship Formula One results ==
(key) (Races in bold indicate pole position) (Races in italics indicate fastest lap)

Year	Entrant	Chassis	Engines	Tyres	Drivers	1	2	3	4	5	6	7	8
1970	Equipe Matra Elf	Matra MS120	Matra V12	**G**		ROC	INT	OUL					
1970	Equipe Matra Elf	Matra MS120	Matra V12	**G**	Jean-Pierre Beltoise	Ret							
1971	Equipe Matra Sports	Matra MS120B	Matra V12	**G**		ARG	ROC	QUE	SPR	INT	RIN	OUL	VIC
1971	Equipe Matra Sports	Matra MS120B	Matra V12	**G**	Chris Amon	1		4		**12**			
1971	Equipe Matra Sports	Matra MS120B	Matra V12	**G**	Jean-Pierre Beltoise					Ret			
