= Georges Martin (engineer) =

French automotive engineer

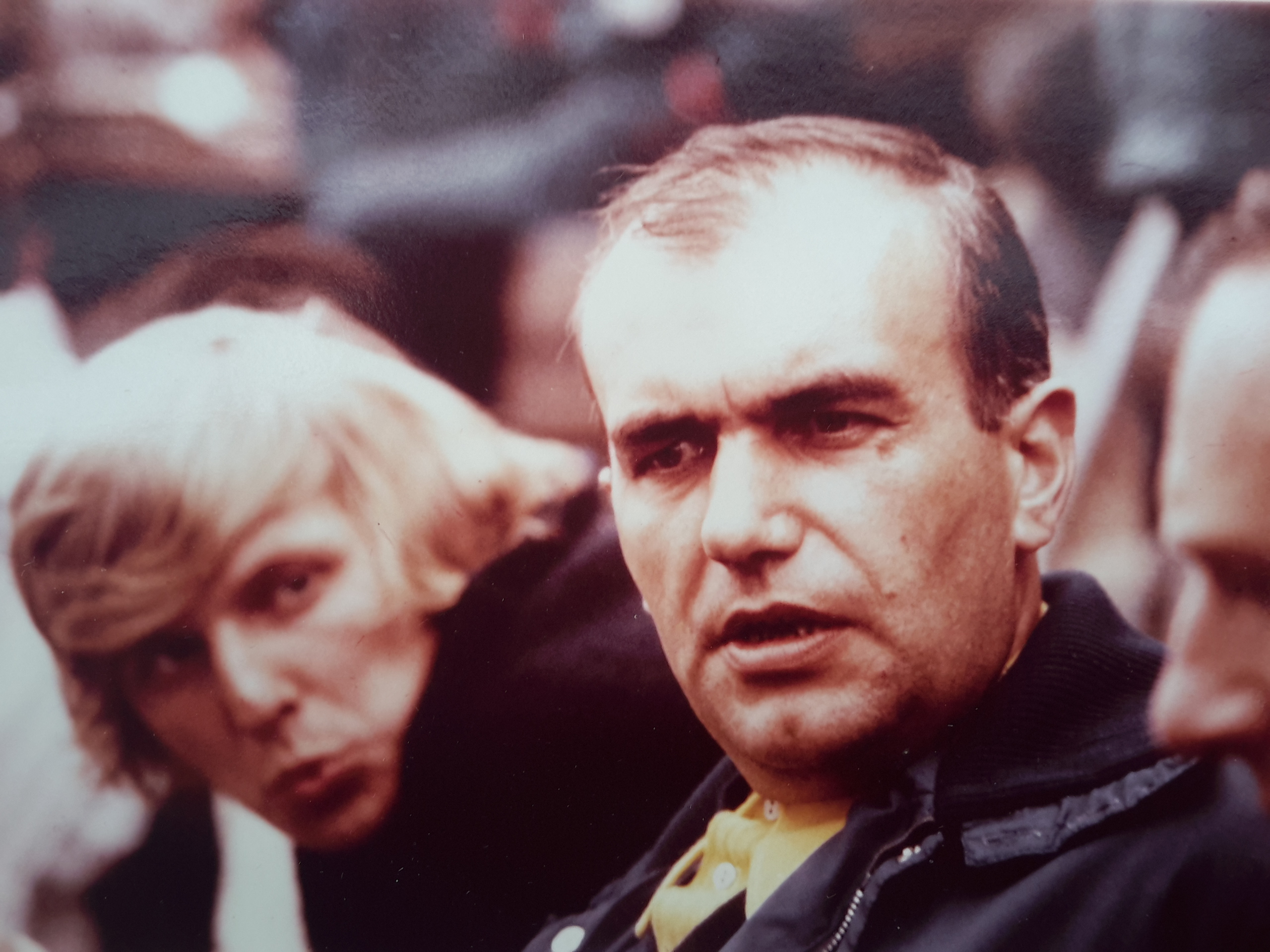
- Martin (right) and Johnny Servoz-Gavin at Le Mans in 1969
- Born: Georges Lucien Raymond Martin; March 14, 1930; La Ferté-Alais, France
- Died: July 29, 2017 (aged 87); Olonne-sur-Mer, France
- Occupation: Automotive engineer
- Notable work: Simca Poissy engine; Matra Sports V12 engine

Georges Lucien Raymond Martin (14 March 1930 – 29 July 2017) was a French engineer who designed automobile internal combustion engines, including the Simca Poissy engine that was produced from 1961 until 1991, and the Matra Sports V12 engine for Formula One (F1) and endurance sportscar racing.

== Career ==
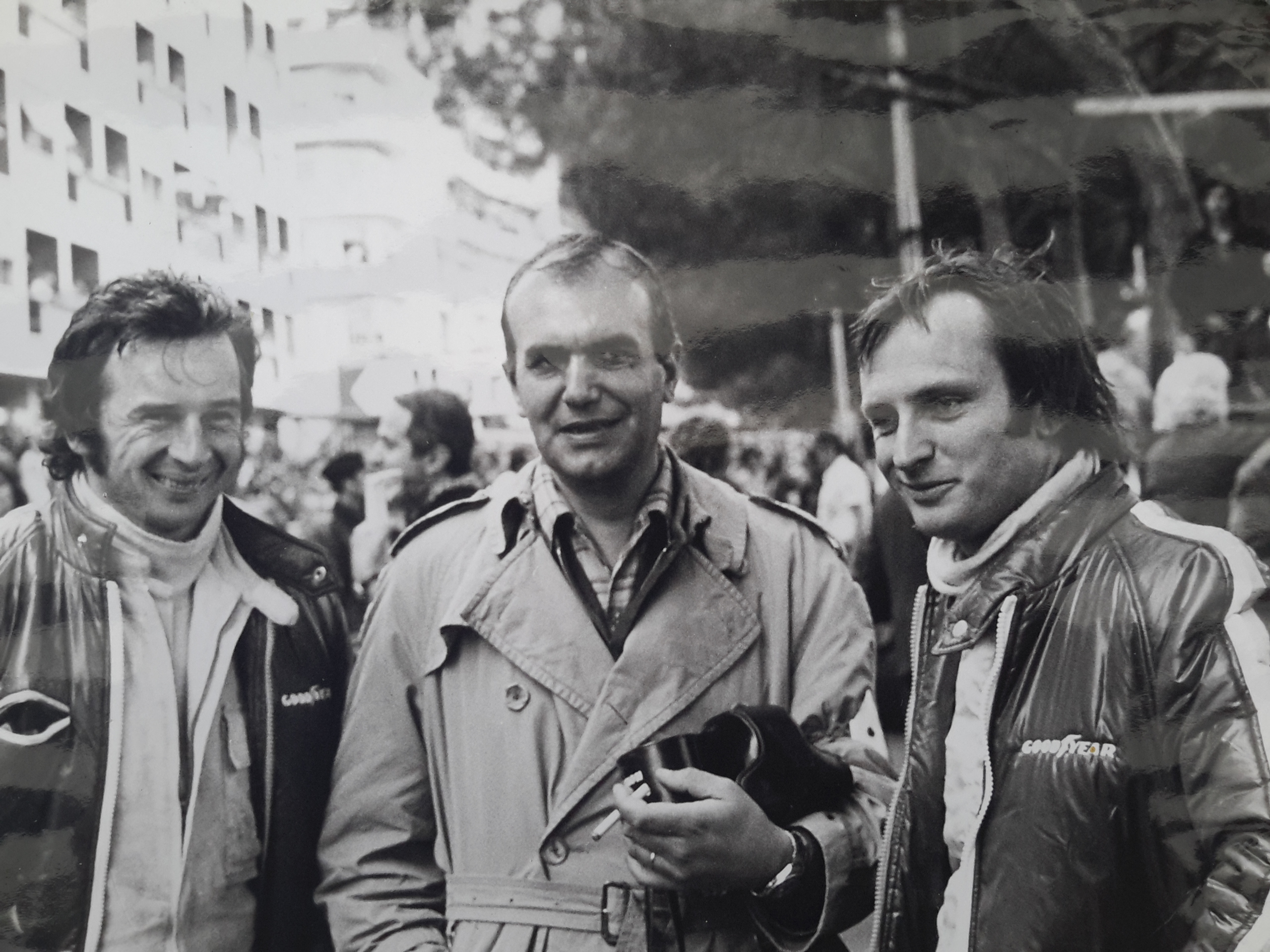
Jean-Pierre Beltoise, Georges Martin and Chris Amon at the 1971 Monaco Grand Prix

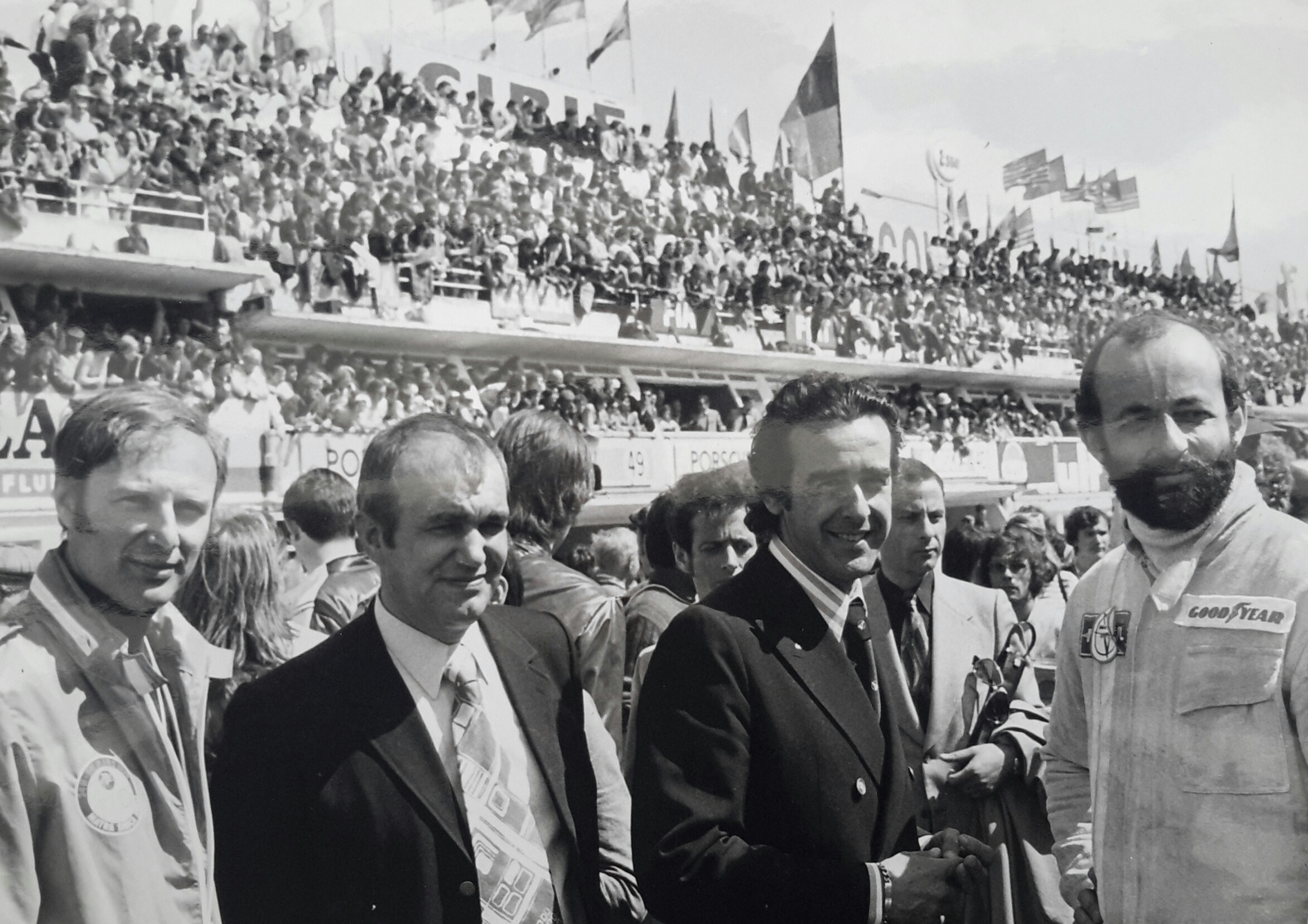
Bernard Boyer, Georges Martin, Jean-Luc Lagardère and Henri Pescarolo at the 1972 24 Hours of Le Mans

Martin graduated from the Génie mécanique et électrique (Mechanical and Electrical Engineering) department of l'École Spéciale des Travaux Publics (ESTP — the Special School of Public Works). He joined Simca in 1959.

In the Simca design office, he designed the Poissy engine that was in production in various displacements for 30 years, from its first appearance in the Simca 1000 in 1961 to the last use under Peugeot ownership in 1991, when it was fitted to the Peugeot 309. This engine was noted for its reliability, and for producing better than average power and torque from its modest displacement. It was fairly advanced for its time, having an aluminum head and sump, five main bearings, and a reasonably high compression ratio, but was sometimes criticized for excessive valve train noise. This noise was the result of the engine using a double-row timing chain with no tensioner, which was noisier than an equivalent single-row chain with tensioner. The engine was successfully rallied in the 1970s and appeared in a number of cars from Simca, Matra, Chrysler, Talbot, Peugeot, Plymouth, and Dodge.

Martin joined Matra at the end of 1966, at the invitation of Philippe Guédon, a former colleague at Simca who later became CEO of Matra. Arriving at Matra, he did not really know what was expected of him until Matra CEO Jean-Luc Lagardère told him that he would be developing a new F1 engine with a targeted specific output of 150 hp per litre. The resulting Matra Sports V12 engine gave Matra three consecutive wins at Le Mans from 1972 to 1974, the World Championship for Makes constructors title in 1973 and 1974, and a number of Formula One Grand Prix victories in Ligier F1 cars.

Martin's last major project for Matra was a new 120° 1.5-litre turbocharged V6 F1 engine. The engine reached the prototype stage. Martin left Matra in 1992.

A room in the Matra museum at Romorantin-Lanthenay featuring Matra's racing engines is named for Martin.

== Personal life ==
Martin was married to Colette Martin, née Jouvet. Colette died on 31 January 2013.
