= Matra MS640 =

Prototype race car

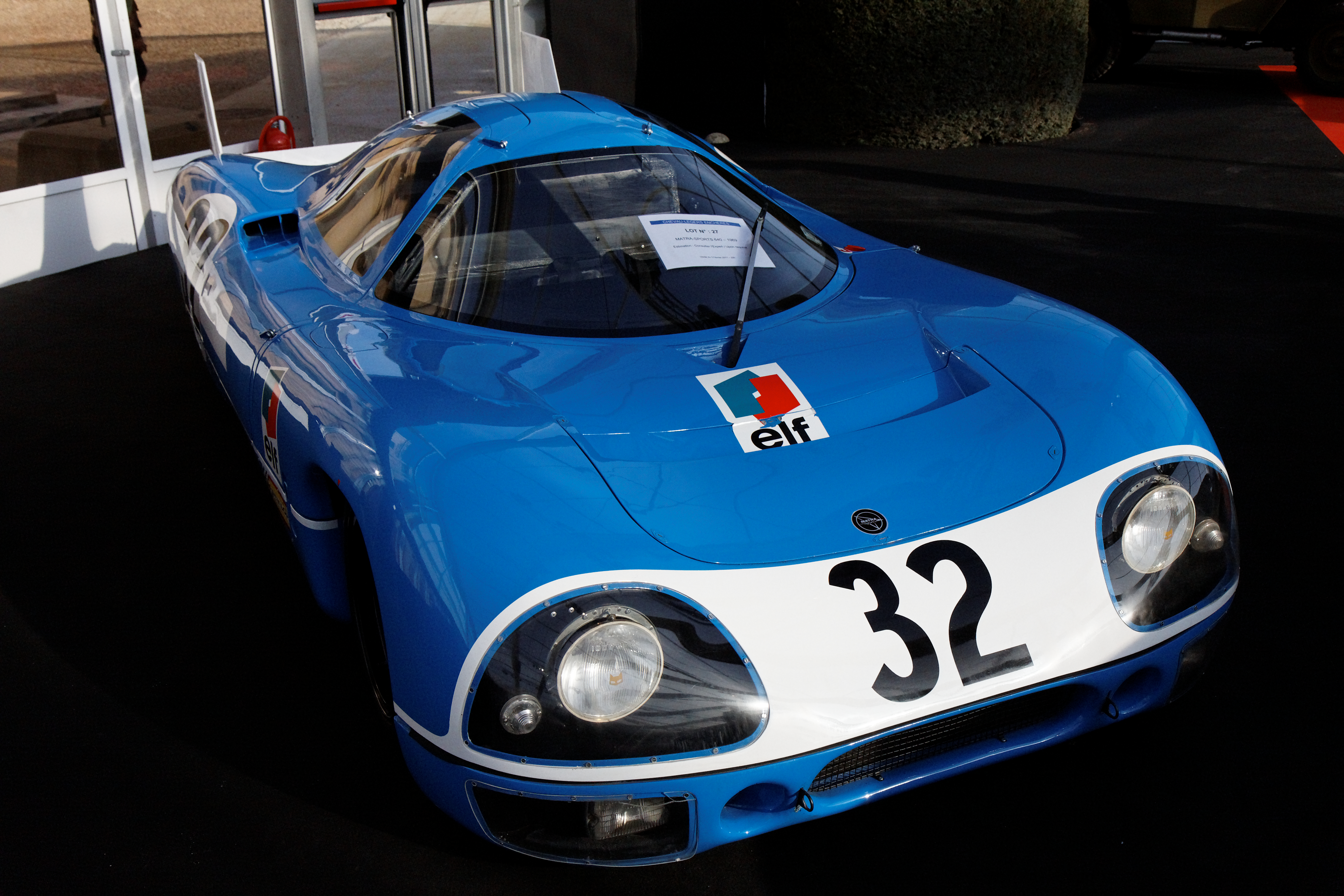
Matra MS640 - Festival Automobile International 2011 - Vente aux enchères

The Matra MS640 is a sports prototype race car, designed, developed, and built by the French manufacturer Matra in 1969. Two examples of this car were made: the original one from 1969 and the rebuild from 2005.

== Development ==
The Matra MS640 featured a tubular trellis frame similar to that of the MS650. Its coupe design, characterized by a drop-shaped bodywork, was the work of Robert Choulet, an aerodynamic engineer with prior experience at Deutsch & Bonnet. Choulet's design was inspired by his previous creations. The vehicle had a record car-like appearance, with an extremely elongated shape, a small cockpit covered by a bubble roof of equal size, rounded wheel arches that partially covered the rear wheels, and stabilizing fins on the tail. The MS640 was powered by the 420 Matra MS9 V12 3-litre engine, which was built in 1968 under the French government's initiative and had already been mounted on the Matra MS630.

== History and background ==
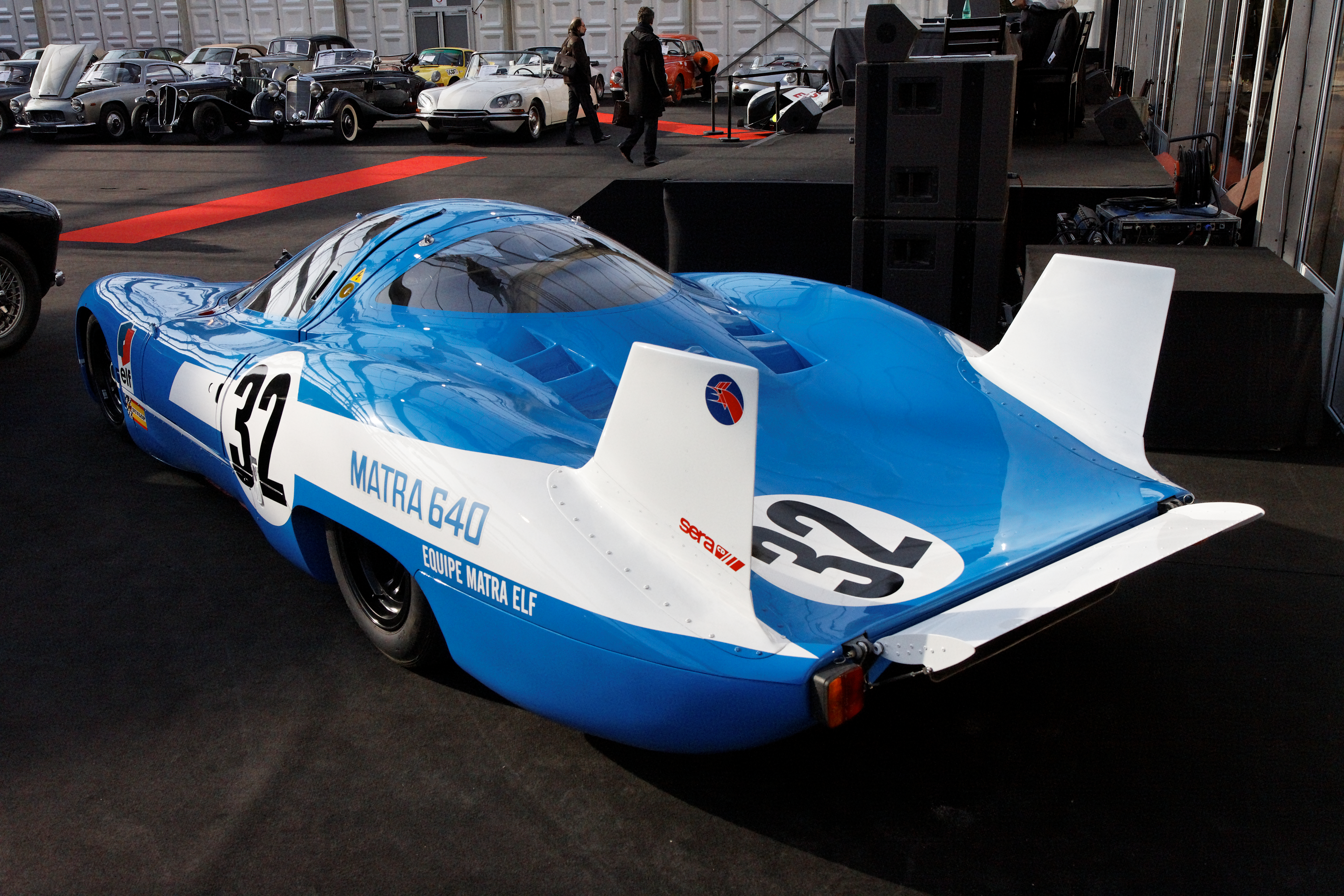
Rear view of the MS640

The MS630 had been designed for the 1968 season in accordance with the new regulations introduced that year (Group 6 prototypes limited to 3-litre engines and Group 4 sports cars limited to 5-litre engines and a minimum production run of 50 units). It had performed well at the 24 Hours of Le Mans of that year, holding the second place for a long time before giving it up towards the end of the race due to two punctures and an electrical fire. Following this, the director of Matra Jean Luc Lagardère entrusted Robert Choulet with the task of designing a closed car, extremely aerodynamic and designed specifically for the Circuit de la Sarthe, in order to compensate for the power gap suffered against the Porsche 917, Ford GT40, and Lola T70 and the higher fuel consumption compared to the Porsche 908. The resulting car captured the imagination and expectations of Lagardère, the press, and all of France, who could finally cultivate the dream of a "voiture bleue" on the top step of the podium at the 24 Hours of Le Mans.

At the collective tests of Le Mans, which were held in March, the new Matra 640 was not yet ready and the French manufacturer only fielded an MS630, making up the work lost on that occasion in April: it organized a private test session at the Circuit de la Sarthe. The car was entrusted to Henri Pescarolo and Johnny Servoz-Gavin, who had to develop the car during this test, as it had only previously run for a few kilometers on the runway of Marigny airport, on the occasion of the presentation to the press. Pescarolo was the first to leave the pits, instructed by the sporting director Georges Martin and designer Choulet to gradually push the car towards the limit. The first laps had to be done in a “neutral” aerodynamic configuration, to then make the further trim and aerodynamic adjustments.

Pescarolo immediately had the impression of “light” steering and when he entered the Hunaudières straight he pushed the car up to 250 km/h (160 mph). Hitting a bump, the 640 took off like an aeroplane "flying" along the surface with the wheels off the ground and the engine howling until the nose did not rear up causing it to flip and then crash to the side of the road. From the pits, a column of smoke was seen and immediately the team rushed to the scene of the accident: the trees had been cut at a height of one and a half meters and the debris was scattered within a radius of a few hundred meters, but the driver was alive, although he then had to spend six months convalescing to recover from burns, fractures of the limbs and injuries to the spine. Having recovered, although still limping, he won the 1000 km of Paris on the Montlhéry circuit aboard a Matra 650 paired with Beltoise. The "640", on the other hand, will never be used in the race as Jean-Luc Lagardère did not consent to the construction of another chassis, thus prompting Choulet to leave Matra in October 1969 to return to the Société d'Études et de Réalisations Automobiles (SERA-CD) where he participated in the design of the first version of the Porsche 917.

After the accident, an attempt was made to understand the causes, which in the designer's opinion had to be found in the bending of some parts of the bodywork, specifically the upper part of the doors, under the thrust of the air at high speeds. As the shape of the body changed, it became unstable and ready for take-off, a tendency that led to the accident and that could have been discovered and eliminated if the driver had gradually reached the maximum performance of the car lap after lap, according to Choulet. The fact is that the car's extreme aerodynamics meant that a minimum of instability was enough to result in an accident.

== Second version ==
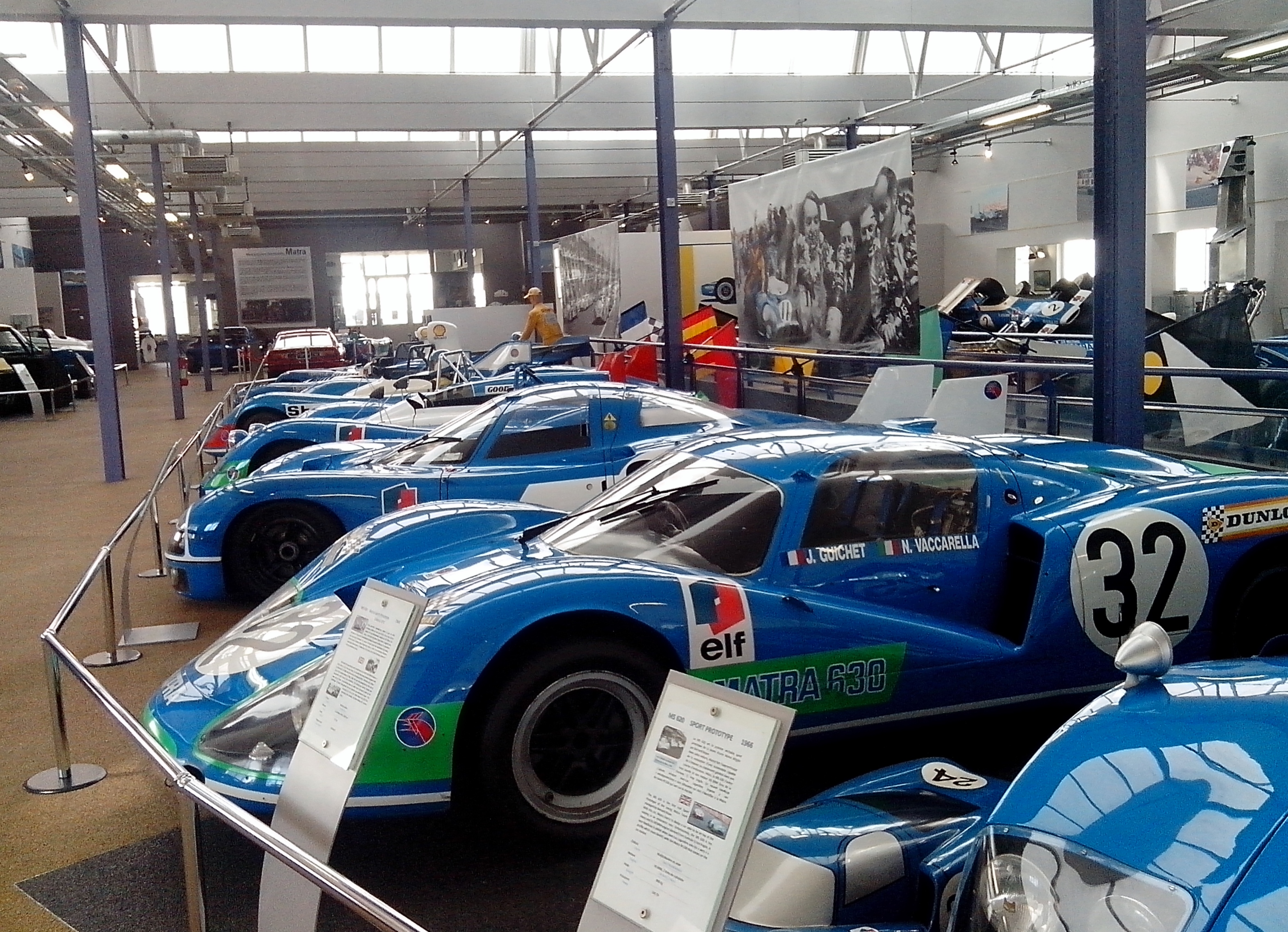
The Matra MS640 exhibited at the "Collection de l'Espace Automobiles Matra", visible behind the MS630 n ° 32

In 1989 the original moulds were found in the Matra factory, with some parts of the second bodywork inside and in 1995 Norma built a second frame and the missing parts of the bodywork on the basis of the original designs. For nine years the reconstruction of the MS 640 was stalled due to a lack of skilled craftsmen and after extensive research throughout France, it was entrusted to the EPAF in 2004, a company specializing in the restoration of racing cars, which completed the work through the use of construction techniques of 1969.

Once the car was completed, it was decided to subject it to a series of tests, to which were invited the now over sixty-year-old Henry Pescarolo. However, he asked to drive the car during the test, to complete the work interrupted over thirty-five years earlier, a request that was agreed to. To avoid the repetition of the disastrous accident of 1969, this 640 was equipped with a sensor system on the front suspension that warned the driver of the approaching limit beyond which the car would take off. On the track, every attempt to go beyond the touring pace set off the alarm, so the car went in and out of the pits to change the set-up and try again. The last test that remained to be done was to lower the nose until it touched the ground, to obtain maximum downforce, but the risk was that at the first braking it would stick to the asphalt: the front brakes should be deactivated, but the technicians exclude this possibility for safety reasons and communicate the end of the test to the driver. However, Pescarolo wanted to continue testing even without front brakes, despite everyone's opposition.

The machine thus modified no longer triggered the alarm and reached almost 290 km/h (180 mph) without taking off. At the end of the test, Pescarolo returned to the pits smiling, and jumped out of the passenger compartment invaded by acrid smoke coming from the faired rear wheel arches, from which flames come out. Too stressed by the deactivation of the front brakes, the rear brakes overheated, triggering a fire.

The Matra MS640 was exhibited at the Espace automobiles Matra museum in Romorantin – Lanthenay, between Bourges and Orléans, in France before being offered by Bonhams at an auction in Paris on February 6, 2025.
