= Matra MS11 =

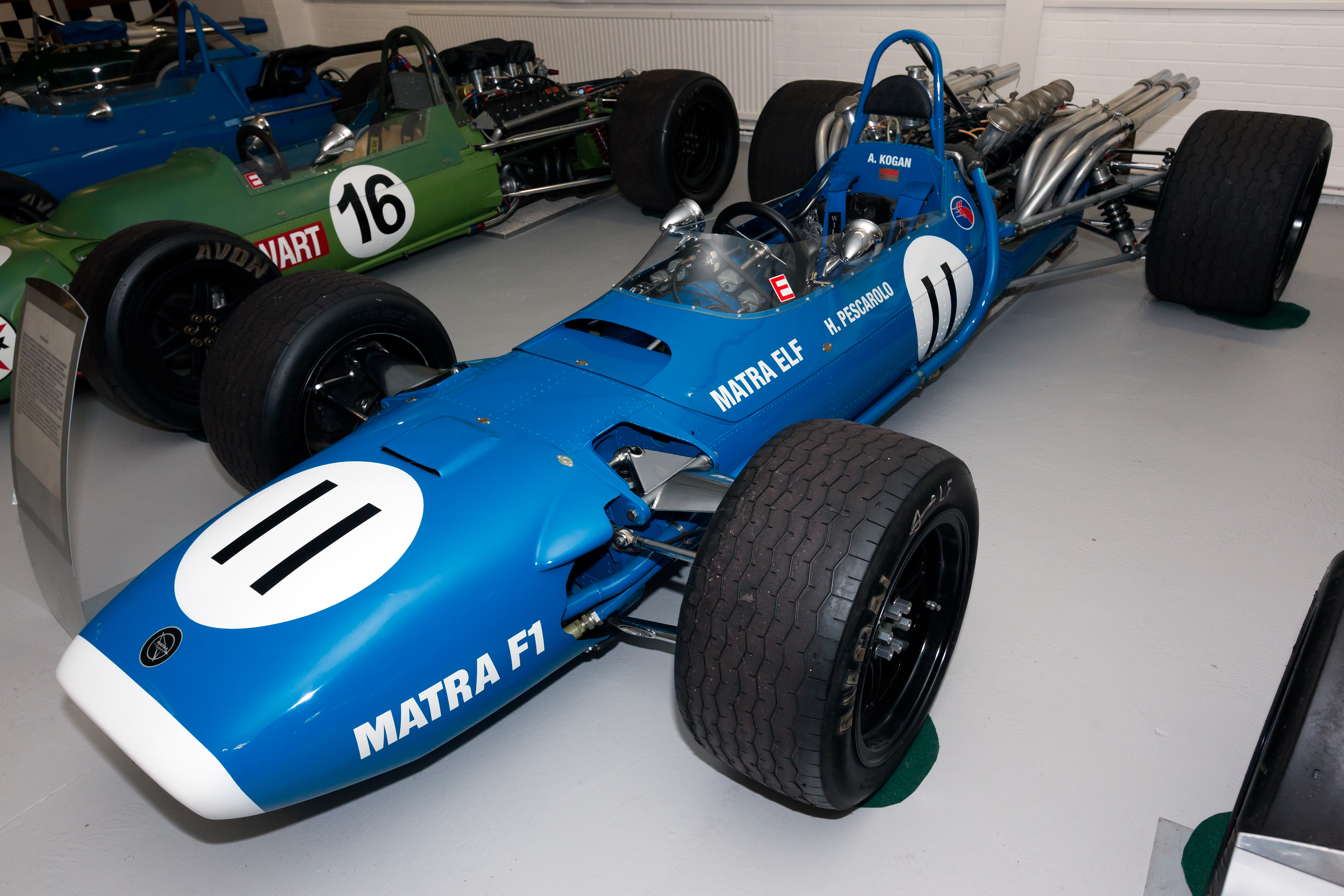
- Category: Formula One
- Constructor: Matra
- Designer(s): Gerard Ducarouge; Bernard Boyer
- Predecessor: MS7
- Successor: MS80

Technical specifications
- Chassis: Aluminium monocoque
- Engine: Matra MS9 2,993 cc (182.6 cu in) V12 NA mid-engined
- Transmission: Hewland DG300/FG 400 5 speed
- Weight: 580 kg (1,278.7 lb)
- Fuel: Elf
- Tyres: Dunlop

Competition history
- Notable entrants: Matra
- Notable drivers: (France) Henri Pescarolo (France) Jean-Pierre Beltoise
- Debut: 1968 Monaco Grand Prix
Races	Wins	Podiums	Poles	F/Laps
10	0	1	0	1
- Constructors' Championships: 0
- Drivers' Championships: 0
- n.b. Unless otherwise stated, all data refer to Formula One World Championship Grands Prix only.

The Matra MS11 is a Formula One car used by the Matra team during the 1968 Formula One season, developed from the successful MS7 F2 car. It was relatively unsuccessful compared to its sibling, the Cosworth DFV powered Matra MS10 which Jackie Stewart drove to second place in the World Drivers' Championship. The major problems were with the Matra Sports V12 engine, which was thirsty, underpowered, unreliable and prone to overheating. The car was raced almost exclusively by Jean-Pierre Beltoise with Henri Pescarolo driving a second car at the end of the season. Its best outing came at the 1968 Dutch Grand Prix where Beltoise finished second behind Stewart, and recorded the fastest lap. In 1969, Matra set aside the V12 project, concentrating on the DFV-powered MS80.

Gallery
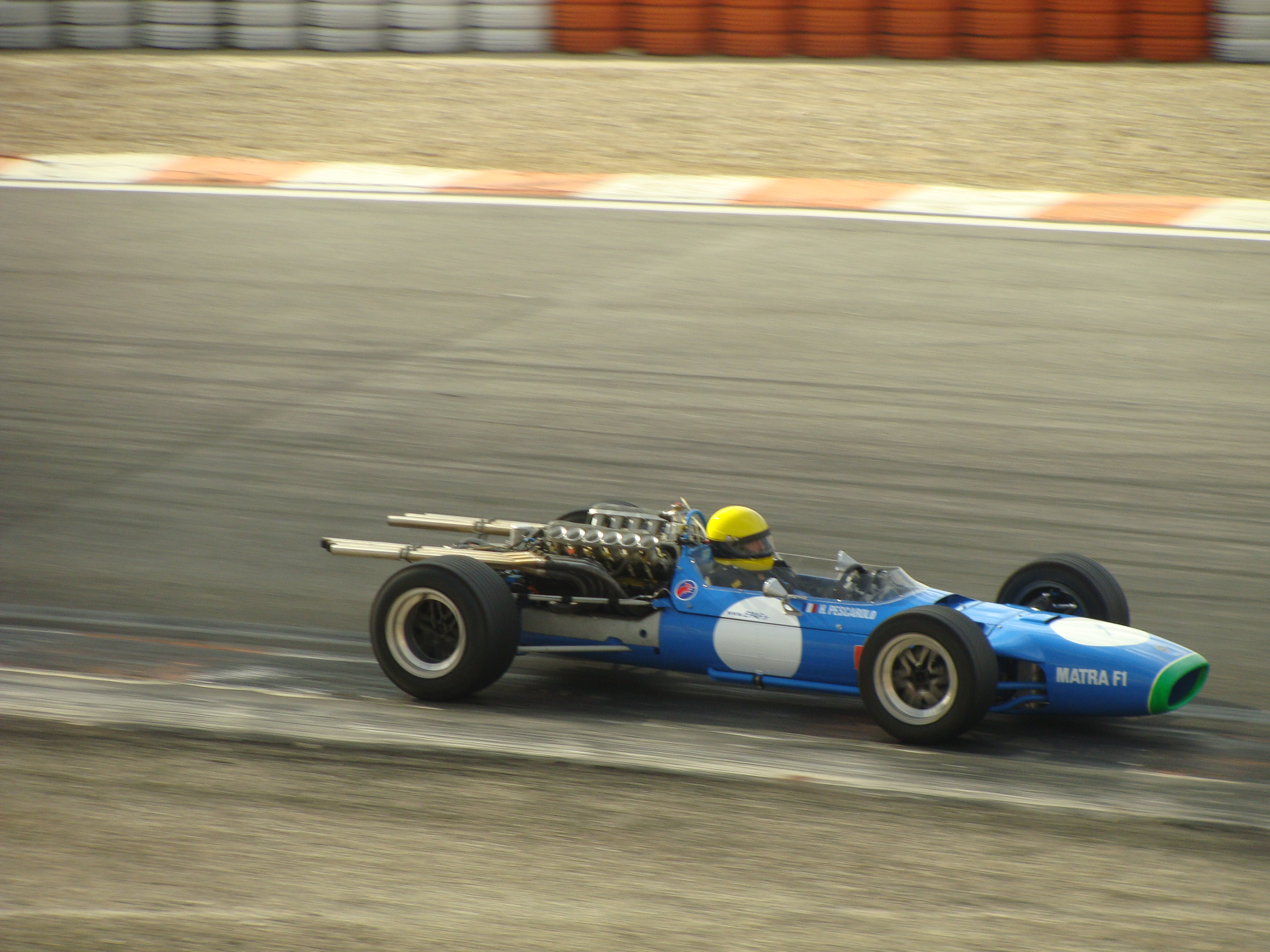
Matra MS11 being demonstrated in 2012

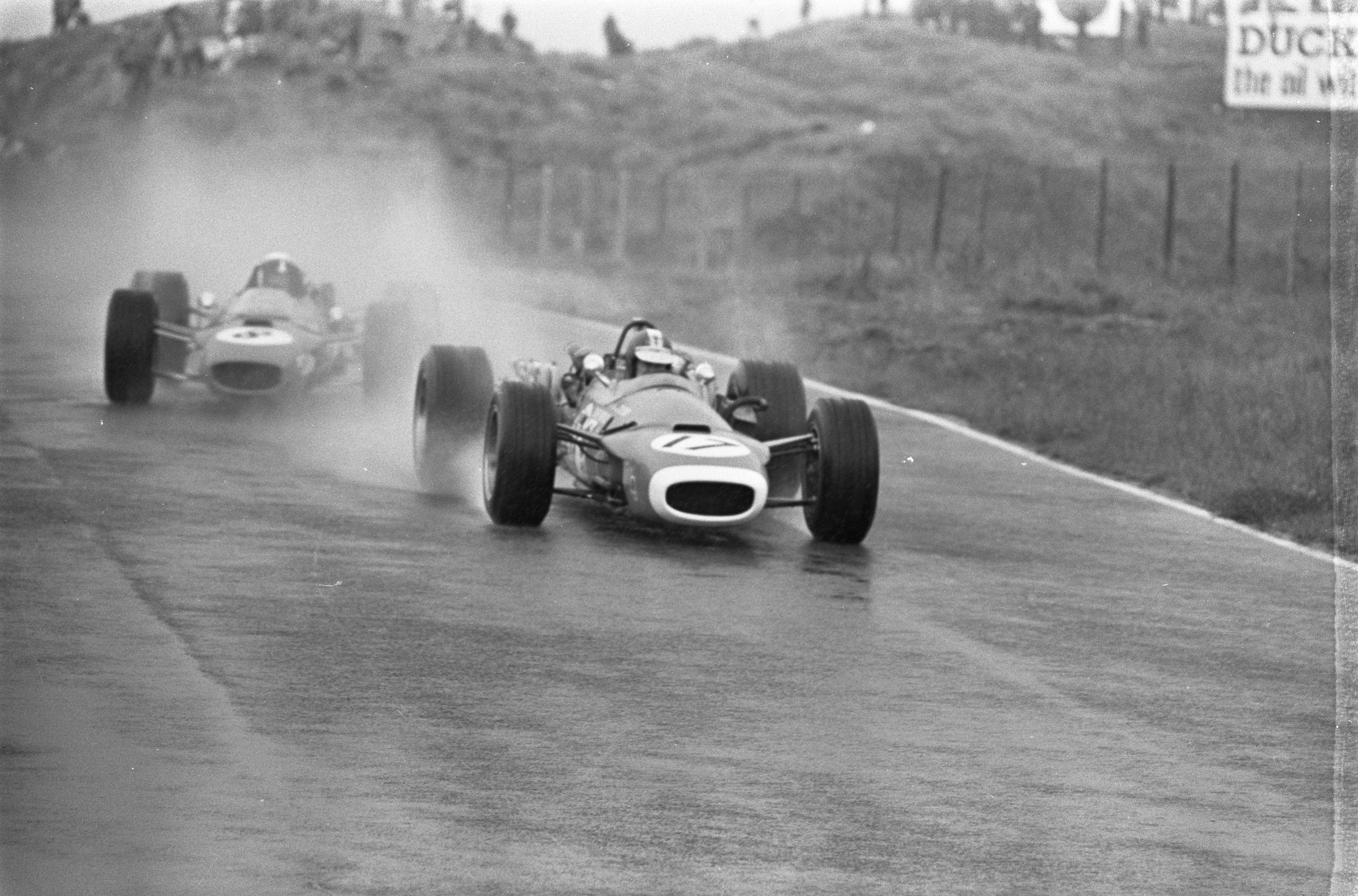
Jean-Pierre Beltoise leading Jackie Stewart at the 1968 Dutch Grand Prix

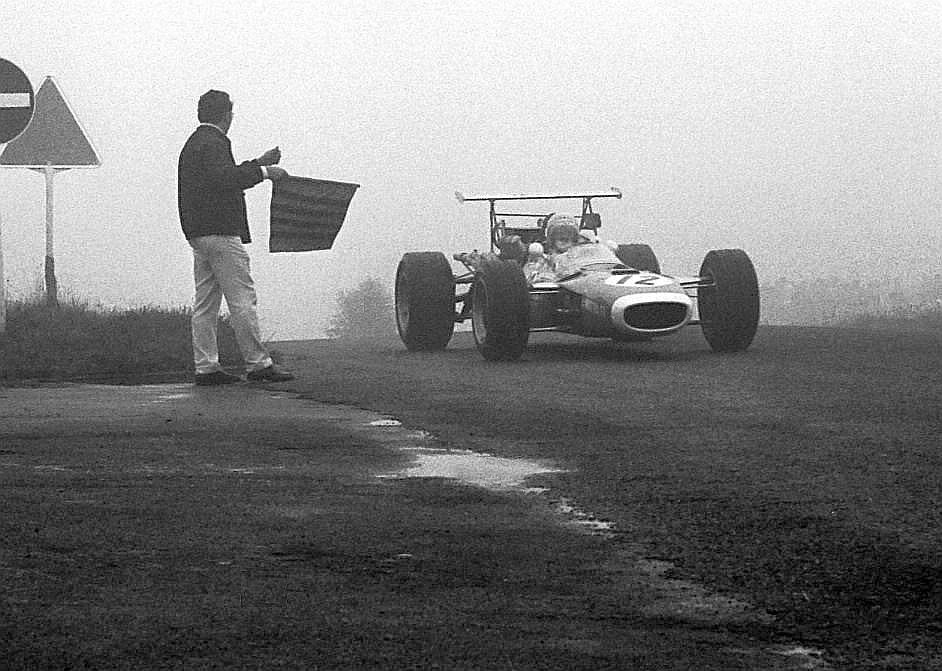
Jean-Pierre Beltoise during practice for the 1968 German Grand Prix

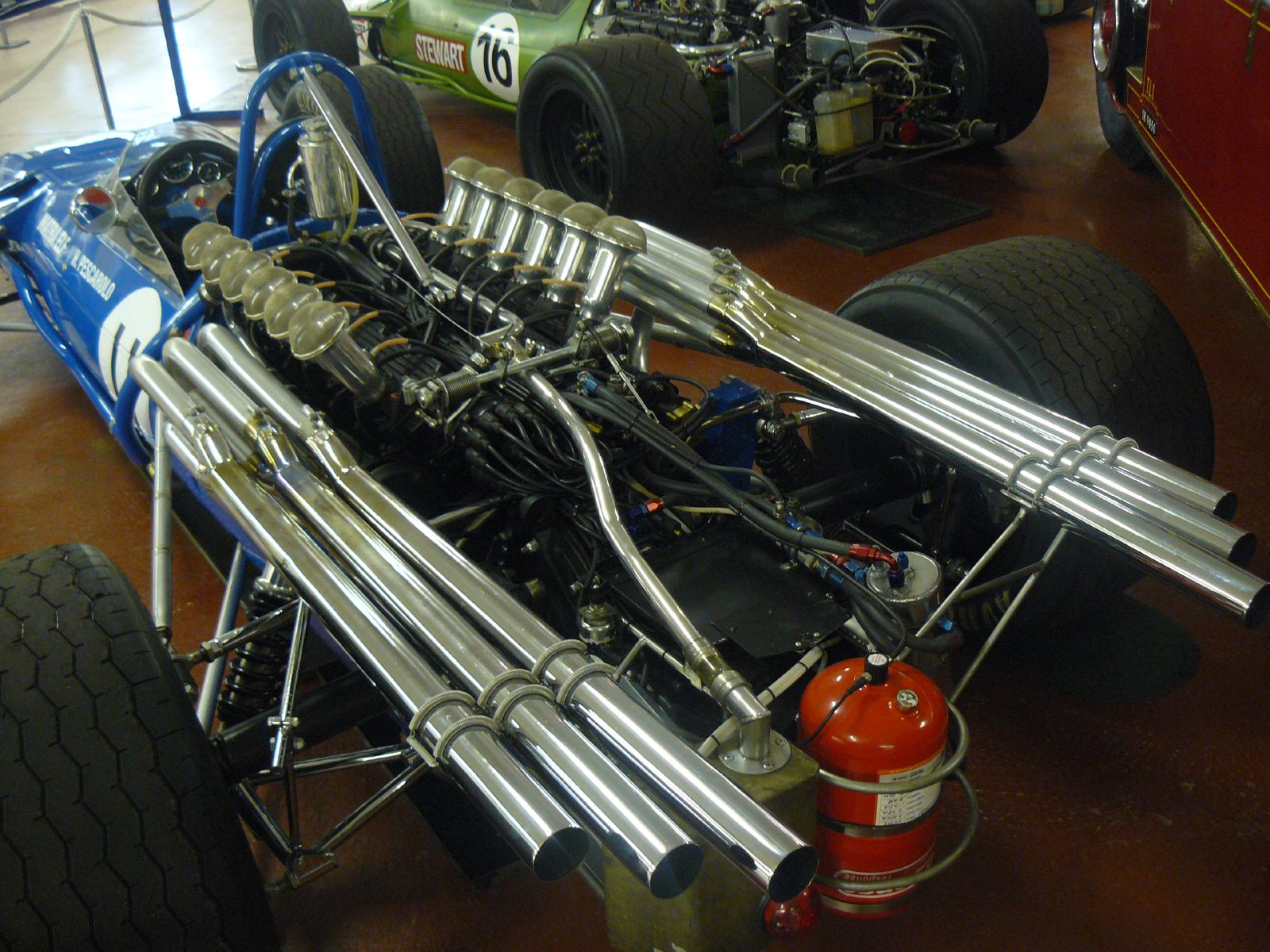
Matra V12 engine

== Complete Formula One World Championship results ==
(key) (results in bold indicate pole position; results in italics indicate fastest lap)

Year	Entrants	Drivers	1	2	3	4	5	6	7	8	9	10	11	12	Points	WCC
1968	Matra		RSA	ESP	MON	BEL	NED	FRA	GBR	GER	ITA	CAN	USA	MEX	**8**	**9th**^{1}
1968	Matra	Henri Pescarolo										Ret	DNS	9	**8**	**9th**^{1}
1968	Matra	Jean-Pierre Beltoise			Ret	8	2	9	Ret	Ret	5	Ret	Ret	Ret	**8**	**9th**^{1}
1968	Matra	Jackie Stewart							PO						**8**	**9th**^{1}

^{1} In the 1968 Constructors' Championship, Matra-Ford finished 3rd (45 points), Matra(-Matra) finished 9th (8 points)
