= Specific output =

Measure of internal combustion engine performance

Specific output is a measure of internal combustion engine performance. It describes the efficiency of an engine in terms of the brake horsepower it outputs relative to its displacement. The measure enables the comparison of differently sized engines, and is usually expressed as kilowatts or horsepower per litre or per cubic inch. On average, forced induction engines out-perform naturally aspirated engines by this measure, primarily due to their increased volumetric efficiency.

== See also ==
- Power density
- List of automotive superlatives
