= AMC AMX III =

American sports car made by American Motors Corporation

AMC AMX/3
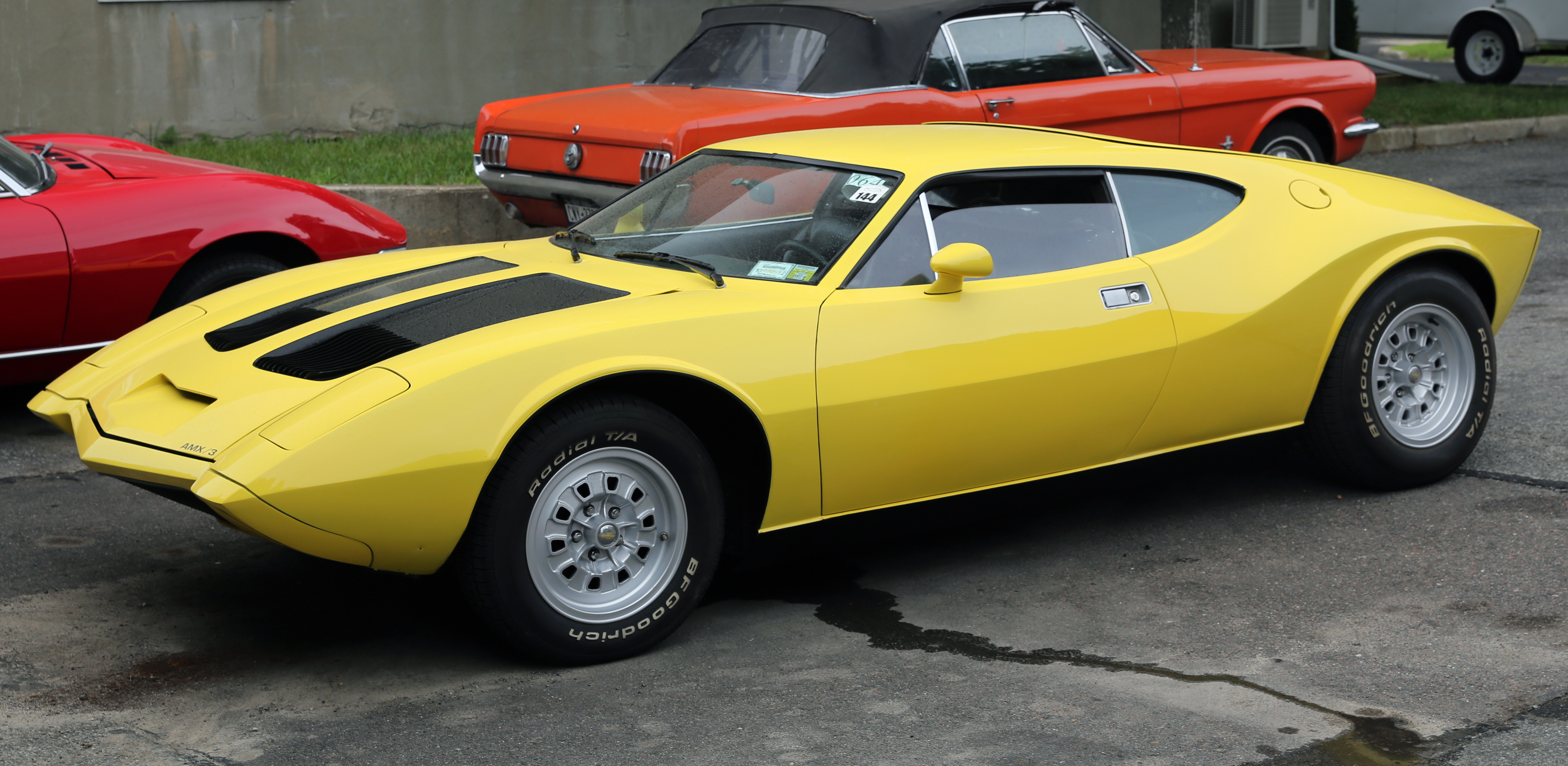
- 1970 AMC AMX/3

Overview
- Manufacturer: AMC
- Production: 1969–1970
- Designer: Dick Teague

Body and chassis
- Class: Sports car (S)
- Body style: 2-door coupé
- Layout: Rear mid-engine, rear-drive

Powertrain
- Engine: Petrol engine: 390 cu in (6.4 L) 4-bbl V8 340 hp (254 kW; 345 PS)

Dimensions
- Wheelbase: 2,675 mm (105.3 in)
- Length: 4,460 mm (175.6 in)
- Width: 1,920 mm (75.6 in)
- Height: 1,105 mm (43.5 in)
- Curb weight: 1,402 kg (3,090.9 lb)

The AMC AMX/3 (alternate spelling: AMX III) is a mid-engine sports car produced by the American carmaker American Motors Corporation (AMC), which was presented to the Italian press in March 1970 and was to be produced in Germany by Karmann starting in 1971. AMC wanted to compete with the similarly designed De Tomaso Pantera that Ford marketed in the United States. The car's body and drivetrain were originated and developed by AMC, and Dick Teague designed the car. AMC consulted and partnered with Italian suppliers to build the chassis and suspension.

The design was falsely attributed to Giotto Bizzarrini, but only specific components. Italdesign and Autocostruzioni S.D. were involved in the development. the car never reached mass production after the official presentation. After half a dozen vehicles were built, AMC abandoned the project without giving any reason.

Several attempts to revive the design were unsuccessful, including a limited production license proposal, branded as the Bizzarrini Sciabola without AMC's involvement. Later, an AMC AMX/3 chassis formed the technical basis for the 1972 Iso Varedo concept car.

== Background ==
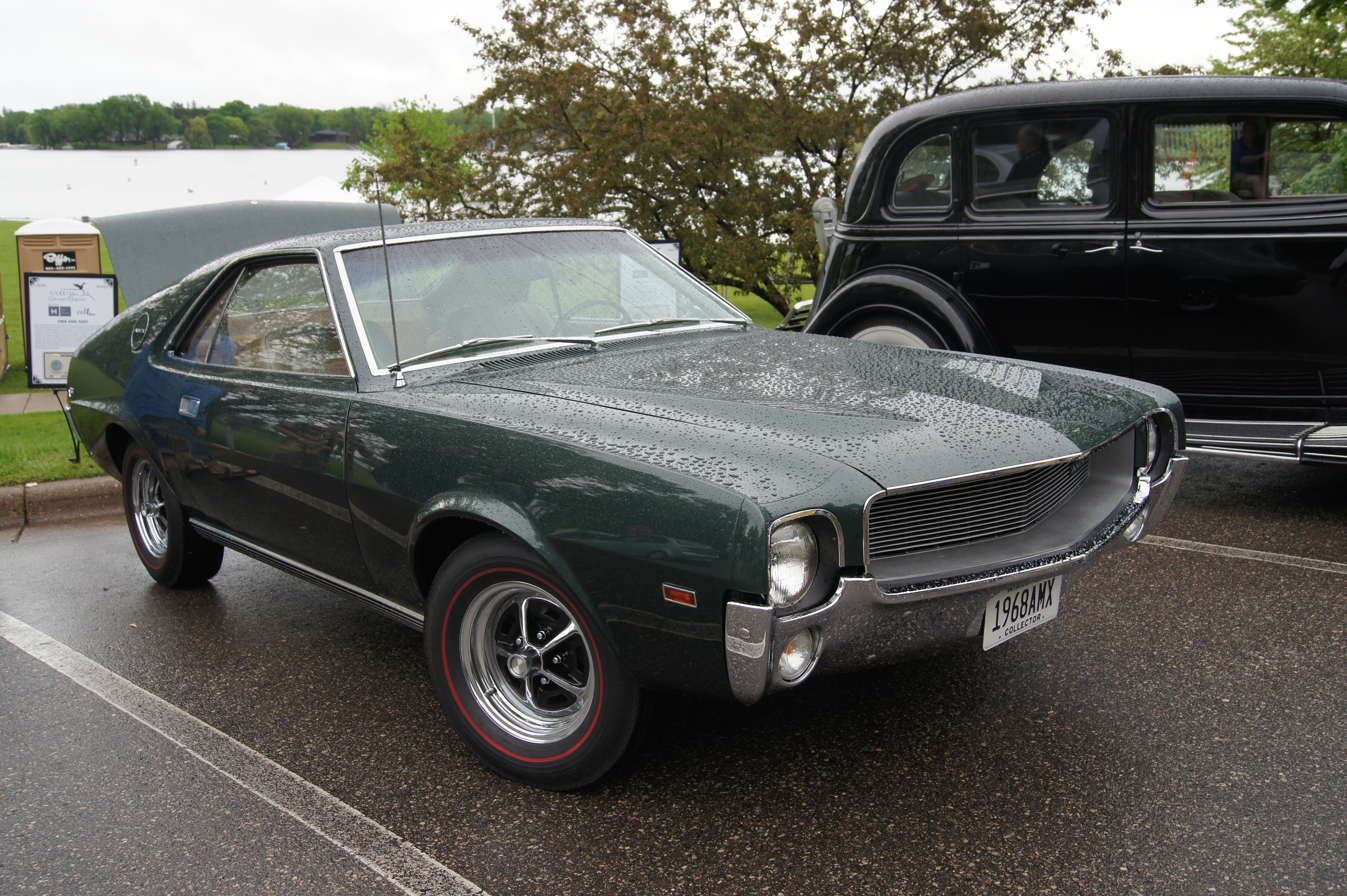
First AMX series (1968-1970)

The AMX/3 was developed partly to counter AMC's marketing and business difficulties. As the smallest of the four major American car companies, AMC had suffered significant losses in the first half of the 1960s, which was explained by an undemanding model range perceived as "staid". Near the end of the 1960s, AMC refocused on younger buyers with sporty variants of AMC's models. Introduced for the 1968 model year, the pony car Javelin was three years after the Ford Mustang, which originated the sports cars category. The Javelin-derived two-seat AMX received good reception as a muscle car, but sold less than expected. The Chevrolet Corvette was the only other two-seat car at the time with an established reputation, and possibly the AMX's stylistic proximity to the Javelin. (Note: From the fall of 1968 through 1970, the two-seat AMX production totaled 10,866 units. Starting with the 1971 through 1974 model years, the AMX became the top performance model of the four-seat Javelin. The AMX model name continued on the Hornet (1977), Concord (1978), and Spirit (1979 and 1980).)

Management had been pursuing the goal of adding a high-performance sports car with a mid-engine to the model range since 1968 to give the AMC brand a sporty image. This was triggered by the motor racing successes of the Ford GT40, which Ford used for advertising. The marketing opportunities also prompted General Motors to develop the 1968 Chevrolet XP-880, or Astro II concept car. In the spring of 1968, AMC initially showed the stylistically De Tomaso Mangusta-influenced AMC AMX/2, which was a show car with no prospect of series production. This design was further developed into the AMX/3, which was already a near-production stage.

In the autumn of 1968, the decision was made to produce the AMX/3 in series. Its primary rival was the De Tomaso Pantera, which was still in development at the time, of which it was already clear that Ford would distribute the Pantera in the United States through its dealer network. (Note: In addition to the Ford brand dealers, the Ford group maintained an independent dealer network for the higher positioned group brands Lincoln and Mercury. From 1971 until 1973, selected Lincoln-Mercury dealers sold the De Tomaso Pantera with a Ford warranty. See: Pozzi, Daniele (2015). De Tomaso: From Buenos Aires to Modena, the History of an Automotive Visionary. Dalton. p. 146. ISBN 9781854432780.)

After several prototypes were produced, AMC had promotional photos produced in March 1970 in front of the Colosseum in Rome. AMC presented the car to the Italian press in Rome on 23 March 1970 and to the American media in New York on 4 April 1970. Both events were one day before the local presentation of the De Tomaso Pantera. From 5 April 1970, the AMX/3 was displayed at the New York Auto Show, where the Pantera also debuted. In support, Giotto Bizzarrini drove a few demonstration laps at the Michigan Speedway. (Note: The time of year depends on what source is used, ether at the end of April or in the summer of 1970.) A little later, AMC abandoned the AMX/3. No reasons for the abandonment were given. By then, AMC had invested about $2 million equivalent to $15,691,517 in 2023 in the project.

== Model designation ==
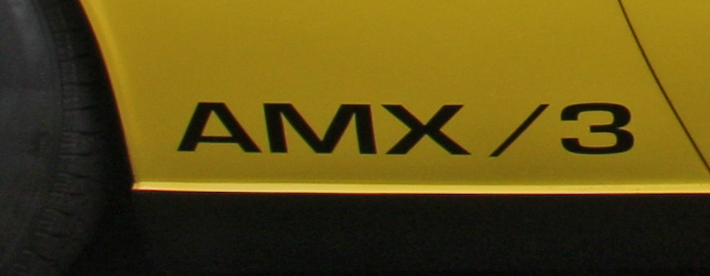
The usual lettering

The abbreviation AMX stands for American Motors Experimental (mutatis mutandis: an experimental model of the American Motors Company). From 1968 onwards, AMC used the name for a series-produced front-engined sports car. At the beginning of the development phase, the mid-engined coupé was given the designation AMX/3; it was intended as the sales designation of the production model that was not realized. The 3 - for the third experimental vehicle - was typographically mostly connected with a slash. This lettering can be found on some prototypes. However, AMC deviated from it and used the styling AMX III on one prototype. A contemporary sketch shows a vehicle with the lettering AMX/K, where the K stands for the body manufacturer Karmann.

== History of development ==
The development history of the AMC AMX/3 is not clear in details. It started with the body design, for a chassis and a body structure were constructed in further steps within seven months before a test program with several prototypes was carried out. Numerous European service providers were involved in this process, three of whom were closely connected in business at the time. Salvatore Diomante managed the automotive supplier Carbondio and, was a manager at Automobili Bizzarrini. After Bizzarrini's insolvency, Diomante took over the company's technical material and numerous design plans for Bizzarrini's cars in the insolvency proceedings and founded his company Autocostruzioni S.D. on this basis, in whose favor Carbondio was dissolved in 1969. Giorgio Giugiaro was also part of Giotto Bizzarrini's circle in the late 1960s. Both were friends with each other. When Giugiaro was looking for a technical basis for the first show car of his newly founded company, Italdesign, he chose a used Bizzarrini chassis (P 538). This became the one-off Bizzarrini Manta, unveiled in October 1968 and built at Salvatore Diomante's Carbondio company in the summer of 1968. With the AMX/3, Bizzarrini, Diomante, and Giugiaro continued their association.

=== Planning at AMC ===
The decision to outsource the development and production of the AMX/3 to European operations was made for financial reasons. Management hoped to keep production and sales prices low in this way. Series production was to be undertaken by the German coachbuilder Karmann, who, in Rheine, had been assembling AMC Javelins destined for Europe since 1968 from disassembled parts kits. The schematics called for increasing production of the AMX/3 to 1,000, after an initial run of 24 cars, and according to other sources, as many as 5,000 annually. They would be marketed in the U.S. and Europe. Other sources suggest that AMC initially targeted building 5,000 cars annually and later reduced this to 24 cars yearly. The projected list price was to be US$10,000 to $12,000 . This would be approximately double that of the FR layout base model Chevrolet Corvette (C3). A more equivalent two-seat car, a Ferrari 365 GTB/4 "Daytona", was offered for US$19,900.

=== AMC design center ===
The AMX/3's body design was completed in the spring of 1968 and was credited to AMC's design studio, headed by Richard "Dick" Teague. The detailed work was done by Vince Geraci, Jack Kenitz, Chuck Mashigan, and Robert "Bob" Nixon. Teague suggested in later years that "a lot of work" had been outsourced to the specialist Creative Industries of Detroit during the development process, but did not elaborate on any specific instances. A clay mock-up was crafted in a design studio leased by AMC at the company's East Outer Drive facility.

In the autumn of 1968, a 1:1 model made of glass-fiber reinforced plastic, known as the Pushmobile, was created from the designs of the AMC designers. It was not roadworthy, had no engine, no steering, and no interior, and was held together inside by a metal framework. (Note: This Pushmobile exists; it has been in California since about 2007.) After its completion, it was contrasted in a design competition with an alternative proposal by Giorgio Giugiaro's Studio Italdesign, which had been created under time pressure in parallel with the Bizzarrini Manta show car and was perceived as "heavy and immature" or "unfinished and loveless". In the end, the AMC design won.

=== Bizzarrini and Italdesign ===
Because AMC had only front-engine, rear-wheel-drive production cars in its 1960s lineup, the AMX/3, designed as a mid-engine car, could not build on existing production technology. "For lack of own know-how" AMC sought to have it designed by an external specialist, using European service providers (mainly for cost reasons). In the early planning phase, AMC considered having the AMX/3 constructed entirely by BMW, but this failed due to a lack of capacity at BMW. On Pininfarinas or Karmanns AMC then entered into an association in November 1968 with the engineer Giotto Bizzarrini, who had been building racing and sports cars for Alfa Romeo, Ferrari, A.T.S., Lamborghini, and Iso. He designed his brand and a reputation of being one of the best automotive engineers in Italy. Bizzarrini, who had lost his business to bankruptcy a month earlier, then worked as a freelance designer for AMC. He produced the first drawings for chassis parts as early as December 1968. AMC then promoted the AMX/3 as a Bizzarrini design. However, Bizzarrini's contributions are limited to individual components of the car. Giotto Bizzarrini later stated that AMC had asked him for "a chassis and suspension." However, only the suspension has been proven to be a Bizzarrini design. On the other hand, the frame was developed by Giorgio Giugiaro's company Italdesign, which saw itself as a design studio and a construction service provider. On whose initiative Italdesign became involved and how the labor was divided with Bizzarrini is unclear. Italdesign's involvement lasted from December 1968 until June 1969. However, AMC did not make it public.

=== Autocostruzioni S.D. (Diomante) ===
AMC initially commissioned the Turin coachbuilder Coggiola to build the prototypes. Coggiola began work on the first AMX/3 in late autumn of 1968, but did not finish it. For unknown reasons, prototype construction was transferred at the turn of 1968/69 to the newly founded company Autofficina Salvatore Diomante, renamed Autocostruzioni S.D. The firm is also commonly known as Diomante. Its founder, Salvatore Diomante, had been plant manager at Automobili Bizzarini until 1968. Diomante was first based at the previous Bizzarrini plant in Livorno. It was here - possibly based on Coggiola's preliminary work - that the first prototype of the AMX/3 was built in the spring of 1969. Diomante later moved operations to Moncalieri near Turin; all the remaining AMX/3s were built there.

=== BMW ===
Test drives and the revision of the chassis were eventually commissioned to BMW, where the project was given the development code E18. BMW undertook test drives with the first prototype starting in June 1969 and found significant deficiencies. The chassis proved to be too weakly designed so that it deformed equally under strong acceleration and strong deceleration. In addition, the straight-line running was poor, and the engine's cooling was insufficient. Bizzarrini revised the chassis, and the cooling system was modified as well. The second prototype, which was probably delivered to BMW in late summer of 1969, was significantly improved in the testers' opinion. BMW's involvement ended in January 1970 after AMC stopped funding the test program.

Unlike Italdesign's involvement, BMW's participation in the development of the AMX/3 was already discussed in the contemporary Italian and English-language press.

== Technical description ==
=== Chassis and suspension ===
The AMX/3 has a semi-monocoque with a central center beam and box sills. This distinguishes the car from Giotto Bizzarrini's earlier designs, many of which have a tube frame. All wheels have independent suspension on double wishbones. The rear lower wishbones are trapezoidal, and the wheel carriers (stub axle and hub plate) are cast from aluminum. Each wheel has coil springs and telescopic shock absorbers; the rear tires each have dual coil-over shocks. The shock absorbers were built by the Dutch manufacturer Koni. The brake system with four disc brakes came from Girling. They were replaced by a system from Alfred Teves (ATE) after the first tests at BMW in the summer of 1969. The weight distribution is 43:57. The front tires are specified as 205/70 VR 15, and the rear tires as 225/70 VR 15.

=== Body ===
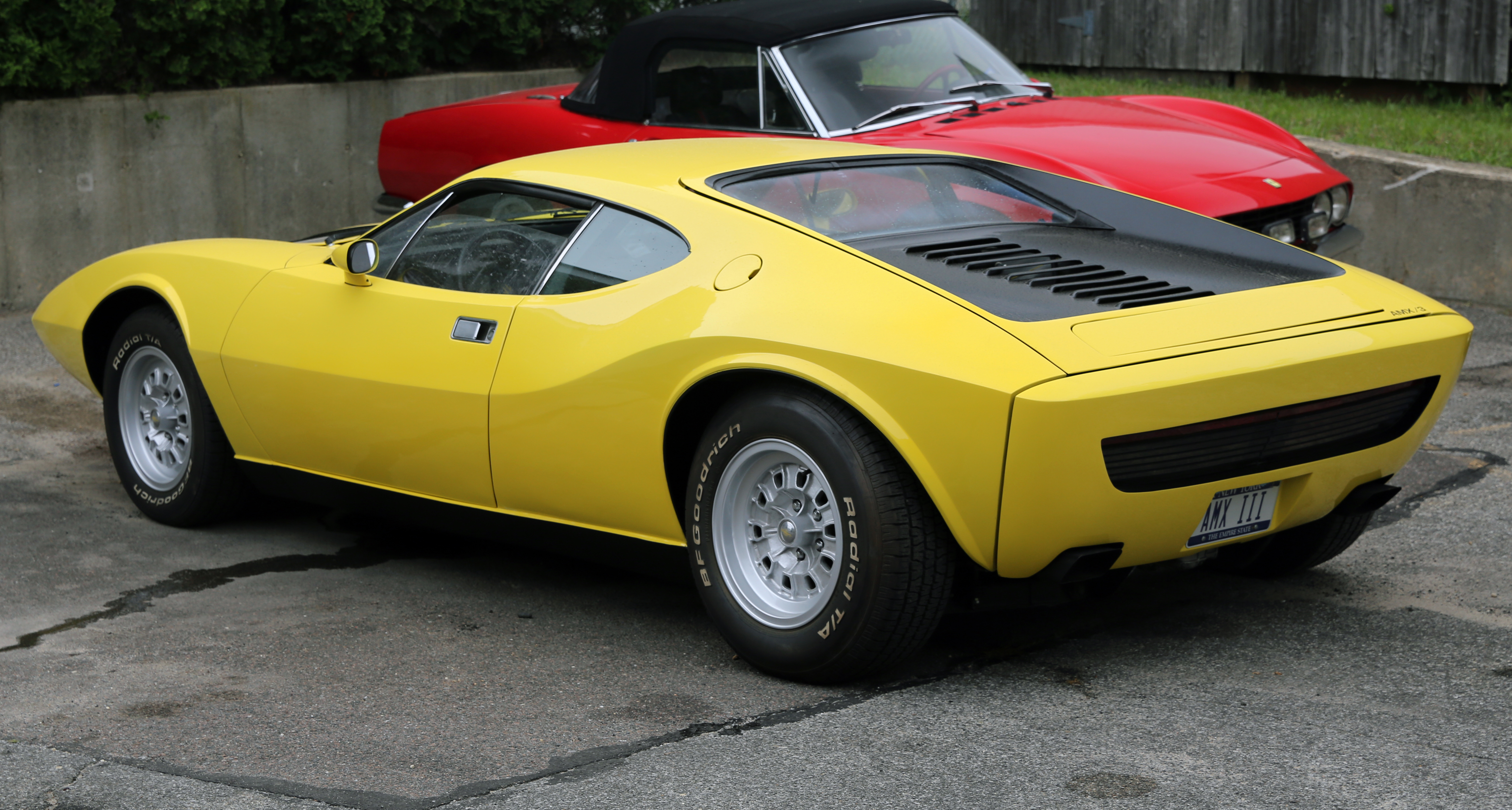
AMX/3 (fifth prototype)

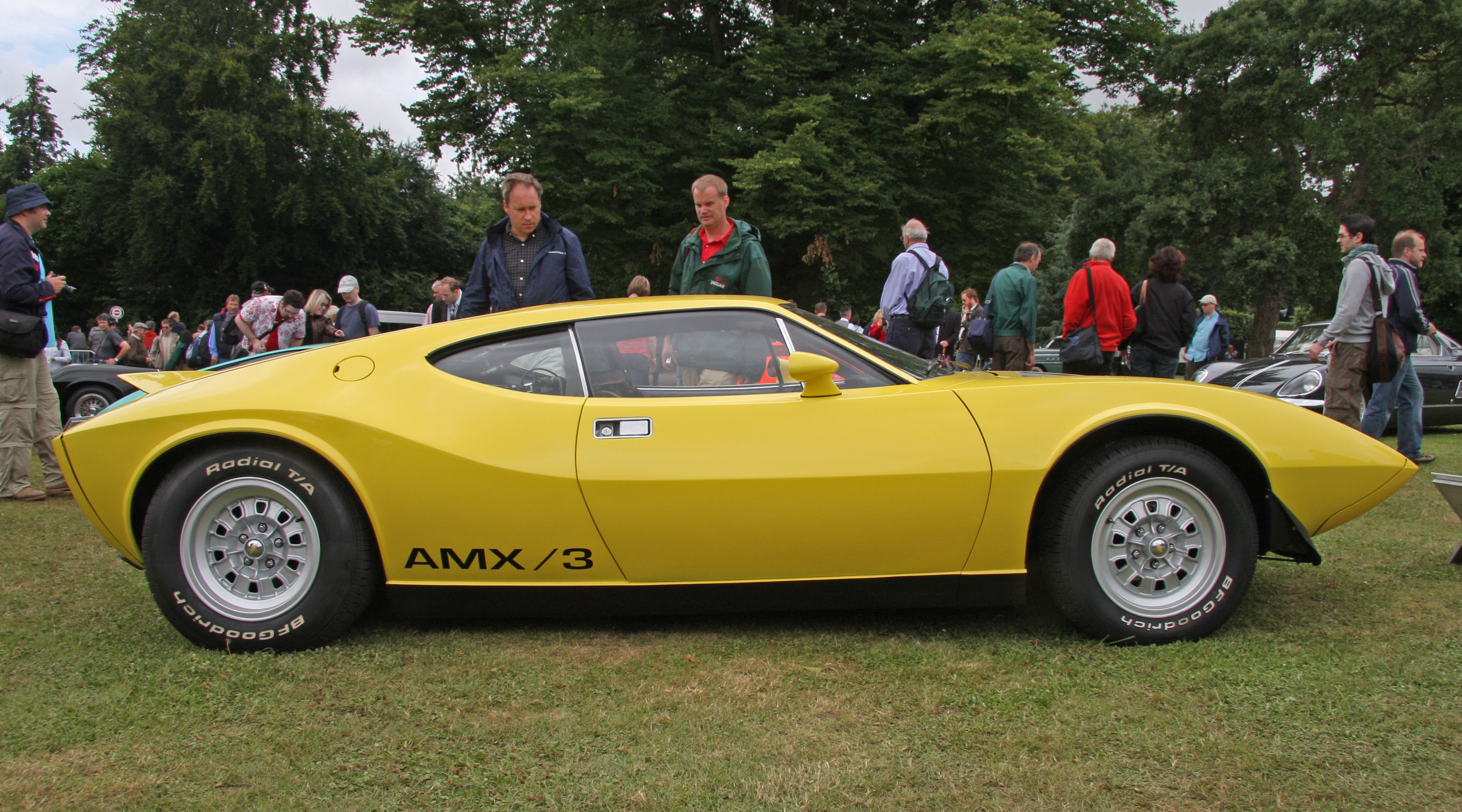
Short rear overhang, two-piece side window: the original AMX/3 design

The handcrafted sheet steel hatchback body is joined to the floor pan to form a self-supporting unibody. With a height of 1.10 m, it is very flat, but exceptionally wide at 1.92 metres (6.3 ft).

The design of the AMX/3 is described as "dramatic" The most striking design details are the profiled fenders and the pronounced sweep over the rear wheels. The AMC designers took the basic idea from the Studio GT, a prototype designed by the Italian coachbuilder Neri e Bonacini in 1966 and first shown in 1968. He also provided the model for the tapered side windows towards the rear. The nose of the vehicle is angled. The extensions of the front fenders protrude, and the central part of the front fairing is pointed like an arrow. Inserted into the fenders are flip-up headlights. The hood is strongly subdivided: to the left and right of a bar painted in body color, it has openings for the radiators in black. On some, but not all, vehicles, there is another transversely oriented air intake opening in front of it. It was not included in the original design by the AMC designers. Some prototypes had round tail lights from the Fiat 850 at the rear. Richard Teague partially replaced them later with narrow, horizontally arranged tail lights, which were adopted from the Pontiac Firebird of the second series (AMX/3 No. 5). The large tailgate, which incorporates the engine cover and rear window, is hinged at the rear of the vehicle and is held open by two gas struts. A retractable wing was provided at the rear, but this was not realized on any of the prototypes. Diomante installed dummies on some, but not all, of the cars. However, at least one vehicle (No. 5) later received a functional rear wing during restoration work.

During 1969, AMC revised the design of the AMX/3 in several areas. The rear overhang was slightly extended for technical reasons. The hood was redesigned to cover the windshield wipers when turned off. The side windows in the doors are now one-piece, i.e., without triangular front quarter glass. Diomante implemented these changes only on cars produced after AMC's withdrawal but only on some. These changes are on the fourth and sixth AMX/3s as well as the subsequently completed seventh car, but not on the fifth prototype.

=== Drivetrain ===
==== Engine ====
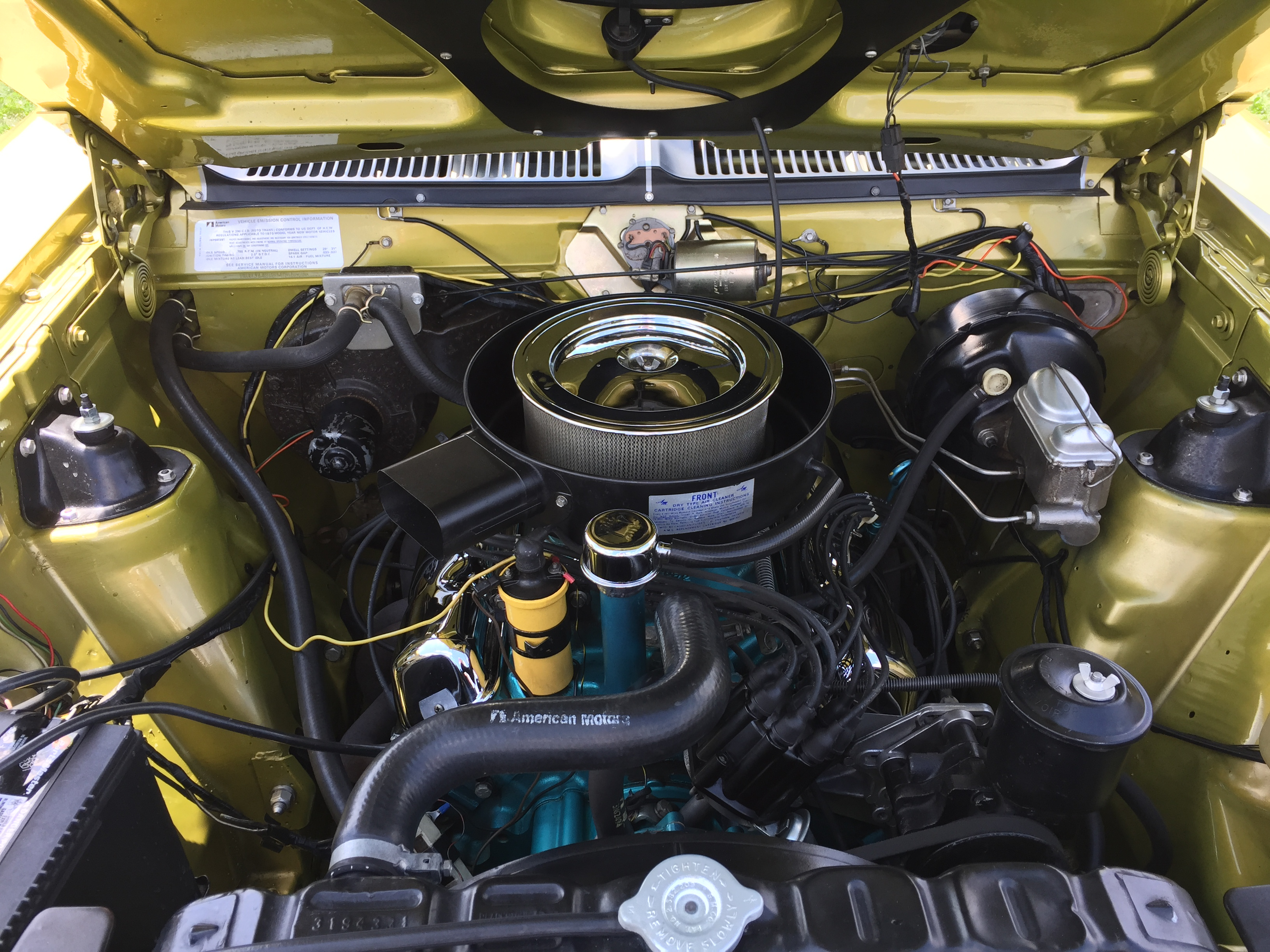
6.4-litre eight-cylinder AMC "Machine" engine

The AMX/3 is powered by AMC V8 engines mounted longitudinally in mid-engine position between the seats and the rear axle.

The engine block is of gray cast iron. The forged crankshaft has five bearings. The engine has a central camshaft. The engine is short-stroke (bore × stroke: 105.79 × 90.77 mm); the displacement is 390 cu in (6.4 L). The Machine version has a four-barrel carburetor from Carter. The compression ratio is 10 : 1. The engine, tested under SAE J245/J1995, developed 340 hp (254 kW) at 5100 rpm and 430 lb⋅ft (583 N⋅m) of torque at 3600 rpm. Measured with the standard DIN 70020 used in Europe at the time, the engine power corresponds to around 295 hp (217 kW). Two electric fans supplement the radiator mounted in the front of the car. The Behr fans were added during the testing process.

Series production of the 390 engine ended in 1970; after that, AMC used a slightly enlarged, 401 cu in (6,573 cc; 6.6 L), version in its muscle cars, with a gross power output of 330 hp (246 kW) according to SAE-J245/J1995 tests.

The first prototype was also used on a trial basis during autumn of 1969, with a BMW eight-cylinder engine from the M09 series (which was still under development) equipped and tested in Italy. The 4.5-liter engine, with around 240 hp (179 kW) according to DIN 70020, was mentioned as an alternative engine for the prospective European version of the AMX/3.

==== Gearbox ====
Most of the AMX/3 have a transmission made by Oto Melara, a subsidiary of the Italian state-owned IRI, which is primarily active in the armament sector. It has four gears that can be shifted manually and is united with the differential in one housing. One car has a manual five-speed transmission from ZF fitted instead.

=== Driving performance ===
The development of the AMX/3 was based on the management's target that the car had to reach a top speed of at least 160 mph (260 km/h). The first prototype did not meet these requirements. With the original shape, the car had too much lift, and at high speeds, it raised the front of the car. Initially, only 145 mph (233 km/h) was achieved as the top speed, although the engine had ample power for higher performance. Three months later, Giotto Bizzarrini and the racing driver Antonio Nieri tried out different front spoilers during test drives with the second prototype. With the spoilers, the second AMX/3 reached a top speed of 170 mph (270 km/h) at the Autodromo Nazionale Monza. Nieri's fastest lap time in the AMX/3 was 1:56 min at Monza. The car thus equaled the values achieved a few years earlier by a Bizzarrini GT 5300.

== Original vehicles ==
In February 1969, Diomante began building the AMX/3 vehicles. How many cars were built and which are to be regarded as original vehicles has yet to be fully clarified.

In 1971, Giotto Bizzarrini spoke of three AMX/3s being completed and two other cars almost finished at AMC's withdrawal. He did not mention any other vehicles or chassis. Deviating from this, most sources today assume not five, but six original AMX/3s, to which several younger cars, inconsistently estimated in detail, were added. This is based on the assumption that by the time AMC withdrew in the spring of 1970, Diomante had largely completed a tranche of five cars - including three road-ready prototypes - and had begun building five more chassis. Of the second tranche, at least one more car was completed shortly afterward. (Note: Brand biographer Philippe Olczyk (Bizzarrini & Diomante. The Official History, 3rd edition 2017, ISBN 978-84-697-6659-0) also concludes that there were six original chassis, but assigns them without exception to 1971 on pp. 325 ff. This cannot be reconciled with the other sources. With this attribution, Olczyk also indirectly contradicts his statements on p. 123 f. in the same book.) Furthermore, at least three other cars are associated with the AMX/3, allegedly based on the original chassis. These cars are not consistently recognized in the literature as original AMX/3. Another question is whether new chassis were still being produced after 1970.

The following vehicles can be distinguished:

=== Six originals ===
==== No. 1: First prototype ====
The first prototype AMX/3, originally painted light green, was built in spring 1969. The car has no chassis number. Diomante manufactured its essential parts in Livorno from March 1969, though Diomante's mechanics did not complete it until June 1969 at BMW in Munich. After that, not the first and the second, but the third and the fifth cars were delivered to BMW for testing. With it, BMW carried out a test program from June to at least September 1969. At the end of 1969, the car returned to Diomante, where it was stored in incomplete condition (possibly as a parts donor for other AMX/3s) for a few years. Around 1973, AMC took over the chassis without a gearbox and engine and imported it to the United States. There, it passed through several collectors' hands; restoration of the now yellow-painted car began after another change of ownership in late 2019. It is currently owned by a Michigan resident and was shown at the 2019 Muscle Car and Corvette Nationals show in Chicago, Illinois (where it won several awards).

==== No. 2: The "Red Monza Car" ====
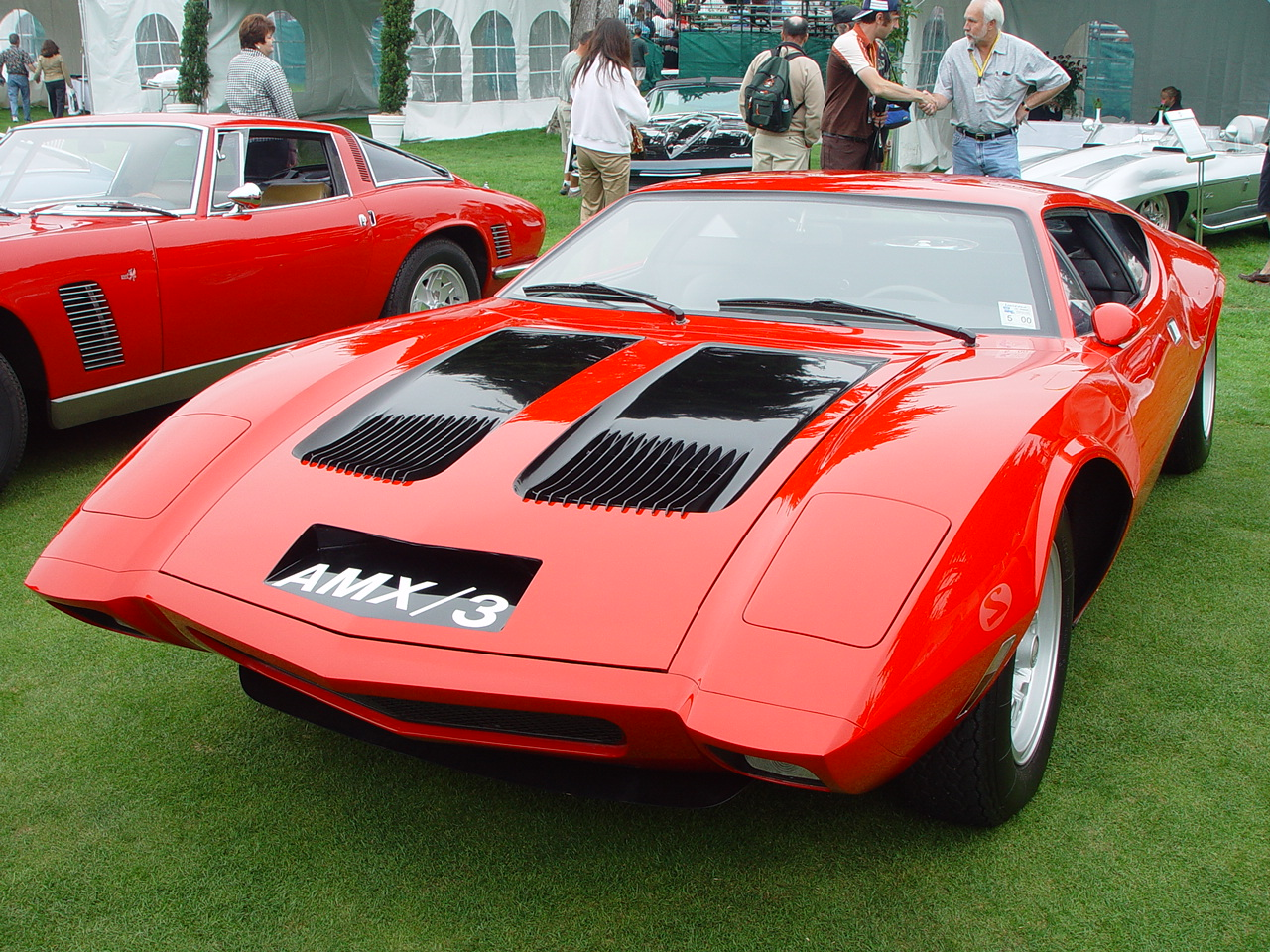
The second AMX/3 prototype, with additional openings for cooling air

The second prototype was built in the summer of 1969, bearing the chassis number WTDO 363 2/55/55. The car was referred to in AMC internal parlance as the "Red Monza Car". Stylistically, the Monza car is essentially, but not entirely, the same as the first prototype. Key exterior distinguishing features are large air vents recessed into the wings in front of the rear wheel arches to improve cooling and the horizontal air intake in the front fascia. Also new were the side position lights in the front and rear wings (Side Marker Lights), which the first prototype lacked in its original version. When designing the chassis of the second prototype, Bizzarrini took up the findings that the test drives with the first car had produced and implemented BMW's recommendations.

From late 1969 (according to other sources: early 1970,) the car went to BMW, where further tests were carried out. BMW certified that the vehicle had significantly better torsional strength. In the spring of 1970, Bizzarrini organized speed tests with this chassis at the Autodromo Nazionale Monza. These tests are responsible for the designation of this vehicle. In February 1971, an Italian magazine tested the "Red Monza Car" in the Turin area.

Shortly afterward, Diomante sold the car for US$6,000 to a collector who imported it into the U.S. in November 1971. A sales document issued by Diomante incorrectly states the year of manufacture as 1967. After several ownership changes, the car was restored in 1990 in California. Since then, it first appeared in red livery at classic car exhibitions. After a further revision in 2015, the car wears the contemporary AMC color "bittersweet orange". In January 2017, it sold for a price of $891,000 at a classic car auction. This was the highest price ever for an AMC-branded car.

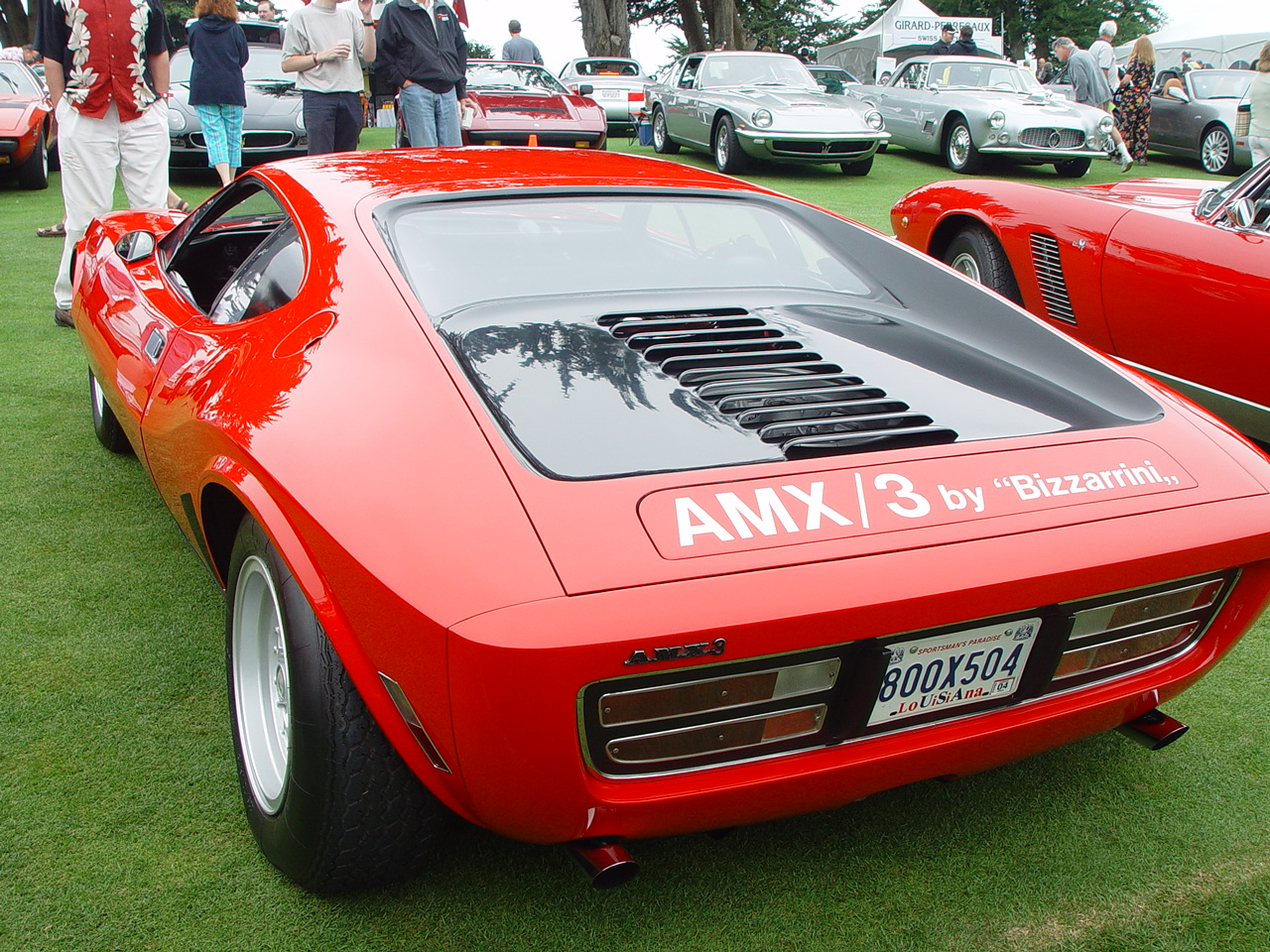
AMC AMX3 rear - Flick - Concorso Italiano 2004

==== No. 3: Exhibit ====
The third AMX/3 (chassis number A0M397X631524Y) was completed in early 1970. Stylistically, it corresponds entirely to the first prototype from 1969. the car has no side air intakes in the rear wings and no horizontal air intake in the front bonnet. However, the side marker lights in the fenders are consistent with the second prototype. It is the first car in which the interior was also finished to the later series standard; the earlier cars initially had only provisional interiors.

In red livery, the car was photographed for publicity pictures in front of the Roman Colosseum in March 1970 and subsequently shown at press launches in Rome and New York and at the New York Auto Show in April 1970. AMC also featured the car in its Annual Report for 1970. In the following years, it remained with AMC. In 1978, it was taken over by Teague, whose family still owns it. The car has been loaned to U.S. museums.

==== No. 4: The "Turin Car" ====
The fourth AMX/3 (chassis number WTDO 363 4/55/55) was referred to in AMC internal parlance as the "Torino Car". It was the first AMX/3 to feature the styling changes from autumn 1969 through late June 1970 - one-piece side windows, extended rear, and raised cowling. Diomante completed it after AMC's withdrawal of project funding in the second half of 1970; however, it was assembled from components already created in the winter of 1969–70. In October 1970, AMC exhibited car No. 4 at the Turin Motor Show. After the AMC exhibition, the term Bizzarrini Sciabola was discussed as a possible model designation. In 1971, the car was bought by a collector and imported to the United States.

==== No. 5: Direct to AMC ====
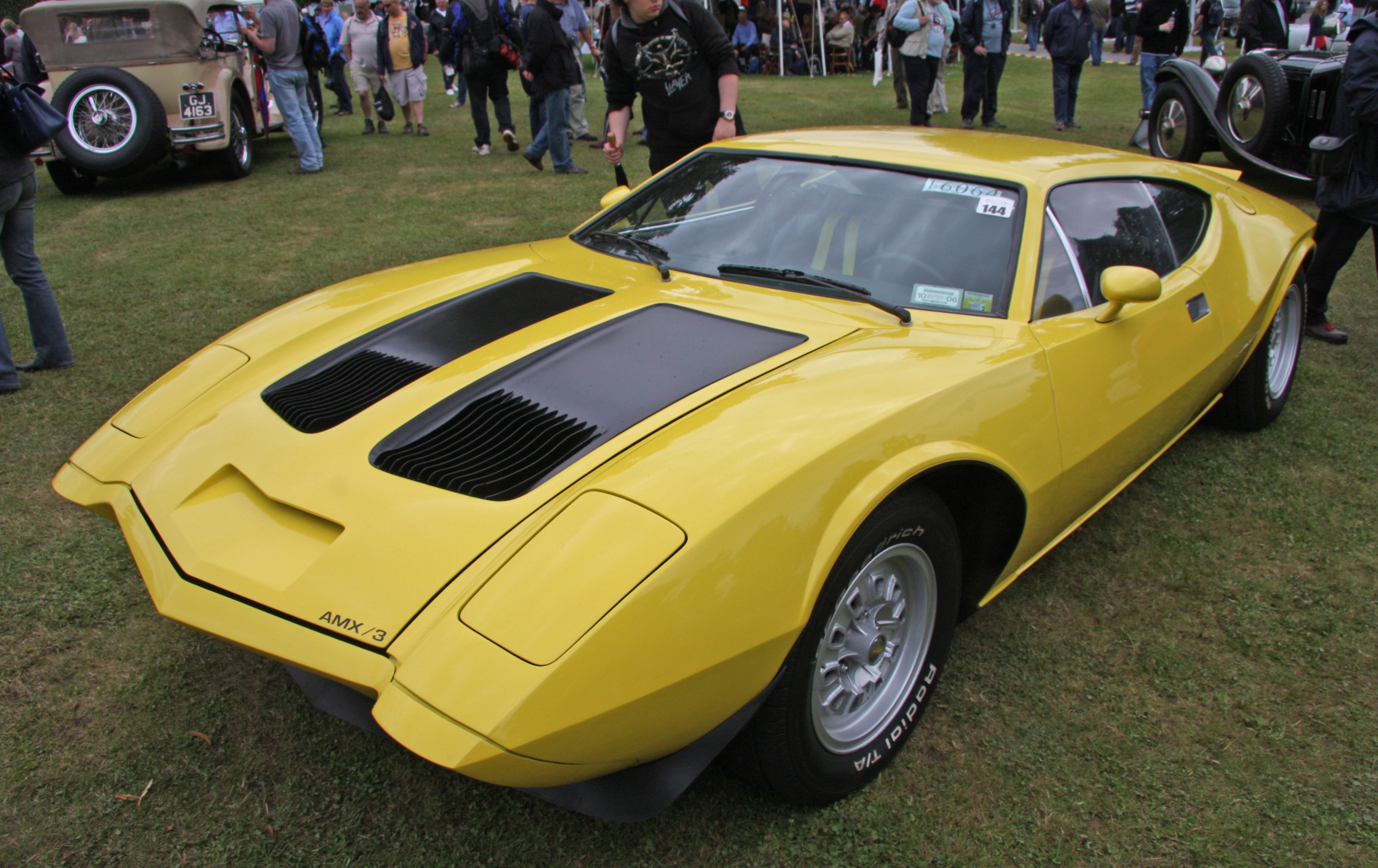
AMX/3, Chassis No. 5

The fifth car (chassis number A0M397X680492) was completed about the same time as the fourth; July to September 1970, when AMC withdrew project funding. The car corresponds to the original, early AMC design, the car has side triangular windows in the doors and the short rear. Unlike the second, third, and fourth cars, the fifth AMX/3 has no side marker lights.

The car was complete and still in Italy by mid-late 1970. It appeared in the January 1971 issue of the Italian magazine Quattroruote. American Motors imported the fifth car to the U.S. in 1973, along with the first car and 28 transaxles. In 1978, Teague bought this car, made stylistic changes to the taillights, and began converting the dash gauges from European to American but left the gauges unfinished. Among other things, he had blacked-out second-generation Pontiac Firebird taillights installed upside down, which were still on the car in 2019. In 2006, the car was restored, and in the process, it received a black-painted front spoiler. The fifth car also had a retractable rear wing similar to cars 2, 3, and 4. Since 2006, the yellow-painted car has been shown at irregular intervals in the United States and Europe.

==== No. 6: The Sciabola ====
The sixth car was running and drivable by the end of 1970, but only fully completed early in 1971. It is also assumed to be based on parts already manufactured in 1970. Therefore, it is recognized as the original AMX/3. The body of the sixth AMX/3 has the 1969 modifications to the rear and side windows. However, like the first and third prototypes, the horizontal air intake in the front fairing is missing. Unlike the earlier cars, the sixth car has hardly any AMC accessories in the interior. Many components come from Fiat and Bertone instead. This applies to switches, instruments, and double-round rear lights (Fiat 850). The sixth AMX/3 still belongs to Salvatore Diomante. It was exhibited at the 1976 Turin Motor Show as the Bizzarrini Sciabola and photographed for a Sciabola brochure. This is the only car with the OTO-Melara transmission. In 1981, Richard Teague expressed the opinion that the sixth AMX/3 was the best car of the whole series: "a real gem".

=== Replicas on the original chassis ===
==== No. 7: A straggler ====
The seventh chassis, built as early as 1970, remained unused. Salvatore Diomante sold the incomplete car in 1971 to Giorgio Giordanengo, who had a business restoring classic Italian sports cars. Giordanengo finished the car as late as the 1980s. Stylistically, the body corresponds to the sixth vehicle. Diomante sold No. 7 around 1992 to Belgian entrepreneur Roland D'Ieteren, then the managing director of the Brussels D'Ieteren Group. This car has since been restored and completed around 1998.

==== No. 8: Iso Varedo ====
The eighth chassis did not receive an AMX/3 body. In late 1971, Giotto Bizzarrini constructed the Varedo show car for ISO Rivolta. The chassis featured plastic bodywork based on the Lamborghini Countach and was designed by Ercole Spada. Unlike the AMX/3 models, the Varedo has a Ford Cleveland V8 engine, making it similar to Iso Rivolta's production cars. The Varedo debuted at the 1972 Turin Motor Show. The one-off vehicle belongs to Iso's former owner, Piero Rivolta, and it is at the Sarasota Classic Car Museum in Florida.

==== No. 9: AMX Spyder ====
The AMX/3 is claimed to be associated with a Spyder that appeared at the 2002 Bizzarrini Expo in Brussels. The car's documentation states it is an "AMX Spider," it was labeled at the Brussels Expo as a “Bizzarrini P538,” and the Expo catalog lists it as “AMX Spider” The car is based on the ninth and last known original chassis of the AMX/3 series, which was sold after 1971 by Bizzarrini to Giorgio Giordanengo, the owner of the no. 7 car. Giordanengo then finished the Spyder body originally started by Bizzarrini, which has no references to the AMX/3 and resembles the earlier Bizzarrini P538. Unlike the regular AMX/3 vehicles, the Spyder originally received a Chevrolet 5.4 L V8 engine in the style of the P538. It was bought by Roland D'Ieteren in 1992, and by 1995, it was restored and completed with an AMC 390 cu in (6.4 L) V8 engine. It has a ZF five-speed manual gearbox. However, some dispute the Spider's connection to the AMX/3. This is because the wheelbase and track of the Spider match AMX/3 specifications. However, experts have not proven these claims, nor can it be discounted as an original AMX/3 chassis.

== Revivals after AMC withdrawal: Bizzarrini Sciabola ==
After AMC withdrew from the project in July 1970, there were several attempts to revive the AMX/3 as the Bizzarrini AMX/3 or Bizzarrini Sciabola.

=== 1970: 30 Bizzarrinis without AMC ===
In the summer of 1970, AMC was prepared to let Bizzarrini build 30 AMX/3s, 20 of which were to be sold in Europe under the Bizzarrini brand, while ten others were to be supplied to AMC. Subsequently, Bizzarrini exhibited an AMX/3 on its stand at the Turin Motor Show in October 1970. (Note: Blaube, p. 49 moves the presentation of the Bizzarrini Sciabola to 1971. This is inconsistent with the other available sources and, incidentally, also contradicts Blaube's accounts elsewhere in the same article, where it explicitly states that the Sciabola project had already failed in September 1971 - two months before the 1971 Turin Motor Show.) This was the Torino Car called the fourth AMX/3. Bizzarrini was using the model name Sciabola (English: Sabre) at this stage.

Giotto Bizzarrini explained that he had not accepted AMC's offer to produce the AMX/3 on his responsibility because he had "not had the courage" or because he did not want to produce the AMX/3 himself, the memory of Automobili Bizzarrini's insolvency was present. At the beginning of 1971, AMC had refused the promised delivery of technical components for the cars without giving any reasons and had demanded the scrapping of all AMX/3 models. Diomante had destroyed the nine cars made from the summer of 1970 onwards, but not the original prototypes he had built up to 1970.

=== 1976: Bizzarrini and Oto Melara: The Sciabola ===
In 1976 (Note: The book by Philippe Olczyk (Bizzarrini & Diomante. The Official History, 3rd edition 2017, ISBN 978-84-697-6659-0, p. 124) mentioned 1975 could not be correct: there was no Turin Motor Show in 1975. From 1972 to 1984, the Salon was held biennially in even years.) Giotto Bizzarrini exhibited a sports car called the Sciabola at the Turin Motor Show and published a sales brochure. The car presented was the sixth chassis of the AMX/3, which had been completed by Diomante in early 1971 and had been kept in Turin ever since. No further development over the original AMX/3 versions was apparent. The exhibition of the Sciabola was primarily financed by Oto Melara and aimed to present the car as an advertising medium for Oto Melara gearboxes. Giotto Bizzarrini announced to the Italian press that the Sciabola would be handcrafted to order for $23,800. However, production did not materialize. Chassis No. 6 is owned by Salvatore Diomante.

== Influences of the AMX/3 on later AMC models ==
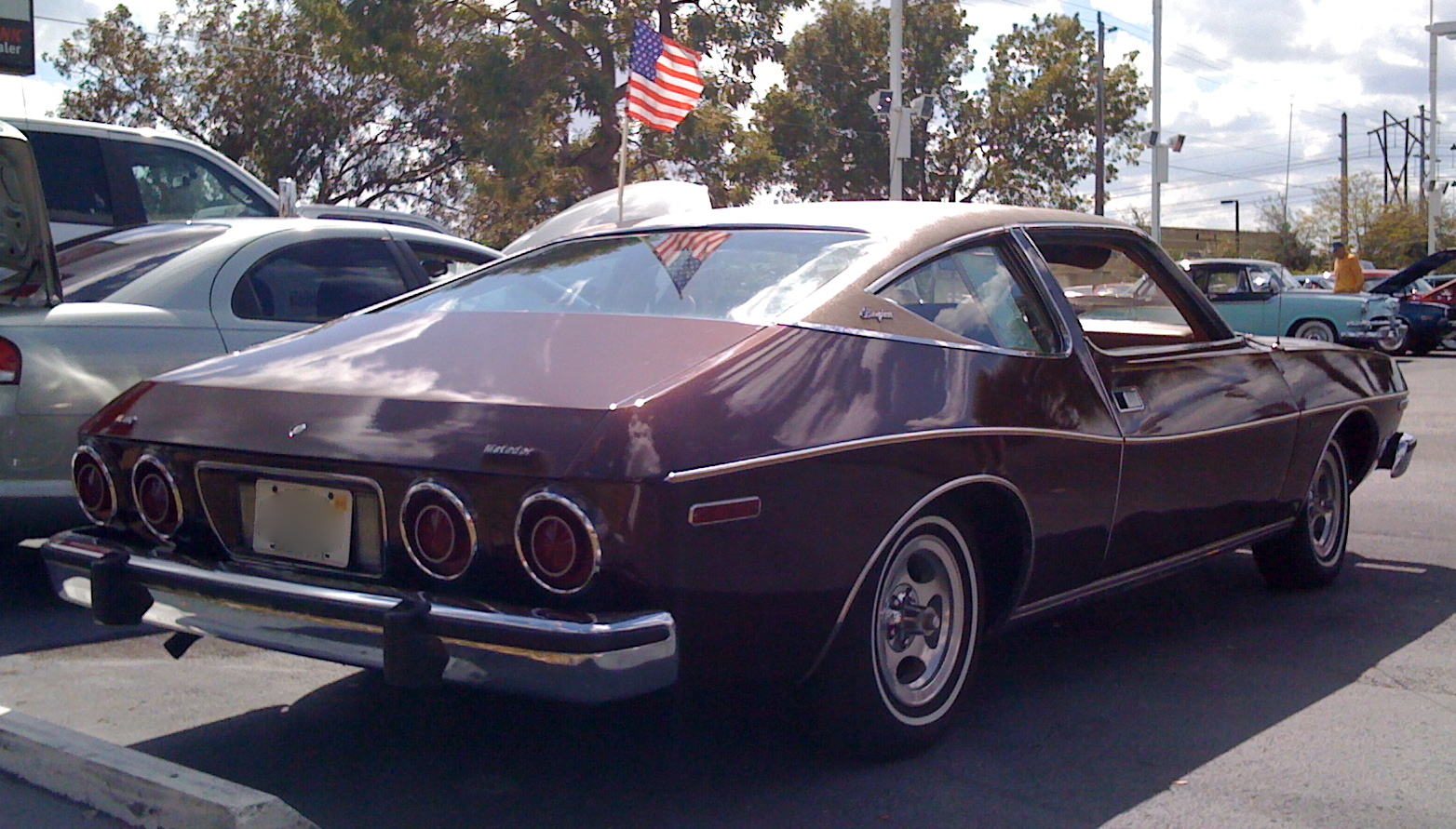
AMC Matador Coupé

The lines of the AMX/3 influenced the design of some of AMC's later production models. This is especially true of the distinctive hip sweep in the rear wings.

For the 1973 model year, AMC first introduced the three-door hatchback version of the Hornet compact model, whose rear wings quoted the hip sweep of the AMX/3 in a toned-down form. The rear side windows taper to a point. In the autumn of 1973, the second edition of the Matador Coupé debuted. Designed under the direction of Richard Teague, the hatchback coupe has AMX/3-inspired lines on the rear wings, which are more widely displayed than the Hornet. Also comparable are the rear side windows, which were tapered in the original design but, in later years, were covered by a vinyl cover on some versions. Elements of the AMX/3 appearance were also incorporated in the completely redesigned 1974 Matador coupe. The U.S. magazine Car and Driver pictured the Matador coupe on the cover of the November 1973 issue and named it as the "Best Styled Car of 1974".

== Reception ==
Although the AMX/3 did not reach the mass production stage, it is not considered a "failure". Many - including Richard Teague himself - consider the AMX/3 the best design Teague realized at AMC. For his part, Giotto Bizzarrini believes that the AMX/3 is his best design. In some quarters, it has been suggested that mass production of the AMX/3 could have brought AMC many new customers and possibly saved the corporation. In 2017, Thomas Glatch of SportsCarMarket wrote:

"This car was a milestone. It was born out of a unique project that brought together some of the brightest minds in the automotive world of the late 1960s and 1970s."

== Inspirations and revivals ==
The California-registered company Sciabola Inc. has been trying to develop a replica of the AMX/3 since 2007. The company produced several bodyshells directly derived from the plastic model of the AMX/3 shown in 1969. However, more funding was needed to develop the technology. There is no record of any sales of the new AMX/3 bodies.

Richard Teague's son Jeff, who is also an industrial designer and has worked for Ford, among others, designed the AMX/4 concept car and in 2010, the AMX/5. Both vehicles are intended as homages to the AMX/3 and are said to be an evolution of its design concept. A plastic model was built; however, series production was not intended.

== Technical data ==
AMC AMX/3
Engine:	Eight-cylinder gasoline engine, V-arrangement
Engine capacity:	6392 cm^{3}
bore × stroke:	105.79 × 90.77 mm
gross power according to SAE J245/J1995:	340 bhp (250 kW) at 5100 min^{−1}
Max. Torque according to SAE J245/J1995:	430 lb_{f}-ft (583 N-m) at 3600 min^{−1}
Rated power according to DIN 70020:	295 hp (220 kW)
compression ratio:	10.0 : 1
mixture preparation:	1 quad carburettor
Valve timing:	Central camshaft; tappets, pushrods and rocker arms
Cooling:	Water cooling
transmission:	manual five-speed transmission (ZF) manual four-speed transmission (Oto Melara)
Front suspension:	individually on double wishbones of unequal length, coil springs, telescopic shock absorbers, anti-roll bar
Rear suspension:	individually on double wishbones, single wishbone above, trapezoidal wishbone below, two coil springs and telescopic shock absorbers per wheel
brakes:	internally ventilated disc brakes front and rear
Chassis:	Semi-monocoque
Bodywork:	Sheet steel, self-supporting
Wheelbase:	2675 mm (105.3 in)
Dimensions (length × width × height):	4460 × 1902 × 1105 mm (175.6 × 75.6 × 43.5 in)
Unladen weight:	1402 kg (3,091 lbs)
Top speed:	approx. 270 km/h (168 mph)
