= Sören Sieg =

German composer, songwriter, composer, arranger, satirist, columnist and writer

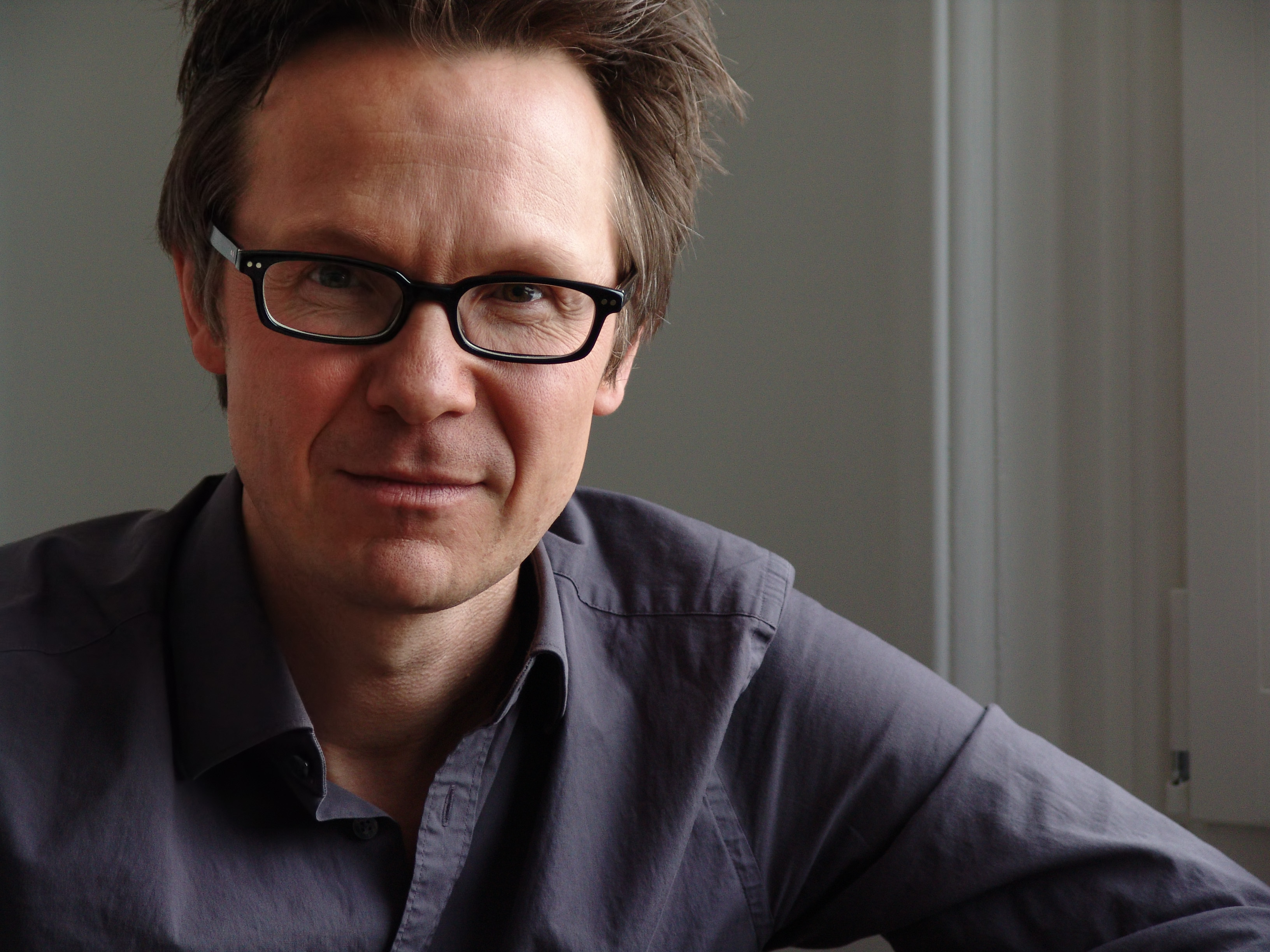
Sören Sieg (2013)

Sören Sieg (born 1 November 1966) is a German tenor, songwriter, composer, arranger, satirist, columnist and writer. He is a co-founder of the a cappella group LaLeLu, in which he sang as a tenor and hosted the performances from 1994 to 2012. From 2009 to 2013, he regularly wrote a front page column for the Bremer Newspaper. In the meantime, he works mainly as a freelance writer and composer.

== Life ==
=== Childhood, school and youth years, political studies ===
Born in Elmshorn, Sieg is a son of the teacher, writer and satirist Wolfgang Sieg (1936–2015) and also comes from a family of musicians. His mother Elisabeth Sieg, who later worked as a psychological psychotherapist, taught recorder at the Staatliche Jugendmusikschule Hamburg; his grandfather Heinrich Paff conducted a chamber orchestra. He grew up together with his older siblings Katrin (now a theatre scholar at Georgetown University, Washington, D.C.) and Sönke (now musical director on a cruise ship of the Hamburg shipping company TUI Cruises) in Elmshorn. Sieg learned languages at an early age, started school at the age of five, skipped a grade as a highly gifted child and graduated from Elmshorn High School as a 17-year-old in 1984 in the Elsa Brändström school where he passed his Abitur.

He came to music at an early age, learned to play sheet music at pre-school age and later several musical instruments, such as the recorder, violin, guitar, saxophone, trumpet and drums. Sieg also began writing at an early age, wrote his "first novel" about a family's trip to the moon at the age of six, and later wrote for the Rote Elsa, the student newspaper of the Elsa Brändström School after his Abitur- from 1984 to 1986 for the Die tageszeitung. In 1983 he won second prize in the Hamburg Steinway Music Competition. In 1985, Sieg met the Dutch composer and pianist Ronald Poelman at the Werkstatt für Jazz, Rock und Neue Musik (Workshop for Jazz, Rock and New Music) in Hamburg, who encouraged him to compose and with whom he played as a duo (Poelman: piano, Sieg: saxophone) and gave concerts for two years. Sieg wrote numerous pieces for this instrumentation. In 1986, together with some like-minded people, he founded the Desertöre, who together performed the Conscription Totalverweigerung, thus also the Wehrersatzdienst. From 1986 to 1991, he first studied politics, sociology, history and philosophy at the University of Hamburg and at Bielefeld University. He financed his studies as a piano accompanist and toured throughout Germany with Monty Arnold, Annette Mayer, Lilli Walzer, Joe Luga and many others.

=== Music studies, co-founder and head of the a cappella group LaLeLu ===
Sieg then switched to studying music and studied piano, composition and percussion at the Hochschule für Musik und Theater Hamburg from 1991 to 1996. There, he met fellow students Jan Melzer, Tobias Hanf and Stefanie Hoffmann, with whom he founded the a cappella quartet "LaLeLu" in 1994. The four-member a cappella comedy group, in which Sieg was a tenor singer as well as the "head of the group" at their performances, soon became known nationwide and had numerous performances in Germany, Austria and Switzerland. LaLeLu gave around 130 concerts a year, won numerous prizes, had several TV and radio appearances and published several CDs.

Most of the compositions, lyrics and arrangements are by Sieg; he has written a total of 11 programmes with over 200 pieces for LaLeLu. In the meantime, 5 Songbooks with mostly works by Sieg have been published to accompany the LaLeLu programmes and pieces. In June 2012, he retired from the a cappella group after a total of about 2000 concerts; however, he continues to write and arrange for LaLeLu.

=== Composer, satirist, columnist, author ===
In addition to his work for LaLeLu, Sieg composed numerous musical and choral pieces in which he combined among others African music with European recorders. His African suites have been published since 1996 by Peter Tonger and Moeck. In addition, he wrote several commissioned compositions, such as for the Amsterdam Loeki Stardust Quartet, the recorder festival Utrecht and the Ensemble Pipelife.

Sieg also worked as a satirist, columnist and author. In his first, as yet unpublished novel Das Milchstraßenpalais, which he wrote while studying at the Hamburg Musikhochschule, he processed impressions from his music studies. Excerpts from his second and third unpublished novels appeared in the Hamburger Jahrbuch für Literatur (Hamburger Ziegel and later Ziegel) in the 2000/2001 and 2008/2009 editions. From 2009 to 2013, Sieg regularly wrote a front page column for the Sunday edition of the Bremen Weser-Kurier, the Kurier am Sonntag, in which he reported on his "chaotic everyday family life" under the collective title Schönen Sonntag. The approximately 200 stories were well received by readers, and a collection of selected columns was published in book form in 2010 and 2012 respectively. He also published a partial autobiographical novel with similar subject matter, as well as, together with various co-authors, two books, each with satirical-literary Stoff, which came out in 2011 and 2013. Some of Sieg's books have also been published as e-books and audiobooks; he has also been invited to numerous author readings in the meantime.

In addition, Sieg wrote various satirical texts, among others for the Berlin cabaret Die Distel, as well as occasional contributions for the taz, which, for example, included an interview he conducted with the British author Tom Hodgkinson (among others Anleitung zum Müßiggang, Rogner und Bernhard Verlag, Berlin 2005) in a special edition of the taz in April 2012 and published excerpts in the regular print edition.

Since leaving LaLeLu, Sieg has been increasingly active as a freelance writer and composer.

== Reception ==
Sieg's comedy talent as a tenor singer and presenter as well as lyricist, composer and arranger of the a cappella quartet LaLeLu characterised the Badische Zeitung as follows:

Sören Sieg is a mixture of Wigald Boning, Charlie Brown and Herbert Feuerstein.

— Badische Zeitung, (quoted from a programme announcement of the Kleinkunstbühne Haus 13, Elmshorn)

The 2012 book Come In and Burn Out, written by Sieg together with LaLeLu co-founder Jan Melzer, was reviewed in detail by Michael Lehmann-Pape in his online portal Buch und Hörbuch Rezensionen - Rezensionsdienst (www.rezensions-seite.de). Lehmann-Pape assessed the Denglisch für Anfänger book as an amusing, humorous and not entirely serious journey through current language developments or linguistic aberrations and as thoroughly entertaining reading pleasure Sieg's book Superdaddy, also published in 2012, was reviewed among others by the Sankt Michaelsbund; Its reviewer Helmer Passon pointed out that the "secret of Sören Sieg's writing" was not "caricature-like exaggeration" but, on the contrary, the "precise observation and elaboration of the comical aspects of everyday life and the unerring punchline", and recommended the book as an "exciting entertainment novel with depth", which maintains its "comedic, but equally substantive level" throughout.

The non-fiction book '"Ich bin eine Dame, Sie Arschloch!", which Sören Sieg co-authored with Axel Krohn and which was published by Ullstein Verlag in early 2013, spent a total of 12 weeks on the paperback-bestseller list of the Spiegel Online.

== Awards and recognition ==
- 1983: 2nd prize at the "Steinway competition" in Hamburg
- 1996: "Vokalarrangementpreis" of the Hamburger Kulturbehörde
- 1999: "Gabriel Laub Satirist Prize" of the Hamburger Autorenvereinigung
- 2000: Audience Award of the Literature Yearbook of the Hamburger Ziegel
- 2002: Thüringer Kleinkunstpreis (with LaLeLu)
- 2007: Deutscher Limerickpreis (since 2009 Literaturpreis Nordost)

== Works ==
=== Books ===
- Schönen Sonntag. Vol.1: Die 88; besten Geschichten von Leo, Lina und Lukas. Bremer Tageszeitungen AG, Bremen 2010, ISBN 978-3-938795-19-4.
- Schönen Sonntag. Vol. 2: Das Neueste von Leo, Lina und Lukas. Bremer Tageszeitungen AG, Bremen 2012, ISBN 978-3-938795-42-2.
- with Jan Melzer: Come In and Burn Out. Denglisch, der Survival-Guide (dtv. Nr. 24872 – Premium). Deutscher Taschenbuch Verlag (dtv), Munich 2011, ISBN 978-3-423-24872-3. (Illustrations: Helge Jepsen) (Review).
- Superdaddy. Roman. List, Berlin 2012, ISBN 978-3-471-35076-8. (Review).
- with Axel Krohn: "Ich bin eine Dame, Sie Arschloch!" Deutsche Dialogue mitgehört. Ullstein, Berlin 2013, ISBN 978-3-548-37456-7. (Spiegel Online-Bestseller)
- Geringfügig renovierungsbedürftig. Vom Wahnsinn beim Wohnungskauf. DuMont, Cologne 2013, ISBN 978-3-8321-6249-8.
- with Axel Krohn: "Ich hab dich rein optisch nicht verstanden." Deutsche Dialogue mitgehört. Ullstein, Berlin 2014, ISBN 978-3-548-37539-7.
- "Auch hier?" Völlig unnütze Fragen, die Sie niemals stellen sollten, samt Antworten, die Sie niemals hören werden. Herder, Freiburg im Breisgau 2014, ISBN 978-3-451-06680-1.

=== Book contributions ===
- Excerpt from the unpublished novel Aufzeichnungen aus dem Untergrund. In the Hamburger Ziegel No.7. Yearbook for Literature (2000/2001). Published on behalf of the Hamburg Department of Culture. Dölling und Galitz, Hamburg 2000, ISBN 3-933374-65-0 (with CD-ROM)
- Excerpt from the unpublished novel Böse Geister. In Ziegel. No.11. Hamburg Yearbook for Literature, 2008/2009. Published on behalf of the Hamburg Cultural Authority. Dölling und Galitz, Hamburg 2008, ISBN 978-3-937904-73-3.

=== Compositions ===
- African Suite No.1, consisting of:
  - Djaboué. An African Suite. for three (alternating) recorders. Tonger, Cologne 1998, (score, parts).
  - Djaboué. Afrikanische Suite No. 1. In Sören Sieg: Pina ya phala. Afrikanische Suite No.2. Kissing und Wildner, Hamburg/Musikwelt, Münster (Westfalen), both 2001 (interpreter: Flûtes en Bloc, recording from 1999; 1 CD with booklet).
- Pina ya phala. Afrikanische Suite No.2. Kissing und Wildner, Hamburg/Musikwelt, Münster (Westphalia), both 2001 (interpreter: Flûtes en Bloc, recording 1999; 1 CD with booklet).
- Mavumo ya uana. African Suite No. 3. for recorder quartet. Moeck, Celle 2005, (music print; score and parts).
- Umlanjana. 20 African duets in ascending difficulty for recorder duo. 2014.
- Ajo Oloyin. African Suite No.6. for eight recorders (SSAATTBB). 2014.
- 16 Variations on an Irish Jig, For Recorder Quintet (ATTBG). 2014 (premiered in January 2014 by the ensemble Pipelife in Karlsruhe).

=== Column ===
- Front page column, which was regularly published on Sundays from April 2009 to June 2013 under the collective title Schönen Sonntag in the Kurier am Sonntag, the Sunday edition of the Bremer Weser-Kurier. A total of 202 columns appeared.
- Selection of individual column contributions as examples:
  - Die Kunst des Einwortsatzes. Warum mein Sohn unbedingt Regierungssprecher werden sollte – Schönen Sonntag! Kurier am Sonntag, Bremen, 16 May 2010, p. 1
  - Parmesan 21. Eine Bewegung rollt durch Deutschland – und ist nicht aufzuhalten: Schönen Sonntag! Kurier am Sonntag, Bremen, 21 November 2010, p. 1 (online; PDF, 382 kB).
