= Alfred Teves =

Entrepreneur for vehicles and vehicle parts

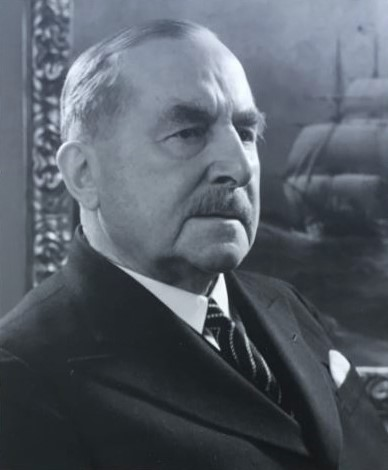
- Alfred Teves 1950, Historisches Museum Frankfurt / Nachlass Max Göllner
- Born: 27 January 1868; Trittau, Schleswig-Holstein, Kingdom of Prussia
- Died: November 5, 1953 (aged 85); Glashütten (Taunus)-Oberems, Hesse, German Federal Republic (West Germany)
- Occupations: Ship's captain Auto-industry pioneer Entrepreneur-industrialist
- Spouses: Else Bruch, 1880–1915 (m. 1905) Maria Göttsching, 1881–1952 (m. 1927)
- Children: Heinz Wilhelm Teves (1906-1978); Alfred Erich Teves (1910-1912); Ernst August Teves (1913-1981)

Alfred Teves (27 January 1868 – 5 November 1953) was a German ship's captain who after a short naval career from 1898 reinvented himself as an auto industry entrepreneur. The "Alfred Teves Maschinen- und Armaturenfabrik" company became one of the largest suppliers of components and sub-assemblies to the German auto-industry. It was rebranded during the early 1920s, more succinctly, as "ATE".

== Life ==
=== Provenance and early years ===
Alfred Teves was born in Trittau, a small town in Schleswig-Holstein, located some 30 km (20 miles) east of Hamburg. Friedrich Wilhelm Teves (1814–1871), his father, who died while he was still a small child, was a local government official. His mother, born Auguste Biernatzki (1833–1923), was the daughter of Johann Christoph Biernatzki, a Protestant pastor (and published author).

Between 1877 and 1883 Alfred Teves attended for the prestigious "Katharineum" (secondary school) and the "Großheim’schen Realschule" (secondary school) in the nearby city of Lübeck and then switched to a specialist sea-faring school in Steinwerder, emerging qualified for work as a helmsman. He went to sea in 1885, employed at different stages as a second officer and, after acquiring the necessary additional qualifications at the Royal Navigation College in Altona, as a ship's captain, both on sailing ships and steam ships.

=== Adler ===
Teves told an interviewer later that he moved onshore because he felt that as a ship's captain he had progressed his career as far as he could at sea: his appetite for adventure had been sated. He joined the Frankfurt-based company Adlerwerke vorm. Heinrich Kleyer AG" (better known by the name it acquired in 1900 as "Adlerwerke" or more simply still, "Adler"), principally known when Teves joined as a manufacturer of bicycles and tricycles. Heinrich Kleyer (1853–1952), the firm's founder and a brilliant engineer, was a cousin of Alfred Teves. Teves joined the company as a warehouse clerk. In 1899 Adler diversified into the manufacturing of motor cars, and by 1902 Teves had risen to the position of "Head of car sales". Like many auto-industry executives at the dawn of the motoring age, Teves participated in a number of automobile races during the early part of the twentieth century.

=== Car parts entrepreneur ===
In October 1906 Alfred Teves set up his own business, still in Frankfurt. "Alfred Teves, Automobil-Technisches Material und Zubehörteile" was a distributor for automobile equipment and accessories. Not for the last time, Teves' timing was impeccable. Automobile manufacturing was undergoing a phase of rapid expansion, and Frankfurt was a major centre of industrial and commercial opportunity. The business flourished. It continued to prosper under the same name till 1925, although it was far from the only business with which Teves would involve himself through that eventful period.

In December 1909 Teves teamed up with his friend the engineer Matthäus Braun, who moved across from the Stuttgart-based "Süddeutsche Kühlerfabrik Julius Fr. Behr" to establish the "Mitteldeutsche Kühlerfabrik" ("Central Germany Radiator Factory") in Stuttgart. The factory started off with a workforce of 120, and was soon manufacturing radiators not just for automobiles but also for aeroplanes. In 1911, by this time employing 300 people, the manufactory was transferred to Frankfurt. Customers included August Horch's Audi and Wanderer businesses, along with Hansa in the north of Germany. By this time the focus of the Teves businesses was on manufacturing rather than on wholesaling or retailing the product of other suppliers. It was also in 1911 that Teves purchased a workshop for the manufacture of manual compression adjustment valves. This factory was relaunched in 1912 and rebranded as the "Alfred Teves Maschinen- und Armaturenfabrik". During the war that broke out two years later this factory, under the capable direction of Chief Engineer Nathan Sally Stern (1879– 1975) whom Teves knew from Adlerwerke AG, would be modified to produce fuses and cartridges for munitions, along with various associated precision components. The war years were a period of rapid expansion for the factory, which became by 1918 one of the principal manufacturing businesses in Frankfurt, with approximately 2,000 people on the payroll.

=== Manufacturing during the boom years ===
After the war, with the scale of his enterprise transformed by success as a manufacturer of munitions components, and with new efficiencies in production technology having become mainstream across the auto-industry in western Europe through the pressures of war, Alfred Teves made the switch to peace-time production. In 1919 the business was converted into a limited liability company (GmbH). A stroke of good fortune turned up in the form of a longstanding German friend from Brussels, who had been forced to leave Belgium in the punishing aftermath of the disastrous war. The friend arrived with an offer to sell to Teves the plant and equipment from the piston ring factory he had previously set up in Belgium, and which was now crated up and temporarily stored in fourteen railway wagons. The offer also included the necessary patents to embark on the manufacture of piston rings. The dispossessed entrepreneur was relocating to Switzerland: he had no plans to return to the manufacture of piston rings himself, and was keen to find a buyer. The deal that followed evidently suited both the parties. Alfred Teves quickly emerged as a major supplier of piston rings at the start of what turned out to be a decade of significant expansion for the German auto industry. The Teves production portfolio already also included components for car braking systems. It was in 1921 that a new more modern logo, featuring the letters ATE, replaced the former more fussy badge that had depicted a fist holding up a hammer encircled by a piston ring. By the mid-1920s the company had become Germany's largest producer of piston rings, producing these not just for passenger cars, but also for commercial vehicles and, according to one source, for aircraft engines.

During the mid-1920s Alfred Teves acquired from Lockheed Corporation in North America a license to produce hydraulic braking systems for cars. The Adler Standard 6, introduced to the market in October 1926 at the Berlin Motor Show, was the first volume-produced car outside North America to feature hydraulic brakes. The subassemblies were supplied by ATE. Hydraulic brakes became mainstream on German and French mid-sized and luxury cars during the decade that followed, and the profitability they conferred on their manufacturers contributed to a further significant growth for the Teves car-parts conglomerate. The number of German cars sold with "Ate-Lockheed" hydraulic brakes had surged to 47% by 1932, and to 73% by 1938. In addition to automobile braking systems, "ATE" were also at the forefront in developing and supplying hydraulic components for cars, aircraft, shipping related applications and motorbikes, both within Germany and for export markets.

=== Diversification ===
During 1928 Teves used some of the profits gained from supplying a booming auto-industry to embark on a major diversification. The "Ate-Haushaltskühlschrank" project drew inspiration from the technology developed over the previous ten years by Frigidaire, a General Motors subsidiary based, by this stage, in Dayton, Ohio. A single cylinder reciprocating compressor was driven by an electric motor, using a V-belt. The assembly's crankshaft was sealed against the belt casing by means of a stuffing box. Air cooling of the condenser made the use of a hydraulic connection unnecessary. The Refrigerant used was Methyl chloride CH_{3}Cl. A special feature was a selector switch linked to a thermostat which automatically maintained the selected temperature. Teves claimed to be the first to manufacture an automatic refrigerator in Europe. The market had hitherto been dominated by American imports. During 1929 "Ate-Haushaltskühlschrank" developed an entire range of refrigerators, starting with domestic consumers – a market in which price competition quickly became intense – and moving on a range of more specialist commercial applications in the retail, agriculture and dairy sectors. On the high streets high-class Konditorei selling cream cakes, butchers shops with sausage manufacturing facilities at the back, health food shops, restaurants, hotels, other industrial caterers and even ice cream parlours all offered tempting commercial opportunities.

=== An end to the good times ===
In 1928, for the first time, the German auto industry produced more than 100,000 passenger cars. It would be another six years before that level of output would be exceeded. The Wall Street crash of 1929 was followed by a return to acute economic austerity and a collapse in consumer demand during the Great Depression, as unemployment peaked in 1932 at well above five million. The auto-industry was particularly badly hit. Brennabor, which is believed to have been Germany's largest auto-producer in the middle 1920s, saw its business collapse at the end of the decade and would never return to volume production. The Teves industrial empire emerged from the economic carnage relatively unscathed, and Alfred Teves himself by this time enjoyed a reputation for a singular combination of entrepreneurial flair and prescience which he would retain through the difficult years that followed.

Meanwhile, German politics became increasingly polarised, and by the early 1930s the polarisation was spilling onto the streets, while the growing strength of the two principal extremist parties in parliament led to that institution becoming deadlocked as the Communists and the National Socialists refused to enter into coalition either with each other or with any of the more moderate parties. In January 1933 the Hitler government took power and lost little time in transforming Germany into a one-party dictatorship. Teves had never shown any appetite for political involvement; but like all Germany's industrial leaders he would come under growing pressure to throw in his lot with the government during the twelve Hitler years. During 1933 it became clear very quickly that the shrill antisemitism that had featured prominently in the utterances of populist street politicians from before the start of the 1930s had become a core underpinning of government strategy. Many Germans – including Jewish Germans – during the early years of National Socialism, were unable to believe the extent to which Jews would be persecuted and killed under the Hitler government. These included the brilliant engineer Nathan Sally Stern (1879 – 1975) who had been at the side of Alfred Teves for twenty years. Stern was forced to leave the company in July 1936, but continued to receive consultancy fees and agency commissions from Teves while he arranged his emigration to England. According to at least one source there were many other Jews whom Teves helped to conceal or, using his international contacts, to escape to Hungary or to the Netherlands or to Belgium as the situation in Germany deteriorated. Surviving details of what this involved are nevertheless sparse.

=== Industrial revival ===
During the 1930s governments in western Europe sought to expand car ownership and usage, in part as a route back to economic growth. The so-called "Motorisierung" strategy was implemented with particular fervour in Germany, supported by an economic strategy of deficit financing which then, as now, was contentious among economic theorists. The German government indeed went a step further than the governments in England or France: new cars purchased in Germany after April 1933 were no longer burdened by an annual car tax charge. Despite the success of his diversification into refrigeration technology, car parts remained at the heart of the Teves business empire, which shared in the auto-sector recovery. In 1934 a substantial new manufacturing facility was set up in Berlin under the leadership of Alfred Teves' eldest son, Heinz Wilhelm Teves (1906–1978). In 1939 a large plant to produce refrigeration products was erected at Frankfurt-Fechenheim.

Starting in 1936, Teves developed special braking systems tailored to motorsport, which were used in the Mercedes-Benz and Auto Union racing cars of the period. In or before 1939 Teves accepted the designation of "Wehrwirtschaftsführer", a title conferred by government on senior businessmen responsible for factories which might be converted for production of armaments and munitions in the event of war preparations becoming necessary. According to at least one commentator the "appointment" involved no obligation, but created an outward semblance of harmony with party bosses. Others have taken a less charitable view.

=== Another war ===
It was also during 1939, in another part of the Frankfurt conglomeration, that a specialist foundry was opened. The specialist foundry at Frankfurt-Bonames applied a centrifugal casting process to produce cylinder jackets and ribbed cylinders suitable for use in air-cooled motors and compressors, turbine and bearing housings for turbochargers, and other more rarefied applications. It was also during 1939, in September, under the terms of a recently concluded secret agreement between Berlin and Moscow, that Poland was invaded by the German army from the west and, slightly more than two weeks later, by the Soviet army from the south and east. Another world war had been launched in Europe.

Over the next couple of years the German auto-industry was transformed for war production. Although the exercise lacked the pre-planned slick efficiency of the equivalent process in England, by 1942 virtually no passenger cars were being produced in Germany. The Teves factories that had produced car components were switched to war production, which seems to have involved aircraft engine components, although there is a surprising shortage of detail available as to precisely what was produced. The plants producing refrigeration equipment were now producing air conditioning systems for research facilities and testing rooms and for bomb shelters. As the war progressed there was an increasing call for more elaborate air conditioning systems to process the air in underground communications centres and command centres. There were also freezer compartments to be installed in submarines.

Alfred Teves managed to maintain a more distanced relationship in respect of the Hitler government than many of his fellow-industry bosses. He may have had family connections to the United States. For historical reasons, the proportion of Frankfurt citizens likely to be identified by the authorities as Jewish was greater than in most other German cities. Teves did what he could, without fanfare, to provide support for his Jewish workers, and was also quietly sympathetic to those at risk of politically driven persecution. When workers in the Frankfurt region lost their job because of their links to the (since 1933 outlawed) Social Democratic Party, they were often able to find work in one of the Teves factories, where management would avoid noticing the formation of anti-government resistance cells. Inevitably the security services became aware of what was being done, but the extent of their knowledge is unclear. It may have been a reflection of the importance of his Frankfurt factories to the war effort that for some time Teves seems never to have been troubled by any unwelcome attentions the authorities beyond intensified surveillance. Inside the company's principal Frankfurt plant there was an unwritten rule that workers should not greet one another with the Hitler greeting, use of which had become routine outside the factory gates. It seems to have been accepted that the greeting should be avoided because it would have made many employees in the factory uncomfortable. Even employees who were party members generally respected the need to avoid using the greeting in the factory, albeit not without complaint. During 1942 the government's racist strategy became more systematic. The scale and brutality of the antisemitism greatly intensified. A recent study by Paul Erker of the Ludwig-Maximilians-Universität München reports a hitherto little known episode: Alfred Teves was warned that he must fire his Jewish employees or he would not be permitted to display the banners of the government mandated German Labour Front in his factory. Teves is reported to have exploded: "You can hang your rags wherever you want. I will not do it." In 1940 Alfred Teves was forced by the government to surrender control of his business to his younger son, Ernst. In 1942 the business lost its legal status as a limited liability company (GmbH), becoming instead a "Limited Partnership" ("Kommanditgesellschaft"/ KG). The four partners were Alfred Teves, his second wife Maria (with a sixth share each) and his two surviving sons (a third each).

As a high-profile "Wehrwirtschaftsführer", Alfred Teves came under pressure to join the party, and his membership application was submitted in 1939. In 1941, slightly unusually, he was still listed as a "Parteianwärter" (loosely, candidate for party membership). There is no indication that his membership application was ever progressed further, and following publication in 2020 of the results of detailed archival study undertaken by Paul Erker, it has become possible to assert that neither Teves nor his sons ever joined Hitler's National Socialist Party. Prof. Erker's work was undertaken in the context of a broader study into the records during the Hitler years of all the industrial firms which – long after the death of Alfred Teves – have become part of the Continental AG car parts conglomerate. In striking contrast to other businesses which have been subsumed into Continental, it can also now be stated that the Teves businesses never employed concentration camp prisoners, even after legal control was forcibly transferred from father to son in 1940.

Equally, however, it is impossible to overlook the way in which the Teves businesses contributed to the war economy, benefitting from contracts with the land army, the air force and the navy for fighting equipment. German fighter and bomber aircraft were all fitted with hydraulic systems developed and manufactured by Teves. Equipment supplied also included items at the cutting edge of technology, such as automated steering systems for tanks.

=== After the war ===
In May 1945 war ended in military defeat. The eastern third of Germany was subsumed into a reconfigured version of Poland, while the western two thirds were divided into zones of military occupation, administered respectively by the Americans, the Soviets, the British and the French. The Teves plants in the Frankfurt conurbation were subject to administration by the U.S. army while the Berlin plant was under Soviet military administration. A small subsidiary plant which had been set up at Brombach (Lörrach) near Basel during the closing months of the war in order to avoid the savage aerial bombing of Frankfurt during 1944/45 was now in the French zone, which was hermetically sealed off from the adjoining American zone.

Directly after the war the assets of Alfred Teves KG were sequestered by the military administrators representing the occupying powers. It was only after the so-called "Spruchkammer" had determined that Alfred Teves had been merely a "Mitläufer" ("fellow-traveller" of the Hitler regime) – in other words, not a committed Nazi – that in 1947 Teves was able formally to resume his position at the head of the company's board.

During the final months of the war Frankfurt and Berlin had been heavily bombed. Despite the sequestration of the company, Teves was able to access his factories in Frankfurt, which was in the American zone. In May 1945 he turned up at what had been the main "Alfred Teves Maschinen- und Armaturenfabrik" (factory) in Frankfurt with a team of 14 men, and began work on clearing away the rubble. According to estimates the factory had been "approximately 85% destroyed". The Frankfurt-Fechenheim refrigeration plant had also suffered severe degradation. In the city's northern suburbs the casting foundry in Frankfurt-Bonames seemed to have been spared from serious damage. Initially there was no news from embattled Berlin of the "Teveswerke Motorenteile und Hydraulische Aggregate GmbH" subsidiary plant in Berlin-Wittenau. However, by the end of May 1945 refugees were streaming west, and news very soon leaked out that the entire factory had been stripped of plant and fittings, down to the last electric wall socket, presumably by the Soviets, although Berlin-Wittenau was later transferred to French military administration, in accordance with pre-existing agreements between the allied armies confirmed at Potsdam in July 1945. According to reports reaching the west, by that time only the empty shells of the company's buildings remained in place, albeit badly degraded. During the war some of the production of the Berlin-Wittenau plant had been transferred to a new production facility at Blumberg, close to the Swiss frontier and Schaffhausen. This had survived the war without damaged, but like the plant at Brombach (Lörrach) near Basel it had ended up in the French zone which was sealed off from the American zone and the rest of Germany. Alfred Teves was "only" 77 when the war ended, and determined that the company should return to health, telling relatives and friends "Wir kommen wieder hoch!" (loosely, "we're coming right back up!"). The only realistic prospect of succeeding in this lay in rebuilding the business in place of the rubble that had been the main "Alfred Teves Maschinen- und Armaturenfabrik" in Frankfurt. Alfred Teves set to work with his sons Heinz and Ernst, along with their new commercial director and business partner, Martin Tausend, to rebuild the business in the Frankfurt site. There was a formidable array of permits from the military administrators and licenses to be negotiated, but Teves succeeded in pushing through the many bureaucratic hurdles and commercial challenges involved. As survivors returned he was able slowly to rebuild his workforce, and a number of temporary workshops were constructed inside the perimeter of the former factory building. After a year there was a workforce of approximately 200 engaged in the production of components for vehicle braking systems. Every returning former employee released from a prison camp or demobilisation was re-engaged. There was no shortage of work. Apart from the initially small-scale production of brake parts there was still a massive job of rebuilding to be undertaken.

Progressing the rehabilitation of the Frankfurt-Fechenheim factory was more of a challenge, partly on account of a serious shortage of several of the key materials necessary for refrigeration equipment, but also because in the immediate aftermath of the most destructive war to date, the principal priority was clearing the rubble and reconstructing the more basic infrastructure, such as homes, food shops and other work places. With disposable income in short supply, refrigeration equipment was well down on the list of vital purchases. The manufacturing plant surviving stocks of raw materials were therefore redeployed to manufacture stoves and cooking pots, urgently needed by displaced persons and those whose now living in homes had been destroyed by aerial bombing. To an extent, this shift in production was simply a question of making a virtue out of necessity, but the need to maintain quality was nevertheless implicitly acknowledged. More than a decade later, many of the stoves and pots manufactured by "Plant Fechenheim" were reported still to be in daily use.

By 1948 the workforce reached and then exceeded 3,500, the level at which it peaked before the outbreak of war in 1939. Much of the damage to the main production facility at Frankfurt was still not repaired, but Albert Teves years of pre-war investment and experience nevertheless meant that as early as 1948 was well placed to supply the automobile parts and sub-assemblies which would be crucial to the rapidly expanding German auto industry during the dawning "Wirtschaftswunder" decade, with a particular focus on braking systems. Using the Lockheed first acquired in the 1920s, these became a core element in the company's product portfolio. By 1960 most German-built passenger cars were fitted with ATE Lockheed brakes.

Meanwhile, scope for integrating the little plant at Brombach (Lörrach) in the French occupation zone continued to be affected by bureaucratic hurdles, and in 1951 the Brombach facility was abandoned. By this time a new plant for braking components and subassemblies had quietly been constructed and opened at Gifhorn in the British zone. In May 1949 the British, French and American zones – had been merged to form a new U.S. sponsored West German state which came with the promise of enhanced economic integration between the hitherto separately administered sectors. (The Soviet zone was excluded for political reasons, with the result that Germany would remain politically and economically divided till 1990. The Soviet occupation zone nevertheless underwent its own relaunch as a semi-autonomous nation state in October 1949, becoming the Soviet sponsored "German Democratic Republic" / East Germany") The significance of the Gifhorn location was greatly enhanced by its proximity to Wolfsburg, home to the Volkswagen Gifhorn and Wolfsburg were also both located close to the so-called "Inner German border", which during the early 1950s remained, for most purposes, porous. Half of the workers recruited to work at the Gifhorn factory during those years were economic and/or political refugees from East Germany.

It is not entirely clear at what stage Alfred Teves stepped back from the business empire that he had built up and then, after 1945, built up all over again. During his final years he retired to Glashütten-Oberems, a small village in the Taunus hill country north of Frankfurt. Responsibility over the management of the business passed increasingly to his sons Heinz and Ernst. It was at Oberems, a few weeks short of what would have been his eighty-fifth birthday, that Alfred Teves died on 5 November 1953. His body was nevertheless transported to a Lutheran Cemetery in Frankfurt for burial.

Car parts production continued to expand and diversify through the "Wirtschaftswunder" years. In addition, during 1953/54 the Fechenheim plant, now known as "Ate-Haushaltskühlschrank", began production of domestic refrigerators. Whether by luck or judgement the firm's timing was, not for the first time, perfect, as over the next few years domestic refrigerators became "normal" features of domestic kitchens across virtually the entire spread of household incomes. During the 1960s the pace of economic recovery slowed, however, and in 1967, during a period of consolidation the business was acquired by the "International Standard Electric Corporation", a subsidiary of the U.S. based International Telephone & Telegraph Corporation. Slightly more than three decades later, in 1998, it was sold on to Continental AG of Hanover and rebranded as "Continental Teves AG & Co. oHG".
