= Flunkyball =

German drinking game

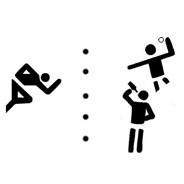
Flunkyball logo

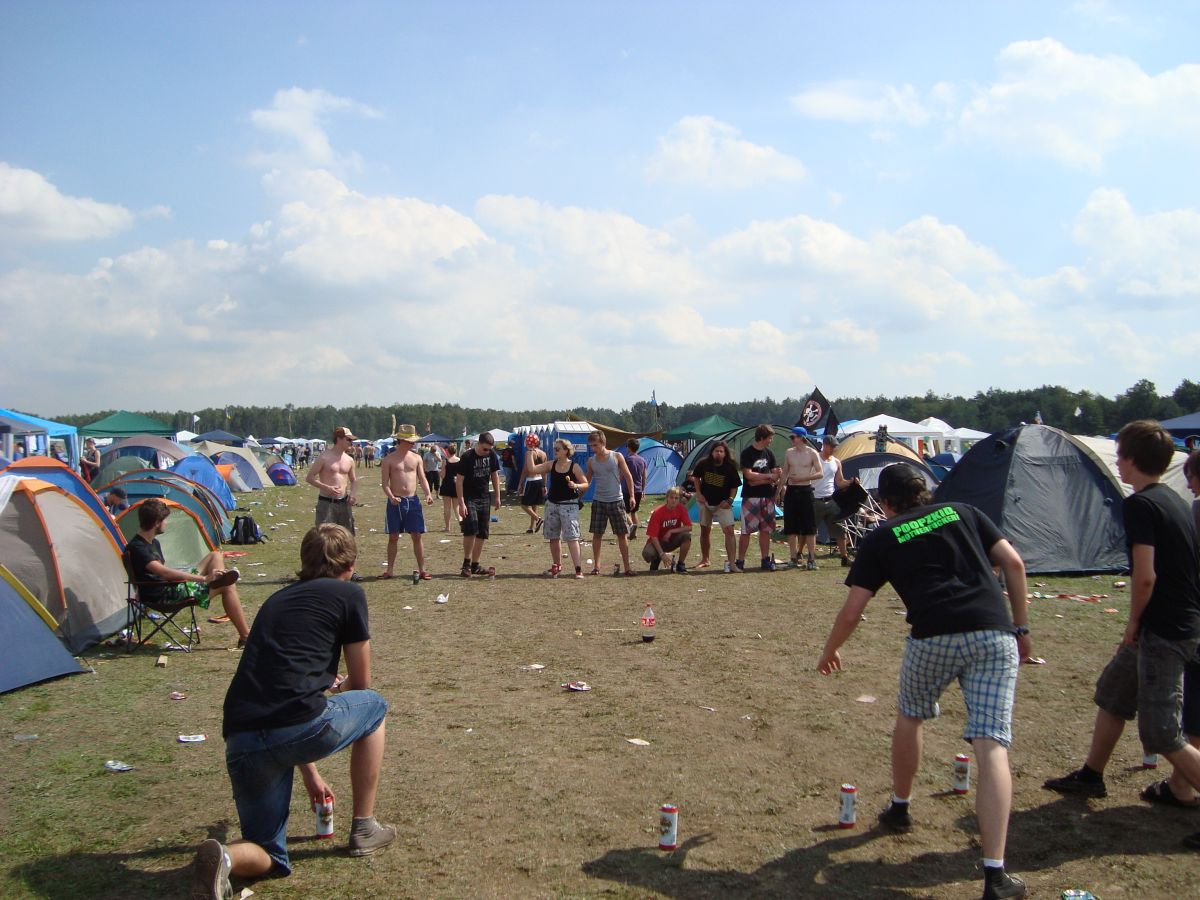
A game of Flunkyball at the Area4-Festival

Flunkyball, also called Bierball, is a German drinking game in which two teams compete to finish an alcoholic beverage (usually beer). The game originates from Denmark (Kævle) and spread to Germany after their defeat to Denmark in the Euro 1992 final, which is why the Germans call it Flunkyball.

== Rules of the Game ==
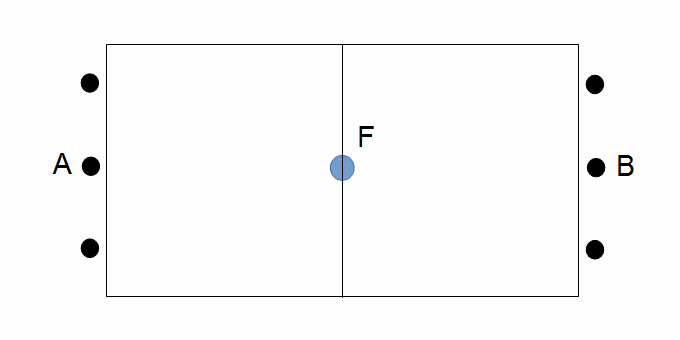
Sketch of a Flunkyball field: Teams A and B positioned behind the baselines, target object F in the middle.

Two teams stand in a row facing each other at a distance of about 10 meters. The number of players on a team is not set uniformly; team sizes between 3 and 8 people are common. Each player has a beer bottle or can on the ground in front of them. Between the two teams in the middle of the playing field is a target, usually a partially-filled bottle of water, which should be hit by a ball and tipped over. The team with the ball has one attempt to hit the target with the ball. If the target falls over, the team that threw the ball can drink their beer. The opposing team must set up the target again and bring the ball behind their own line. As soon as the opposing team has restored the playing field, they shout "Stop" loudly, whereupon the team that threw must stop drinking. When both teams are ready again, the other team can throw. The team that drinks all of its beers first wins the game.

== Penalties ==
Penalties can be given, for example, if a player starts drinking too early, continues drinking after the "stop" call, or vomits. Even beer spilling (for example because the bottle overflows or falls over) can be penalised. Possible penalties can be an additional "penalty beer" for a player, missing a drink, or a drink for the opposing team. What action is considered a rule violation and how it is punished varies from place to place.

== Variants ==
The rules of Flunkyball vary from place to place and are often only set at the beginning of the round, or even during the game. The distances between the throwers and the target vary. Sometimes all that must be done to finish a round is to set up the target without getting the ball behind your own line. Instead of a ball, a plastic bottle can be used as a throwing device. Instead of beer, the game can also be played with non-alcoholic drinks, such as iced tea. The amount of liquid to be drunk also varies. The scale ranges from standard 330 mL cans to 1.5 litre containers. Sometimes, like at Pinkpop 2026 a trolley is used instead of a ball.

== Spread ==
Flunkyball is usually played during the summer, in green spaces such as parks. It is also sometimes played at music festivals in Germany.

The game is particularly popular among university students, notably at the Karlsruhe Institute of Technology and in Elmshorn, where championships are held annually.

While still relatively unknown, Flunkyball is becoming gradually more popular in the United Kingdom. Also in recent years it has become a widely popular game among Polish high school and university students.

== History ==
The first Flunkyball games were played in the early 2000s and were played with beer cans in the middle that had to be knocked over. In the first versions, the game was played with a "puck" (a beer can crushed into a disc), a ball or a stick. With the introduction of the uniform deposit requirement for beer cans on 1 May 2006, the version with a "puck" became increasingly rare.

The first "World Championships" were held in Darmstadt in 2005, with a team from Dillenburg winning.

== In Pop Culture ==
A music video by the band Kraftklub from Chemnitz shows a round of Flunkyball.

Flunkyball is also the title of a 2023 feature film by Alexander Adolph. However, the drinking game only appears in one scene.
