= Erich Kästner Gemeinschaftsschule Elmshorn =

School in Elmshorn, Germany

Coordinates: 53.74241°N 9.67322°E

Erich Kästner Gemeinschaftsschule Elmshorn (KGSE), formerly known as Kooperative Gesamtschule Elmshorn, is a German Cooperative Comprehensive School in Elmshorn-Hainholz. The KGSE is a Gesamtschule (comprehensive school) situated in Elmshorn; as such, allowing pupils to study alongside each other for one of the three German major school qualifications: Hauptschulabschluss, Realschulabschluss (roughly equivalent to GCSEs in the UK) and Abitur (equivalent of A-Levels in the UK).

== Eponym ==
The school is named after Erich Kästner, a respected German children's writer, maybe best known for the book Emil and the detectives.

== Description ==
Elmshorn is a city of 52000 inhabitants in Schleswig-Holstein 30mins travelling time north of Hamburg. The school has about 1350 students, who come from the neighbourhood. It is an Ganztagsschule (de) with lessons starting at 8.00 and continuing until 3.00 pm, three days a week and 1.00pm otherwise but open into the evening. It shares a space with the district library.

== Building ==
The old building was beyond repair so the pupils were decanted into a temporary building, then moved into this new build in 2015. The design contact was placed with Böge Lindner K2 Architekten. The school is light and airy, in three storey building constructed in 2015. All rooms have natural light and opening windows give natural ventilation. The building occupies a prominent cornersite, and the building are arranged along a spine, called the school street. They feature corridors that open to multi-storey light-wells, and multi-storey halls and sports halls. The individual blocks are built round courtyards.

== Academics ==

Gesamtschule are not common in Germany. They are mainly found in Bremen and Saarland. They exist in two forms: Integriete (integrated) where the pupils are taught together throughout and Koopertive (cooperative) where the pupils are streamed and are only integrated for sport.
