= Felix Nieder =

German model, author

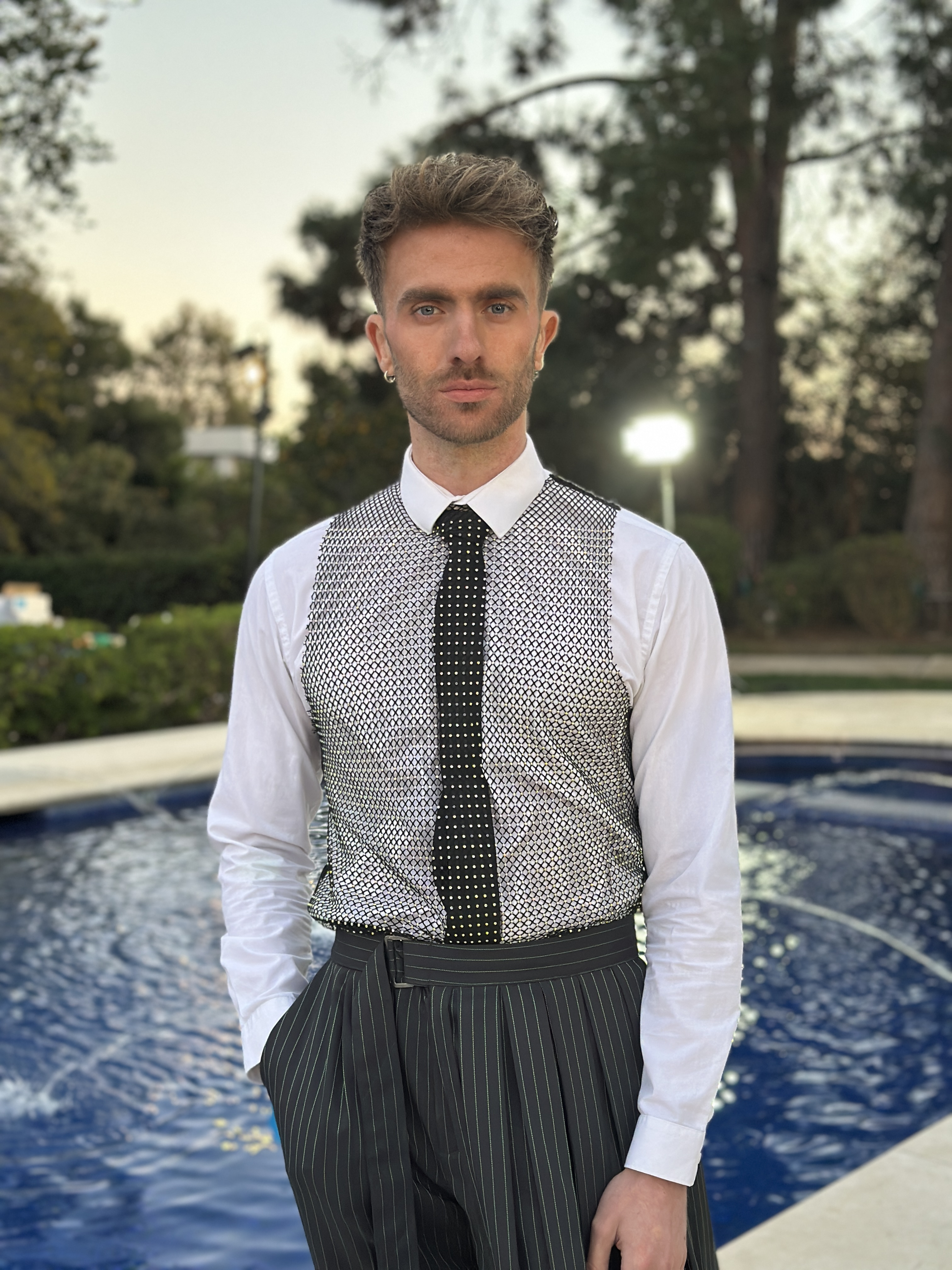
- Nieder for United Nations at the Global Impact Awards in Bel Air in 2024
- Born: 29 May 1993 (age 33); Elmshorn, Germany
- Modeling information
- Height: 1.84 m (6 ft 1/2 in)
- Hair color: Blonde
- Eye color: Blue
- Website: felixnieder.com

Felix Nieder (born May 29, 1993) is a German model, jurist and author who became known through his nomination for GQ Man of the Year 2021 and has been the most booked male model in Germany since 2022.

== Childhood and private life ==
Nieder was born in Elmshorn in 1993. He graduated from high school in the same city in 2013. In 2014, he began studying law at the University of Hamburg and graduated with a Bachelor of Laws (LL.B.) in 2025.

Nieder is gay, for which he was severely bullied as a child. In an interview with Der Spiegel, Nieder recalled "I didn't want to be gay. I disguised myself and even ripped the head off my Arielle Barbie". He led a pseudo-hetero life for years before coming out at the age of 23.

His grandmother, Waltraud Bräuß, is one of the most successful TikTok influencers in her age group in Germany.

== Career ==
=== 2016–2020 Start of model career ===
In 2016 Nieder was discovered by an American model agency. Therefore he went to Berlin, Los Angeles and Milan to gain his first experiences as a model with test-photoshoots. In 2018 he attended at the LA Fashion Week.

=== 2021–2022 Becoming the most booked male model in Germany ===
In 2021, Nieder was nominated as Man of the Year by the men's magazine GQ Germany. The nomination brought him his first major publicity. Since then, he has worked for well-known fashion brands. Nieder gained further attention when he walked the catwalk during German Fashion Week in summer 2022 wearing a bridal skirt by Dawid Tomaszewski and holding up the sign "Love is Love". As a result, several major media outlets featured him and discussed whether men could also wear women's dresses. From then on, he addressed critical issues such as pink washing and the gender fluid approach to fashion in public. Since 2022, he has been the most booked male model in Germany.

He has been dubbed the "gender fluid model", as he moves fluidly between the genders in fashion.

=== 2023–2024 Book: When my gay self died and international success ===
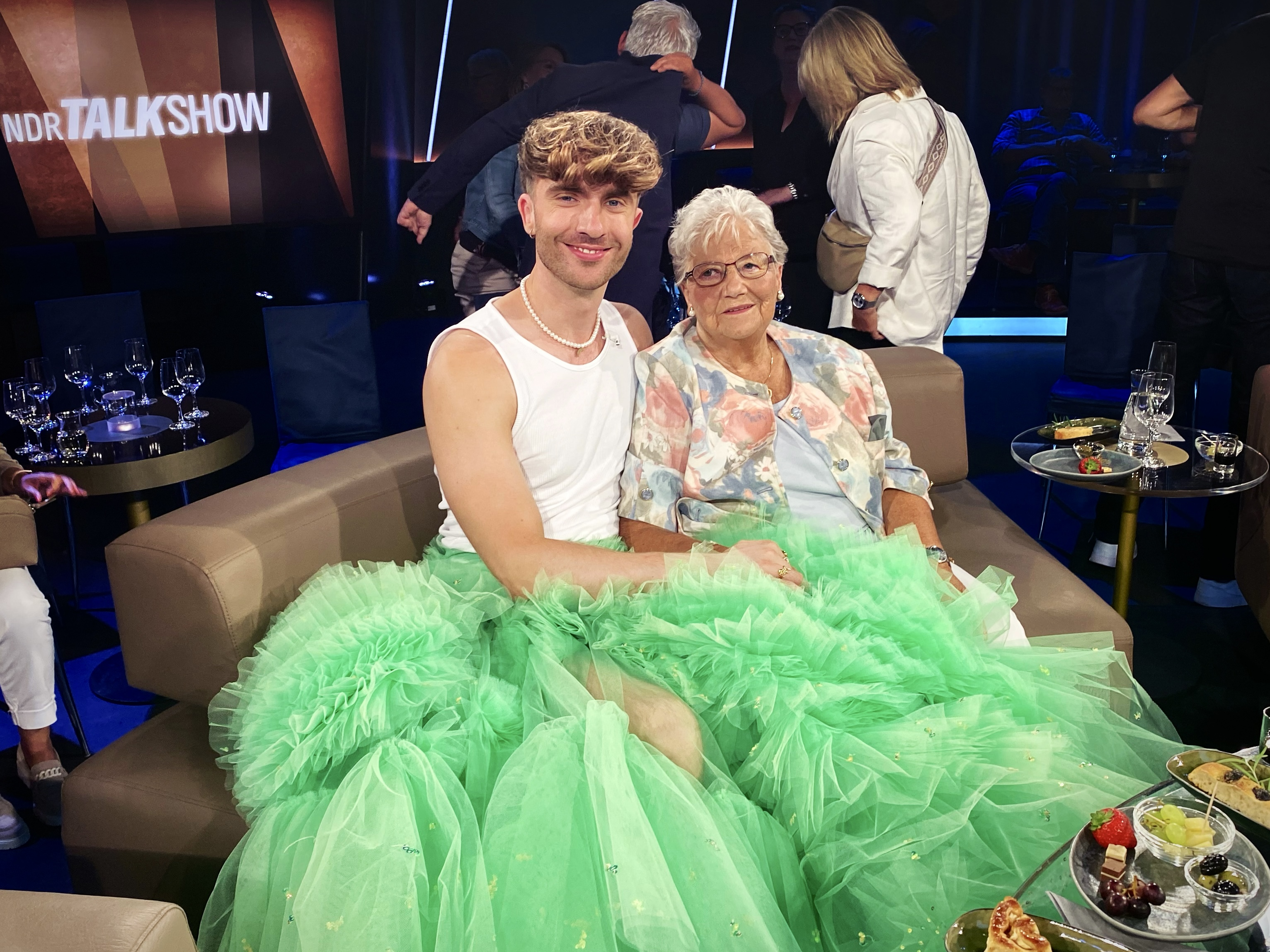
Nieder with his grandma Waltraud at a German Talkshow in August 2023

Beginning in February 2023, reports and documentaries were published by NDR and ARD about his life.

On August 2, 2023, Nieder published his autobiography When my gay self died. In it, he explores his journey as a gay man and grievances in the fashion world. The book's premiere took place on the same day in Hamburg in front of an audience and the media. In the following days he presented his book on several German talk shows.

On November 16, 2024, Nieder represented gender fluidity and queer rights at the Global Impact Awards hosted by the United Nations in Bel Air. He expressed concerns about the rise of discrimination against divers people and also transphobia in the United States. On December 20, Nieder appeared on the cover of the American magazine inspired, distributed nationwide in the United States.

=== Since 2025: Second Book: Trauma: Father ===
In March 2025, RTL Punkt 12 reported on Nieder, who accused Alice Weidel of "double standards." This was followed by hundreds of hate messages and death threats, all of which Nieder filed as official complaints. The incident generated widespread media coverage.

On September 30, 2025, Nieder presented his second book, Trauma: Father – Why childhood wounds make relationships harder and how you can break the cycle of old patterns, published by Malia Verlag. It is his first psychoanalytical book with autobiographical self-help elements.

== Social commitment ==
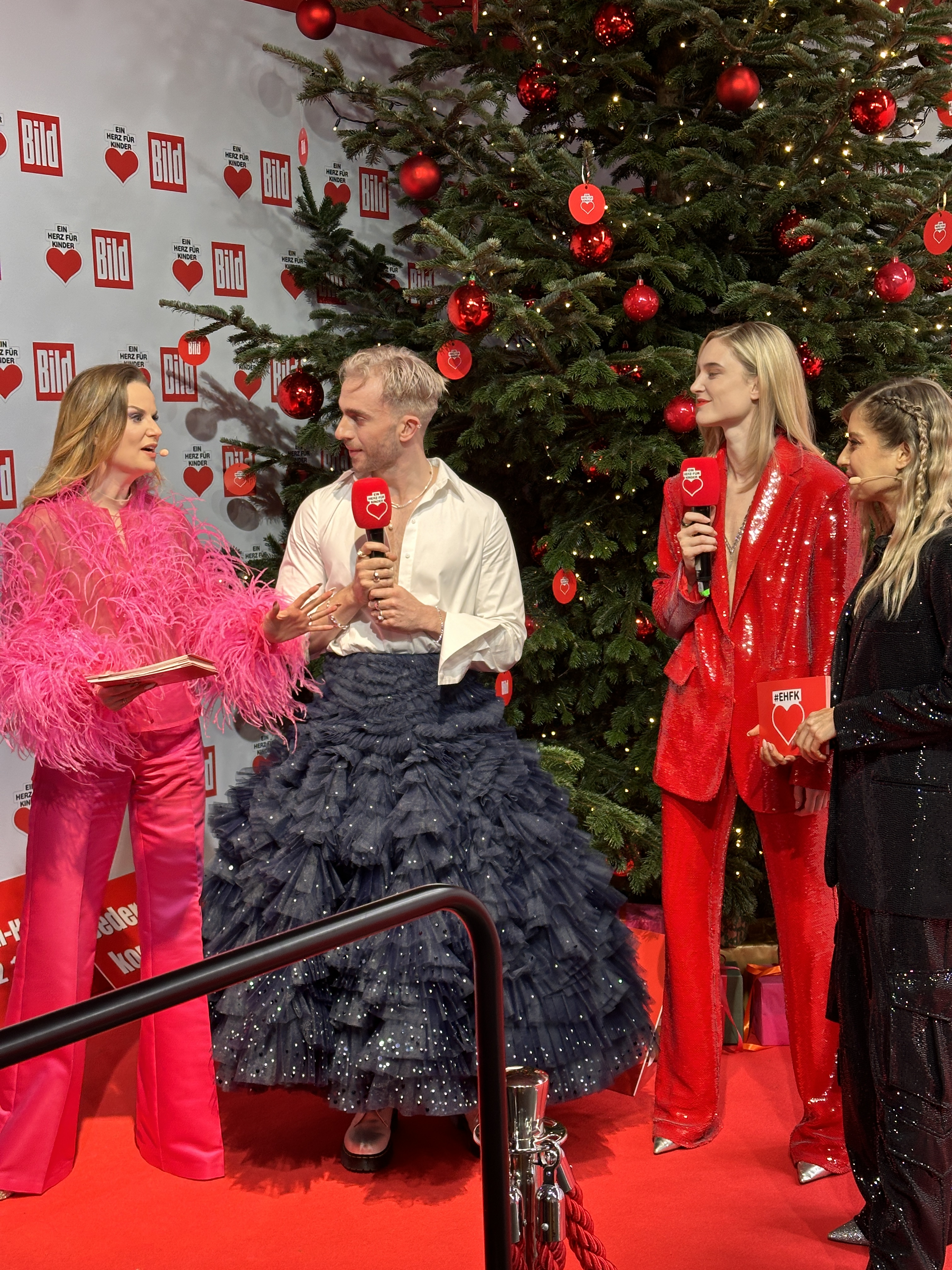
Nieder with Kim Hnizdo (on the left) at a charity TV show in December 2023

In February 2024 Nieder called for an amendment to Article 3 of the Basic Law at the German Bundestag which would ensure that it fully protects both sexual identity and gender identity. He spoke primarily with the politician and chairwoman of Alliance 90/The Greens, Ricarda Lang. The conversation was accompanied and broadcast worldwide by Deutsche Welle.

== Nominations ==
- 2021: GQ Man of the Year

== Literature ==
- Felix Nieder: When my gay self died (August 2, 2023)
- Felix Nieder: Trauma: Father
