= Dawid Tomaszewski =

Polish-born British fashion designer

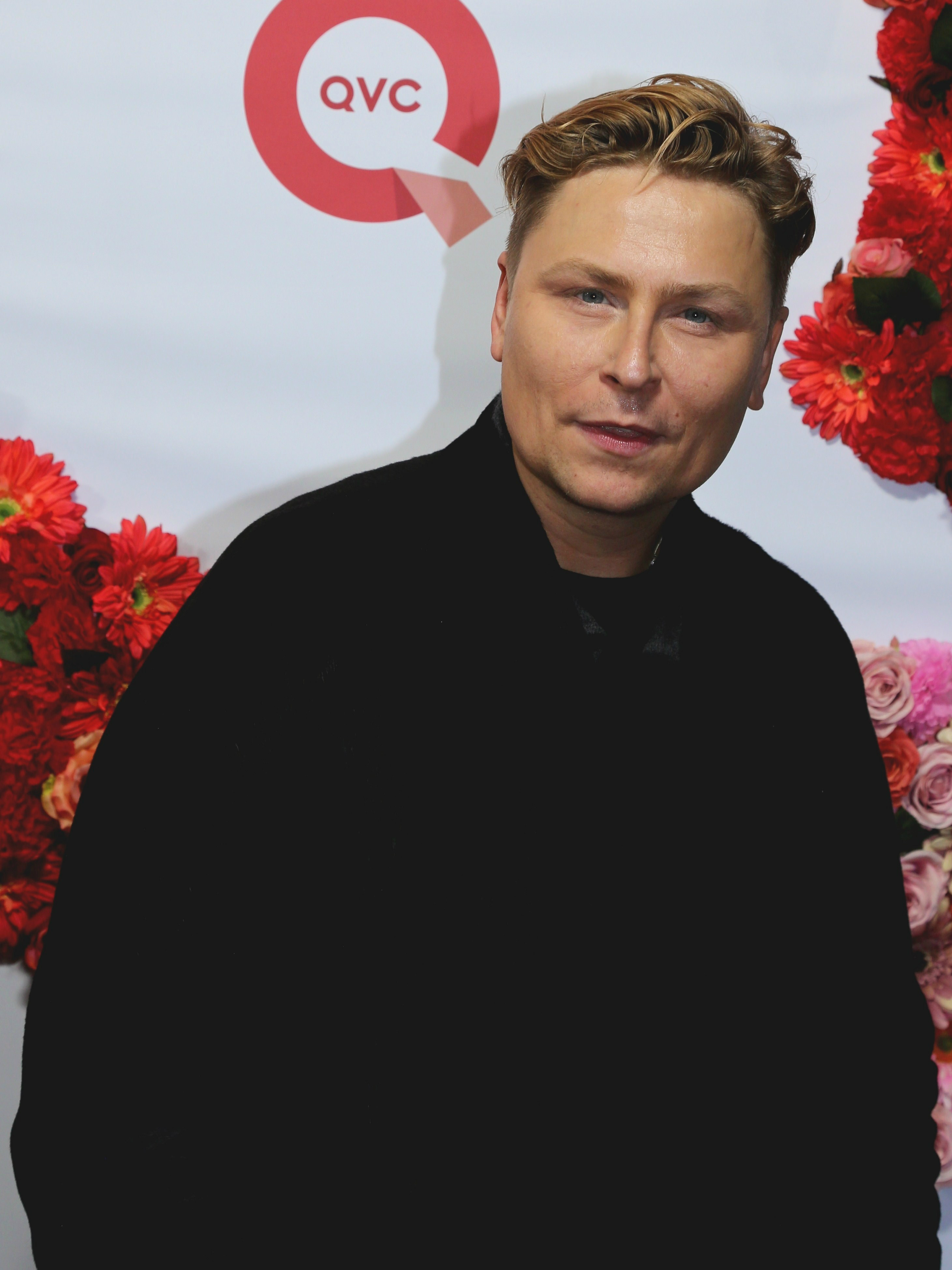
Dawid Tomaszewski

Dawid Tomaszewski (born 21 November 1979 in Gdańsk, Poland) is a Polish art fashion designer who divides his time between London, United Kingdom, and Berlin, Germany.

== Life and works ==
Tomaszewski studied at London College of Fashion and Akademie der Künste Berlin. He also studied history of art at University of Fine Arts in Poznań.

In 2008 he took part in a TV show the next fashion talent and was selected to design a bag for Design Hotels. In the same year he designed a charity T-shirt for Hallhuber.

The following year brought the Designer for tomorrow competition, where he got into the final.

At the end of 2008 he launched a label under his own name. He was awarded with Young designer award in January 2010. Additionally he exhibited at the Premium exhibition in Berlin. That collection brought him several publications in Vogue, Elle, Vanity Fair, and other magazines.

The Spring/Summer 2011 collection Torqued Ellipses, inspired by renowned artist Richard Serra brought a great deal of interest toward his label. It was presented at the Mercedes-Benz Fashion Week Berlin and Fashion Week Poland in Łódź.

In 2022 he presented a wedding skirt for the first time on the european-known male model Felix Nieder with holding up the sign "Love is Love". The German media was discussing this appearance whether men could also wear women's dresses.

== Contests ==
- 2005 Awarded with „Zlota Kredka”, Lodz (Poland)
- 2008 Finalist at „Designer For Tomorrow“, Berlin
- 2009 Awarded with „Premium Young Designer Award“, Berlin
- 2011 Awarded with honorary Award „Golden Thread“, Lodz (Poland)

== Collections ==
- S/S 2010 “REFLECTION”
- F/W 2010/11 “CREPSCULAR MAZE”
- S/S 2011 "TORQUED ELLIPSES”
- F/W 2011/12 "KALEIDOSCOPE“
- S/S 2012 "VANITAS FLOWERS"
- F/W 2012/13 "APOCALYPSE"
