= Sports Car Market =

American car magazine

- Editor: Keith Martin
- Categories: Automobiles
- Frequency: Monthly
- Founded: 1988
- Country: United States
- Based in: Portland, Oregon
- Website: http://www.sportscarmarket.com

Sports Car Market is a magazine based in Portland, Oregon that covers the auctions of vehicles and other aspects of car collecting.

== History and profile ==
Keith Martin started the magazine, originally called the Alfa Romeo Market Letter, in 1988. The newsletter expanded to become the Sports Car Market Letter in 1993. Martin also published the magazine.
