= Elmshorn =

- Town
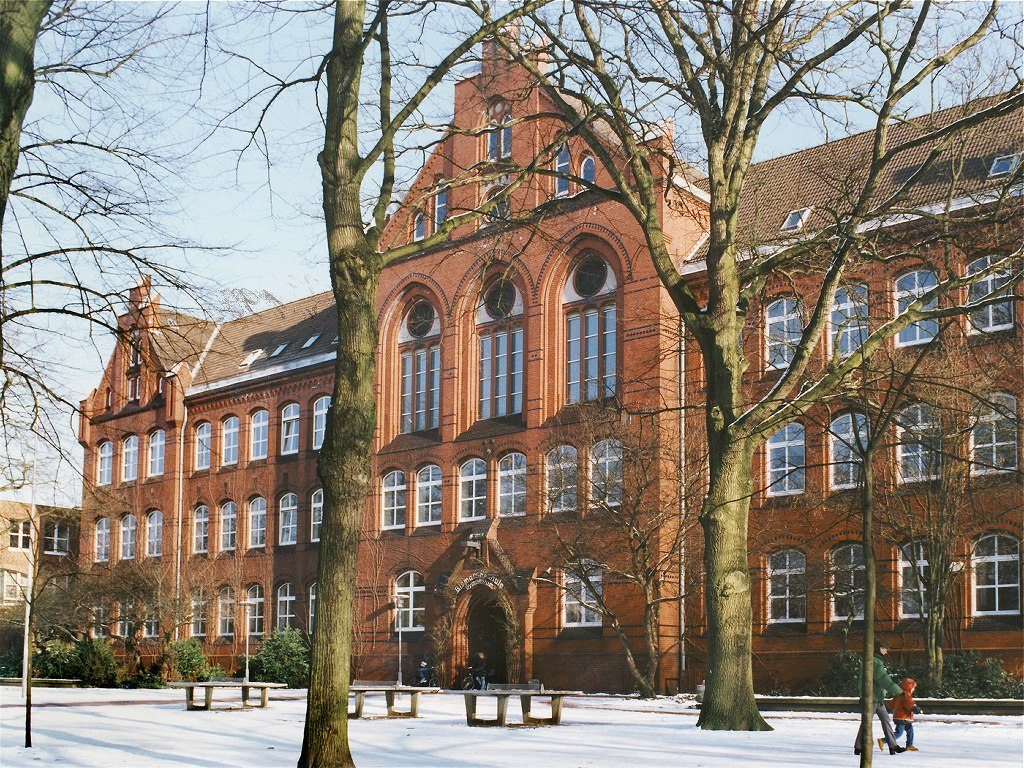
- Bismarck School in Elmshorn

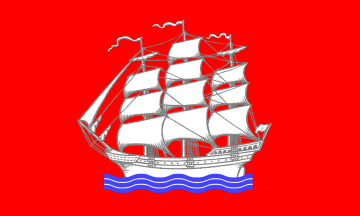
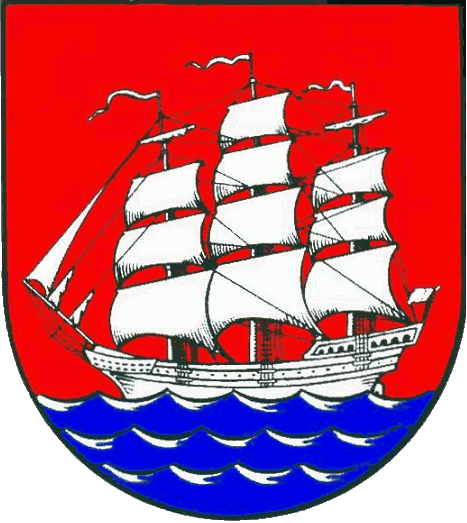
- Flag Coat of arms

- Location of Elmshorn within Pinneberg district
- Interactive map of Elmshorn
- Location within Germany Location within Schleswig-Holstein
- Coordinates: 53°45′7″N 9°39′04″E
- Country: Germany
- State: Schleswig-Holstein
- District: Pinneberg

Government
  - Mayor: Volker Hatje (Ind.)

Area
  - Total: 21.36 km^{2} (8.25 sq mi)
- Elevation: 0–21 m (0–69 ft)

Population (2025-12-31)
  - Total: 51,375
  - Density: 2,405/km^{2} (6,229/sq mi)
- Time zone: UTC+01:00 (CET)
  - Summer (DST): UTC+02:00 (CEST)
- Postal codes: 25335, 25336, 25337
- Dialling codes: 04121
- Vehicle registration: PI
- Website: www.elmshorn.de

Elmshorn (German pronunciation: [ɛlmsˈhɔʁn]; Low German: Elmshoorn) is a town in the district of Pinneberg in Schleswig-Holstein in Germany. It is 30 km north of Hamburg on the small river Krückau, a tributary of the Elbe, and with about 50,000 inhabitants is the sixth-largest town in the state of Schleswig-Holstein, Germany. It is the birthplace of writer and editor Hermann Schlüter (1851–1919), the mathematician Hermann Weyl (1885–1955) and the medievalist Heinz Woehlk (1944- ).

== Economy and industry ==
Historically, Elmshorn was home to many companies in the food industry, including those engaged in meat processing and sausage production, margarine production and cereal processing. Major surviving companies include Dölling-Hareico (meat processing/sausage production) and Kölln (cereal processing, mainly oats and muesli).

== Twin towns – sister cities ==
Elmshorn is twinned with:

- Tarascon, France (1987)
- Wittenberge, Germany (1990)
- Stargard, Poland (1993)
- Raisio, Finland (2000)

== Education ==
The private university Nordakademie Hochschule der Wirtschaft is situated in Elmshorn.

== Notable people ==
The following people were born in Elmshorn (in order of year of birth):

- Johann Christoph Biernatzki (1795–1840), writer.
- Johannes Rehmke (1848 in Hainholz – 1930), philosopher
- Fritz Höger (1877–1949), (born in Bekenreihe near Elmshorn), architect
- Hermann Weyl (1885–1955), mathematician, theoretical physicist, logician and philosopher.
- Carl August Rathjens (1887–1966), geographer
- Harald Paulsen (1895–1954), actor and director
- Walter Ohmsen (1911–1988), highly decorated Kriegsmarine Officer in WWII, in the 1950s-60s, a West German Navy Officer and organized the sailing at the Summer Olympics in the 1960s-70s.
- Karsten Voigt (born 1941), politician and member of the SPD
- Anders Petersen (born 1959), Cultural Prize 2002, graphic artist and object artist
- Gaby Tiedemann (Ixi) (born 1962), singer and one-hit wonder
- Anka Feldhusen (born 1966), diplomat; German ambassador in Kyiv, Ukraine since 2019
- Sören Sieg (born 1966), tenor, songwriter, composer, arranger, satirist, columnist and writer.
- Michael Stich (born 1968), tennis player (grew up in Elmshorn); 1992 Summer Olympics men's doubles winner
- Tim Mälzer (born 1971), cook and author of cookery books
- Birgit Hesse (born 1975), politician (SPD)
- Chiara Schoras (born 1975), actress
- Hanno Behrens (born 1990), soccer player, over 400 pro games
- Felix Nieder (born 1993), model and author
- Daniel Kölbl (born 1993), politician (CDU)

== See also ==
- Kooperative Gesamtschule Elmshorn
- Norbert Schücking
