= Bonames =

- Quarter of Frankfurt am Main
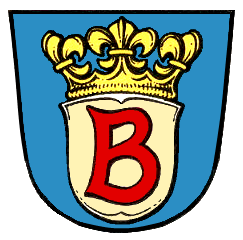
- Coat of arms

- Location of Bonames (red) and the Ortsbezirk Nord-Ost (light red) within Frankfurt am Main
- Interactive map of Bonames
- Location within Germany Location within Hesse
- Coordinates: 50°11′07″N 008°39′53″E
- Country: Germany
- State: Hesse
- Admin. region: Darmstadt
- District: Urban district
- City: Frankfurt am Main

Area
  - Total: 3.353 km^{2} (1.295 sq mi)

Population (2020-12-31)
  - Total: 6,450
  - Density: 1,920/km^{2} (4,980/sq mi)
- Time zone: UTC+01:00 (CET)
  - Summer (DST): UTC+02:00 (CEST)
- Postal codes: 60437
- Dialling codes: 069
- Vehicle registration: F
- Website: www.bonames.de

Bonames (German pronunciation: [bonaˈmeːs]) is a quarter of Frankfurt am Main, Germany. It is part of the Ortsbezirk Nord-Ost.

The name comes from the Latin phrase "bona mansio" (literally: good harborage) which has its roots in the time of the Roman rule.
