= Johann Christoph Biernatzki =

Johann Christoph Biernatzki (1795–1840) was a German author.

== Biography ==
He was born at Elmshorn, in the Duchy of Holstein, and, from 1825 to 1840, served as a Lutheran pastor at Friedrichstadt in the province of Schleswig. His most important publication is Die Hallig, oder die Schiffbrüchigen auf dem Eiland in der Nordsee (“The Hallig, or Shipwrecks on an Island of the North Sea”), with introduction by Düntzer (1881), which is still valued for its accurate description of the pastor's personal experiences during the floods which frequently desolated Schleswig. His complete works, including tales, poems, and didactic treatises, were published after his death in 8 volumes (Leipzig, 1852).
