= Bremer Tageszeitung AG =

German publisher

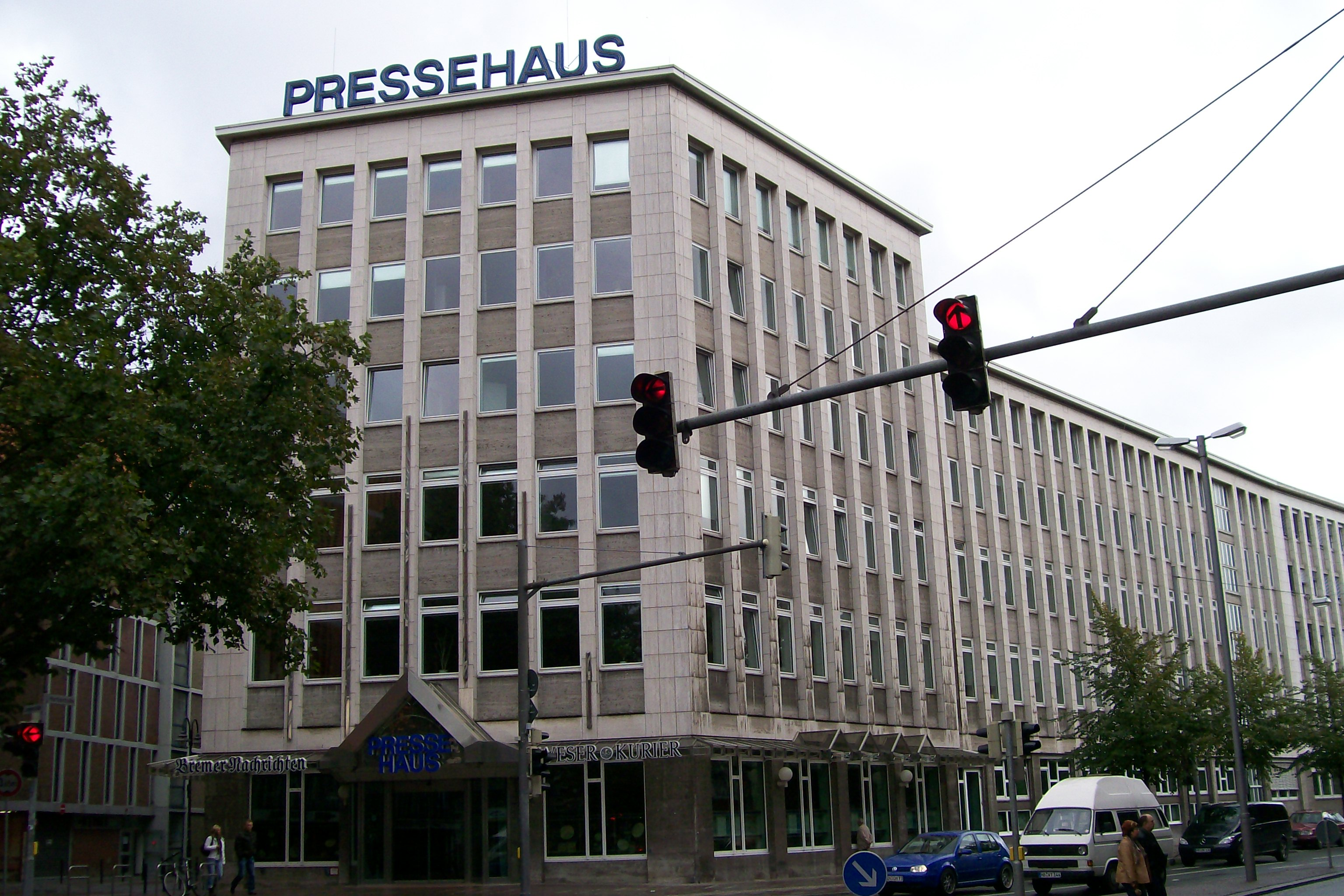
The press house in Bremen:home to the newspapers "Bremer Nachrichten and Weser-Kurier"

The Bremer Tageszeitung AG (BTAG) (Bremer newspaper AG) is a publishing house that publishes various regional newspapers in the city of Bremen and nearby regions in Lower Saxony.

The daily newspaper Weser-Kurier (WK) is the main product. The WK forms the title pages of the local newspapers Bremer Nachrichten and Verdener Nachrichten as well as the Sunday newspaper Kurier am Sonntag, which appear in Bremen and the lower Saxon environs. In addition, there are some regional or local side dishes. The sold circulation amounts to 126,485 copies. That is a drop of 37.3 per cent since 1998.

The publishing house is located in Bremen and had till 2019 its own printing house in the Woltmershausen district. BTAG was founded in 1945 under commercial law as a public limited company and is owned half by the Bremen family Hackmack and Hamburg photographer Christian Güssow. Since at least 1999 the two owners of the publishing house have been in conflict with each other, blocking important decisions.

== History ==
Logo of Bremer Nachrichten

Today's Bremer Nachrichten (Bremen News) is identical to Weser-Kurier, which was first published on January 7, 1743 under the name Bremer Wöchentlichen Nachrichten (Bremen Weekly News). Bremer Nachrichten is with four other papers one of the oldest newspapers still published in Germany. Also it is the seventh oldest daily newspaper in the world.

In 1945 the social-democratic journalist and publisher Hans Hackmack received from the military government of the American Zone a license to publish a newspaper. The newspaper received the name Weser-Kurier. It was one of the first licensed newspapers in occupied Germany after the Second World War and appeared on four sides for the first time on 19 September 1945. At this time Weser-Kurier cost 20 pfennigs and was available on Wednesdays and Saturdays with a circulation of 150,000 copies. The Bremer Nachrichten was allowed to appear only in 1949; they could not make up for the advantage that the Weser-Kurier had. The editorial content was controlled by the US military government in 1945/46, but soon the editorial staff worked independently. In 1946 the Weser-Kurier GmbH was founded. The Weser-Kurier appeared as a nonpartisan newspaper, initially with a social-liberal expression.

Bremer Nachrichten was re-established after WWII in 1949 and recognized side by side with Weser-Kurier till the 1970s. In 1949, the newspaper was printed externally by Schünemann-Verlag of Bremer Nachrichten. From September 1949 the newspaper was published every working day.
