= Iso Varedo =

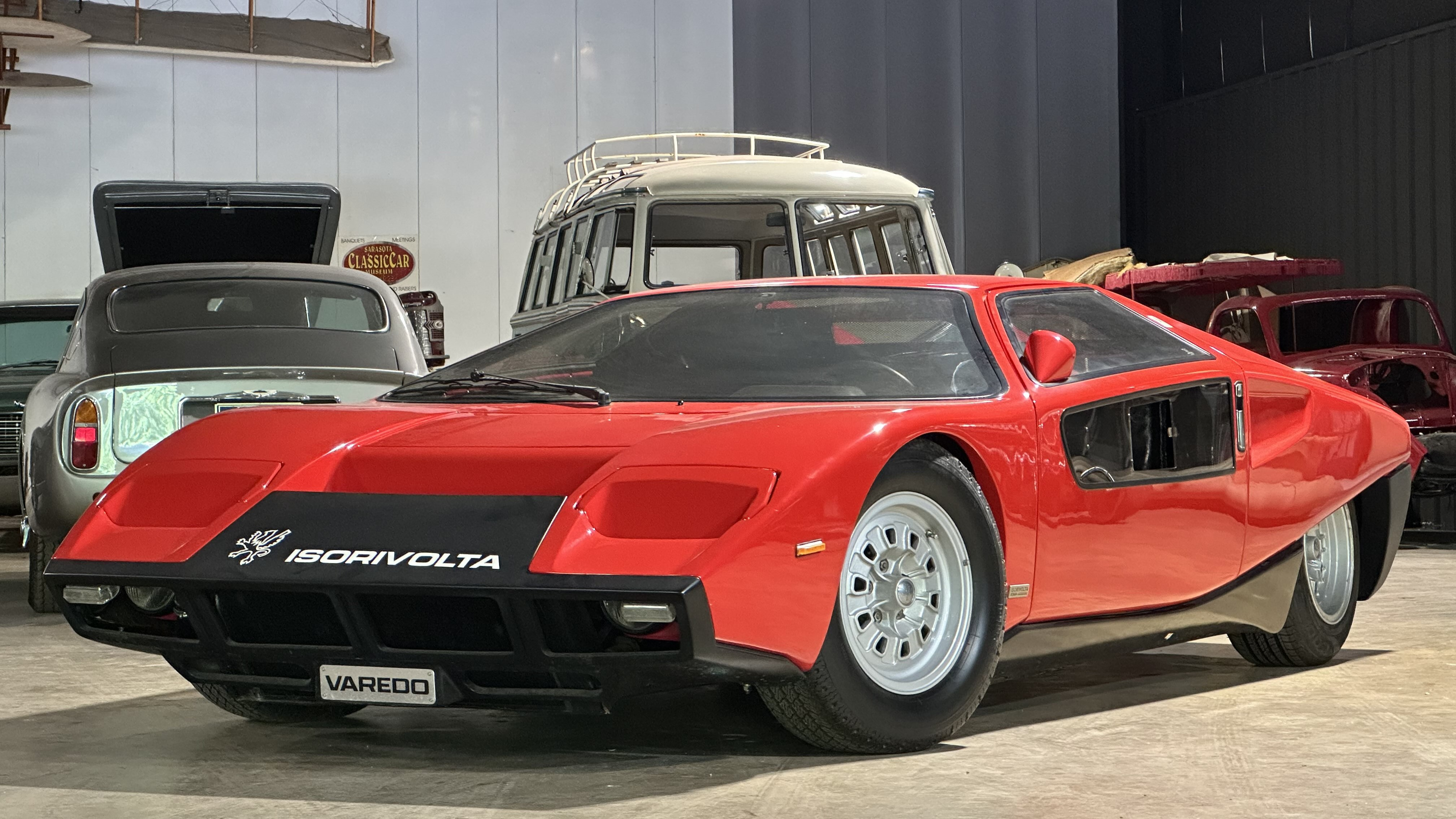

Overview
- Manufacturer: Iso Autoveicoli S.p.A.
- Production: 1972
- Designer: Ercole Spada

Body and chassis
- Class: Sports car
- Body style: 2-door coupe
- Layout: MR Layout

Powertrain
- Engine: 5762cc (5.7L) Ford 351 Cleveland V8
- Power output: 325 bhp (242 kW, 329 PS)
- Transmission: 5-speed manual

Dimensions
- Length: 4,125 mm (162.4 in)
- Width: 1,930 mm (76.0 in)
- Height: 1049 mm (41.3 in)
- Curb weight: 1200 kg (2,645 lbs)

The Iso Varedo was a concept car produced by Italian car manufacturer Iso Autoveicoli S.p.A. in 1972 styled by Ercole Spada. It was unveiled at the 1972 Turin Motor Show. Only one Varedo was ever built. It currently resides at the Sarasota Classic Car Museum in Florida. An AMC AMX/3 chassis formed the technical basis for the 1972 Iso Varedo concept.

== Performance ==
The Varedo is powered by a mid-mounted 351 cubic inches (5.7L) Ford 351 Cleveland V8 making 325 bhp (242 kW). Power is driven to the rear wheels through a ZF 5-speed manual transmission. The Varedo also used a full fiberglass body in order to save weight.
