= Iso (automobile) =

Italian automobile manufacturer

ISO Autoveicoli S.p.A.
- Industry: Automotive
- Founded: 1938
- Headquarters: Bresso, Italy
- Key people: Renzo Rivolta (founder)
- Products: Automobiles, Motorbikes

ISO Rivolta is an Italian car and motorbike manufacturer active in the motor vehicle sector since 1938. Over the years, the company has taken various names, including Isothermos, Iso Autoveicoli Spa in 1952, Iso Rivolta in 1962, Iso Motors in 1973 and, in 2017, a return to ISO Rivolta.

== History ==
ISO Rivolta has its origins in Isothermos of Bolzaneto, a factory producing electric heaters and chillers, purchased by the engineer Renzo Rivolta in 1939 and moved to Bresso in 1942, after a bombing raid on Genoa destroyed the offices. Immediately after the end of World War II, Renzo Rivolta decided to devote his company to the production of motorbikes, a type of market that offered significant commercial profits in those years.

=== Early years: motorcycles ===
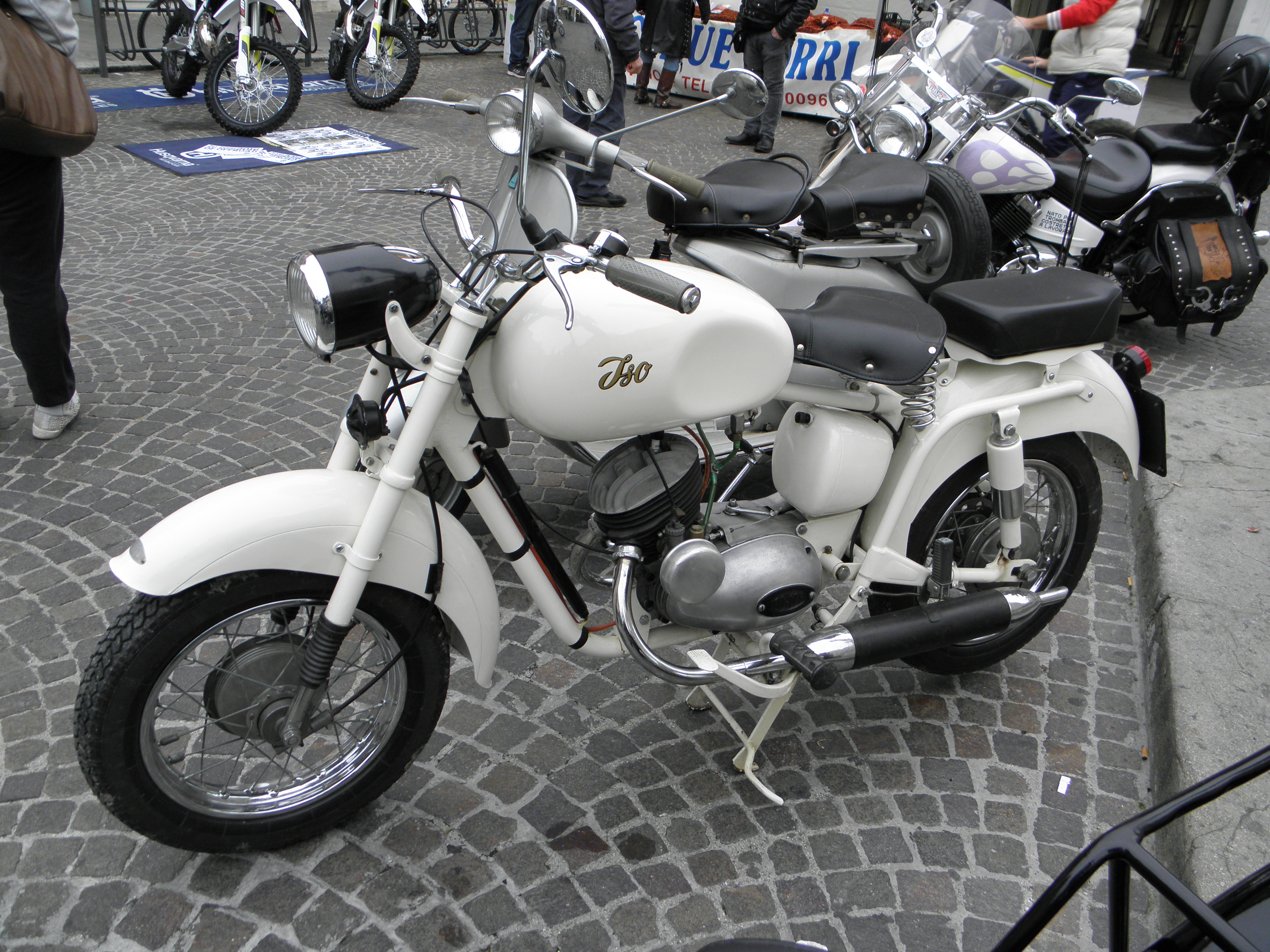
ISOmoto

The ISO Scooter was one of the company's early vehicles. It was equipped with a twin-cylinder engine inspired by the 125 Puch. Together with the Isomoto, the company was encouraged to add new versions and models such as the Isocarro, Iso GT, Iso Sport and Iso Ciclo.

In 1957, developing a project created on behalf of Maserati, the company replaced the now obsolete Iso 125 with a new model (ISO F/150) with more compliant lines that did not disappoint expectations. It remained in production until 1962, when the Iso company limited its production solely to cars. In 1961, a final 500 cm^{3} motorbike with a boxer engine was presented, but never went into production.

=== Cars ===
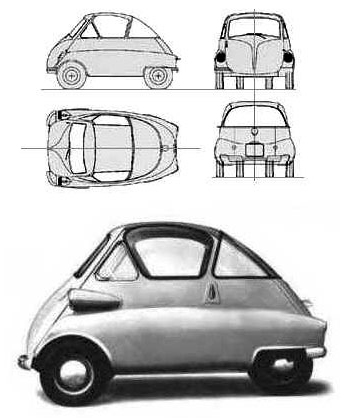
ISO Isetta Turismo

In the early 1950s, Renzo Rivolta developed the concept for a car that was halfway between a car and a motorbike, to bridge the gap between the classic motorcycle and the cheapest Italian car of the time, the FIAT 500 Topolino. The idea was to create a motorbike with a body in order to have a vehicle that was equally as economical, but with the protection offered by a normal car.

The company register changed to ISO Autoveicoli and in 1953 the Isetta was launched. The Isetta featured a distinctive "egg" shape, and was powered by the engine already fitted on the ISOmoto 200, albeit increased to 236 cm^{3} with an aluminum cylinder and chromed cane. It was a sort of cabin scooter, with four wheels (the two rear were fixed, closer to each other) and a cockpit for two passengers, with only one way in: the front door, which was designed to be the car's nose as well, including the windscreen and steering wheel.

The Isetta was not a great success in Italy. Therefore, Renzo Rivolta decided to license the project abroad. The result was the VELAM Isetta for the French market and the ROMI Isetta for the Brazilian and South American markets in general, and then the BMW Isetta. The Bavarian company was far from being a healthy company due to an unfavorable post-war reorganization and the unsuccessful high-end models it offered after the war. The launch of the BMW 250, i.e., the BMW-branded Isetta, was much more successful than in Italy. In the end, a total of 160,000 units were produced and sold.

At the end of 1956, production of the ISO Isetta ceased. In the meantime, the Bresso-based company built the Iso 400, a small, more conventional car with a three-volume body that remained at the prototype stage.

At the beginning of 1957, ISO ended its activities in the fields of microcars and motorbikes. Renzo Rivolta aimed to take a new direction and, from the ashes of ISO Autoveicoli, founded ISO Rivolta — a car manufacturer targeting the narrow market of high-end Gran Turismos, with production halfway between the GTs of the German or American school and the GTs of the Italian school.

The real transition to passenger car production took place in 1962 with the public presentation of the ISO Rivolta IR 300, a luxury coupé designed by Bertone (through Giorgetto Giugiaro’s sketches) with a chassis developed by Eng. Giulio Alfieri and powered by a V8 engine from a Chevrolet Corvette. The 300 in the name indicated the engine output: 300 hp. From that moment on, it was also clear what kind of cars the Iso would produce: high-performance grand touring cars with top-level finishes.

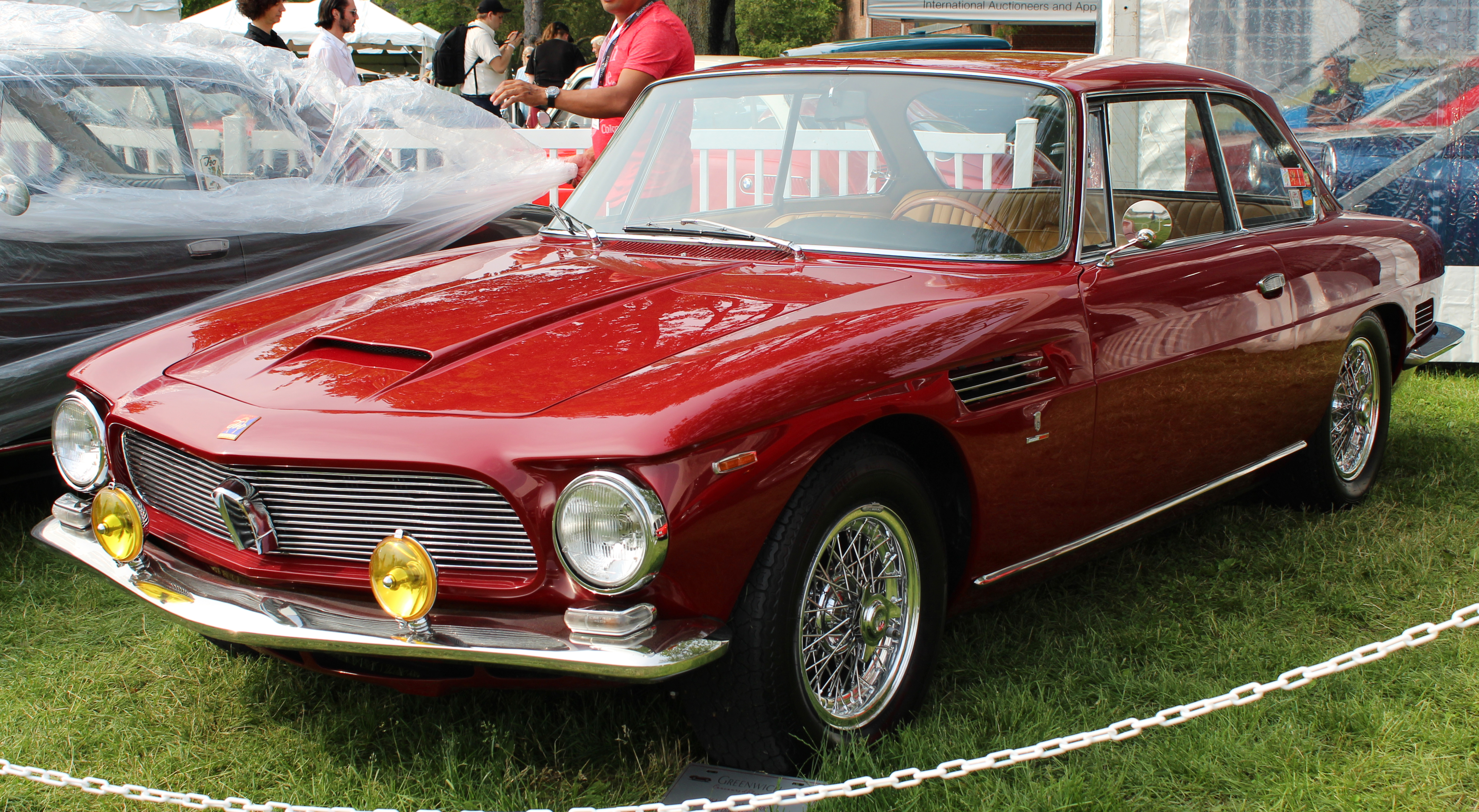
The IR 300 was ISO's first Grand Tourer

In 1963, the ISO A3 was built and exhibited on the ISO Rivolta stand at the Turin Auto Show. Intended for racing with the acronym A3/C, it was entrusted to Giotto Bizzarrini, who was hired by Iso as a track engineer. The bodywork, on the other hand, was made at Piero Drogo's Carrozzeria Sports Cars in Modena using 1,700 rivets. In fact, the second Iso model was nicknamed millechiodi. In 1965, the berlinetta version of the A3 was sold to the actor and singer Johnny Hallyday, who helped make it a lifestyle icon.

=== ISO Grifo A 3 L ===
With the start of sales in the United States and the signing of a stable powertrain contract with General Motors, the company began the production of a new lineup of models based on the GT 300 chassis (standard, extended or shortened). The result was the Grifo sports coupé (1965), with engines from 5.4 to 7 liters, the Fidia luxury saloon (1968) and the Lele 2+2 grand tourer (1969) designed by Marcello Gandini, chief designer at Bertone.

By the end of 1971, due to the unfavorable economic conditions imposed by GM (demanding advance payment for the engines, which had to be purchased in blocks), the company adopted Ford Cleveland engines. Competition from prestigious brands, especially Maserati and Aston Martin (but also, for some models, Ferrari and Lamborghini), and the oil crisis of 1973, put ISO Rivolta in financial jeopardy.

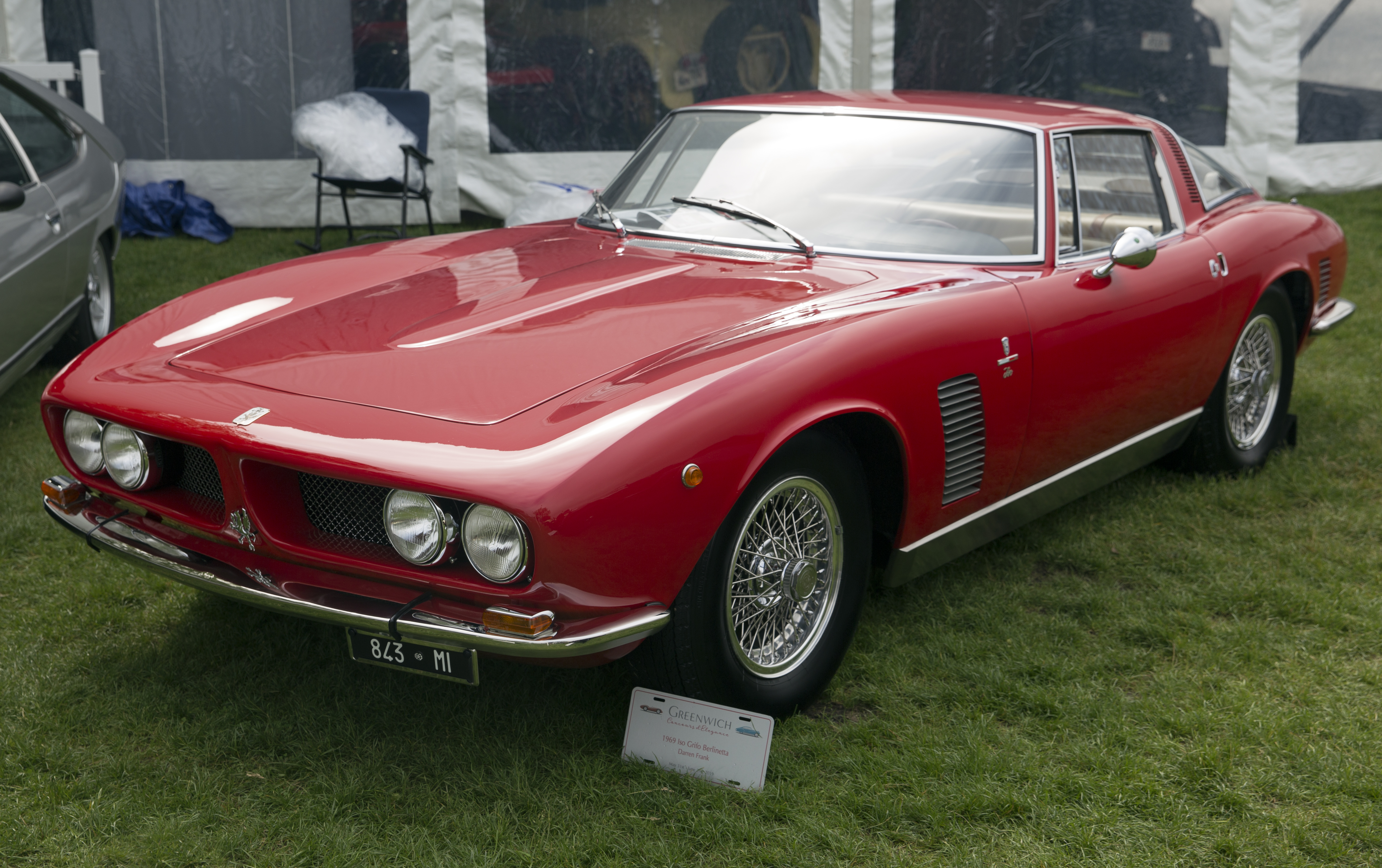
The ISO Grifo became the company's best known model, but also laid the ground for the Rivolta/Bizzarrini split

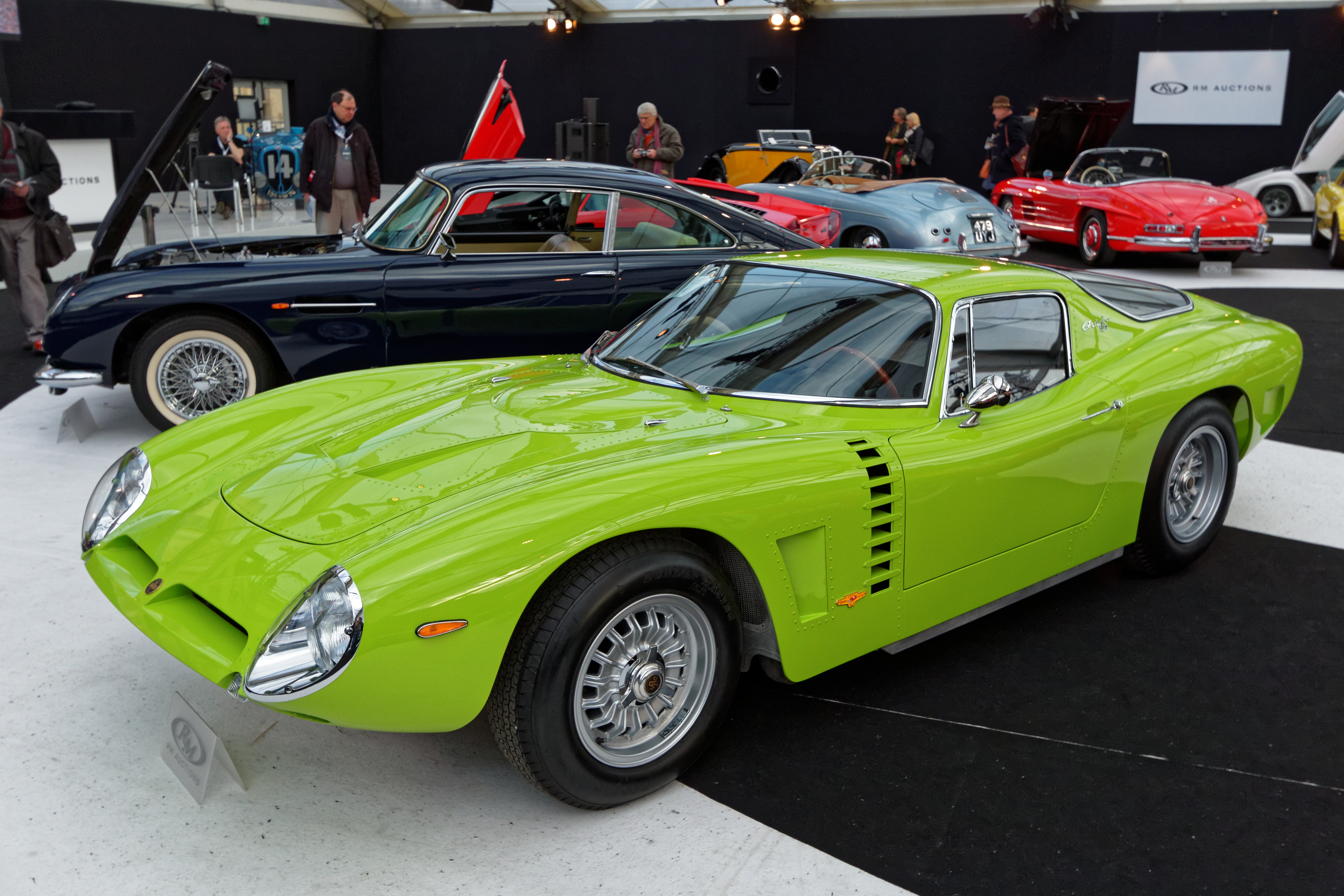
The A3C was meant to be the racing variant of the Grifo, but only 22 were built before Bizzarrini split from the company to make his own variation

At the beginning of 1973, the Rivolta family listed the company on the New York Stock Exchange. An agreement with Philip Morris and the young team manager Frank Williams led to the formation of the Iso-Marlboro Formula 1 team (the original name of Frank Williams Racing Cars).

The business name of the company changed to ISO Motors & Co. due to the raking in of the stock exchange shares made by the Italian-American Iso Pera. After producing 10,000 ISO snowmobiles, the Rivolta family eventually gave up ownership.

The costs of managing the team, the drop in sales due to the economic and social crises in the first half of the 1970s and conditions in the U.S. market (where the company was late in obtaining the status of "Small Manufacturer", which applied less stringent sanctions standards) led to the end of car production on December 31, 1974.

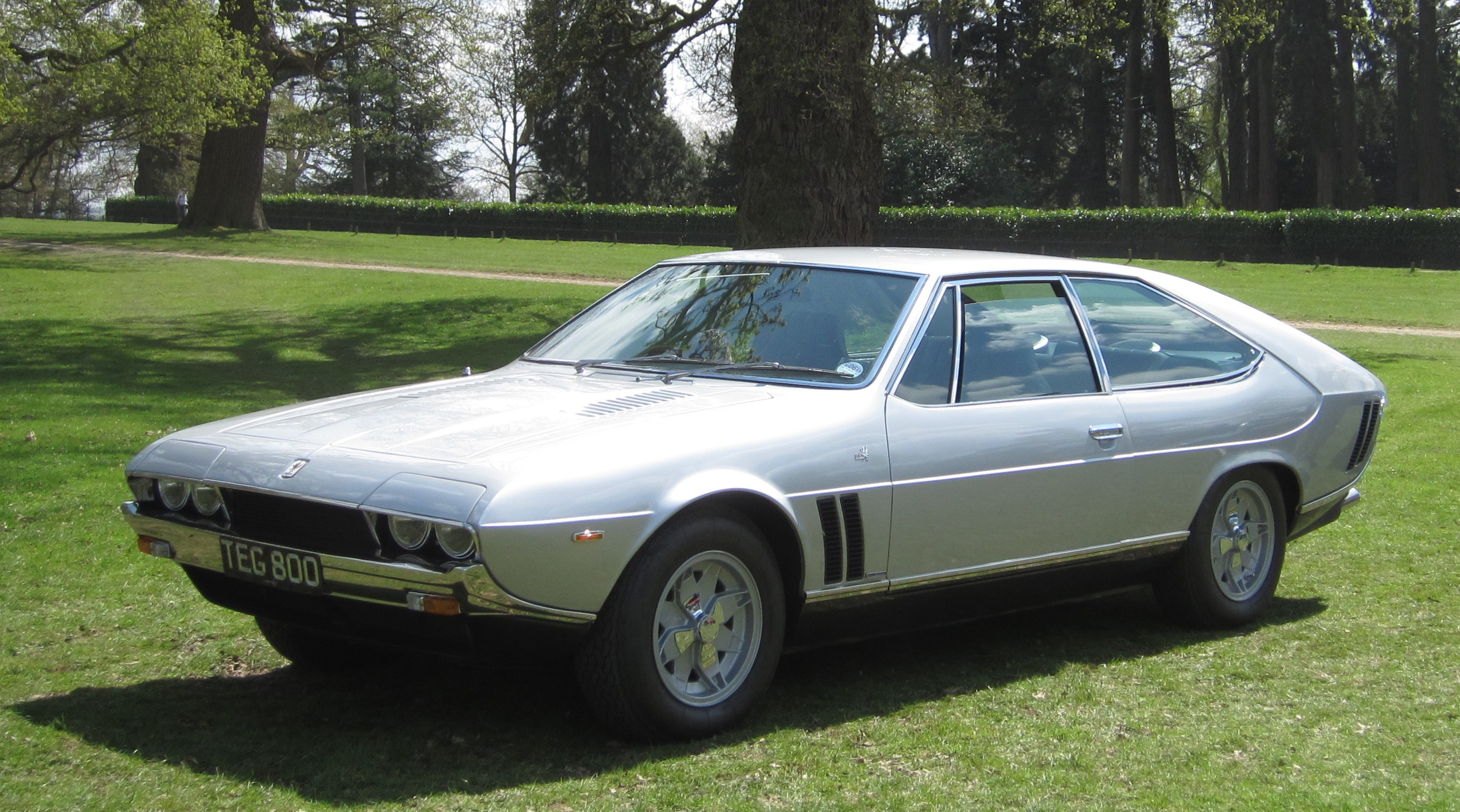
The Lele, named after ISO Chairman Piero's wife, featured angular styling from Marcello Gandini

=== ORSA 850 Spring Special ===
In anticipation of the impact of the oil crisis on granturismo cars, the Rivolta family decided at the end of 1972 to partner with the ORSA company, a modest industrial plant founded by a small group of Sardinian entrepreneurs on the outskirts of Cagliari, equipped for the small-scale construction of retro-style open cars. For this purpose, the Spring model assembly lines were taken over from SIATA, which had closed its doors. Since the FIAT 850, on whose chassis the SIATA Spring was built, was no longer in production, an agreement was made with SEAT, which was still building it in Spain.

=== Legacy ===
The Museo ISO Rivolta is a project that has been in development for years, with a plan to inhabit the former warehouses of the historic factory in Bresso. It was intended to collect motorbikes and cars. In 2008, the municipal administration dedicated a newly built street in the former factory area of Bresso to the Isetta.

One of the two surviving warehouses of the Bresso factory has housed the new post office of the municipality since 2013.

=== Refounding ===
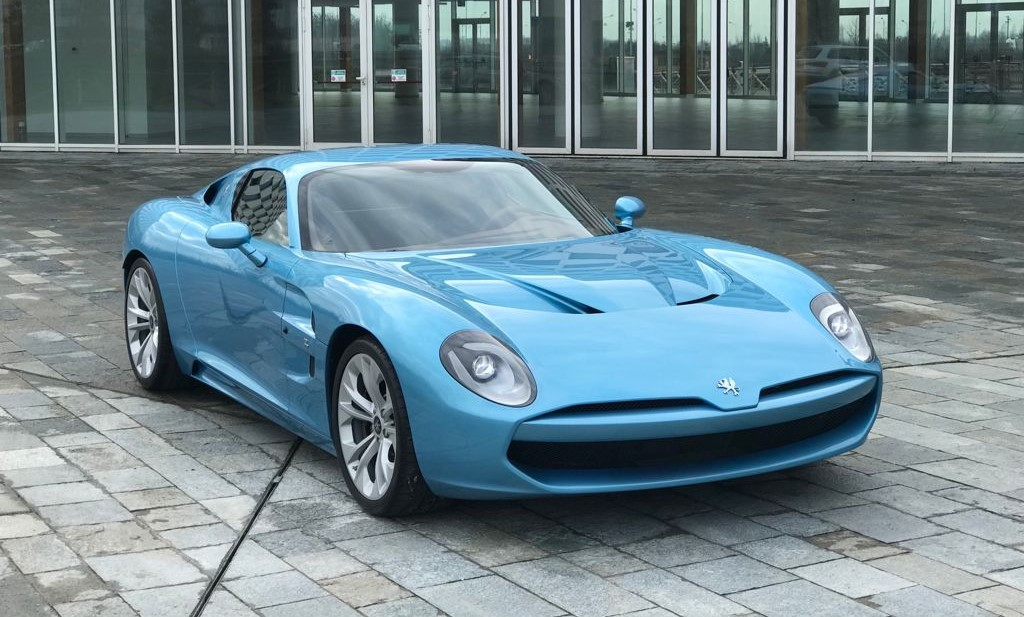
2021 ISO Rivolta GTZ at the Arese track in 2021

In 2017, after an initiative by Atelier Zagato, the ISO Rivolta brand was brought back to life, with its name changed to ISO Rivolta S.p.A.. It was first placed on the Vision concept car, created to race virtually in SONY PlayStation's GranTurismo and adopted by over 120,000 gamers.

This success led to the Rivolta family's decision to revive the company with its first GT model of the new millennium, the GTZ. The design and production of these exclusive collectible cars were entrusted to Zagato. The technological partnership with GM's Chevrolet Corvette for the project is a historic one, with only 19 GTZs to be produced.

== Production range ==
Data from automobile-catalog.com.

Years	Model	Power	Top speed	Notes	Image
1953–55	Isetta	10 PS (7 kW)	85 km/h (53 mph)		
1963–70	IR 300/340/350	300 PS (221 kW); 340 PS (250 kW); 350 PS (257 kW)	205–258 km/h (127–160 mph)	Chevrolet engine	
1964	Grifo A3 L	365 PS (268 kW)	275 km/h (171 mph)	Chevrolet engine	
1966–72	Grifo Lusso GL 300/340/350	300 PS (221 kW); 340 PS (250 kW); 350 PS (257 kW)	210–260 km/h (130–162 mph)	Chevrolet engine	
1972–74	Grifo IR8	325 PS (239 kW); 330 PS (243 kW)	255 km/h (158 mph)	Ford engine	
1968–70	Grifo 7 Litri	400 PS (294 kW)	300 km/h (186 mph)	Chevrolet engine (427)	
1970–72	Grifo Can Am	400 PS (294 kW)	300 km/h (186 mph)	Chevrolet Engine (427 & 454)	
1968–72	Fidia S4 300/350	300 PS (221 kW); 350 PS (257 kW)	220–240 km/h (136–150 mph)	Chevrolet engine	
1972–74	Fidia IR10	325 PS (239 kW); 330 PS (243 kW)	240 km/h (149 mph)	Ford engine	
1969–72	Lele 300/350	300 PS (221 kW); 350 PS (257 kW)	220–250 km/h (136–155 mph)	Chevrolet engine	
1972–74	Lele IR6	325 PS (239 kW); 330 PS (243 kW)	245 km/h (152 mph)	Ford engine	
2019-	GTZ	659 PS (485 kW)	298 km/h (185 mph)	Chevrolet engine	

=== Concept cars ===
- 1972 ISO Varedo
- 1993 ISO Grifo 90
- 1996 ISO Grifo 96
- 2017 ISO Rivolta Zagato Vision Gran Turismo
