= Iso Lele =

Italian grand tourer

Iso Rivolta Lele Iso Lele
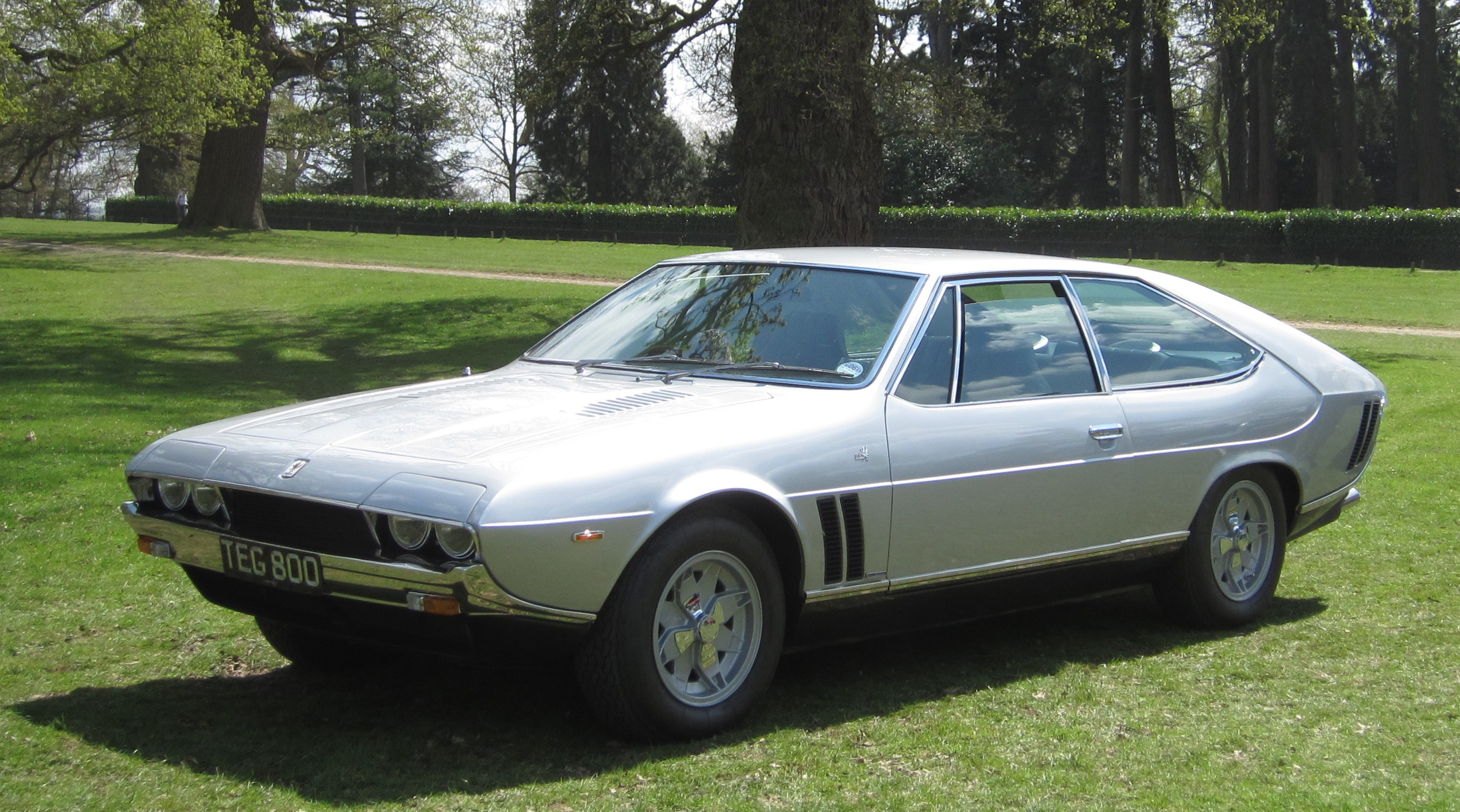
- 1973 Iso Lele IR6

Overview
- Manufacturer: Iso Automoveicoli S.p.A.
- Also called: Iso Lele IR6
- Production: 1969–1974; 285 produced
- Assembly: Italy: Bresso
- Designer: Marcello Gandini at Bertone

Body and chassis
- Class: Grand tourer (S)
- Body style: 2-door 2+2 coupe
- Layout: Front-engine, rear-wheel-drive

Powertrain
- Engine: 5354 cc Chevrolet 327 V8 (1969–1972); 5736 cc Ford 351 V8 (1972–1974)
- Transmission: 4-speed GM Muncie manual; 5-speed ZF manual; 4-speed automatic

Dimensions
- Wheelbase: 2,740 mm (107.9 in)
- Length: 4,650 mm (183.1 in)
- Width: 1,750 mm (68.9 in)
- Height: 1,350 mm (53.1 in)
- Curb weight: 1,610 kg (3,549 lb)

Chronology
- Predecessor: Iso Rivolta IR 300

The Iso Lele (or Iso Rivolta Lele) is a grand tourer that was produced by the Italian automobile manufacturer Iso Automoveicoli S.p.A. between 1969 and 1974. The Lele, being a 2+2-seater, filled the gap between the Grifo and the Fidia while sharing its powertrain with its siblings. The styling was done by Marcello Gandini of Bertone. The car is named after Lele Rivolta, wife of Piero Rivolta (son of Iso company founder Renzo).

== History and overview ==
Meant as a Christmas present for Piere Rivolta's wife Rachelle (LeLe) Rivolta, it was decided to put the car into production to succeed the IR 300. It was first presented to the public at the 1969 New York International Auto Show and was made to compete against the Lamborghini Espada. The car was initially powered by a 300 or 350 hp (224 or 261 kW) General Motors V8 and was available with a 4-speed manual (later a 5-speed unit from ZF Friedrichshafen) and a 4-speed automatic transmission sourced from General Motors. In 1972, after about 125 cars had been produced, General Motors demanded that Iso pay in advance for the engines. Iso chose to replace the Chevrolet engine with Ford's Cleveland V8 rated at 325 hp (242 kW). The automatic transmission was also sourced from Ford, while the manual transmission remained unchanged.

The chassis was the same Bizzarrini designed unit which had found use in Iso automobiles since the IR 300. It had an unequal-length double-wishbones front suspension with coil springs while the rear suspension consisted of a de Dion layout with a Salisbury axle unit. Disc brakes were used on all four wheels and were mounted inboard on the chassis.

The rear suspension had dual trailing arms and a Watts linkage which located the De Dion axle. Koni telescopic shock absorbers and coil springs completed the unit. The Lele came with a ZF power steering which was the same unit used by Maserati and Campagnolo magnesium alloy wheels, wrapped in 215/70 VP15 Michelin XWX tyres.

The interior was upholstered in leather and came with creature comforts like air conditioning and electric windows along with plush carpeting. The speedometer and tachometer were placed behind the steering column while an additional four gauges were present on the centre console which consisted of an ammeter, fuel gauge and water and oil temperature gauges. The car came with a hidden headlamp styling with popup covers partially covering the quad headlamp units when not in use.

In 1973, the standard version (now known as Lele IR6) was joined by the Lele IR6 Sport, with an engine modified to generate 360 hp (268 kW) and only available mated to the ZF 5-speed transmission. The engine had a compression ratio of 8.6:1, had a bore and stroke of 101.6 x 88.9 mm and had a redline of 5,800 rpm. It was based on two bespoke versions made for Iso-Marlboro Formula One team drivers Howden Ganley and Nanni Galli. The variant featured removal of sound deadening components, a new dashboard and engine modifications.

The angular Gandini styled body and the comfortable nature of the car did little to help sales and only 285 cars were made. About 160 Ford-engined Leles had been built by the time production wound up in 1974 due to Iso's bankruptcy.

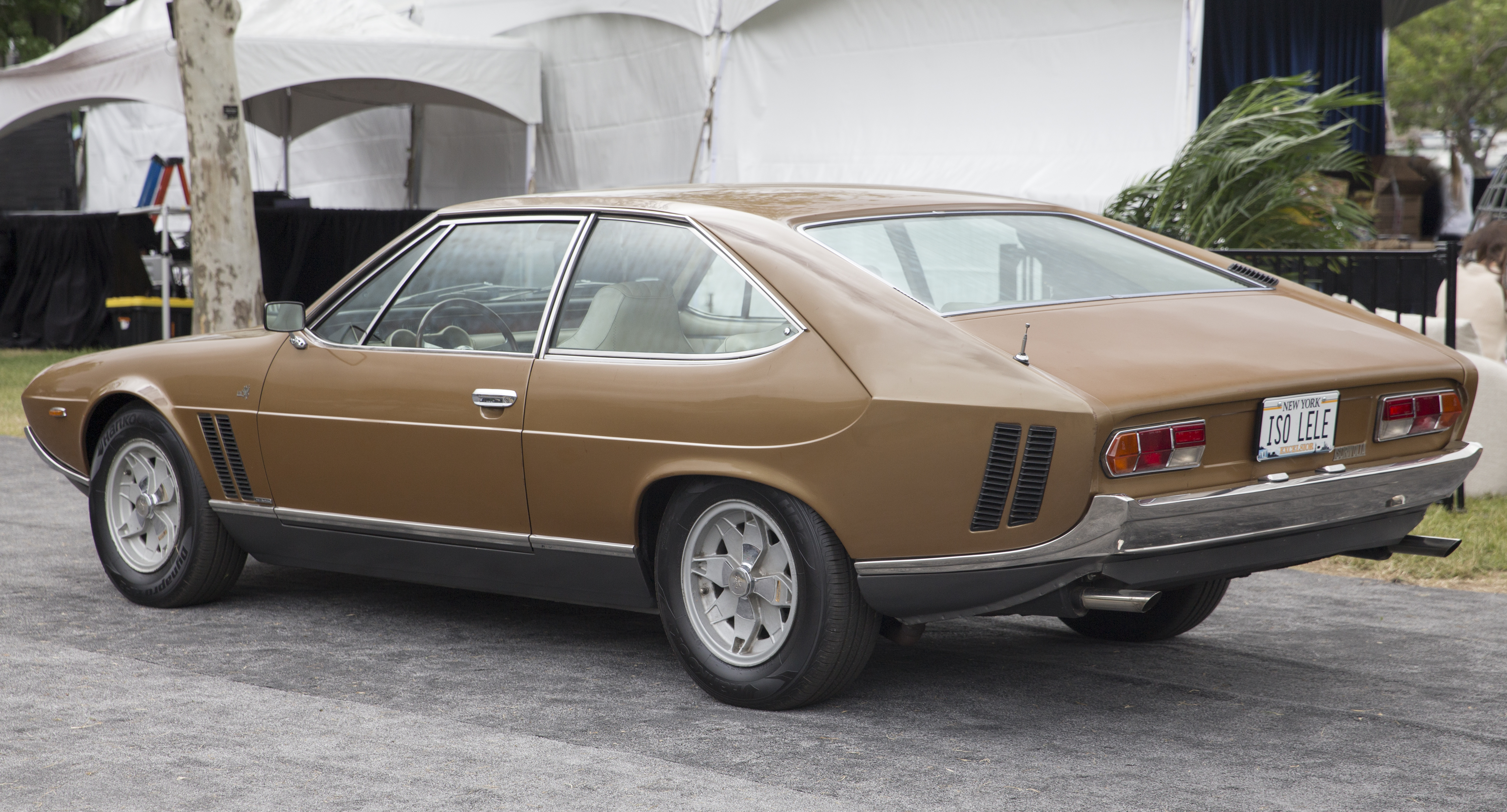
Rear view (1972 Lele IR6)

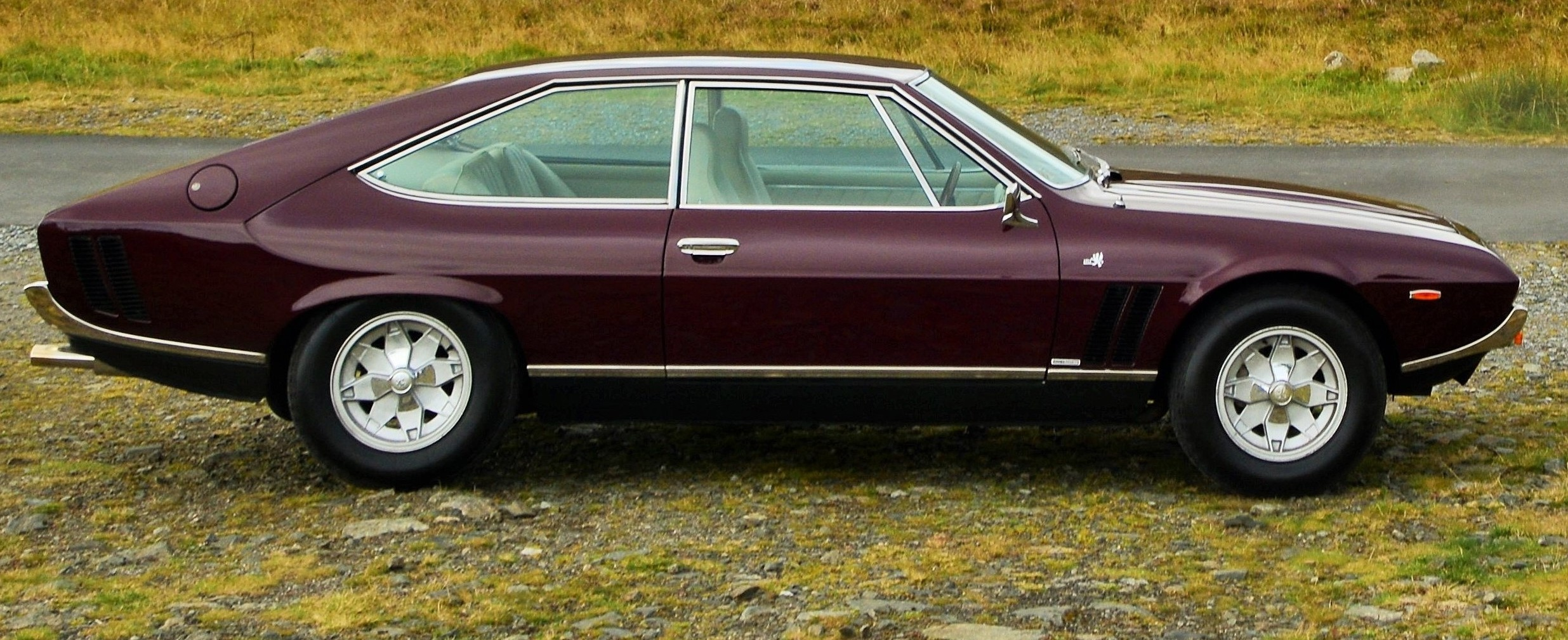
Side profile of Lele

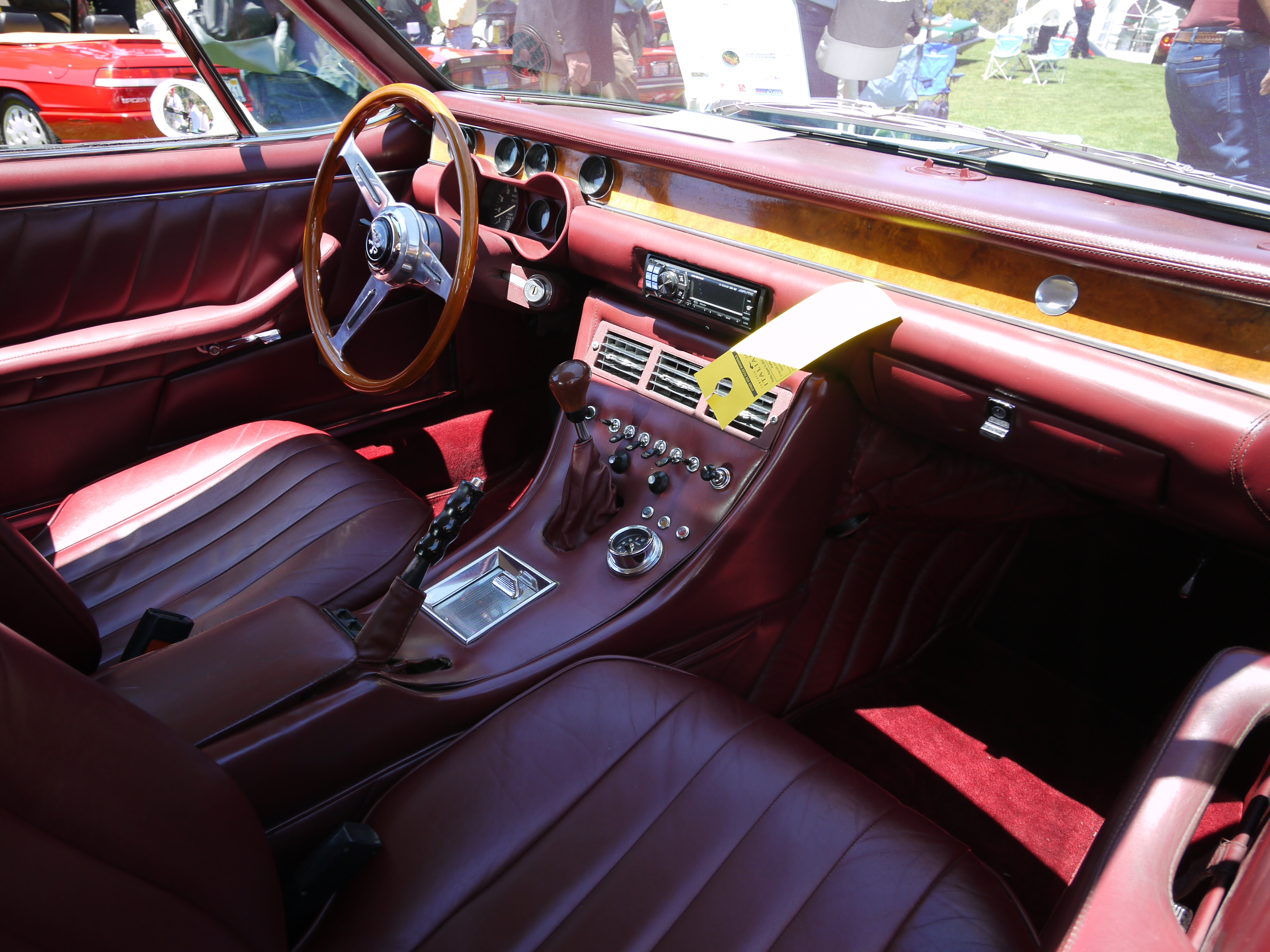
Interior

== Lele IR6 Marlboro ==
Following the agreement with Philip Morris that led to the creation of the Iso-Marlboro brand in Formula 1, Philip Morris commissioned Iso to construct two specially modified Leles for their Formula 1 Team Drivers. Modified by Bizzarrini these two cars were stripped of creature comforts to reduce weight. The cars had subtle differences from each other and no car was identical. The cars, which were made for drivers Howden Ganley and Nanni Galli, had a unique dash layout that did not appear on any other Lele. Bizzarrini then modified the 351 Cobra Jet engine which was now rated at 360 hp (268 kW). Painted in Marlboro Red with Marlboro badges on the front fenders Ganley's car debuted on the Iso Rivolta stand at the 1973 Geneva Auto Show. Galli's car was painted in white. The exterior styling cues from these two cars were used to develop the Lele Sport which also had a modified version of their dash layout. Philip Morris also commissioned at least two more cars for promotional purposes to resemble the Marlboro cars given to its drivers, called the Marlboro Replicas. These cars were essentially Lele Sports with Marlboro badges on the fenders. They also retained the creature comforts removed from the original Marlboro cars.

== Production ==
A breakup of total production of 285 units is as follows:

- Lele, 300 hp (224 kW) (Chevrolet): 112
- Lele, 350 hp (261 kW) (Chevrolet): 13
- Lele IR6, 325 hp (242 kW) (Ford): 135
- Lele IR6 Sport, 360 hp (268 kW) (Ford): 20, including 3 Marlboro replicas)
- Lele IR6 Marlboro, 360 hp (268 kW) (Ford): 2
