= IsoRivolta GTZ =

Italian automobile

Zagato Iso Rivolta GTZ
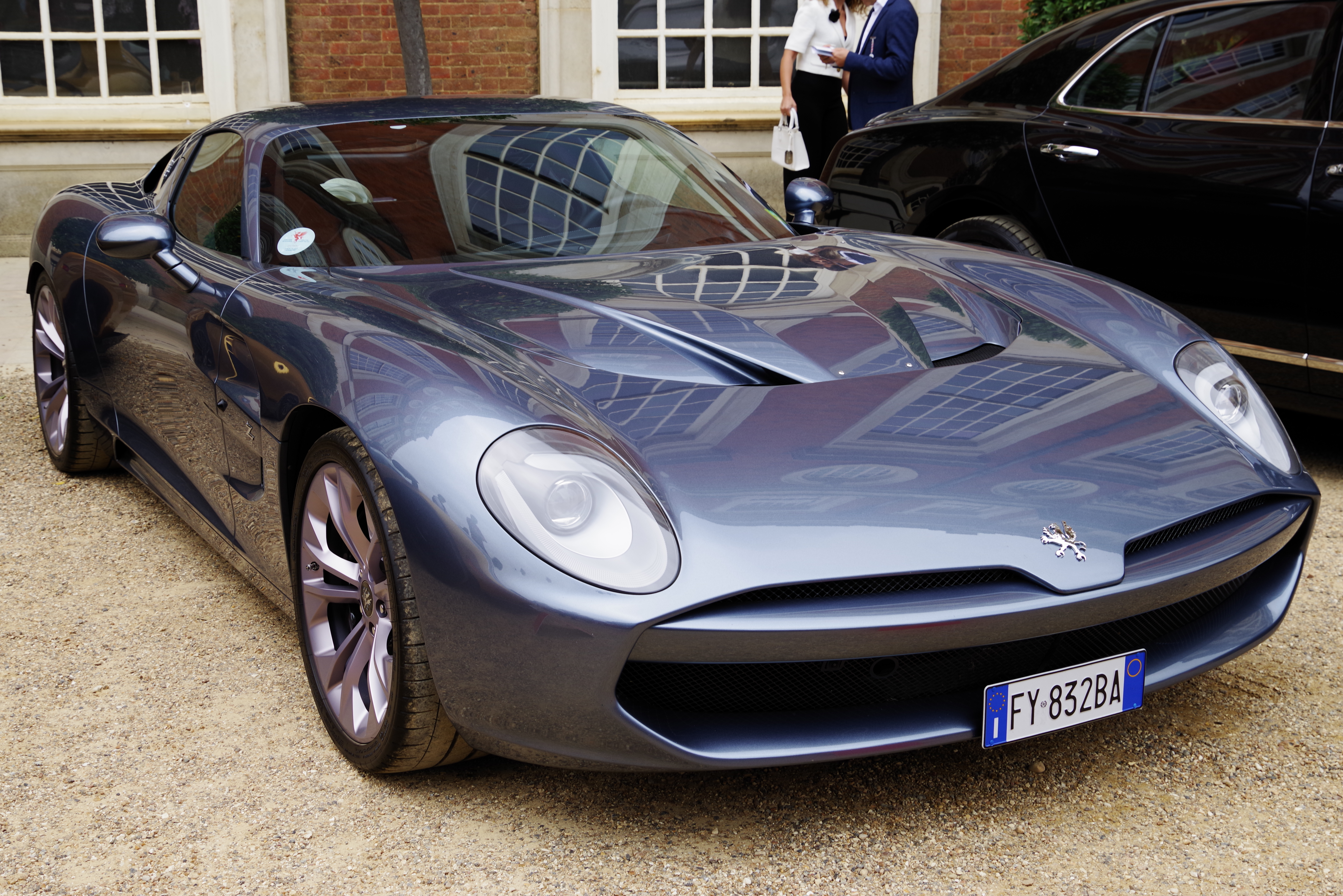
- The GTZ at the 2021 Concours of Elegance, London

Overview
- Manufacturer: Iso Automoveicoli S.p.A., Zagato
- Production: 2021
- Assembly: Italy: Milan
- Designer: Norihiko Harada at Zagato

Body and chassis
- Class: Sports car (S)
- Body style: 2-door coupé
- Layout: Front-mid engine, rear-wheel-drive
- Related: Chevrolet Corvette C7 Z06

Powertrain
- Engine: 6.2L LT4 supercharged V8

The IsoRivolta GTZ is a two-door sports car produced by the Italian automobile manufacturer Iso Rivolta in collaboration with the design studio Zagato. First shown as a concept named the "IsoRivolta Zagato Vision Gran Turismo" in the popular racing game Gran Turismo Sport, an official unveiling was made at the 2021 Concours of Elegance at Hampton Court Palace. The GTZ is inspired by the Iso A3/C, a 1964 24 Hours of Le Mans class winner which, like the GTZ, also was powered by a Chevrolet V8 engine. It is based on the C7 Chevrolet Corvette Z06, using the Corvette's chassis, engine, drivetrain, and interior, with some changes made by Iso Rivolta to differentiate it. Its LT4 V8 produces 660 hp (669 PS; 492 kW) and 881 N⋅m (650 lb⋅ft), with the car being capable of accelerating from 0–62 mph (0–100 km/h) in 3.7 seconds, with a top speed of 315 km/h (196 mph). Production is limited to 19 units, most of which have reportedly already been sold.

== Gallery ==
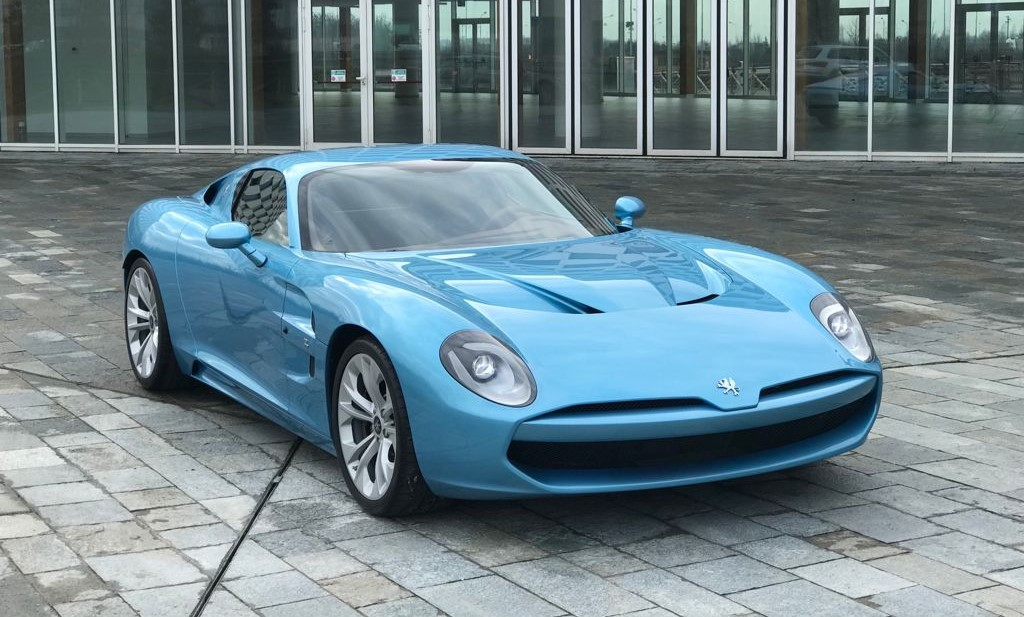
Iso Rivolta GTZ

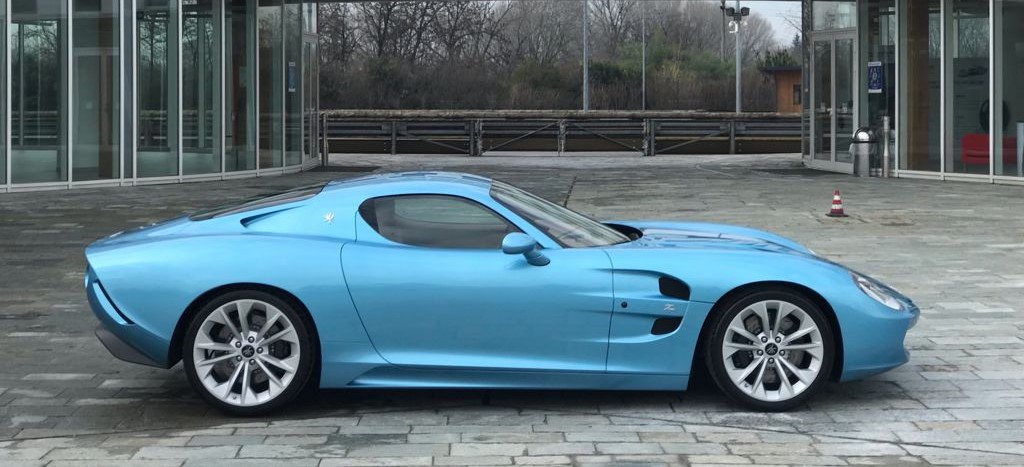
Side view
