= Renzo Rivolta =

Italian engineer (1908–1966)

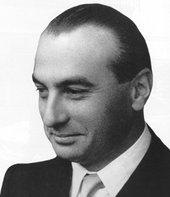
- Born: September 5, 1908; Italy
- Died: August 20, 1966 (aged 57)
- Occupation(s): Engineer, entrepreneur
- Known for: Founder of the Iso Autoveicoli company

Renzo Rivolta (5 September 1908 – 20 August 1966) was an Italian engineer and entrepreneur who founded the Iso vehicle company that produced appliances, scooters and later sports cars.

== Career ==
In 1939 Rivolta founded ‘Isothermos’ a successful manufacturer of refrigeration units. After World War II his company began producing motor scooters and then motorcycles. By 1950, Isothermos was renamed Iso Autoveicoli and was Italy's third largest two-wheel producer, behind Vespa and Lambretta. Rivolta produced home appliances, and Iso scooters, before moving to car production. In 1952 he developed the Isetta microcar (which he described as "half motorcycle and half car") and sold the car in Italy. The car became famous through the licensed production at BMW.

The company later produced sports touring cars starting with the Iso Rivolta IR 300, using Chevrolet 327ci engines and gearboxes. Rivolta used to say "At the wheel of a car I enjoy myself only above 120 mph." Iso entered racing, and won its class at Le Mans in 1965. In the 1960s Rivolta's company produced the Iso Grifo, Bizzarrini, and other sports cars, all using the GM drivetrain. The Bizzarrini is now a much sought after model, having been developed by Giotto Bizzarrini, an ex-Ferrari engineer who designed their GTO models.

== Personal life ==
Rivolta was born in Desio, Italy on 5 September 1908. He had a good education and could speak several languages. He lived in Bresso, a Milan suburb in a mansion that was surrounded by gardens and the companies factories. When Rivolta suddenly died in 1966, his son Dr. Piero Rivolta Barberi, who was only 25 at the time and also a mechanical engineer, took charge of the company.
