= MA-FRA =

Italian chemical company

- Type: Joint-stock company
- Industry: Chemical
- Founded: 1965
- Founders: Gianfranco Mattioli
- Headquarters: Baranzate (Milan)
- Key people: Marco Mattioli (CEO)
- Website: www.mafra.it

MA-FRA is an Italian chemical company specializing in automotive, motorcycle, boat, and industry care and cleaning products and is one of oldest in the industry.

== History ==
MA-FRA was founded in 1965 by Gianfranco Mattioli during the Economic Boom of the 1960s in Bresso, Italy.

The company collaborated with Nelson Piquet in F1 during the 1980s and with Peugeot Rally in the 1990s. Later, MA-FRA became involved in Ferrari Challenge and collaborated closely with the Mille Miglia.

In 2001, MA-FRA's headquarters moved to the plant in Baranzate, which is still the company's headquarters on the outskirts of Milan.

In the 2010-2020 decade, MA-FRA produced the "Ecolabel" line with totally "green" formulations made with natural and biodegradable surfactants.

MA-FRA established the "Detailing School" in 2016 to technically train new professionals dedicated to car detailing. The #Labocosmetica brand was launched in the same year, a line of products specifically for car detailing professionals.

During COVID-19, MA-FRA launched a series of products for car and room sanitization to counter the spread of the pandemic.

In 2022, MA-FRA was represented as a sponsor at numerous automotive events: Autopromotec 2022, the international aftermarket exhibition in Bologna.

The company was announced to participate in the Car Wash Show Europe 2023, the industry's largest event.
