= Iso Grifo =

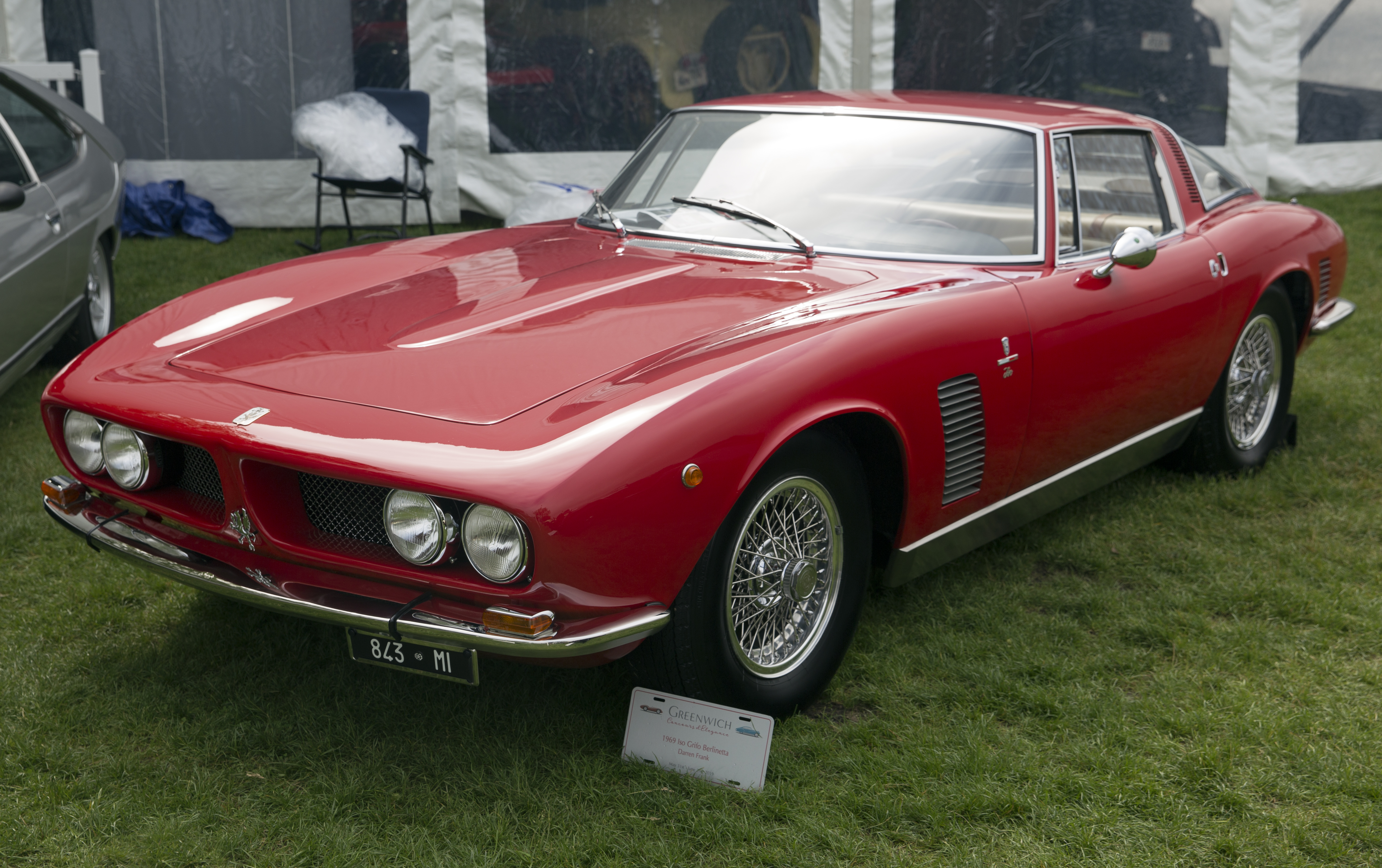

Overview
- Manufacturer: Iso Autoveicoli S.p.A.
- Production: 1965–1974
- Assembly: Italy: Bresso
- Designer: Giorgetto Giugiaro at Bertone

Body and chassis
- Body style: 2-door coupe
- Layout: Front-engine, rear-wheel-drive

Powertrain
- Engine: 5.4 L Chevrolet 327 OHV V8; 5.8 L Ford 351 OHV V8; 7.0 L Chevrolet 427 OHV V8; 7.4 L Chevrolet 454 OHV V8
- Transmission: 4-speed BorgWarner manual; 5-speed ZF manual; 3-speed automatic

Dimensions
- Wheelbase: 2,500 mm (98.4 in)
- Length: 4,430 mm (174.4 in)
- Width: 1,770 mm (69.7 in)
- Height: 1,200 mm (47.2 in)
- Curb weight: 1,430–1,610 kg (3,150–3,550 lb)

1965 A3/C at Goodwood Festival of Speed 2010

The Iso Grifo is a limited production grand tourer manufactured by Italian automobile manufacturer Iso Autoveicoli S.p.A. between 1965 and 1974. Intended to compete with Grand Touring offerings from Ferrari and Maserati, it used a series of American power trains and components supplied by Chevrolet and Ford. Styling was done by Giorgetto Giugiaro at Bertone, while the mechanicals were the work of Giotto Bizzarrini.

The first production GL models appeared in 1965 and were powered by American Chevrolet small-block 327 (5.4-litre) V8 engines fitted to American supplied Borg-Warner 4-speed manual transmissions. The 5.4-litre engine was rated at 300 hp (220 kW) in its standard form and allowed the car to attain a speed of 110 km/h (68 mph) in first gear.

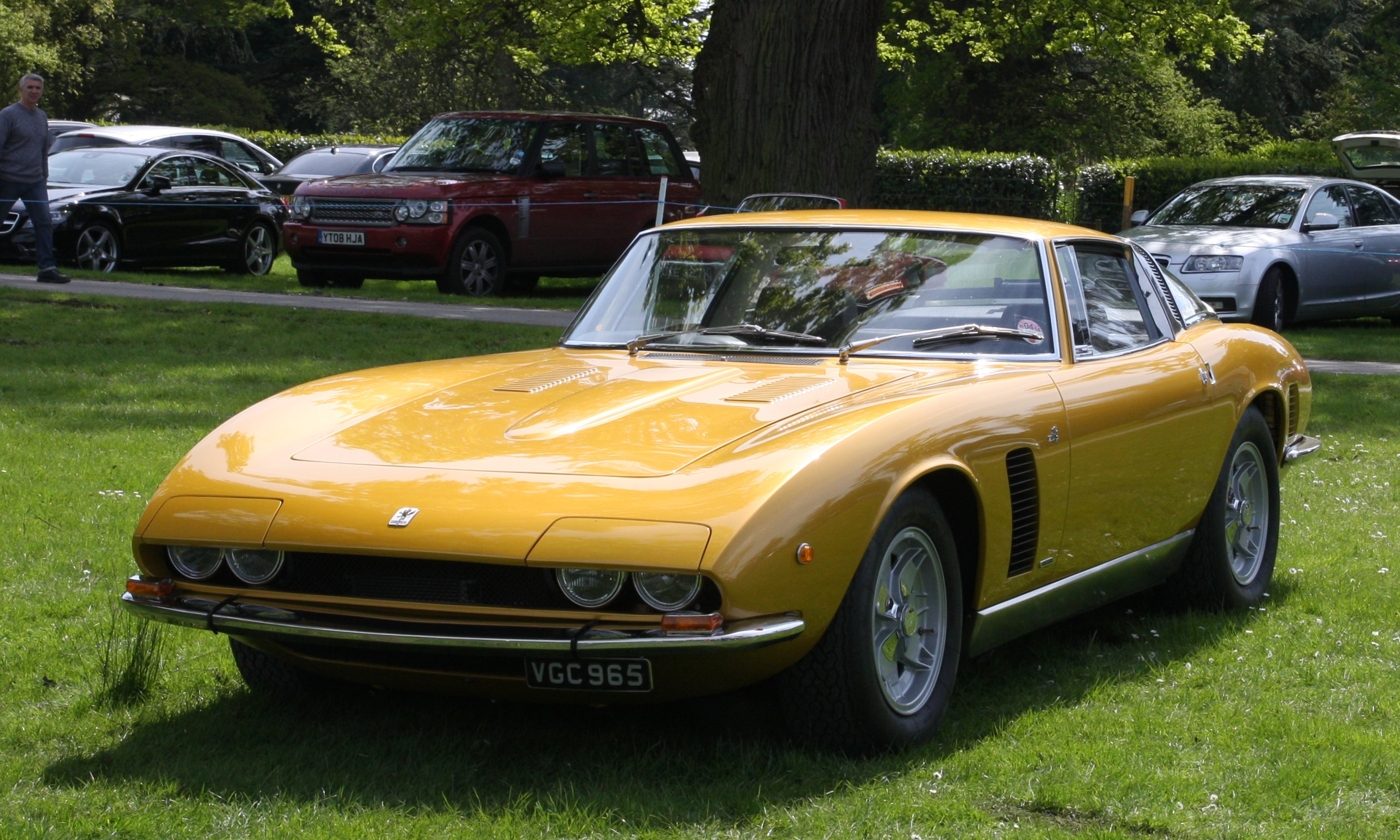
Iso Grifo Series II

In 1970, the Grifo Series II was introduced, with sleeker styling and hide-away headlights and powered by big-block Chevrolet 454 V8 (7.4-litre) engines. It was replaced in 1972 with the Grifo IR-8, which used a small-block Ford Boss 351 engine (5.8-litre) as its power-train. This was the last new Iso of any type, as the manufacturer went bankrupt; it shut down and ceased all operations permanently in 1974. The bankruptcy had a number of causes, perhaps the largest being the 1973 oil crisis, which significantly reduced demand for cars with large displacement engines.

== History ==
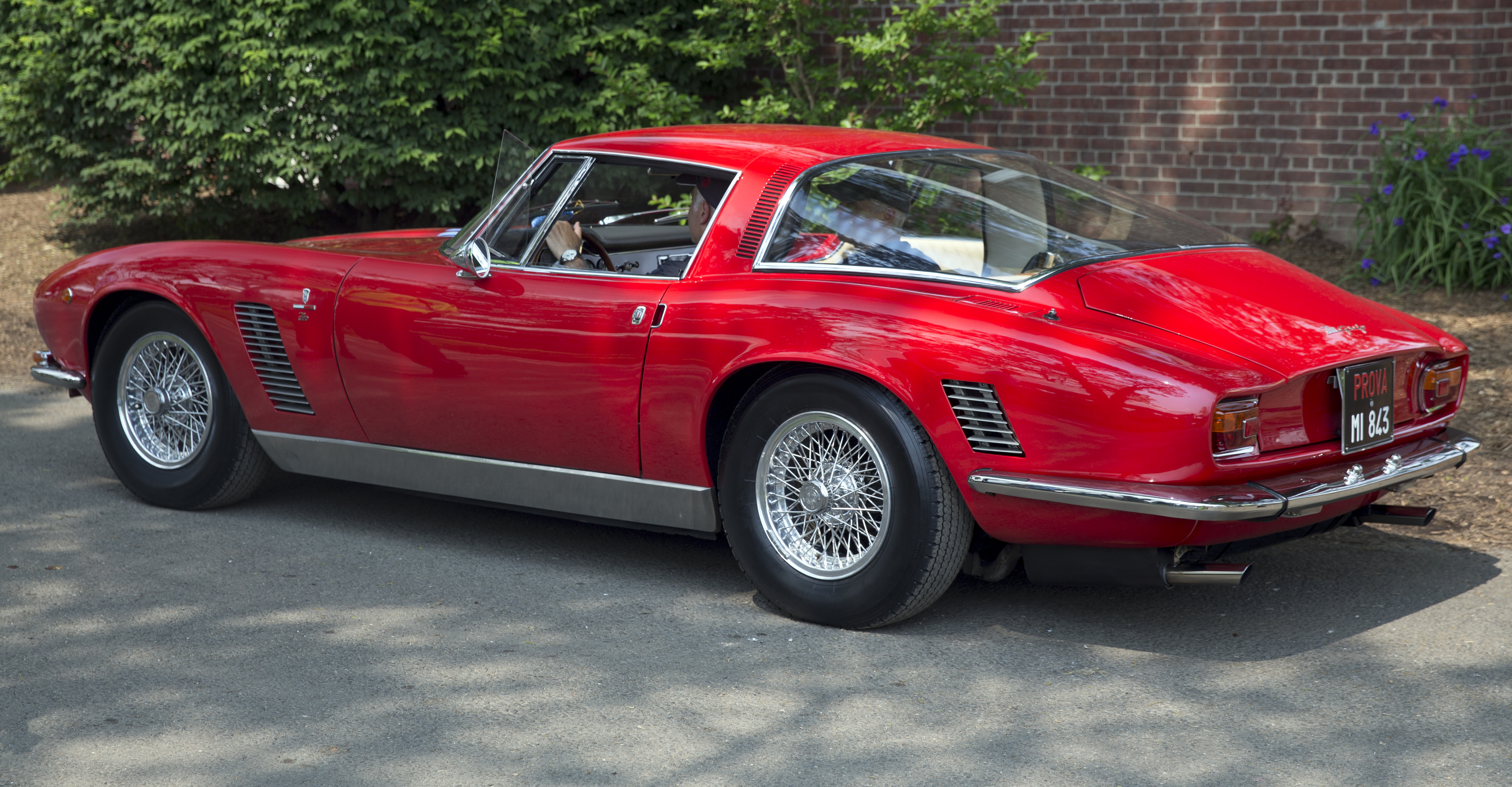
Iso Grifo Series I, rear view

Iso S.p.A. was already well known for producing the high-performance Rivolta IR 300; a sleek looking 2+2 Coupe based on Chevrolet Corvette mechanicals. After leaving Ferrari, in 1961 Giotto Bizzarrini set up “Prototipi Bizzarrini” in Livorno, Tuscany where he designed and consulted for marques such as ATS, Lamborghini, and Iso. In 1963, he designed the Iso Grifo A3/L ("L" for Lusso, Italian for "luxury") for Renzo Rivolta, who was looking for a follow-up to his IR 300. The body was designed by Giorgetto Giugiaro at Bertone, while Bizzarrini put his expertise in the mechanicals.

Bizzarrini figured there would also be a demand for a race version of the Grifo and developed the A3/C (C for Corsa) with a dramatic, modified alloy body. He later dubbed it his “Improved GTO", as he designed the 250 GTO when he had worked for Ferrari. In the Corsa, he moved the engine back about 40 mm (1.6 in), making the A3/C a front, mid-engine car. To adjust the timing, mechanics had to remove a piece of the dashboard. Both the racing and road legal versions of the car were being built simultaneously. When leaving the factory, the Iso Grifo was originally fitted with Pirelli Cinturato 205VR15 tyres (CN72).

At the Turin Motor Show that same year, Bertone showed the Grifo A3/L prototype while Iso unveiled the unpainted competition version: the Iso Grifo A3/C. Both became successful in their own right, the road car receiving praise from the press, while the race car performed very well although it had been made on a much tighter budget compared to Ferrari. Rivolta also showed a prototype A3/L Spyder at the Geneva Motor Show.

== Grifo GL – Bizzarrini A3/C split ==
Iso concentrated on getting the A3/L ready for production, focusing on some of the design changes that had to be made to the prototype. The car got a light face-lift that made it less aggressive in appearance. It was given a modified but reliable 5.4 litre Chevrolet small-block 327 V8 engine—having variable power outputs of 300–350 horsepower (220–260 kW)—coupled to a Borg-Warner 4-speed manual transmission. The engines were completely ordered and manufactured in the United States; they were shipped to Italy, where they were taken apart before they were eventually installed in the cars. This was similar to the manufacturing process of the IR 300. With a weight of less than 2,200 lb (1,000 kg), the car was able to attain a top speed of over 275 km/h (171 mph).

In 1964, the prototype A3/C raced at Le Mans (driven by Edgar Berney and Pierre Noblet), running well until brake problems required a two-hour pit stop. The car resumed the race, finally finishing 14th. In 1965, the car performed better, finishing 9th at Le Mans.

The production of the Iso Grifo GL started in 1965, but the Bizzarrini and Rivolta partnership quickly fell apart over the use of the name Grifo. This resulted in separate production of the Grifo GL and the competition Bizzarrini A3/C. The Grifo GL was produced at Bresso, while the A3/C was produced at Piero Drogo's Sports Cars of Modena, under Bizzarrini's strict supervision. Bizzarrini refined his A3/C, eventually developing his line of models. Only 22 examples of the Grifo A3/C were made before Rivolta and Bizzarrini split.

== Model year changes ==
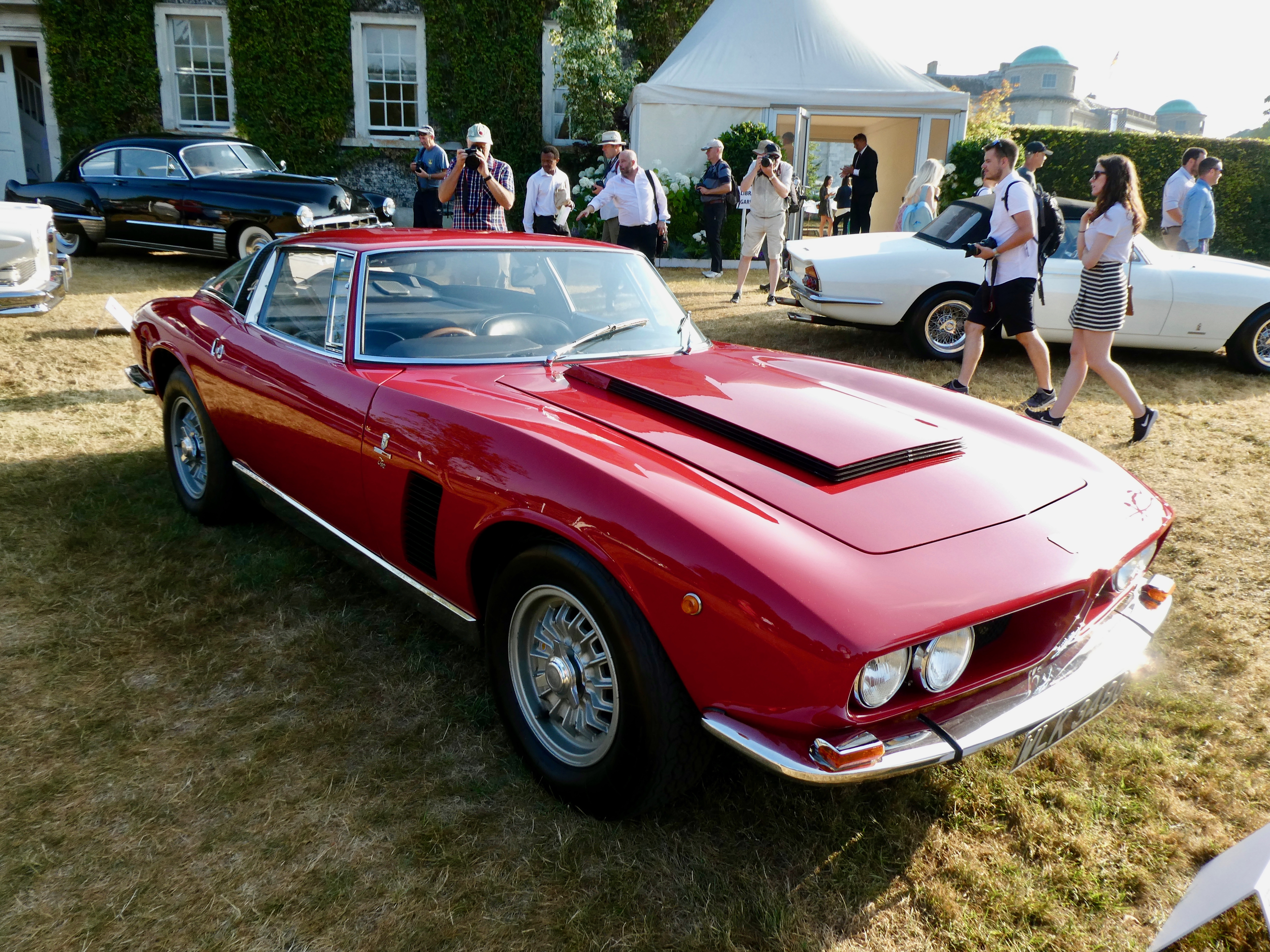
Iso Grifo Can Am Series I

In October 1966, the first Grifo (car #97) with a targa top was shown at the Turin Motor Show. Designed by Bertone and featuring the stunning removable roof, the reliable 300 hp Chevy 327 V8, and the coveted ZF 5 speed transmission. Only fourteen Series I Targas and four series II Targas were built.

In 1968 the Grifo 7 Litri was introduced, featuring a Chevrolet L71 big-block engine, a Tri-Power version of the 427 engine. The massive power plant required several mechanical changes to the car in order to fit, i.e. strengthened chassis components as well as an enlarged engine compartment with reinforced mounts. A large hood scoop (dubbed "Penthouse" due to its size) was added to clear for the engine's deck height. It produced an officially advertised minimum of 435 hp (324 kW) at 5,800 rpm. The factory claimed the 7 Litri could attain a top speed of 300 km/h (186 mph).

In 1970, a styling change was made to the nose section of the car for the Grifo Series II. It was given a sleeker look and hide-away headlights. In the IR-9 "Can Am" version, the engine was switched from the 427 engines to the newer, even more powerful Chevrolet 454 7.4 litre engine.

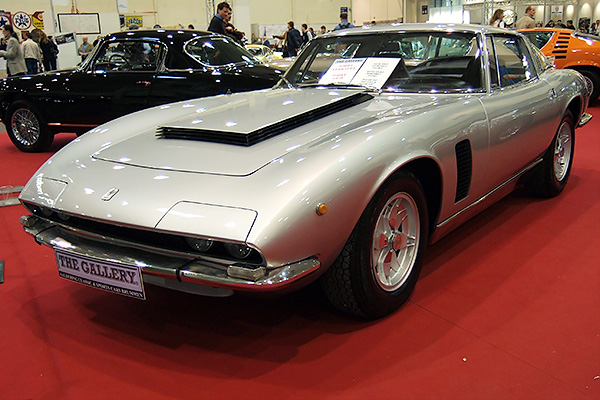
Iso Grifo Can Am with the characteristic 7-litre engine "penthouse" on the hood and Grifo Series II hide-away headlights

In 1972, the Grifo IR-8 was introduced, using a small-block Ford Boss 351 engines. These models can be recognized by their taller hood scoop. This was the final Iso automobile made, as Iso S.P.A. closed its doors in 1974 during the 1970s oil crisis.

== Production ==
In total, 330 Series I and 83 Series II cars were built for a total of 413 cars, 90 of which were 7-litre versions. The rarest are the Series II 5-speeds (23 built) and the Series II Targa (4 built). Due to their rarity today, Grifos are desirable collectibles. A former employee of Iso, Roberto Negri, runs a small company in Clusone, Italy, specializing in maintaining and restoring Grifos.

== See also ==
- Bizzarrini Strada
- Ferrari 250 GTO
- De Tomaso Mangusta
- Ferrari Daytona
- Lamborghini Miura
- Maserati Ghibli

== Sources ==
- Automobil Revue, catalog numbers 1963 through 1974
- Winston Goodfellow: Iso Rivolta, The Man, The Machines. Motorbooks International 2001. ISBN 88-7911-268-6.
- Buckley, Martin; Rees, Chris (1998). The World Encyclopedia of Cars. Hermes House. pp. 154–155. ISBN 978-1-84038-083-5.
