= Iso Rivolta IR 300 =

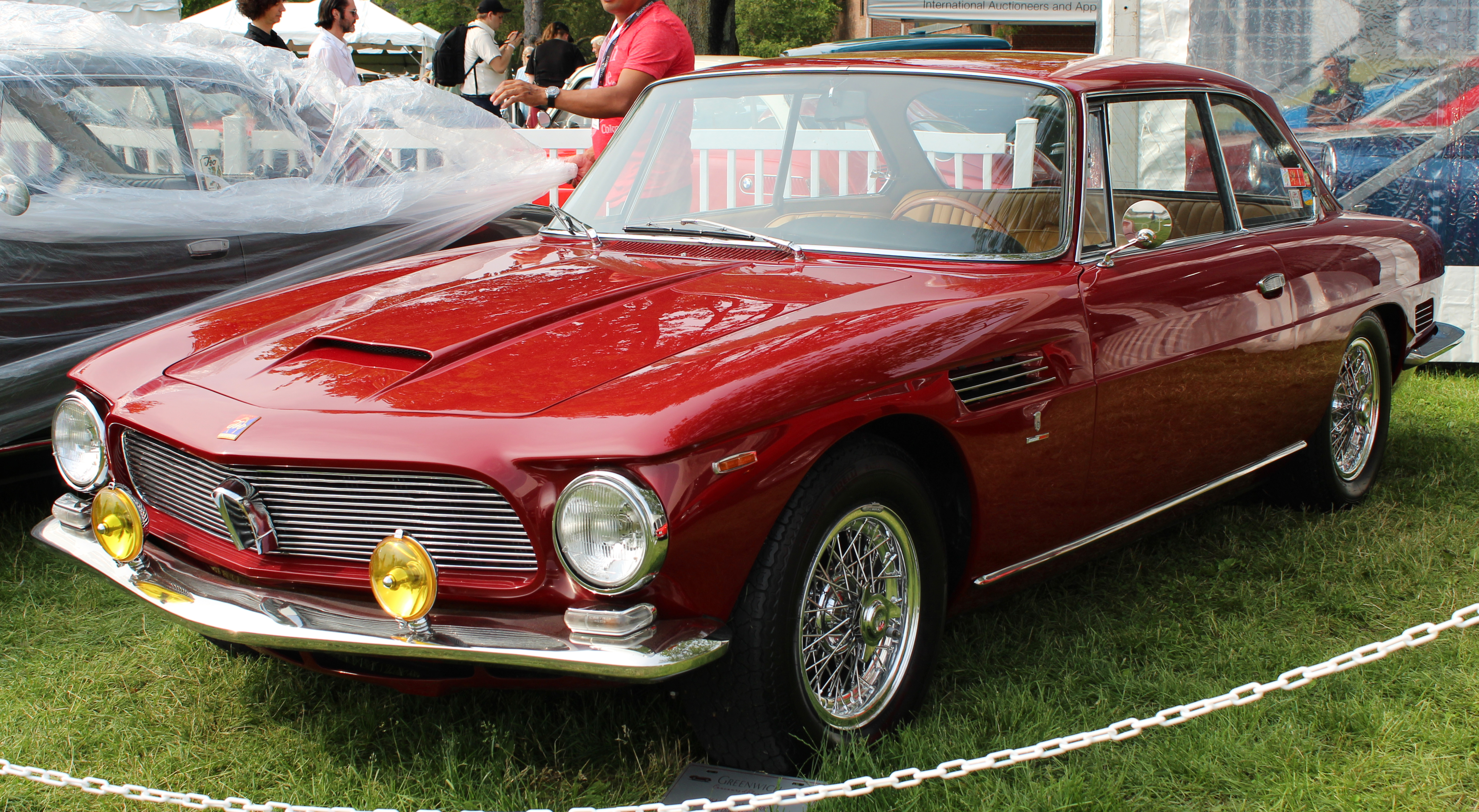

Overview
- Manufacturer: Iso Automoveicoli S.p.A.
- Production: 1962–1970
- Assembly: Italy: Bresso
- Designer: Giorgetto Giugiaro at Bertone

Body and chassis
- Class: Grand tourer (S)
- Body style: 2-door 2+2 coupé
- Layout: Front-engine, rear-wheel-drive

Powertrain
- Engine: 5,350 cc (5.4 L) Chevrolet 327 V8
- Transmission: 4-speed BorgWarner manual; 5-speed manual; 3-speed automatic

Dimensions
- Wheelbase: 2,700 mm (106.3 in)
- Length: 4,760 mm (187.4 in)
- Width: 1,752 mm (69.0 in)
- Height: 1,425 mm (56.1 in)
- Curb weight: 1,590 kg (3,505 lb)

Chronology
- Successor: Iso Lele

The Iso Rivolta is a grand tourer introduced in 1962 by Italian automobile manufacturer Iso Automotoveicoli S.p.A. Company chairman Renzo Rivolta and his colleague, former Ferrari engineer Giotto Bizzarrini, saw it as a gran turismo in the original sense of the term, designed for long journeys. It was the first luxury automobile introduced by the company which formerly specialised in affordable motor vehicles. For motor racing, an entirely different variant was made, which bore a strong resemblance to the 1962 Ferrari 250 GT SWB Breadvan, and was homologated as a touring car.

== History ==
Iso, a well known manufacturer of motorcycles and micro cars, especially the Isetta bubble car, decided to enter the lucrative luxury car market in the early 60s. The idea behind this was a car that was usable every day while being priced between a Jaguar and a Ferrari. For the mechanical development of the car, the company founder and chairman entrusted Giotto Bizzarrini of Società Autostar. Bizzarrini developed a pressed steel and welded panel chassis which was designed to flex fore and aft and proved to be rigid along with cost effective to manufacture. The de Dion rear suspension and four-wheel disc brakes would be shared with contemporary luxury offerings at the time. While the front suspension would consist of unequal length wishbones. The body style was the work of a young Giorgetto Giugiaro, who was working at Bertone at the time.

For the drivetrain, Iso would follow the same concept as adopted by De Tomaso and would choose an American built drivetrain. The car would be fitted with a Chevrolet 327 V8 engine mated initially to a 4-speed manual transmission from BorgWarner. It would be offered with a 5-speed manual transmission and a 3-speed automatic transmission as well later on in its production life cycle. The IR 300 would be joined by a high performance IR 340 variant in 1964.

The new car named the Rivolta IR 300 was presented to the public at the 1962 Torino Motor Show to a positive reception. 797 units of the IR 300 would be made before production would end in 1970 amid slow sales. 167 cars made were the IR 340 models.

== Specifications ==
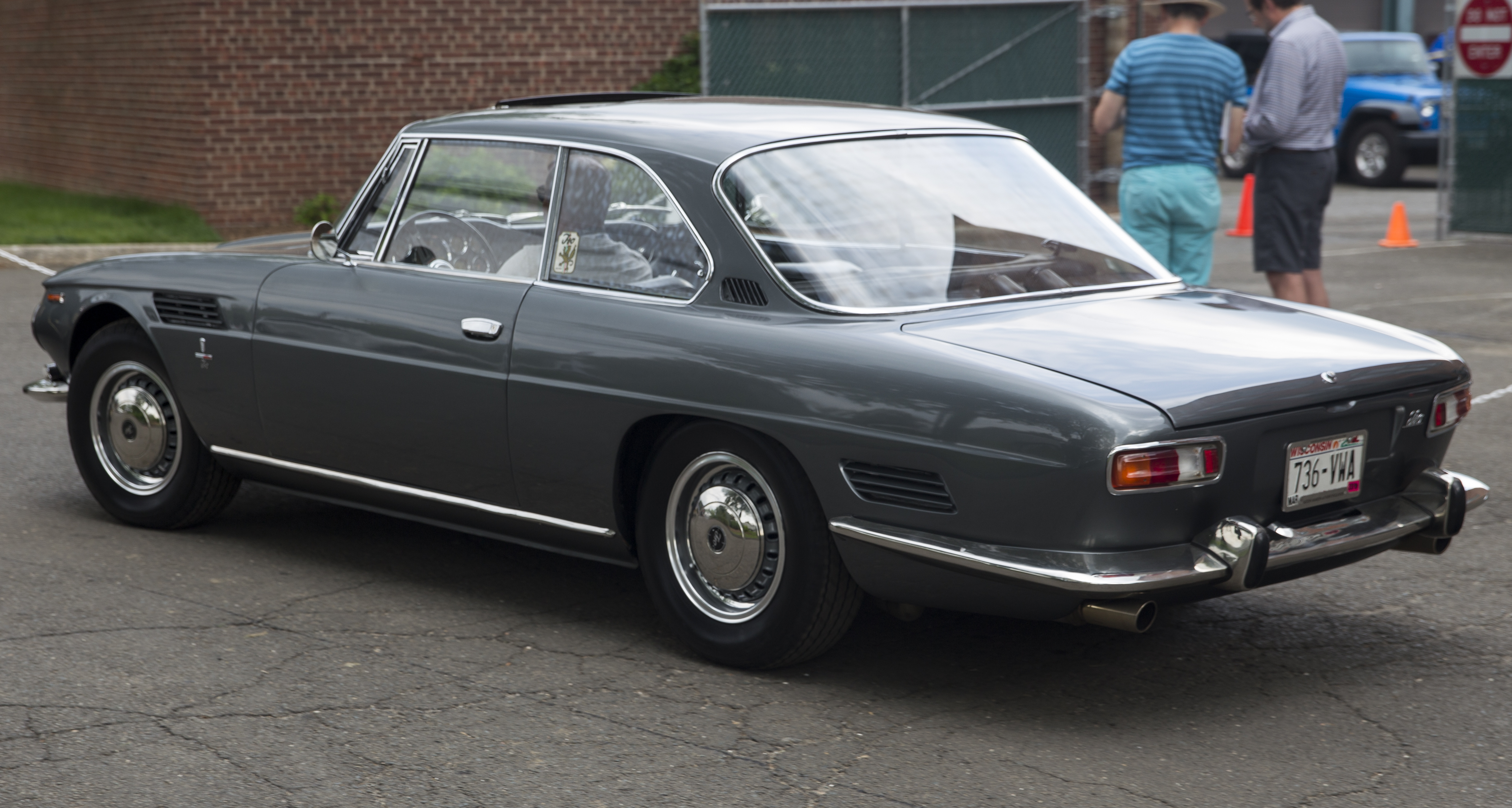
1964 Iso Rivolta IR 300.

The manufacturer wanted the car to be known for its powerful engine, high quality of construction and elegant style. Expensive press-tool dies were produced, but volumes never justified the investment in presses to go with them, and for several years the dies were kept at the factory and periodically sent out to be fitted to a subcontracted press in the area in order that a batch of body panels could be produced.

=== Engine and running gear ===
The engine used was a 5.4 litre Chevrolet small block engine, similar to one of the units installed in the Chevrolet Corvette. It had a compression ratio of 10.5:1 and was rated at 300 hp (224 kW). Power would be increased to 340 hp (254 kW) with an 11.5:1 compression ratio in the high performance IR 340 model. The all-synchromesh 4-speed gearbox came from BorgWarner and was operated with a central floor mounted stick shift. A 3-speed automatic transmission along with a 5-speed manual transmission were also offered.

=== Chassis ===
The front wheels of the Iso Rivolta 300 are suspended by linkages of uneven length with a sway bar. The rear wheels are attached with twin trailing arms using a De Dion axle located by parallel radius arms with a transverse Watt's linkage along with a Salisbury limited slip differential. Coil springs and telescopic hydraulic shock absorbers are fitted to all four wheels. The Dunlop brakes are servo assisted and are fitted to all four wheels inboard.

=== Interior & exterior ===
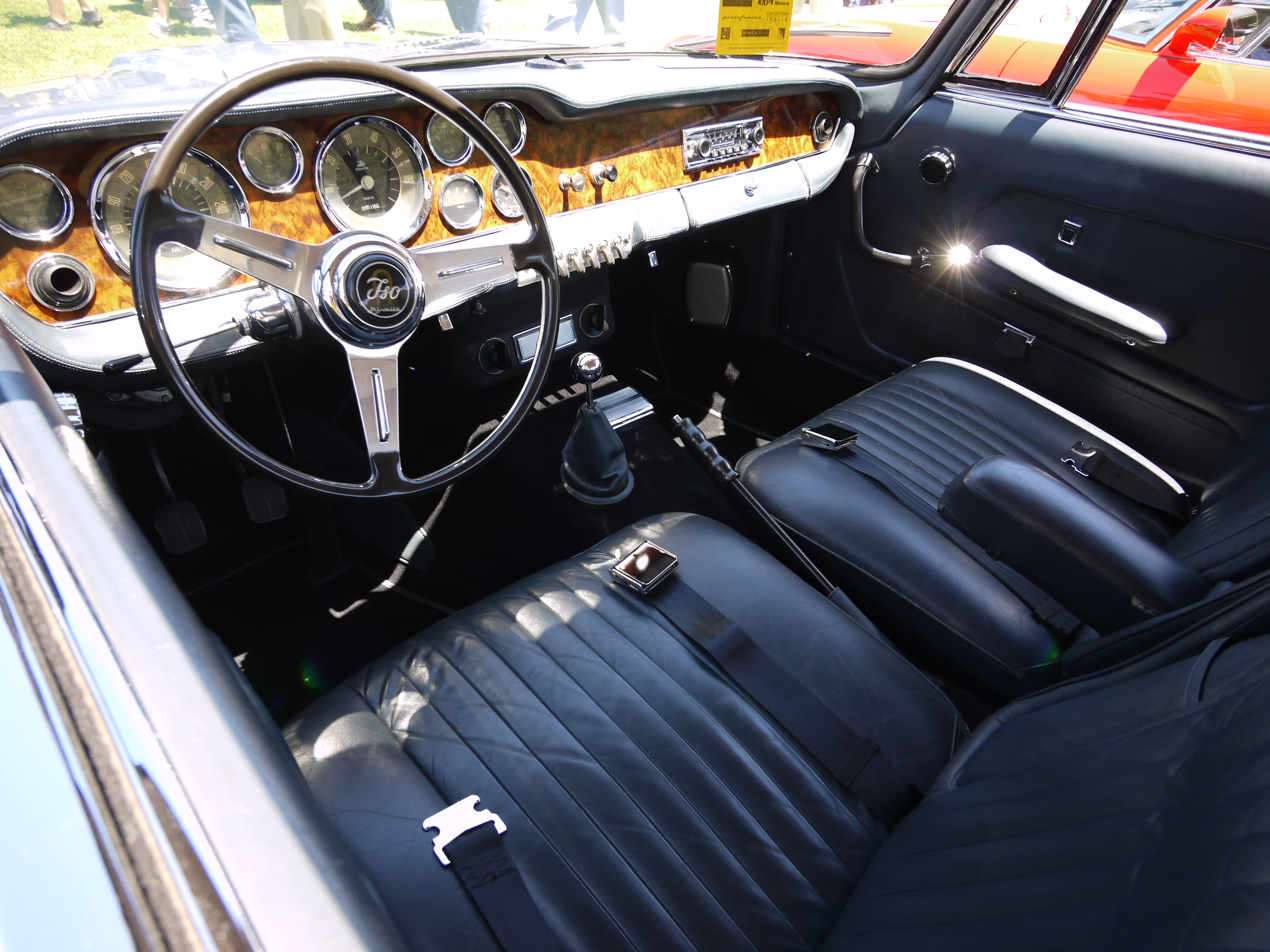
Interior

The Bertone designed coupé has a wheelbase of 270 cm, which enables five people to sit in comfort. As an option, the interior was equipped with leather seats.

== Technical data ==
	300	340
Engine	Four stroke V8 (90°)	
Cylinder capacity	5,350 cc (326 cu in)	
Bore × Stroke	101.6 mm × 82.55 mm (4.00 in × 3.25 in)	
Power	220 kW (295 hp) at 5,000 rpm	250 kW (335 hp) at 6,000 rpm
Torque	488 N⋅m (360 lbf⋅ft) at 3,200 rpm	465 N⋅m (343 lbf⋅ft) at 4,000 rpm
Compression ratio	10.5:1	11.25:1
Valve control	OHV	
Engine cooling	Water cooling with pump and thermostat. Cooler capacity of 18 liters	
Transmission	Four-speed transmission with floor shift, Rear wheel drive, limited slip differential	
Brakes	Hydraulic Servo-foot brake, Disc brakes front and rear (rear discs mounted on the differential), mechanical handbrake on rear wheels	
Suspension front	Double wishbone with stabilizer bar, coil springs	
Suspension rear	De-Dion axle with Watts link and double trailing links, coil springs	
Body	Mid Superior all-steel body on welded steel frame, two-door	
Track front / rear	1,410 mm (55.5 in) / 1,410 mm (55.5 in)	
Wheelbase	2,700 mm (106.3 in)	
Tires	185 HS 15	
Dimensions (L × W × H)	4,760 mm × 1,752 mm × 1,425 mm (187.4 in × 69.0 in × 56.1 in)	
Weight empty (without driver)	1,590 kg (3,505 lb)	
Maximum loaded weight	1,840 kg (4,057 lb)	
Acceleration (0–100 km/h (0–62 mph))	8.4 s	7.9 s
Top speed	218 km/h (135 mph)	228 km/h (142 mph)

Note: Technical data vary between the sources.

== Sources ==
- Etienne Cornil Fuhr: Iso Rivolta. In: Motor Revue. Vereinigte Motorverlage, Heft 50, Sommerausgabe 1964, S. 42–45.
- Katalog 100 Sportwagen, Band 13, 11. Auflage. Gildeverlag, Alfeld 1964
