= IsoRivolta Zagato Vision Gran Turismo =

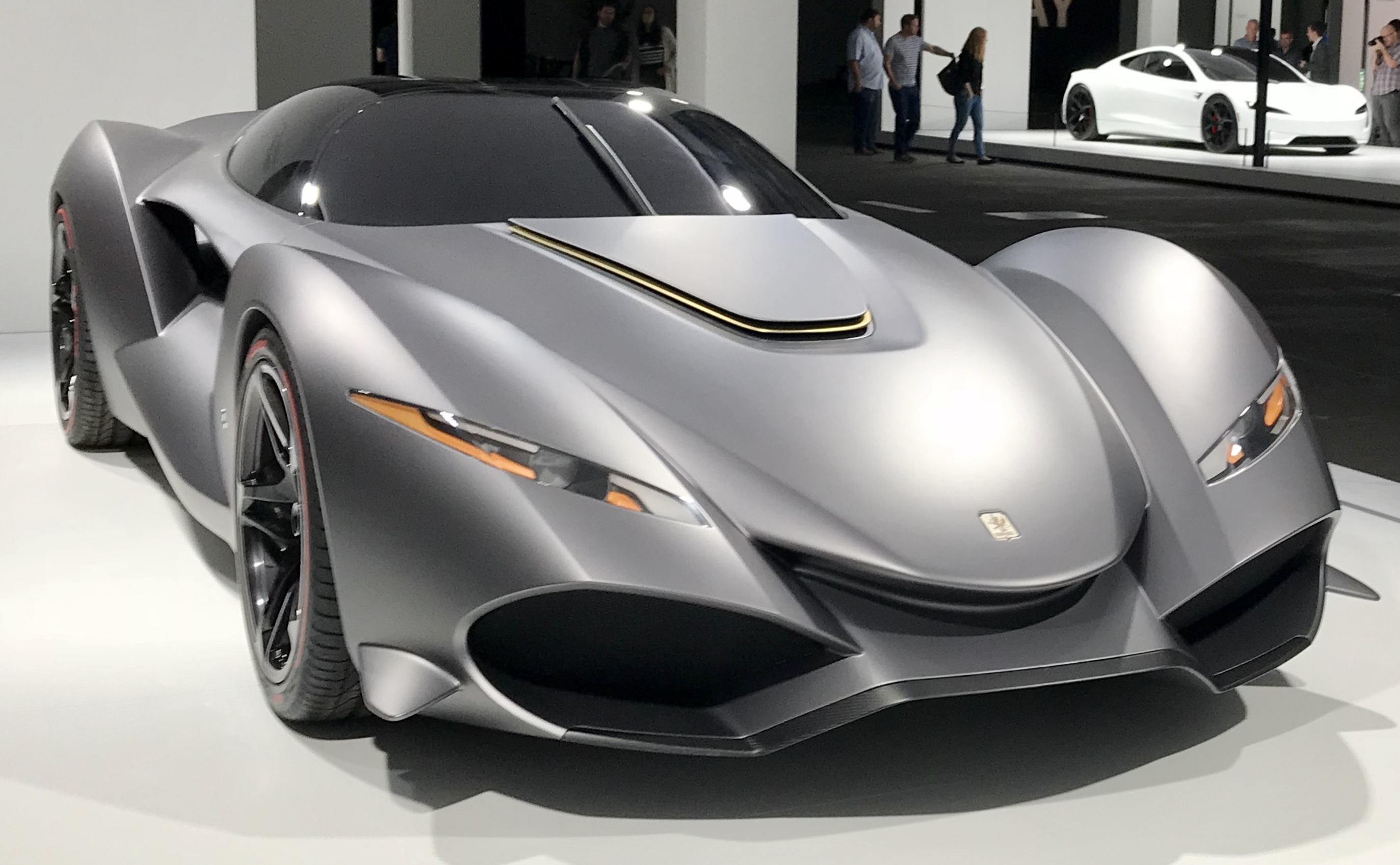

Overview
- Manufacturer: IsoRivolta
- Model years: 2017
- Designer: Norihiko Harada at Zagato

Body and chassis
- Class: Sports car
- Body style: 2-door coupé
- Layout: FR layout

Powertrain
- Engine: Callaway 6.2 liter V8

The IsoRivolta Zagato Vision Gran Turismo is a concept car that was introduced in October 2017 at the Gran Turismo booth during the 45th Tokyo Motor Show. It is part of the Vision Gran Turismo series of concept cars and is inspired by the Iso Rivolta, a coupe produced by Iso from 1962 to 1970. It is designed by Italian coachbuilder Zagato and uses a 6.2-liter V8 from Callaway. The original car from the 1960s also used an American powertrain: a Chevrolet V8 engine. Zagato was open to start producing the car in very limited numbers and had reportedly opened a short list for potential buyers.

== Gallery ==
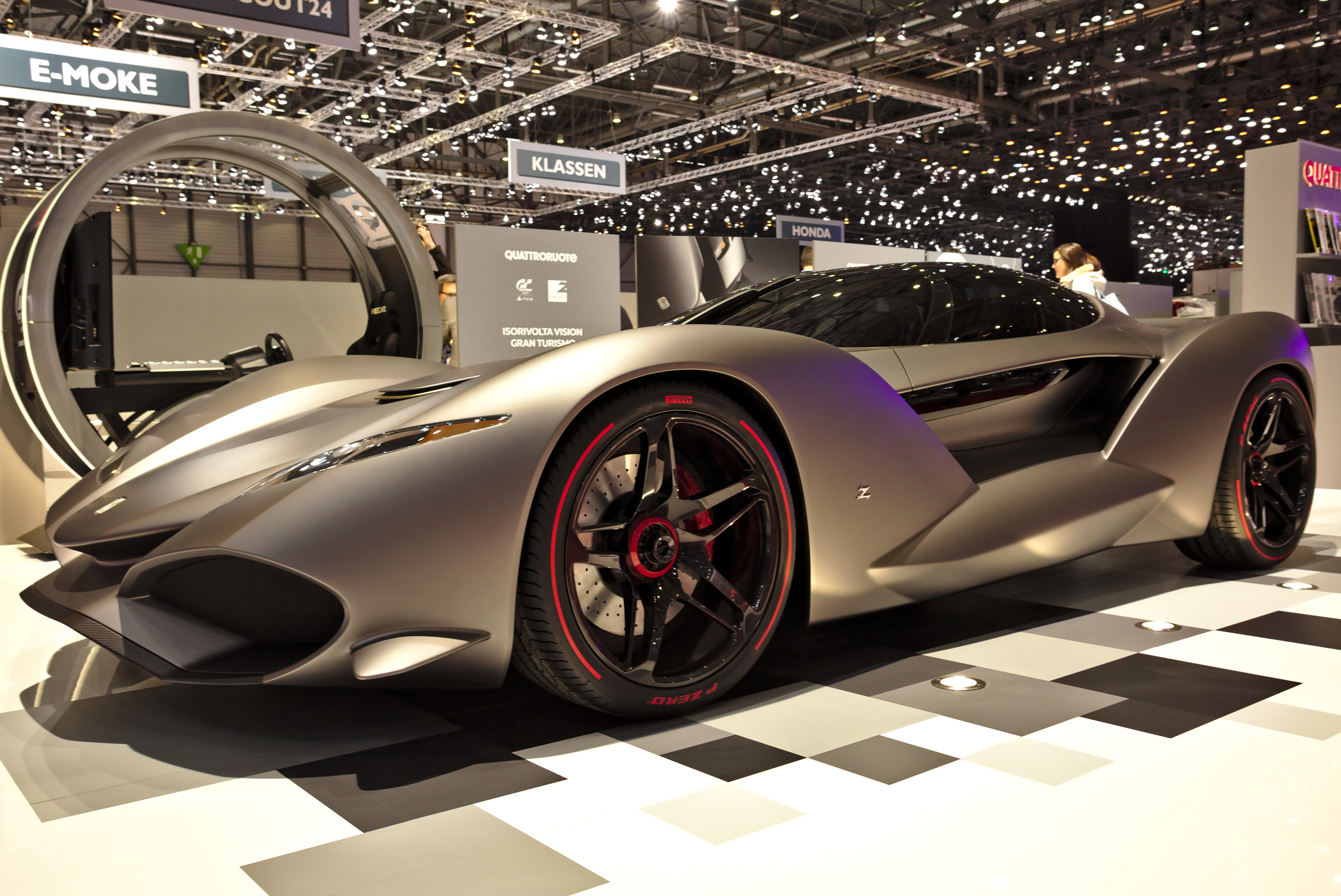
Front ¾ view

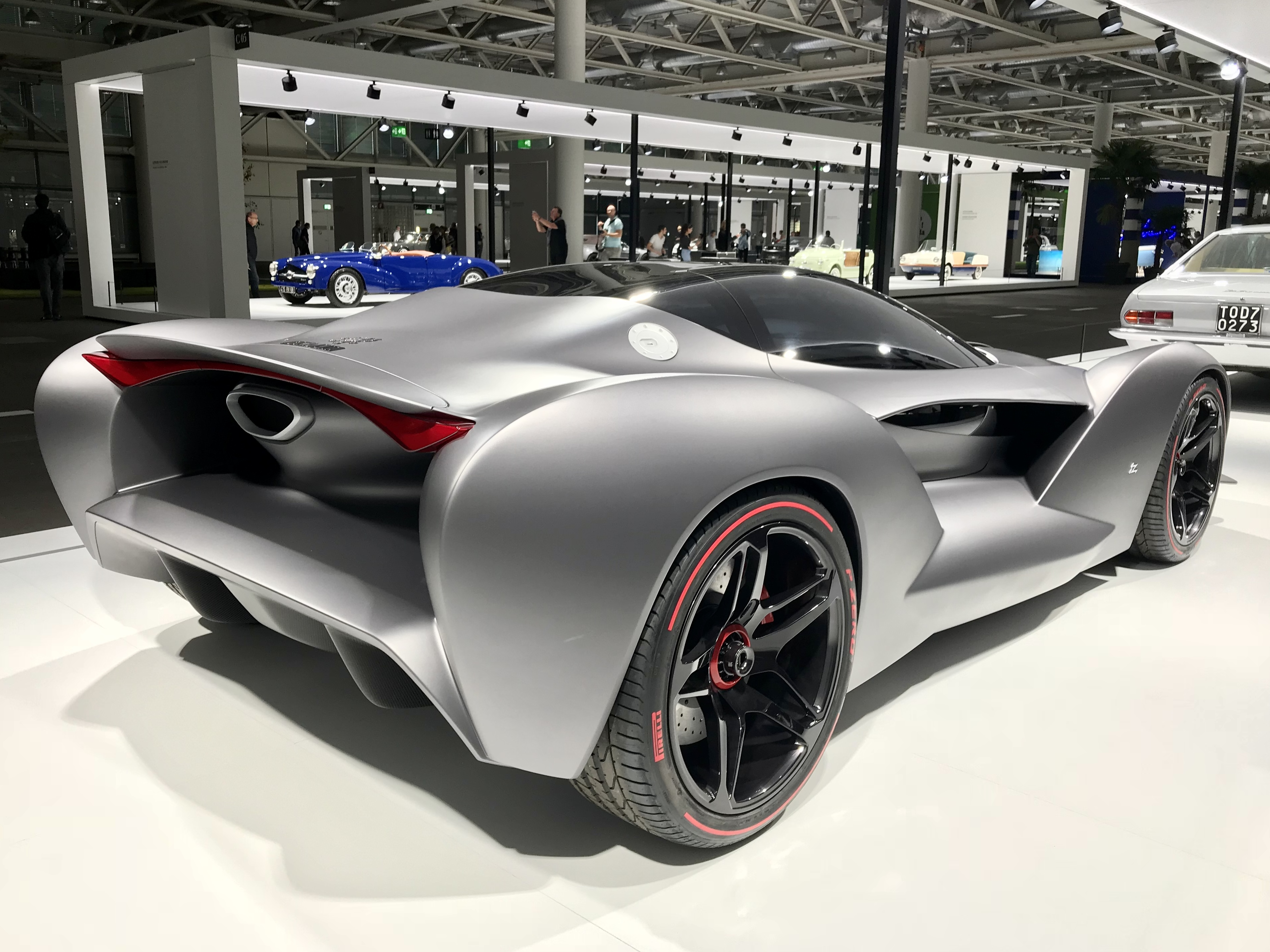
Rear ¾ view
