= Iso Fidia =

Iso Fidia (Iso S4)
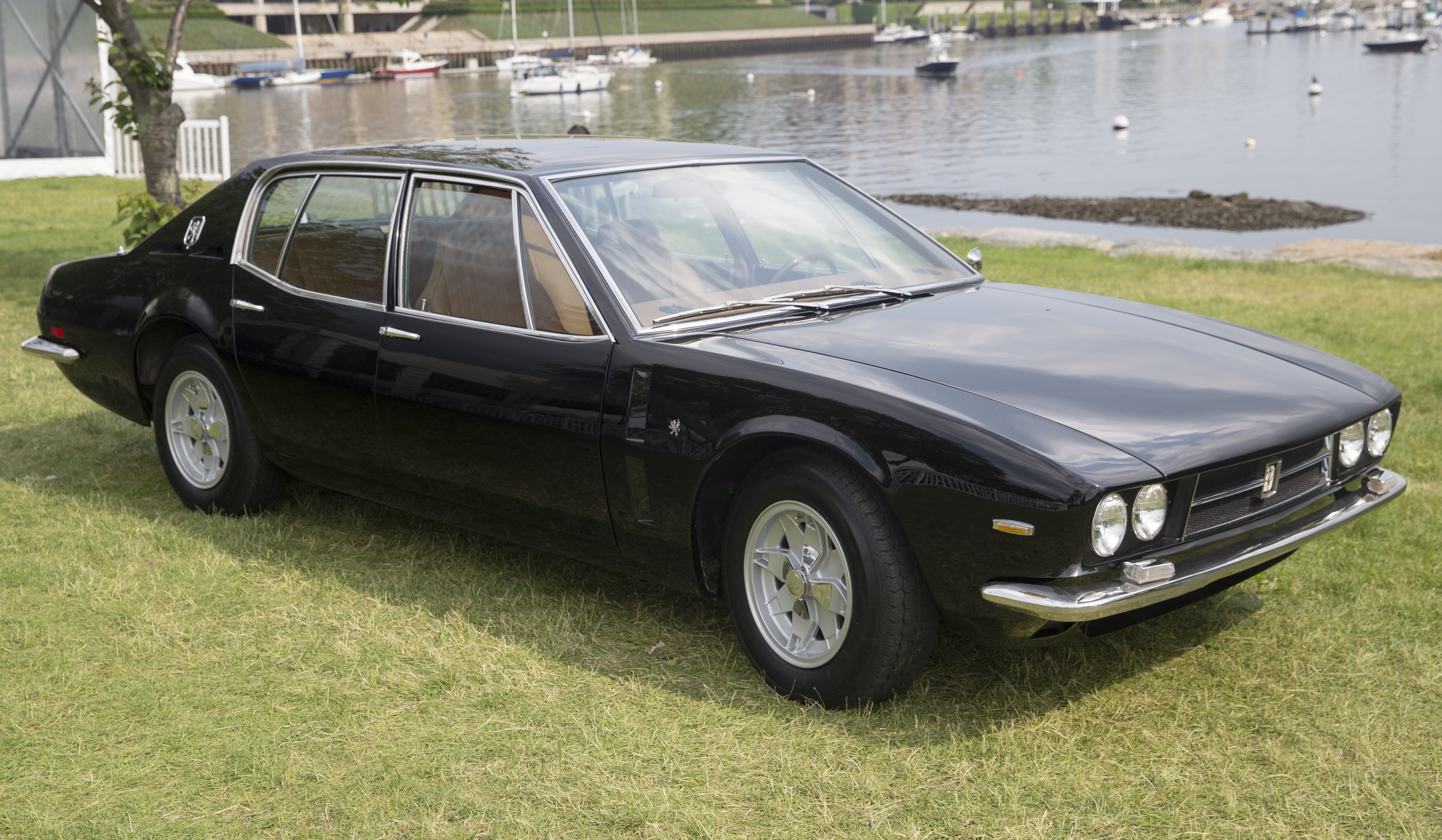

Overview
- Manufacturer: Iso Automoveicoli S.p.A.
- Production: 1967-1975; 192 produced
- Designer: Giorgetto Giugiaro (then at Ghia)

Body and chassis
- Body style: 4-door sedan
- Layout: FR layout

Powertrain
- Engine: 5354 cc V8 Chevrolet 327 (1967-1973); 5769 cc V8 Ford Cleveland (1973-1975)
- Transmission: ZF 5-speed manual Ford "Cruise-O-Matic"

Dimensions
- Wheelbase: 2,850 mm (112.2 in)
- Length: 4,980 mm (196.1 in)
- Width: 1,780 mm (70.1 in)
- Height: 1,320 mm (52.0 in)
- Curb weight: 1,580 kg (3,483 lb)

The Iso Fidia (or Iso Rivolta Fidia), initially Iso Rivolta S4, is a four-door sedan which was produced by the Italian automobile maker Iso Automoveicoli S.p.A. from 1967 to 1975. The Fidia, first presented at the Frankfurt Motor Show in September 1967, was the only four-door model from Iso. Production only got underway some time after the initial presentation of the car, and its European press launch which took place in Athens, came more than a year later, in February 1969. At the time of the press launch 15 cars had already been built, but it was only in February 1969 that the car swapped its "S4" name for the more euphonious "Fidia". The car was marketed as a unique combination of comfort and sporting performance, and the slogan that appeared in sales material was "Le quattro poltrone piu veloci del mondo" ("the four fastest seats in the world").

The choice of Athens for the press launch was connected to the car's new name, Fidia, which was the name (commonly spelled "Phidias" by anglophone classicists) of the artist who some 24 centuries earlier had supervised creation of the friezes which originally decorated the Parthenon. In some ways, Athens was not a good choice for a press launch: locally available fuel was of too low an octane for the (single) car made available to journalists and the brief test drive round the city suburbs was characterized by "horrible pinking".

The body design was the work of Giorgetto Giugiaro (then at Ghia). The interior featured polished wood and hand-stitched leather. High development costs drove the purchase price higher than that of a Rolls-Royce. The Fidia's main competitors were other contemporary luxurious and sporty sedans like the Maserati Quattroporte. The second Fidia made (and the first with right hand drive) was purchased by English rockstar John Lennon: the car had celebrity appeal.

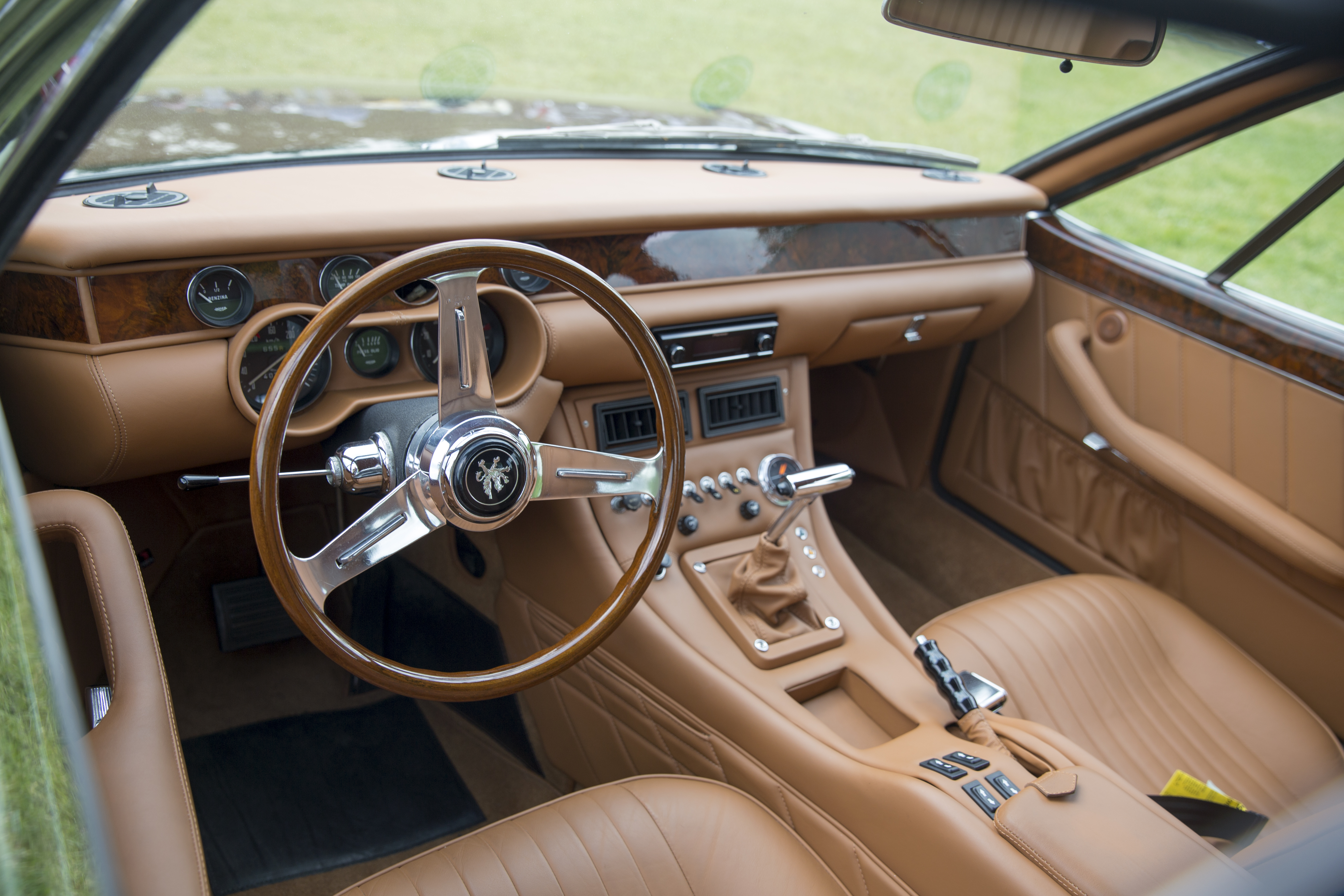
The updated dashboard which was presented in 1971

In 1971 the car received a new interior, which essentially brought it into line with the Iso Lele. The wooden dashboard was replaced by a leather one, which commentators found more elegant but also less practical. The instruments now appeared more randomly scattered than on the earlier cars, and were partially obscured by the Nardi steering wheel.

The Fidia, like other Iso cars, was originally powered by a Chevrolet V8 engine, with a choice between a version producing 300 bhp (224 kW; 304 PS) and a version producing 350 bhp (261 kW; 355 PS), the latter giving the car a top speed of 144 mph (232 km/h), giving it the title of fastest four-door at the time of its debut. 0-60 mph takes around 8 seconds. By 1973, after General Motors demanded payment in advance of shipment, the engine supplier had been switched and cars were delivered with a Ford 5.8 litre V8, matched with a ZF five speed manual gear box or with Ford's own 'Cruise-O-Matic' automatic gearbox.

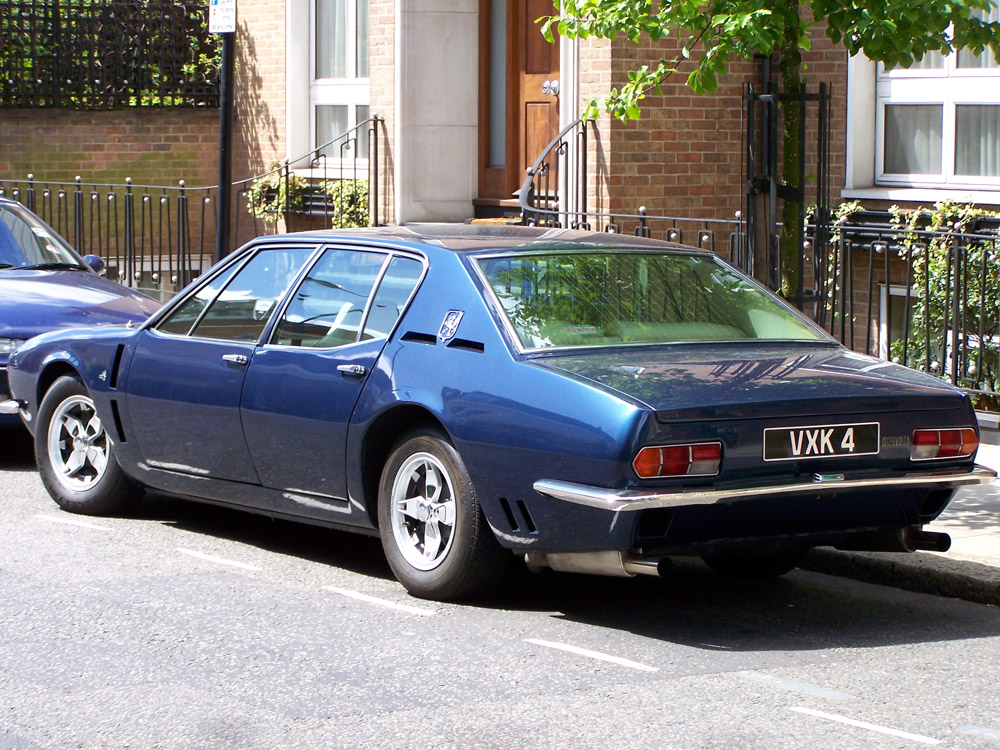
1973 Iso Fidia (Ford-engined)

In the rarefied market segment that it occupied, the car tended to find itself overshadowed by the Maserati Quattroporte, itself never a mass seller. Until Maserati in effect retreated from the market in response the economic shock that saw massive oil price increases, the Fidia was comfortably outsold by its Modenese competitor. In 1971 Iso produced just 15 Fidias, which rose to 21 in 1972 and slid to 20 in 1973. In total, there were 192 Fidias built. However, between 1969 and 1975 only two Quattroportes were built.
