= Bresso =

Bresso Bress (Lombard)
- Comune
- Comune di Bresso
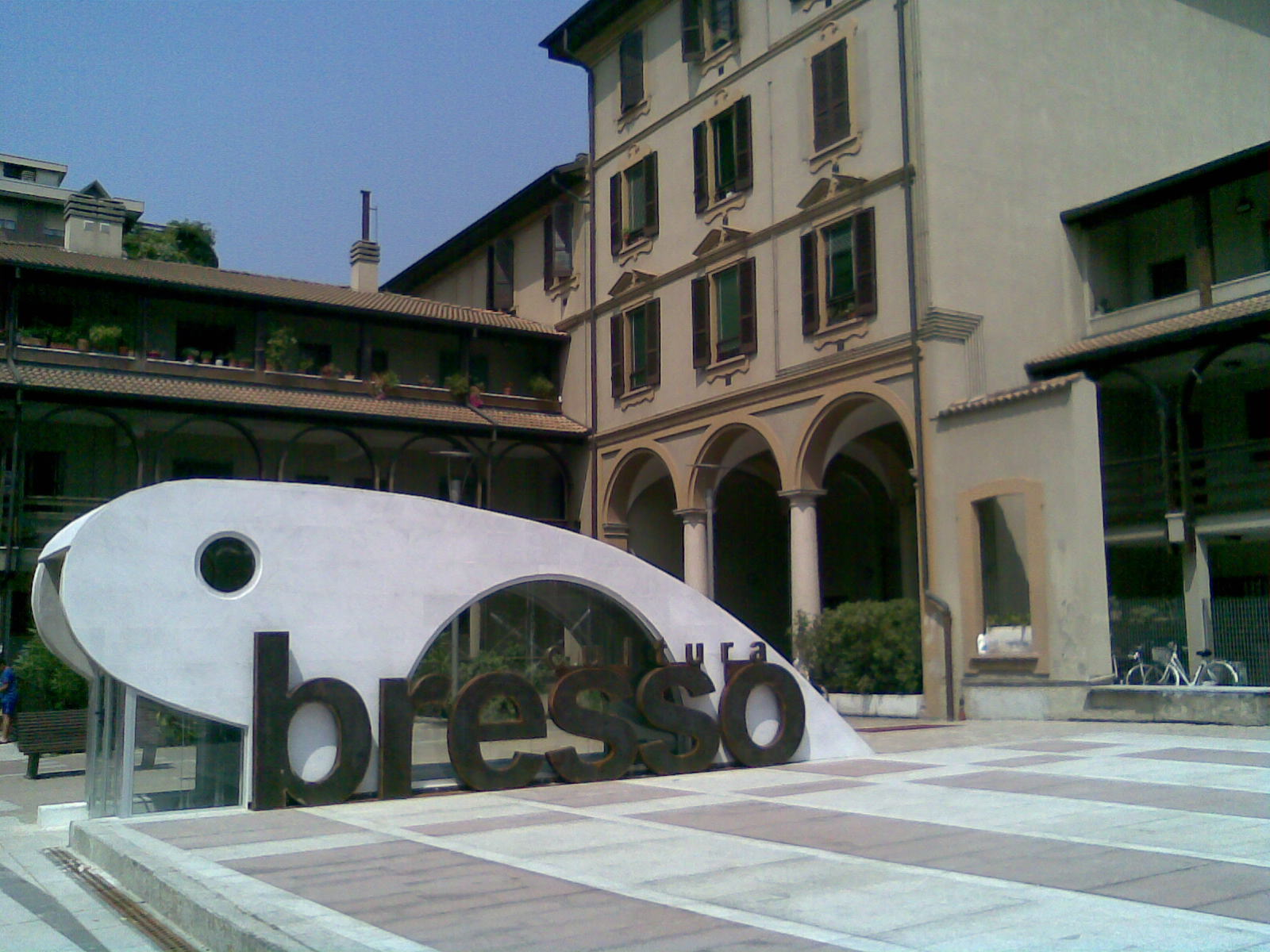
- Cavour Square in Bresso

- Coat of arms
- Interactive map of Bresso
- Location within Italy Location within Lombardy
- Coordinates: 45°32′N 9°11′E
- Country: Italy
- Region: Lombardy
- Metropolitan city: Milan (MI)

Government
  - Mayor: Simone Cairo

Area
  - Total: 3.38 km^{2} (1.31 sq mi)
- Elevation: 142 m (466 ft)

Population (2025)
  - Total: 26,530
  - Density: 7,850/km^{2} (20,300/sq mi)
- Demonym: Bressesi
- Time zone: UTC+1 (CET)
  - Summer (DST): UTC+2 (CEST)
- Postal code: 20091
- Dialing code: 02
- Website: Official website

Bresso (Milanese: Bress [ˈbrɛs]) is a municipality (comune) in the Metropolitan City of Milan in the Italian region Lombardy, located about 8 kilometres (5 mi) north of Milan. As of 2025, it has a population of 26,530 inhabitants and a population density of 7,849 persons/km², making it the most densely populated municipality in Italy outside the Province of Naples.

Bresso borders the following municipalities: Cinisello Balsamo, Cusano Milanino, Sesto San Giovanni, Cormano, Milan.

Milan's general aviation airfield is located at Bresso and is the home of the Aero Club Milano and Aero Club Bresso.

== Demographics ==
Historical population

Year	Pop.	±%
1861	1,496	—
1871	1,578	+5.5%
1881	1,728	+9.5%
1901	2,039	+18.0%
1911	2,504	+22.8%
1921	2,555	+2.0%
1931	3,615	+41.5%
1936	3,822	+5.7%

Year	Pop.	±%
1951	4,575	+19.7%
1961	11,655	+154.8%
1971	32,043	+174.9%
1981	32,650	+1.9%
1991	30,119	−7.8%
2001	27,132	−9.9%
2011	25,712	−5.2%
2021	26,081	+1.4%

Source: ISTAT

== Transport ==
Bresso Airport is in the commune.
