= 2014 International Hill Climb Cup =

2014 FIA International Hill Climb Cup

Seasons
- ← none 2015 →

The 2014 FIA International Hill Climb Cup was the first edition of the FIA International Hill Climb Cup, after the merging of the FIA European Hill Climb Cup and the FIA International Hill Climb Challenge. The season consisted of fourteen rounds, starting on 27 April with the Subida Internacional Ubrique Benaocaz in Spain, and ended on 5 October with the Bergrennen Mickhausen in Germany.

In Category 1, Bulgaria's Nikolay Zlatkov was the inaugural champion, winning three events during the season. He won the championship by 35 points ahead of Italian driver Fulvio Giuliani, who also won three events. Third place in the championship went to Karl Schagerl of Austria, who won his home event of the Sankt Andrae. The remaining events were shared between Igor Drotár, Andreas Gabat, Raúl Borreguero, Tomasz Nagorski and Tiago Reis, while Fausto Bormolini won the last two events during the season, but was ineligible to score championship points. In Category 2, Václav Janík of the Czech Republic was crowned champion by 21 points ahead of Switzerland's Tiziano Riva with another Czech driver, Jiří Svoboda, edging out Simone Faggioli by half a point for third place in the final championship standings.

== Calendar ==
Round	Dates	Venue	City	Country
1	25 – 27 April	XIX Subida Internacional Ubrique Benaocaz	Ubrique	Spain
2	9 – 11 May	Bieszczadzki Hill Climb	Bieszczadzki	Poland
3	16 – 18 May	45° Verzegnis Sella Chianzutan	Verzegnis	Italy
4	30–May – 1 June	Moris Cup Jahodná	Košice	Slovakia
5	7 – 8 June	Rampa da Covilhã/Serra da Estrela	Covilhã	Portugal
6	13 – 15 June	42° Pieve Santo Stefano-Passo dello Spino	Pieve Santo Stefano	Italy
7	21 – 22 June	GHD Gorjanci	Gornja Težka Voda	Slovenia
8	5 – 6 July	Trento Bondone	Trento	Italy
9	12 – 13 July	Sankt Andrae	Kitzeck im Sausal	Austria
10	2 – 3 August	Osnabrücker Bergrennen	Osnabrück	Germany
11	9 – 10 August	GHD Lučine	Lučine	Slovenia
12	6 – 7 September	50ª Coppa Bruno Carotti/ Rieti – Terminillo	Monte Terminillo, (Rieti)	Italy
13	27 – 28 September	44° Trofeo Vallecamonica	Malegno	Italy
14	4 – 5 October	Bergrennen Mickhausen	Mickhausen	Germany

== Event results ==
Race	Cat	Podium		
Race	Cat	Place	Driver	Car
(Spain) XIX Subida Internacional Ubrique Benaocaz	I	1	(Spain) Raúl Borreguero	Mosler MT 900 R
(Spain) XIX Subida Internacional Ubrique Benaocaz	I	2	(Spain) José Antonio Aznar	Porsche 997 GT3 Cup
(Spain) XIX Subida Internacional Ubrique Benaocaz	I	3	(Spain) Sergi Pañella	Mitsubishi Lancer Evo IX
(Spain) XIX Subida Internacional Ubrique Benaocaz	II	1	(Spain) Angela Vilariño	Norma 3000
(Spain) XIX Subida Internacional Ubrique Benaocaz	II	2	(Spain) José Antonio López-Fombona	Audi Quattro DTM
(Spain) XIX Subida Internacional Ubrique Benaocaz	II	3	n.a.	n.a.
(Poland) Bieszczadzki Hill Climb	I	1	(Poland) Tomasz Nagórski	Subaru Impreza 4
(Poland) Bieszczadzki Hill Climb	I	2	(Slovakia) Igor Drotár	Skoda Fabia WRC
(Poland) Bieszczadzki Hill Climb	I	3	(Poland) Dubai	Mitsubishi Lancer Evo
(Poland) Bieszczadzki Hill Climb	II	1	(Czech Republic) Václav Janík	Lola B02/50
(Poland) Bieszczadzki Hill Climb	II	2	(Czech Republic) Petr Trnka	Gloria C8FT
(Poland) Bieszczadzki Hill Climb	II	3	(Czech Republic) Jirí Svoboda	Norma M20F
(Italy) 45° Verzegnis Sella Chianzutan	I	1	(Austria) Andreas Gabat	Ford Escort Cosworth
(Italy) 45° Verzegnis Sella Chianzutan	I	2	(Austria) Karl Schagerl	VW Golf Rallye
(Italy) 45° Verzegnis Sella Chianzutan	I	3	(Italy) Fulvio Giuliani	Lancia Delta EVO
(Italy) 45° Verzegnis Sella Chianzutan	II	1	(Italy) Christian Merli	Osella PA 2000
(Italy) 45° Verzegnis Sella Chianzutan	II	2	(Italy) Omar Magliona	Osella PA 21Evo
(Italy) 45° Verzegnis Sella Chianzutan	II	3	(Italy) Achille Lombardi	Radical SR 4
(Slovakia) Moris Cup Jahondná	I	1	(Poland) Tomasz Nagórski	Subaru Impreza 4
(Slovakia) Moris Cup Jahondná	I	2	(Slovakia) Igor Drotár	Skoda Fabia WRC
(Slovakia) Moris Cup Jahondná	I	3	(Poland) Dubai	Mitsubishi Lancer Evo
(Slovakia) Moris Cup Jahondná	II	1	(Czech Republic) Václav Janík	Lola B02/50
(Slovakia) Moris Cup Jahondná	II	2	(Czech Republic) Petr Trnka	Gloria C8FT
(Slovakia) Moris Cup Jahondná	II	3	(Czech Republic) Jirí Svoboda	Norma M20F
(Portugal) Rampa da Covilhã/Serra da Estrela	I	1	(Portugal) Tiago Reis	Ford Fiesta S2000
(Portugal) Rampa da Covilhã/Serra da Estrela	I	2	(Portugal) Manuel Correia	Skoda Fabia
(Portugal) Rampa da Covilhã/Serra da Estrela	I	3	n.a	n.a
(Portugal) Rampa da Covilhã/Serra da Estrela	II	1	n.a	n.a
(Portugal) Rampa da Covilhã/Serra da Estrela	II	2	n.a	n.a
(Portugal) Rampa da Covilhã/Serra da Estrela	II	3	n.a	n.a
(Italy) 42° Pieve Santo Stefano-Passo dello Spino	I	1	(Italy) Fulvio Giuliani	Lancia Delta EVO
(Italy) 42° Pieve Santo Stefano-Passo dello Spino	I	2	(Bulgaria) Nikolay Zlatkov	Audi Quattro S1
(Italy) 42° Pieve Santo Stefano-Passo dello Spino	I	3	(Italy) Roberto di Giuseppe	Alfa Romeo 155 GTA
(Italy) 42° Pieve Santo Stefano-Passo dello Spino	II	1	(Italy) Simone Faggioli	Norma M20FC
(Italy) 42° Pieve Santo Stefano-Passo dello Spino	II	2	(Italy) Christian Merli	Osella PA 2000
(Italy) 42° Pieve Santo Stefano-Passo dello Spino	II	3	(Italy) Omar Magliona	Osella PA 21/S EVO
(Slovenia) GHD Gorjanci	I	1	(Bulgaria) Nikolay Zlatkov	Audi Quattro S1
(Slovenia) GHD Gorjanci	I	2	(Croatia) Istvan Kavecz	BMW E90
(Slovenia) GHD Gorjanci	I	3	(Croatia) Tomislav Muhvić	Mitsubishi Evo IX
(Slovenia) GHD Gorjanci	II	1	(Czech Republic) Václav Janík	Lola B02/50
(Slovenia) GHD Gorjanci	II	2	(Czech Republic) Jirí Svoboda	Norma M20F
(Slovenia) GHD Gorjanci	II	3	(Hungary) Laszlo Szasz	Reynard Zytek R 3000
(Italy) Trento Bondone	I	1	(Italy) Fulvio Giuliani	Lancia Delta EVO
(Italy) Trento Bondone	I	2	(Italy) Marco Gramenzi	Alfa Romeo
(Italy) Trento Bondone	I	3	(Italy) Michele Ghirardo	Honda Civic EK4
(Italy) Trento Bondone	II	1	(Italy) Simone Faggioli	Norma M20FC
(Italy) Trento Bondone	II	2	(Italy) Christian Merli	Osella PA 2000
(Italy) Trento Bondone	II	3	(Italy) Domenico Scola	Osella PA 2000
(Austria) Sankt Andrae Kitzeck	I	1	(Austria) Karl Schagerl	VW Golf Rallye
(Austria) Sankt Andrae Kitzeck	I	2	(Bulgaria) Nikolay Zlatkov	Audi Quattro S1
(Austria) Sankt Andrae Kitzeck	I	3	(Austria) Pailer Felix	Lancia Idelta Integrale
(Austria) Sankt Andrae Kitzeck	II	1	(Switzerland) Eric Berguerand	Lola FA 99 F3000
(Austria) Sankt Andrae Kitzeck	II	2	(Switzerland) Riva Tiziano	Reynard 92D Cosworth
(Austria) Sankt Andrae Kitzeck	II	3	(Hungary) Laszlo Szasz	Reynard Zytek R 3000
(Germany) Osnabrücker Bergrennen	I	1	(Bulgaria) Nikolay Zlatkov	Audi Quattro S1
(Germany) Osnabrücker Bergrennen	I	2	(France) Nicolas Werver	Porsche GT3 Cup 997
(Germany) Osnabrücker Bergrennen	I	3	(Austria) René Ruch	Ferrari 355 GT
(Germany) Osnabrücker Bergrennen	II	1	(Switzerland) Eric Berguerand	Lola FA 99 F3000
(Germany) Osnabrücker Bergrennen	II	2	(Slovakia) Patrik Zajelsnik	Norma M20F
(Germany) Osnabrücker Bergrennen	II	3	(Switzerland) Philippe Guélat	Lola T94/50 Cosworth F3000
(Slovenia) GHD Lučine	I	1	(Bulgaria) Nikolay Zlatkov	Audi Quattro S1
(Slovenia) GHD Lučine	I	2	(Italy) Fulvio Giuliani	Lancia Delta EVO
(Slovenia) GHD Lučine	I	3	(Slovakia) Matevž Boh	Mitsubishi Lancer Evo IX
(Slovenia) GHD Lučine	II	1	(Italy) Federico Liber	Formula Gloria C8F
(Slovenia) GHD Lučine	II	2	(Switzerland) Riva Tiziano	Reynard 92D Cosworth
(Slovenia) GHD Lučine	II	3	(Czech Republic) Václav Janík	Lola B02/50
(Italy) 50ª Coppa Bruno Carotti	I	1	(Italy) Marco Iacoangeli	BMW 320i
(Italy) 50ª Coppa Bruno Carotti	I	2	(Italy) Piero Nappi	Ferrari 550
(Italy) 50ª Coppa Bruno Carotti	I	3	(Italy) Davide C. Tancredi	Ford Escort RS Turbo
(Italy) 50ª Coppa Bruno Carotti	II	1	(Italy) Simone Faggioli	Norma M20FC
(Italy) 50ª Coppa Bruno Carotti	II	2	(Italy) Domenico Scola	Osella PA 2000
(Italy) 50ª Coppa Bruno Carotti	II	3	(Italy) Omar Magliona	Osella PA 21Evo
(Italy) 44° Trofeo Vallecamonica	I	1	(Italy) Fulvio Giuliani	Lancia Delta EVO
(Italy) 44° Trofeo Vallecamonica	I	2	(Italy) Marco Sbrollini	Lancia Delta Evo
(Italy) 44° Trofeo Vallecamonica	I	3	(Italy) Luigi Sambuco	Renault Clio RS
(Italy) 44° Trofeo Vallecamonica	II	1	(Italy) Fausto Bormolini	Reynard K02
(Italy) 44° Trofeo Vallecamonica	II	2	(Switzerland) Riva Tiziano	Reynard 92D Cosworth
(Italy) 44° Trofeo Vallecamonica	II	3	(Italy) Christian Merli	Osella PA 2000
(Germany) Bergrennen Mickhausen	I	1	(Austria) Andreas Gabat	Ford Escort Cosworth
(Germany) Bergrennen Mickhausen	I	2	(Austria) Karl Schagerl	VW Golf Rallye
(Germany) Bergrennen Mickhausen	I	3	(Bulgaria) Nikolay Zlatkov	Audi Quattro S1
(Germany) Bergrennen Mickhausen	II	1	(Italy) Simone Faggioli	Norma M20FC
(Germany) Bergrennen Mickhausen	II	2	(Italy) Christian Merli	Osella PA 2000
(Germany) Bergrennen Mickhausen	II	3	(Switzerland) Eric Berguerand	Lola FA 99 F3000

== See also ==
- European Hill Climb Championship
- Hillclimbing
- Mont Ventoux Hill Climb
