= Aguzzoli =

Defunct Italian automobile producer

Aguzzoli & Co.
- Type: Private
- Industry: Automotive
- Founded: 1962; 64 years ago
- Founder: Sergio Aguzzoli; Luigi Bertocco
- Defunct: 1964
- Fate: Dissolved
- Headquarters: Parma, Italy

Aguzzoli was a short-lived Italian manufacturer of racing and sports cars during the early 1960s.

== History ==
Sergio Aguzzoli (12 May 1929 – 31 August 2008) was born in a family of meat entrepreneurs. However, he was more interested in car racing, and in the mid-1950s he participated in various local and national competitions in Italy, including four editions of the Mille Miglia. In 1955 he had become a partner of the Alfa Romeo dealership in Parma. Around this time he started preparing go-karts, after which he decided to move on to the creation of a full-scale, handmade race car.

In 1962 he and his business partner, former Ferrari technician and test driver Luigi Bertocco, founded in Parma "Aguzzoli & Co." and started designing the first sports car; Aguzzoli christened it Condor which was his nickname since his childhood. The intention of the two partners was to use Aguzzoli's funds and Bertocco's know-how to create a few Alfa Romeo-powered race cars using a rear mid-engine, rear-wheel-drive layout, making them successful in racing, then producing a small number – about a hundred – of road-going models.

Eventually, Bertocco claimed ownership of the car as its designer and maker while Aguzzoli, who had invested large sums in the project, believed the opposite. This disagreement led to the company's dissolution in 1964, after just two (possibly three) race cars built. These cars were relatively successful in national-scale competitions, and continued to be deployed well after the company's closure. In the end, a court ruling proved Aguzzoli right over Bertocco, but he never resumed production and left the world of sports cars for good, instead following in his father's footsteps in the grocery trade.

== Condor ==
=== Development ===
The first Condor was built around the 1,300 cc Alfa Romeo Twin Cam engine originally from a Giulietta. The tubular frame was commissioned to Neri & Bonacini whom were possibly helped by a young Giampaolo Dallara. The result was a lightweight car sporting 128 hp (95 kW), with an inverted differential gearbox from a Citroën DS, a wheel base of 2,200 mm (87 in), and an axle track of 1,320 mm (52 in). The sore point was the aluminium bodywork, ordered in a hurry to Piero Drogo's Carrozzeria Sports Cars, and which aroused perplexity when not mockery, now as then:

"Ugliest Alfa Romeo [...]. Looks like the designer was frightened by a Ford Anglia, but at least he's offered an interesting break from Alfa convention."

— Motor Racing. No. 6 (June 1965).

"The dress of the Condor #1 was born rather ungraceful, not to say definitely ugly."

— Nino Balestra, "Marche Italiane Scomparse: Aguzzoli "Condor"" EpocAuto. No. 7 (2019).

"The Alfa-engined Aguzzoli Condor, of which only two, one horrible, one pretty, were built [...]."

— Gordon Cruickshank, "Swooning sixties" Motor Sport Magazine. (March 2019).

From the experience gained from the prototype Condor #1, the company started working on the second car, which was slightly longer (wheel base 2,250 mm (89 in)) and wider (axle track 1,350 mm (53 in)). The 1,600 cc engine came initially from an Alfa Romeo Giulia, but was soon replaced by a same-sized but more performing unit from a Giulia TZ with a power output of 165 hp (123 kW) at 7,500 rpm. The car was fitted with two Weber carburetors and four wheel disc brakes.
This time, the bodywork construction was committed to sculptor and car designer Franco Reggiani at his workshop at Sant'Ilario d'Enza. Once mounted on the chassis, this handmade fiberglass body resulted in a car with decidedly more harmonious and dynamic shapes than its predecessor. The total weight of the Condor #2 was just 550 kg (1,213 lb), way less than the already lightweight Giulia TZ which had the same engine. The completed car was painted black and presented at the Geneva Motor Show where it was received positively.

=== Racing ===
Both Condor made their racing debut on 12 July 1964 when they participated at the Trento-Bondone Hill Climb; neither of the two cars achieved significant scores. After having upgraded the Condor #1 with a larger 1,600 cc engine, on 8 December 1964 both cars entered the Coppa FISA race at Monza, driven by Tino Brambilla (#1) and Bertocco (#2); the two finished first and second respectively in the 1.6 L prototype class.
At the international level of the World Sportscar Championship, the Condor were far less successful. On 25 April 1965 both cars entered the 1000 km Monza in the 1.6 L prototype class; one, driven by Brambilla, did not finish and the other did not start.
The Condor #2 received further upgrades such as a displacement increase to 1,730 cc, a power increase to 175 hp (130 kW) at 9,500 rpm, the adoption of dry sump, 13-inch wheels and a Hewland five-speed gearbox. This version, driven by Bertocco, was the overall winner of the Castione de' Baratti-Neviano degli Arduini Hill Climb on 20 June 1965. (Note: A source suggests that this late iteration of the Condor #2 was actually a different, third car.) On 17 July 1966 it was intended to participate at the Mugello Grand Prix in the 2.0 prototype class, but did not show up. The same happened to another Aguzzoli car at Tulln-Langenlebarn on 2 October 1966.
A Condor took part to the 1000 km Monza driven by former Grand Prix motorcycle racer Umberto Masetti.

=== Fate ===
At some point after the company's dissolution, the Condor #1 was stripped of Drogo's bodywork, which was used as a sign for a mechanical workshop, while the remaining parts were likely cannibalized. Unconfirmed rumors claim that the car was later restored, fitted with a new, better-looking bodywork made by Reggiani and that it is now part of an unspecified private collection.
The Condor #2 enjoyed a better fate; at the end of its racing career, it was shelved in a warehouse and soon forgotten. It was rediscovered and sold in 2003 in order to be restored and returned to the original 1,600 cc displacement.
