= ASA (automobile) =

ASA 1000 GT
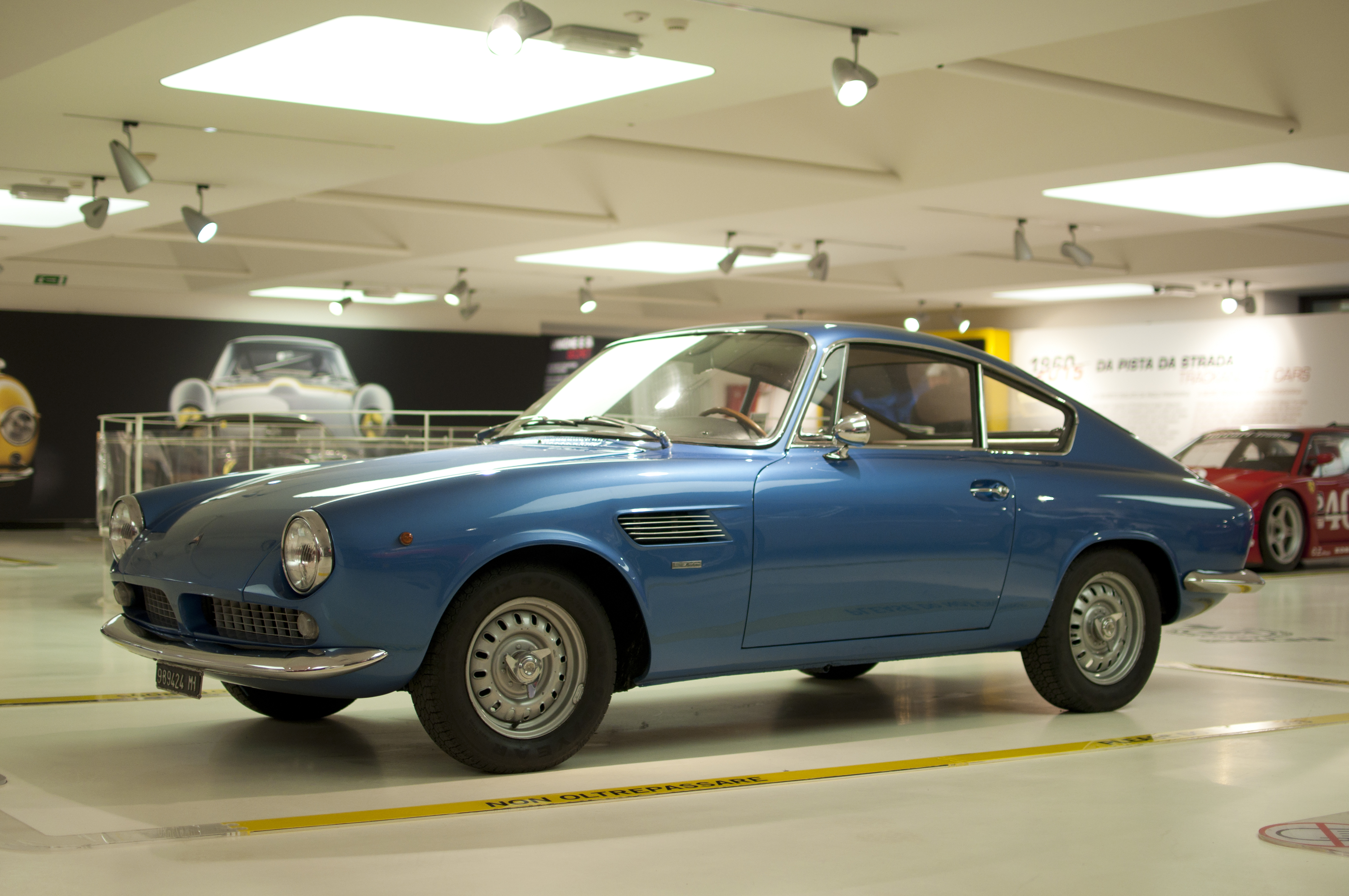
- ASA 1000 GT Coupé

Overview
- Manufacturer: ASA
- Also called: Ferrarina
- Production: 1964-1967
- Assembly: Italy: Milan
- Designer: Giorgetto Giugiaro at Bertone

Body and chassis
- Class: Grand tourer
- Body style: 2-door coupé; 2-door convertible
- Layout: Longitudinal front-engine, rear-wheel drive

Powertrain
- Engine: 1,032 cc Tipo 141 I4 (gasoline); 1,092 cc Tipo 141 I4 (gasoline) (ASA 411 racing version)
- Transmission: 4-speed Sunbeam manual with overdrive; 5-speed manual (optional)

Dimensions
- Wheelbase: 2,200 mm (86.6 in)
- Curb weight: 780 kg (1,720 lb); 709 kg (1,562 lb) (ASA 411 racing version)

ASA (Autocostruzioni Società per Azioni) was an Italian automobile manufacturer active from 1961 to 1969, which is known for manufacturing the ASA 1000 GT. This car was developed by Ferrari engineers in the late 1950s as a less expensive, compact alternative to existing Ferrari GT cars. ASA used inline-four and straight-six engines derived from the "250" 3-litre V12 designed by Gioacchino Colombo. The chassis was developed by Giotto Bizzarrini and was derived from the tubular frame chassis of the 250 GTO.

The prototype that would become the ASA 1000 GT was first presented by Carrozzeria Bertone (Geneva 1961) under the name "Mille". Following this debut in late 1961, Enzo Ferrari decided to not sell the new car as a Ferrari and entrusted production to a close friend, Oronzio de Nora. The car was manufactured in Milan by a newly formed company called ASA (owned by the De Nora Electrochemical Group) from 1964 to 1969. The 1000 GT model was officially introduced in 1962, but due to production difficulties series production did not begin until 1964.

== ASA 1000 GT ==
=== Design and development by Ferrari ===
The ASA 1000 GT originated in a late 1950s experimental project by Ferrari engineers to create a less expensive, compact alternative to existing Ferrari GT cars. This project was designated "854" by the factory (for 850cc, 4 cylinders), however it was commonly but unofficially named "Ferrarina," meaning "Little Ferrari."

The "Ferrarina" engine was derived from a late 1950s experimental inline-4, designated Tipo 122. This was basically a four-cylinder, 850 cc (52 cu in) slice of a Colombo V12 from a Ferrari 212, with a bore and stroke of 65 x 64mm and supplied by two Weber 38DCO carburetors. The Tipo 122 engine produced 68 horsepower (51 kW) at 7000 rpm. The Tipo 122 was followed by the more powerful and slightly higher displacement Tipo 125 and 126 engines. The Tipo 126 engine displaced 973 cc and produced 86 horsepower (64 kW) at 7000 rpm. These engines were tested in the "Ferrarina" prototype, a 2-door notchback coupe on a Fiat 1100 or 1200 chassis with a Pininfarina body, which was used by Enzo Ferrari as his personal transportation for some time in the late 1950s. The final engine design was completed in 1960 as the Tipo 141, with 1032cc displacement, bore and stroke of 69 mm x 69 mm, a single overhead cam and two Weber 38DCOA carburetors. According to Ferrari's records, this engine produced 100 horsepower (75 kW) at 7200 rpm with a 9:1 compression ratio.

Following Ferrari's development work on the 854/"Ferrarina" prototype, a new prototype called the "Mille" ("one thousand" in Italian) was shown at the 1961 Turin Auto Show on the Bertone stand. The Mille was an entirely new car based on the 854 project, with 2-door fastback coupé bodywork designed by Giorgetto Giugiaro at Bertone. Although this prototype had no Ferrari badging, its design echoed contemporary Ferrari GT models and the origin of the design within Ferrari was well publicized. Despite positive publicity and official support of the project from Ferrari, at the time of the Mille's debut there were no plans for Ferrari to mass-produce the design. Ferrari engineers had planned around annual production of 3000-5000 cars, which would sell for approximately US$2600 each. Not only was the Ferrari factory inadequate for this kind of volume production, Enzo Ferrari was unwilling to expand it in order to produce the Mille. Even before the Turin debut of the Mille, Ferrari had begun searching for another company that would buy the design and bring it to market.

=== Formation of ASA and 1000 GT production ===
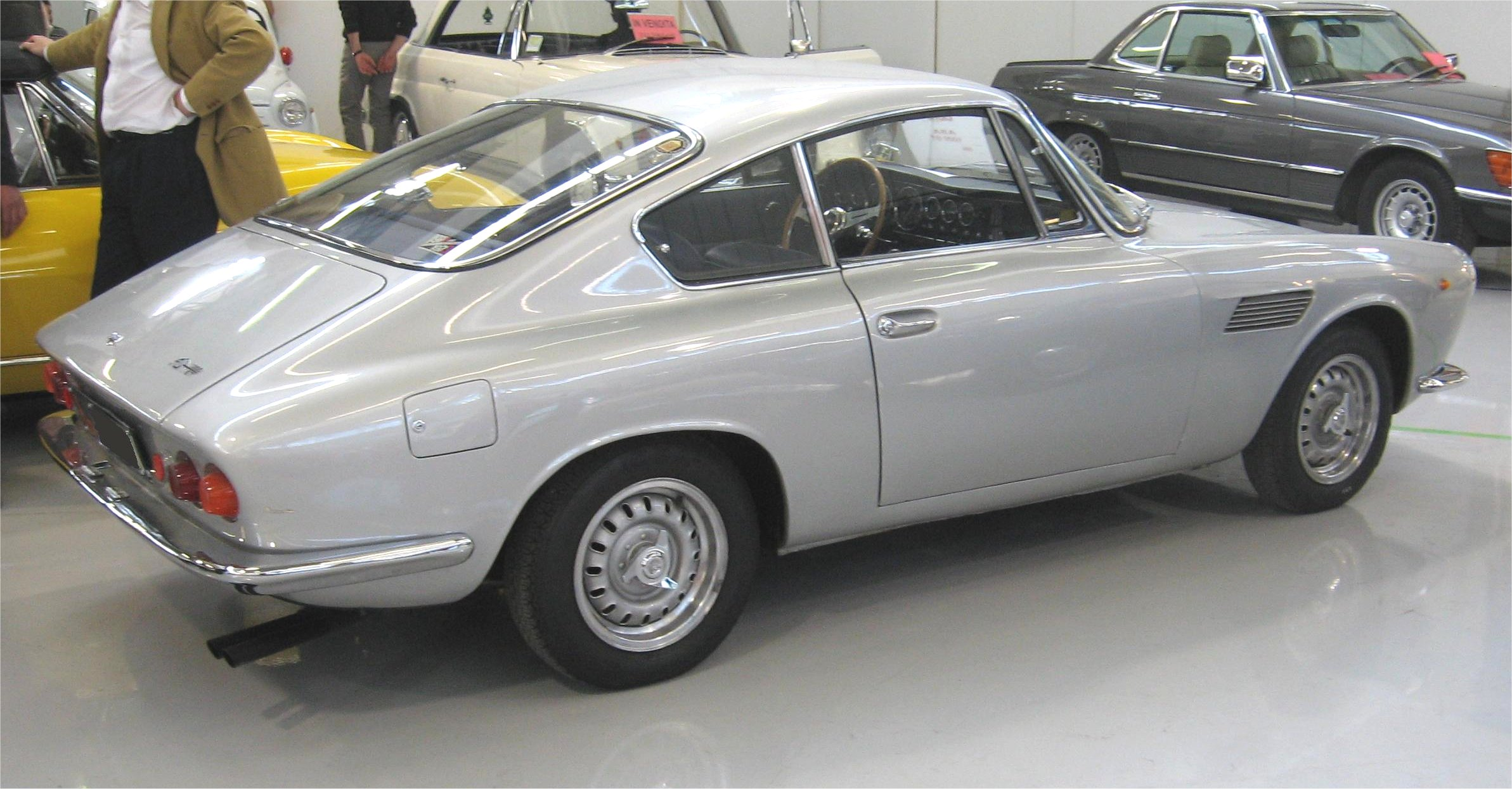
ASA 1000 GT rear view

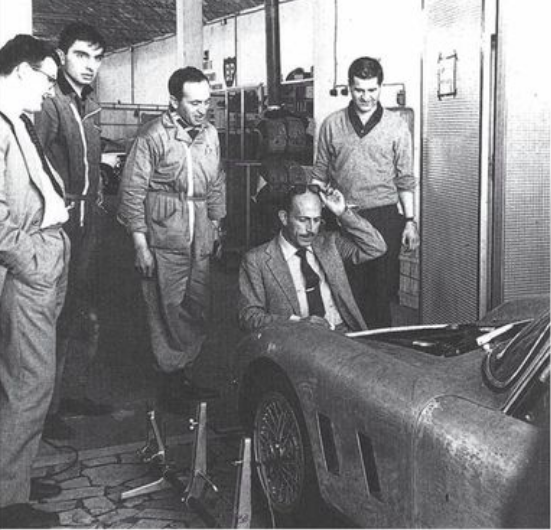
ASA head of operations Niccolò de Nora (kneeling) and Giotto Bizzarrini (right) inspecting an ASA 1000 GTC alongside ASA staff

By 1962, Enzo Ferrari decided to entrust production of the Ferrarina to close friend Oronzio de Nora and his son, Niccolò de Nora. The de Nora Electrochemical Group formed a new company for this purpose under the name ASA (Autocostruzioni Società per Azioni). ASA operations were headed by Niccolò de Nora. Also involved in ASA management were race drivers Lorenzo Bandini, Gerino Gerini, and Giancarlo Baghetti and engineer Giotto Bizzarrini. The new firm had its headquarters on via San Faustino in Milan.

The ASA 1000 GT production version, almost unchanged from the "Mille" prototype, was officially introduced at the 1962 Turin Auto Show. Despite this debut, due to production difficulties series production of the 1000 GT did not begin until 1964. The production 1000 GT used the 1032cc Tipo 141 I4 engine fitted with 40DCOE9 carburetors. It produced a stated 91 horsepower (68 kW) at 6800 rpm, a HP/Litre ratio better than the contemporary Ferrari 275 GTB. Other sources report an output of 95.6 horsepower (71.3 kW) at 7000 rpm. Production cars used a tubular spaceframe chassis designed by Giotto Bizzarrini, based on the 250 GTO. It was equipped with double wishbone front suspension and a live axle at the rear. Both front and rear of the car were equipped with coil springs, tubular dampers, an anti-roll bar and disk brakes. The coupe was bodied in steel with aluminum hood and trunk lids and weighed 1,720 pounds (780 kg) dry. Autocar magazine tested the 1000 GT shortly after its introduction and recorded a 0-60 mph time of 14.0 seconds and a 1/4 mile run in 19.3 seconds.

At least two fiberglass-bodied convertibles were also produced. One of the convertibles was displayed at the 1962 Turin auto show alongside the coupe. Other than the fiberglass body, the convertible was mechanically identical to the 1000 GT coupe.

=== Commercial reception ===
The first production ASA 1000 GT couple was sold for $5920 in September 1964. Luigi Chinetti was the sole US importer of ASA and a majority of the 1000 GT production was sent to his dealership. Despite reportedly excellent driving dynamics and reliability, 1000 GT sales were low. The brand had little name recognition and Chinetti's American customers in particular preferred the much more powerful Ferraris. Additionally, the 1000 GT was extremely expensive for the performance offered, with retail prices around US$6000 when a new Chevrolet Corvette equipped with a much more powerful 427 c.i. V8 engine cost US$4500. In order to sell their stock of ASAs, Chinetti's dealership steadily lowered prices during the late 1960s and early 1970s. A new 1000 GT sold for $1800 in 1973, far below cost.

ASA production never achieved the anticipated volume of 3000-5000 cars per year. Even when series production was fully operational during 1964 and 1965, only one car was built per week. Exact production figures are unknown, but sources agree that less than 100 ASA cars of all types were constructed. One source estimates that 50-75 1000 GTs were produced in total between 1964 and 1967, with an additional handful of convertibles and competition cars. The ASA factory officially closed in 1967, but some cars were assembled from spare parts and sold as new up through the early 1970s.

== Competition cars ==
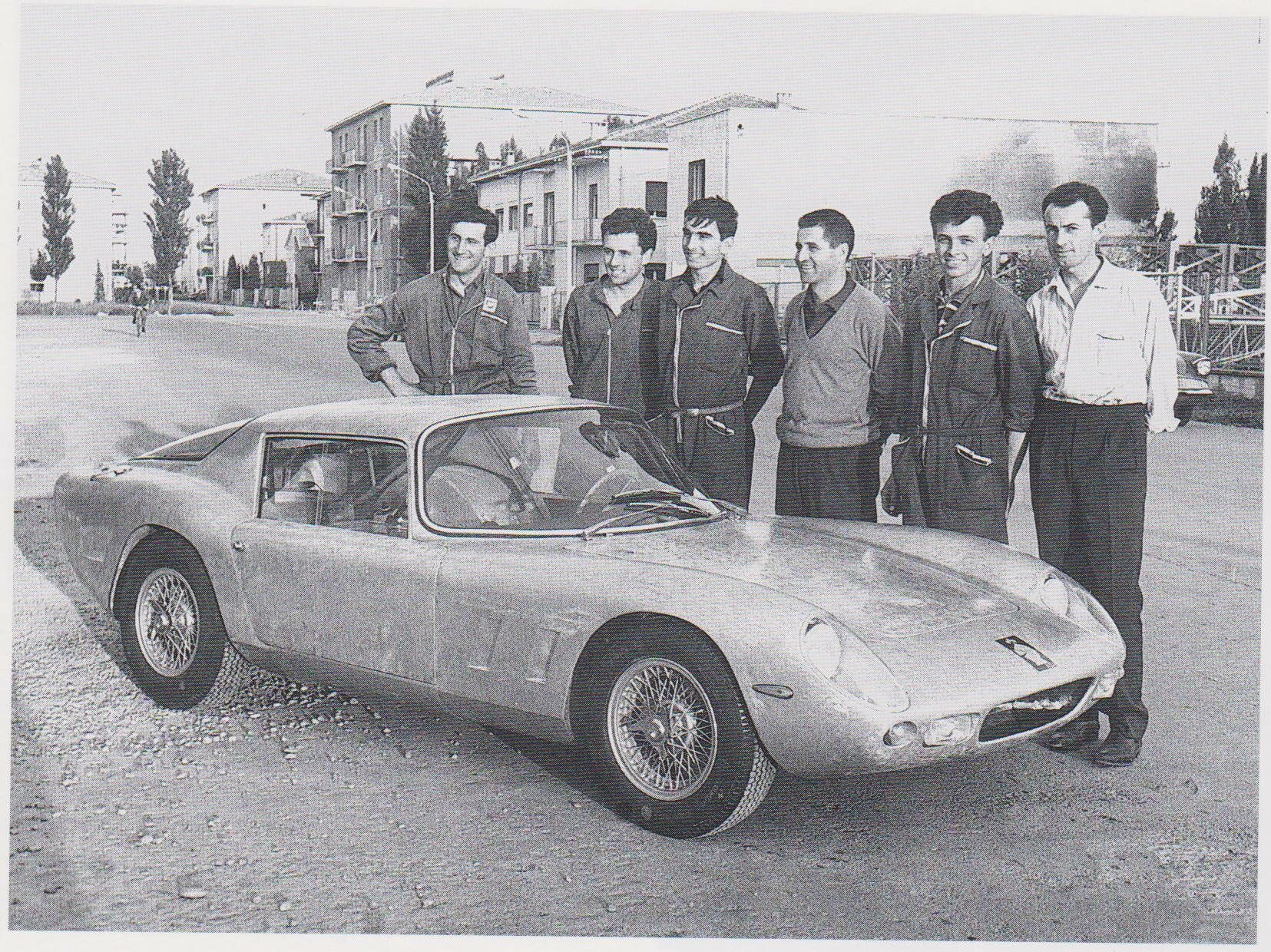
ASA 1000 GTC

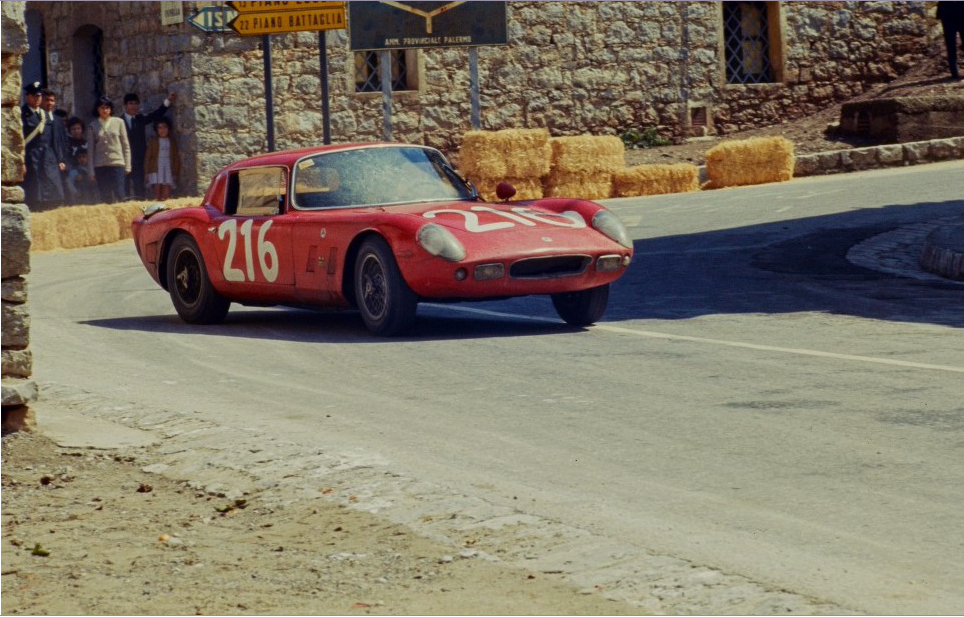
ASA 411 GTS during 1966 Targa Florio

The ASA 1000 GTC was a sports racing car built in 1963 by Giotto Bizzarrini and based on a production 1000 GT. The car was developed under a newly-founded Società Autostar workshop. The body was designed and built by Piero Drogo's Carrozzeria Sports Cars. The engine had its displacement reduced to 995 cc to meet the under 1.0-litre racing classification. The tubular chassis with aluminium body saved the weight to a total of 590 kg (1,300 lb). Bizzarrini and Drogo also built a larger displacement car called 1300 GTC with 1.3-litre engine that debuted at the 1966 Trento-Bondone Hill Climb.

The ASA Berlinetta 411 was the competition version of the 1000 GT Coupé, introduced at the 1965 Paris Motor Show. It used the engine from the 1000 GT enlarged to 1,092 cc (66.6 cu in) by increasing the cylinder bore from 69 to 71 mm. This engine produced 104 bhp (78 kW) at 7500 rpm. The Berlinetta 411 had a lightweight all-aluminum body and plexiglass windows, resulting in a dry weight of 709 kilograms (1,562 lb) compared to the regular 1000 GT's 780 kilograms (1,720 lb). Other modifications included wider tires and a competition gas filler. The exact number produced is unknown. Two competition 1000 GTs were entered in the 1965 Targa Florio. They placed 17th and 22nd overall, 3rd and 4th place in the 1000-1600cc prototype class.

ASA also manufactured four fiberglass-bodied competition cars called the RB613 or Roll Bar 1300. These featured a more aerodynamic body designed by Luigi Chinetti Jr. and manufactured by Carrozzeria Corbetta. The chassis had an integrated roll bar, the source of the "RB" abbreviation in the name. The engine was a 1.3 liter straight-six, the design based on 1/2 of the Ferrari 250 V12. Two ASA RB613s were raced at the 1966 24 Hours of Le Mans, one an ASA factory entry and one entered by Luigi Chinetti's North American Racing Team. Neither car finished the race. NART entered another RB613 in the 1967 Daytona 24 Hours. Driven by Suzy Dietrich and Donna Mae Mims, the ASA finished 24th. The same driver team again drove the ASA for NART in the 1967 Sebring 12 Hours, finishing 25th.

A similar 1.8 liter 4-cylinder RB618 or Roll Bar 1800 competition model was developed for the American market. The number produced and racing history of this model is unknown.
