= IHCC =

IHCC may refer to:

- FIA International Hill Climb Cup
- International Holocaust Cartoon Competition
- Inver Hills Community College
- Indian Hills Community College (Iowa)
