= Suzy Dietrich =

American amateur sports car racing driver

- Dietrich, pictured in the mid-1950s
- Nationality: American
- Born: Suzanne Bell; December 23, 1926 Toledo, Ohio, U.S.
- Died: June 13, 2015 (aged 88) Huron, Ohio, U.S.

Sports Car Club of America
- Years active: 1952–1967

Suzanne Ruth Dietrich (née Bell; 23 December 1926 – 13 June 2015) was an American amateur sports car racing driver, described as one of the pioneers of female motor racing. A school librarian, Dietrich was introduced into sports car racing by her husband. She spent most of her motor racing career in regional Sports Car Club of America (SCCA) races, however in the late 1960s, she took part in international-standard endurance events at Sebring and Daytona. During the early years of her career, she typically drove an MG TC, while later she raced a variety of Elvas and Porsches.

== Life and career ==
Born Suzanne Bell in Toledo, Ohio, Dietrich met her husband, Charles 'Chuck' Dietrich in high-school. She began racing in regional Sports Car Club of America (SCCA) ladies' events in 1953, racing an MG TC. Many of her early successes came at races at the Cumberland Municipal Airport in Maryland; she finished second in the ladies race in July 1953 and 1954, before winning the race in 1955. She also enjoyed victories in preliminaries at Watkins Glen International and in SCCA Regional races at Dunkirk. In the SCCA National Sports Car Championship, her results were more modest, but she achieved a fifth-place finish at the 1961 SCCA National at Watkins Glen, racing a Porsche 356.

She raced less frequently from 1962, but in 1966, she entered the 24 Hours of Daytona, driving a Sunbeam Alpine with Janet Guthrie and Donna Mae Mims. The trio finished 32nd and, along with teammates in another Sunbeam (Smokey Drolet and Rosemary Smith; 30th overall), became the first women's teams to finish at the 24 Hours of Daytona. At the same race the following year, racing an ASA 411, Dietrich partnered Mims and the pair finished 24th.

After her retirement from racing, she wrote for the Sandusky Register and remained active as an administrator within the Sports Car Club of America. She suffered a stroke, and later died, in 2015, aged 88.
