= Carrozzeria Sports Cars =

Italian coachbuilding company

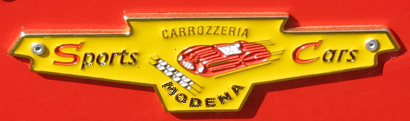
- Formerly: Sports Cars Carrozzeria di Marchesini, Cavalieri e Drogo S.d.f.; Sports Cars di Benedetti & Cie.; Sports Cars di Drogo Piero e Allegretti Mario S.d.f.
- Company type: Privately held company
- Industry: Automotive
- Predecessor: Marchesini & Cavalieri S.d.f.
- Founded: November 1, 1960; 65 years ago in Modena, Italy
- Founder: Piero Drogo; Lino Marchesini; Celso Cavalieri
- Defunct: December 31, 1971
- Fate: Bankrupted
- Successor: Sports Cars S.a.s. di Drogo & Vassallo; Carrozzeria ABS
- Headquarters: Italy
- Key people: Piero Drogo, Mario Allegretti
- Services: Coachbuilding; Automotive design

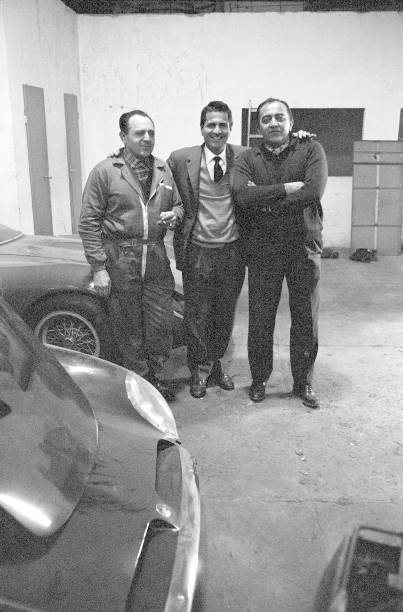
From left: Mario Allegretti, Giotto Bizzarrini and Piero Drogo.

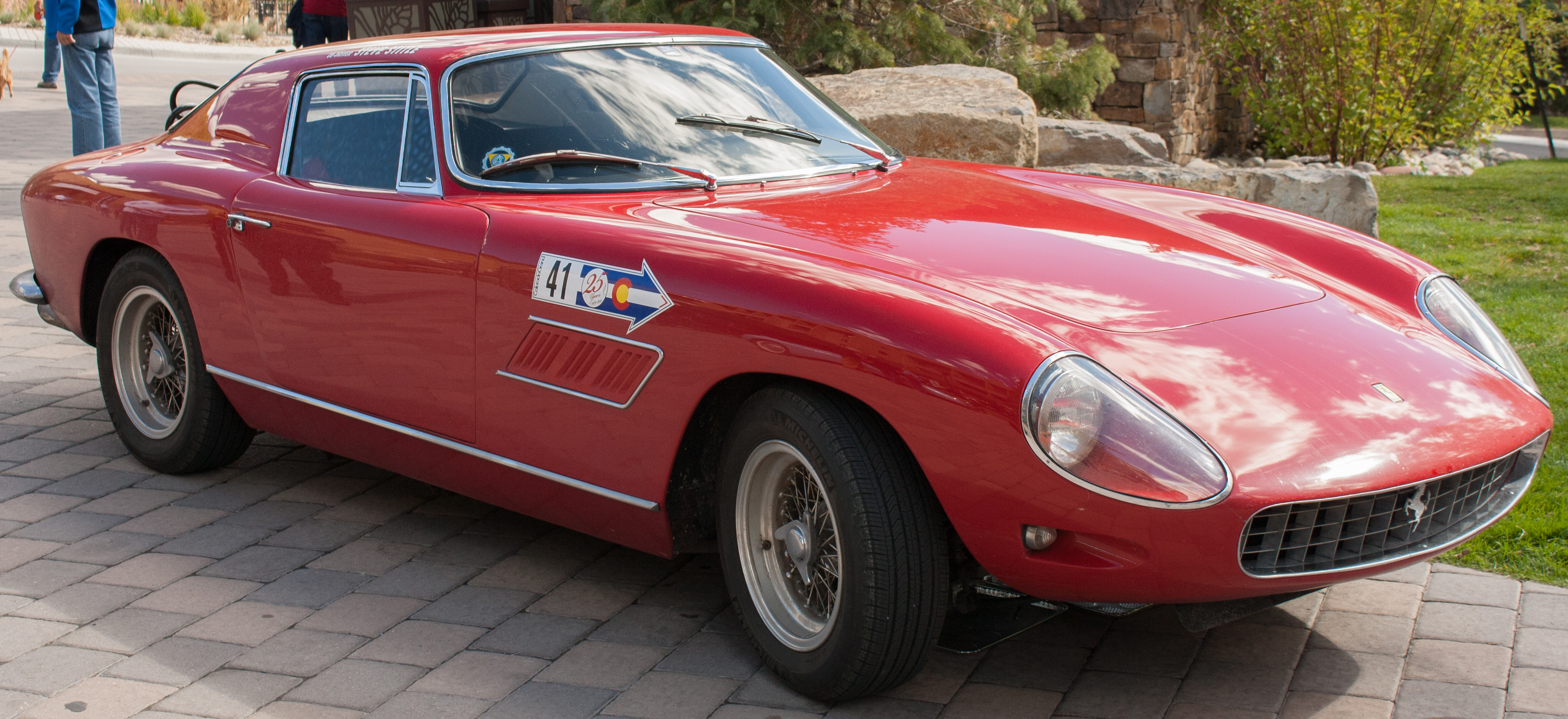
Ferrari 250 GT Coupé rebodied by Drogo

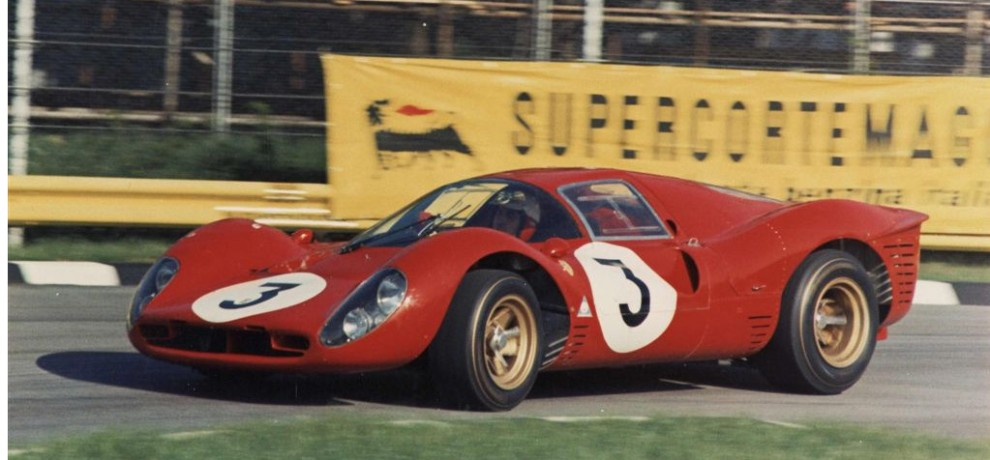
Ferrari 330 P4

Carrozzeria Sports Cars was a small carrozzeria in Modena, Italy, which produced sports and racing car bodies from 1960 until 1971. The company was founded by one-time Formula One driver, Piero Drogo along with coachbuilders Lino Marchesini and Celso Cavalieri. As the public face of the company, Drogo's name became synonymous with the cars produced by C.S.C., which are often referred to as "Drogo" bodies or designs. The workshop constructed bodies for many companies, racing teams and individuals including Scuderia Ferrari, Scuderia Serenissima, Iso and Giotto Bizzarrini. Financial difficulties led to the closure of Carrozzeria Sports Cars in 1971.

== History ==
Carrozzeria Sports Cars began in 1960, when Piero Drogo entered into a partnership in Lino Marchesini and Celso Cavalieri's preexisting company, "Marchesini & Cavalieri S.d.f". Shortly thereafter, the business' name was changed to "Sports Cars Carrozzeria di Marchesini, Cavalieri e Drogo S.d.f." This business would become commonly known as Carrozzeria Sports Cars, although it changed legal names several times during its existence. In 1963 the company became known as "Sports Cars di Benedetti & Cie." after new co-owner Otello Benedetti. In 1970, the name was changed again to "Sports Cars di Drogo Piero e Allegretti Mario S.d.f."

Carrozzeria Sports Cars was located in Modena, near the original site of the Aerautodromo di Modena. The workshop was located at the following addresses:

- Via Pellegrino Munari 3
- Viale Jacopo Barozzi 126
- Via Emilia Ovest 524
- Via Emilia Ovest 800

By 1971, Carrozzeria Sports Cars was facing financial difficulties due to high material/labor costs and a capital shortage. In June 1971, Drogo published an editorial in the magazine Autosprint titled "Modena S.O.S.", which appealed to private and/or public investment to assist C.S.C. and other small Modenese manufacturers facing economic ruin. Drogo's efforts to save the business were ultimately unsuccessful and C.S.C. declared bankruptcy on December 31, 1971.

After the dissolution of the Carrozzeria in 1971, Piero Drogo briefly ran a dealership under the name "Sports Cars S.a.s. di Drogo & Vassallo" on the same premises previously used by C.S.C. Former C.S.C. employees founded and/or worked in many other small carrozzeria in the Modena area, including Carrozzeria ABS (founded by ex-C.S.C. employees Allegretti and Bonifatti) which shared premises with Sports Cars S.a.s., Carrozzeria Sport (no "s") Cars (founded by Walter Giusti and another ex-Drogo employee) and Bacchelli & Villa (a.k.a. Carrozzeria Auto Sport, founded by Franco Bacchelli and Roberto Villa).

=== Customers ===
Carrozzeria Sports Cars operated from 1960 to late 1971, during which time the company produced low-volume or one-off bodywork for many Italian automakers as well as racing teams and individuals. C.S.C. customers included Scuderia Ferrari, Giotto Bizzarrini, Iso, Scuderia Serenissima, ASA, NART, Ecurie Francorchamps and others.

During 1966 and 1967, Carrozzeria Sports Cars worked in close collaboration with Scuderia Ferrari to produce bodies for several racing cars. C.S.C had previously been contracted by Scuderia Ferrari to modify the noses of several 250 LMs as an aerodynamic improvement for the 1965 racing season. Beginning in 1966, this working relationship was deepened as C.S.C. craftsmen were hired to produce bodies for the 330 P3, 330 P4, Dino 206 S and 365 P2/3 racing sports cars. According to ex-Ferrari engineer Giacomo Caliri, these bodies were designed by Ferrari engineer Edmondo Casoli and aerodynamic specialist Caliri. They were then built by C.S.C. employees Otello Benedetti, Edmondo Meletti and Mario Allegretti, working on-site at the Scuderia Ferrari workshops. In June 1967, Casoli was transferred to the Ferrari technical office for production cars and Caliri became lead designer of racing sports car bodies. At Caliri's suggestion, the C.S.C. employees were hired directly by Ferrari and C.S.C.'s business relationship with Scuderia Ferrari ended.

=== Staff ===
Piero Drogo was the most well-known member of Carrozzeria Sports Cars, with his name often used as a synonym for the company (e.g. "Drogo-bodied"). While multiple other partners and employees joined and left C.S.C, Drogo was part of the company from 1960 until its bankruptcy in 1971. From the beginning of Carrozzeria Sports Cars, Piero Drogo's role was primarily in managing business operations. His duties included sales, public relations and administration. Although C.S.C-designed cars are sometimes described as designed or bodied by Drogo, he was not an auto body craftsman nor was he an automobile designer. It is a common misconception that Drogo designed automobile bodies. In his role as the manager of C.S.C., Drogo became well known in Modena and used his contacts in the racing world to attract business. Because of his status as the public face of the company, C.S.C. became commonly referred to as "Drogo" by customers and associates.

Drogo's initial partners in C.S.C. were Lino Marchesini and Celso Cavalieri, both skilled auto body craftsmen whose pre-existing company was the basis for the formation of C.S.C. Marchesini was previously employed by Scaglietti. Celso Cavalieri was a co-owner of the company from the founding until 1963. Following Cavalieri's departure in 1963, Drogo and Marchesini were joined by Otello Benedetti (ex-Scuderia Ferrari), Mario Allegretti (ex-Reparto Corse Maserati) and Egidio Bonfatti (ex-Carrozzeria Mariani), all of whom had stakes as financial partners in the company. Marchesini left the company in 1969, followed by Benedetti in 1970.

Other Carrozzeria Sports Cars employees included Franco Bacchelli, Roberto Villa, Darles Bussetti, Elis Garuti, Walter Giusti, Ivano Ferri, and Edmondo Meletti.

== Design and fabrication methods ==
The portfolio of car body designs produced by Carrozzeria Sports Cars cannot be attributed to a single person. While some sources attribute the designs to Piero Drogo, he was not a skilled body fabricator or designer. It is likely that the craftspeople employed by the carrozzeria had equal or greater influence to Drogo on the original designs produced by the carrozzeria. It was common practice among small auto body manufacturers during the period to work out design details "by hand" during the fabrication process. For many designs executed this way, the end product was the result of collaboration and improvisation during the fabrication process, without an individual designer or fixed schematic. Many of the C.S.C. original designs borrowed design elements from other vehicles such as the Ferrari 250 GTO and 250 LM, synthesizing these various inspirations in order to improve aerodynamic performance and satisfy their clients' aesthetic sensibilities.

In addition to these original designs, many C.S.C. bodies were designed by clients and made to order, such as the Scuderia Ferrari-designed 330 P4 and Giotto Bizzarrini's Iso A3C and 250 GT SWB Breadvan. These designs could vary widely in style. For example, the angular bodies that Mario Tadini designed for a 250 GT SWB and a Jaguar E-type contrast sharply with the curvaceous Ferrari-designed racing cars, even though both were built by C.S.C. craftsmen.

All automobile bodies constructed by Carrozzeria Sports Cars were fabricated using to the traditional, handmade techniques that were common in small Modenese carrozzeria from the post-WWII period through the 1960s. At the beginning of the fabrication process, the workshop constructed full-size wire framework in the shape of the body to be built, called a filon or manichein. This was used as the reference for the final design, and often replaced any schematics or models for those bodies designed in-house. Body panels were then individually cut and shaped using hand tools and shears, benders, rollers and mechanical hammers. Once the panel shape matched the filon, it was then attached to other panels/framework and the chassis, via welding, rivets or other mechanical fasteners. This extremely labor-intensive method required an average of 40-50 working hours to complete one body. As labor costs rose, C.S.C. and many other small auto body manufacturers closed as it was no longer economical to construct bodies in this manner.

== Notable cars ==
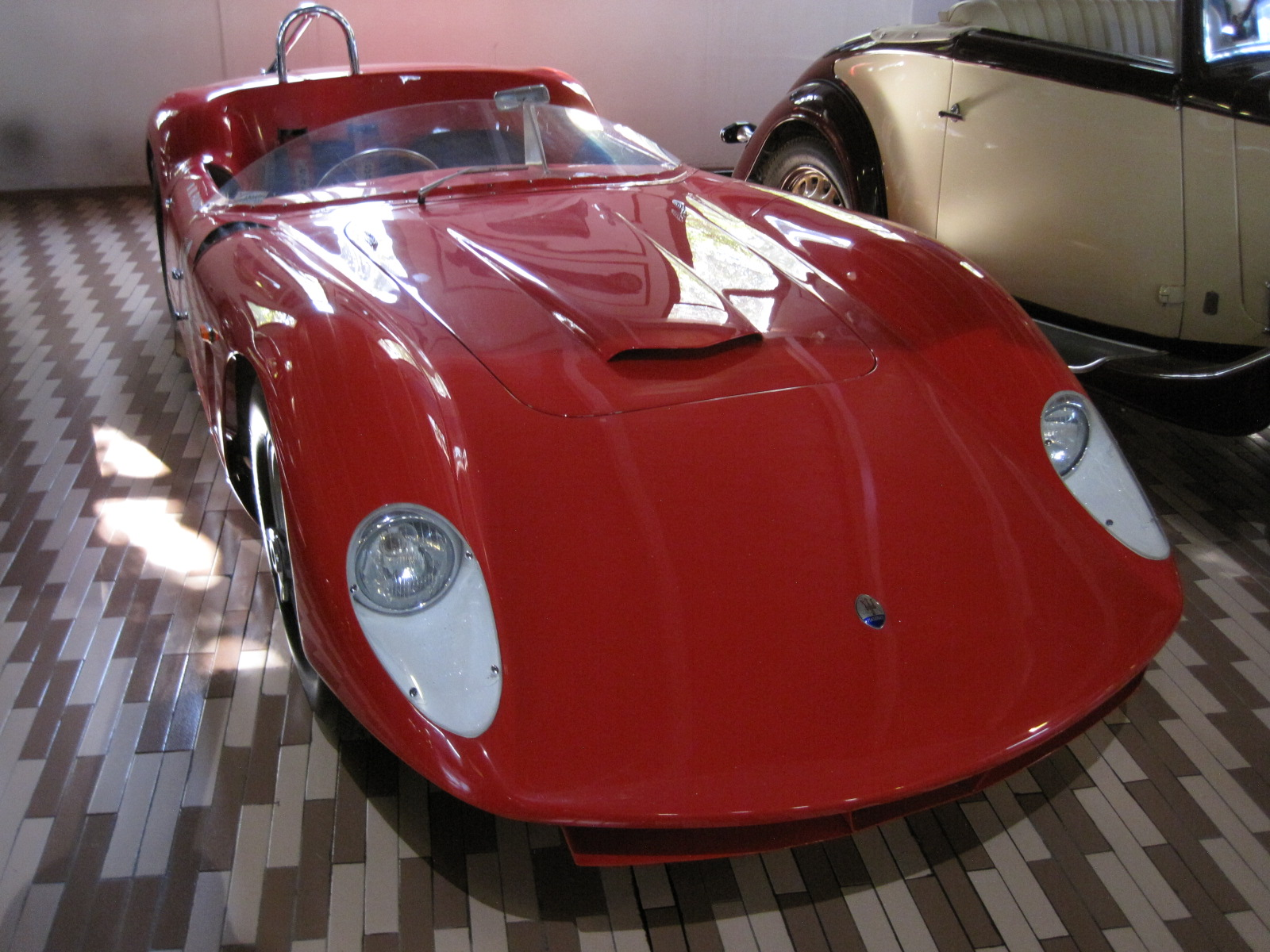
1961 Maserati Tipo 61 "C.D.M." with body by Carrozzeria Sports Cars

According to historians Jack Koobs de Hartog and Marc de Rijck, Carrozzeria Sports Cars produced approximately 110 bodies, including over 50 unique body styles. The following list includes both bodies designed and built by Carrozzeria Sports Cars and bodies constructed by C.S.C. according to third-party designs.

- Aguzzoli Condor MK1
- ASA 1000 GTC
- ASA 411 GTS
- ASA F3 (single seater Formula Three race car)
- Bizzarrini P538
- Cammarota, Volpini and PM Poggi Formula Junior race cars (all built in 1961)
- Cegga Cooper Monaco/P4 (with Ferrari V12 engine)
- Cegga Ferrari Berlinetta (based on a 250 GTE chassis)
- Cegga Maserati P69
- De Sanctis 1000SP
- Dino 166 P/206 SP
- Dino 206 S
- Ferrari 250 LM (approximately 11 existing bodies modified with longer nose)
- Ferrari 365 P2/3 and 365 P2/4
- Ferrari 330 P3
- Ferrari 330 P4
- Ferrari 412 P
- Ferrari 250 GT SWB Breadvan (1962)
- Multiple Ferrari 250 GT chassis rebodied (including 0707GT (currently installed on 0885GT), 0977GT, 1717GT, 2053GT, 2735GT, 2445GT)
- Ferrari 250 GTO chassis 3445GT
- Ferrari 250 TR chassis 0716TR and 0738TR
- Ferrari 330 GT 2+2 'Navarro', designed by Adolfo Melchionda
- Iso Grifo A3C
- Rebodied Jaguar E-type designed by Mario Tadini
- Maserati Tipo 61 "C.D.M." (Cavalieri Drogo Maserati, 1962)
- Maserati Tipo 151/3
- Porsche 550 Spyder special for Pierre de Siebenthal
- Thomassima II
