= Covilhã International Hill Climb =

Annual automobile hillclimb in Portugal

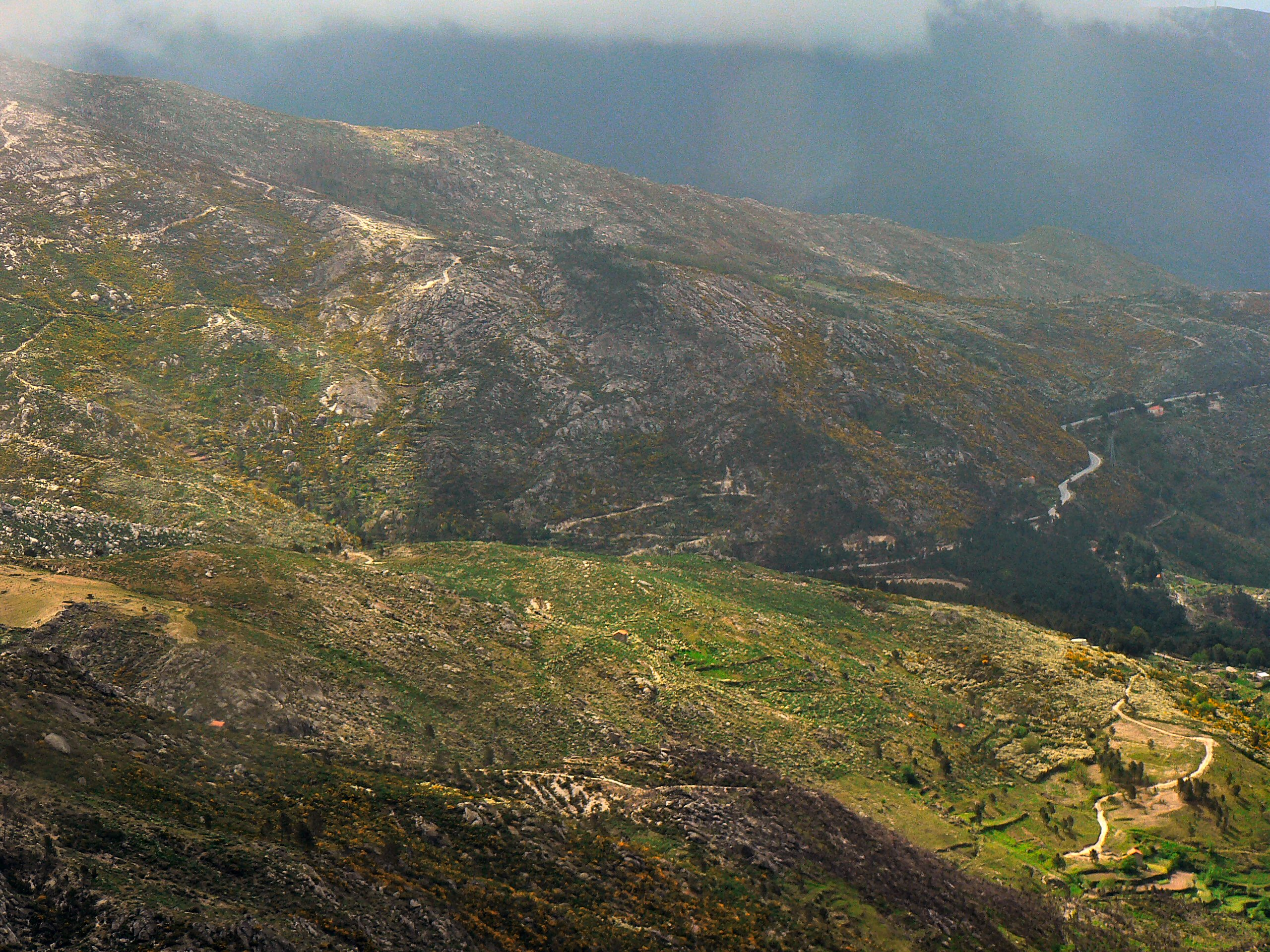
- Location: Covilhã, Portugal
- First race: 1976
- Distance: 5240 m (2018- ), 4910 m (2014-2017), 5010 m (1976-2013)
- Laps: 2
- Previous names: Serra da Estrela Hill Climb
- Most wins (driver): (Italy) Simone Faggioli (5)

Circuit information
- Surface: Tarmac
- Lap record: 2:28.839 (5010m) ( (Italy) Simone Faggioli, Osella FA 30, 2009, Cat. III (sportscars))

The Covilhã International Hill Climb, is an annual automobile hillclimb to the summit in Serra da Estrela in Covilhã, Portugal. The track measures 5,240 kilometres (3,260 mi), climbing 454 m (1,490 ft) from the start at km 31.810 on EN 339 (846 m above sea level), to the finish at km 26.570 (1300 m above the sea level), on grades averaging 9,12%.

The above paragraph uses continental not english numeric conventions and need correction

The race was on the FIA FIA International Hill Climb Cup Events Calendar and features on Portugal National Hill Climb Championships. It has taken place since 1976. It is currently contested by a variety of classes of cars, (touring cars, sportscars, single-seater).

The current record was set in 2009 by the Italian driver Simone Faggioli, on the wheel of an Osella FA 30, with the time of 2:58.839.

== Winners ==
Edition	Year	Driver	Car	Time
1st	1976	Mauro Nesti	Lola Chevron	6m 17.28s
2nd	1977	Mauro Nesti	Lola T294	6m 05.77s
3rd	1978	Jean Marie Almeras	Porsche 935 T	6m 26.90s
4th	1979	Mauro Nesti	Lola T297	7m 03.87s
5th	1980	Michel Pignard	Toj BMW	5m 56.63s
6th	1981	Jean Louis Bos	Lola	6m 05.77s
7th	1983	Mauro Nesti	Osella BMW	n.a.
8th	1999	Pedro Matos Chaves	Toyota Corolla WRC	4m 54.089s
9th	2000	Carlos Rodrigues	Porsche 911 RSR	4m 31.483s
10th	2001	Manuel Ferreira da Silva	Ford Escort RS Cosworth	6m 24.706s
11th	2002	Franz Tschager	Osella PA 20S	5m 11.195s
12th	2003	Simone Faggioli	Osella BMW	5m 10.725s
13th	2004	Andrea de Blagi	Osella PA 21S	5m 17.953s
14th	2005	Simone Faggioli	Osella PA 21S	5m 12.768s
15th	2006	Giulio Regosa	Lola F3000	5m 17.586s
16th	2007	Andrés Vilariño	Reynard F3000 E2	5m 29.082s
17th	2008	Lionel Régal	Reynard Oil	5m 00.635s
18th	2009	Simone Faggioli	Osella FA 30	4m 59.731s
19th	2010	Simone Faggioli	Osella FA 30	5m 18.144s
20th	2013	Tiago Reis	Norma M20F	5m 32.233s
21st	2014	Pedro Salvador	Tatuus PY012	5m 22.241s
22nd	2015	João Fonseca	Norma M20FC	5m 36.303s
23rd	2016	Pedro Salvador	Norma M20FC	5m 24.132s
24th	2017	Rui Ramalho	Osella PA2000 E2	5m 12.083s
25th	2018	Rui Ramalho	Osella PA2000 E2	5m 39.754s

Internacional Event

== See also ==
- European Hill Climb Championship
- Hillclimbing
- Mont Ventoux Hill Climb
- Pikes Peak International Hill Climb
