= Piero Drogo =

Italian racing driver (1926–1973)

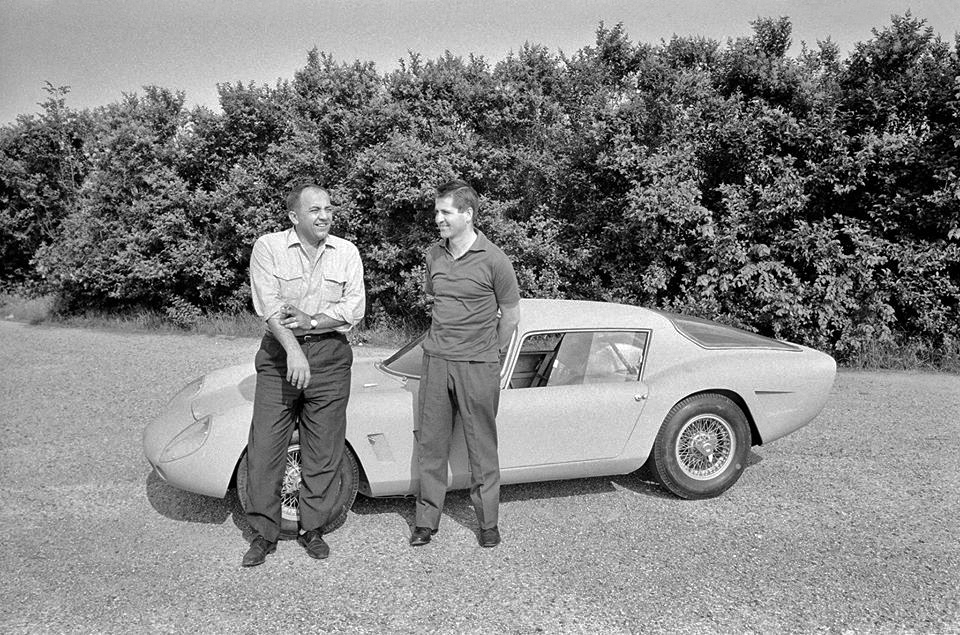
- Drogo (left) with Giotto Bizzarrini in early 1960s. They together created the ASA 1000 GTC (behind)
- Born: 8 August 1926; Vignale Monferrato, Alessandria, Italy
- Died: 28 April 1973 (aged 46); Bologna, Italy

Formula One World Championship career
- Nationality: (Italy) Italian
- Active years: 1960
- Team: privateer Cooper
- Entries: 1
- Championships: 0
- Wins: 0
- Podiums: 0
- Career points: 0
- Pole positions: 0
- Fastest laps: 0
- First entry: 1960 Italian Grand Prix

Piero Drogo (born in Vignale Monferrato, Alessandria, 8 August 1926 – died in Bologna, 28 April 1973) was a racing driver and coachbuilder from Italy. He participated in one Formula One Grand Prix, debuting at the 1960 Italian Grand Prix. He moved on to form a carrozzeria in Modena to service the thriving sports car industry there. His Carrozzeria Sports Cars gained some fame later in the decade. He died in a car accident aged 46.

== Early life ==
Piero Drogo was born in Vignale Monferrato on 8 August 1926 to father Luigi Drogo and mother Rosina Monzeglio. His parents were farmers. Before or immediately after World War II he moved to Venezuela, along with members of his family. While in Venezuela, he began his career as a sports car racing driver. His first recorded result was at the 1956 Premio Nacional Ciudad de Maracay in Venezuela, where he placed first overall driving a Mercedes-Benz 300 SL.

In 1958, Drogo returned to Italy and began living in Modena, where he would remain for the rest of his life. In the late 1950s, he worked as a racing mechanic for Stanguellini to support his racing career.

Drogo married Anna Pia Fornaciari, a nurse from Modena, on 5 December 1959.

== Racing career ==
The first known record of Drogo's racing career is a first-place finish in the 1956 Premio Nacional Ciudad de Maracay, although this may not have been the first event in which he participated. Drogo's racing career included numerous regional sports car races in Latin America, as well as international races such as the 1958 24 Hours of Le Mans and the 1959 Targa Florio. He also drove in the 1960 Formula One season, including an 8th-place finish at the 1960 Italian Grand Prix as well as several non-championship races. He scored no Formula One championship points.

=== Sports car racing results ===
Unless otherwise cited, all results below are cited from Koobs de Hartog and De Rijck, 2015.

(key)

Season	Series	Position	Team	Car
1956	Premio Nacional Ciudad de Maracay, Venezuela	1st OA	Club Automovil de Venezuela	Mercedes-Benz 300 SL
	Copa Rio Guayas, Ecuador	2nd OA, 1st IC		Mercedes-Benz 300 SL
	Gran Premio de Venezuela for Sports Cars at Caracas	8th OA, 4th IC	Scuderia Madunina Venezuela	Ferrari 625LM Touring
1957	1000 km Buenos Aires	7th OA, 1st IC	Scuderia Madunina Venezuela	Ferrari 500 TR
	Cuban Grand Prix	7th OA	Scuderia Madunina Venezuela	Ferrari 500 TR
	Grand Premio de Venezuela	8th OA, 2nd IC	Scuderia Madunina Venezuela	Ferrari 500 TR
1958	1000 km Buenos Aires	4th OA	Scuderia Madunina Venezuela	Ferrari 250 TR
	Cuban Grand Prix	12th OA		Ferrari 250 TR
	Maiquetia – Pedro Garcia hill climb, Venezuela	19th OA, 1st IC		Volvo PV444
	24h of Le Mans	Ret	Fernand Tavano	Ferrari 250 TR
	XII Circuito Internacional de Vila Real, Portugal	Ret	Piero Drogo	Ferrari 250 TR
1959	Targa Florio	5th OA	Scuderia Centro Sud	Maserati A6G
	Grand Prix of Pergusa	3rd OA	Scuderia Centro Sud	Maserati A6G
	Circuito di Caserta	5th OA	Scuderia Centro Sud	Maserati A6G
	Grand Prix of Messina	Ret	Scuderia Centro Sud	Maserati A6G

=== Complete Formula One results ===
(key)

Year	Entrant	Chassis	Engine	1	2	3	4	5	6	7	8	9	10	WDC	Points
1960	Scuderia Colonia	Cooper T43	Climax Straight-4	ARG	MON	500	NED	BEL	FRA	GBR	POR	ITA; 8	USA	NC	0

== Carrozzeria Sports Cars ==
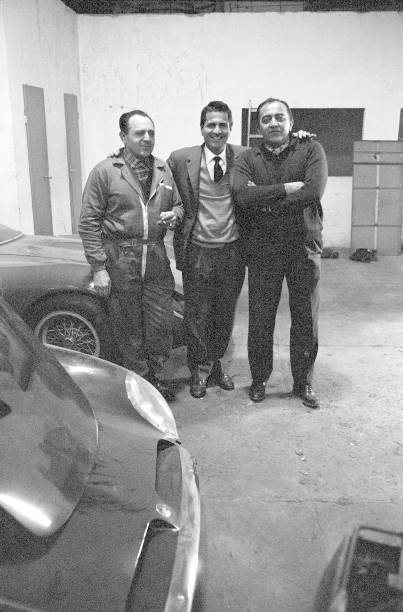
Drogo at right with Giotto Bizzarrini in the middle on 1 December 1964 with the Iso AC/3.

In 1960, Drogo entered into a partnership in the carrozzeria "Marchesini & Cavalieri S.d.f" alongside Lino Marchesini and Celso Cavalieri. This business would become commonly known as Carrozzeria Sports Cars, although it operated under several legal names during its existence. C.S.C. operated from 1960 to late 1971, during which time the company produced low-volume or one-off bodywork for many Italian automakers as well as racing teams and individuals. C.S.C. customers included Scuderia Ferrari, Giotto Bizzarrini, Iso, Scuderia Serenissma, ASA, NART, Ecurie Francorchamps and others.

From the beginning of Carrozzeria Sports Cars, Drogo's role was primarily in managing business operations. His duties included sales, public relations and administration. Although the name "Drogo" is often used as a synonym for the designs of C.S.C., Drogo did not practice the craft of coachbuilding nor was he an automobile designer. It is a common misconception that Drogo designed automobile bodies - in fact, the design work was carried out by C.S.C. workers during the fabrication process, often in collaboration with the customer. No single person was responsible for the automobile designs produced by C.S.C. In his role as the manager of C.S.C., Drogo became well known in Modena and used his contacts in the racing world to attract business. While multiple other partners joined and left C.S.C, Drogo's presence was a constant from 1960 until the company's bankruptcy in 1971.

By 1971, Carrozzeria Sports Cars was facing financial difficulties. In June 1971, Drogo published an editorial in the magazine Autosprint titled "Modena S.O.S.", which appealed to private and/or public investment to assist C.S.C. and other small Modenese manufacturers facing similar economic troubles. Drogo's efforts to save the business were ultimately unsuccessful and C.S.C. declared bankruptcy on 31 December 1971.

== Later life ==
In 1972, Drogo opened a dealership under the name "Sports Cars S.a.s. di Drogo & Vassallo", selling Ferrari, Maserati, Lamborghini, Porsche and De Tomaso automobiles. This was located on the former premises of Carrozzeria Sports Cars and shared premises with "Carrozzeria ABS", which was founded by former C.S.C. employees. In this way, Drogo maintained some continuity of business operations despite the bankruptcy of C.S.C.

Drogo died on 28 April 1973, at the age of 46, in an automobile accident. He collided with a truck while driving through a dark tunnel near Bologna. A lengthy obituary by journalist Mario Morselli was published in Autosprint.

Drogo's widow, Anna Pia Fornaciari, would later marry Lamborghini test driver and development engineer Bob Wallace.

== See also ==
- Ferrari 250 GT SWB Breadvan
