= Giotto Bizzarrini =

Italian automobile engineer (1926–2023)

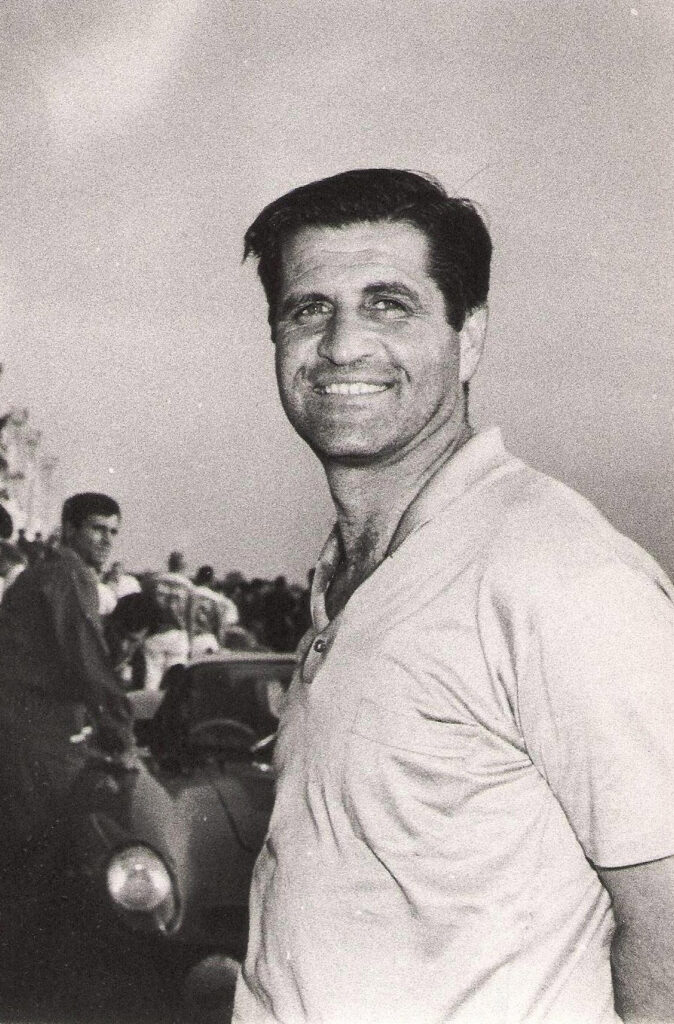
- Bizzarrini in 1966
- Born: June 6, 1926; Quercianella, Tuscany, Italy
- Died: May 13, 2023 (aged 96)
- Education: University of Pisa
- Known for: Founder of Bizzarrini

Giotto Bizzarrini (6 June 1926 – 13 May 2023) was an Italian automobile engineer who was active from the 1950s through the 1970s.

After graduating from the University of Pisa in 1953, Bizzarrini eventually joined Alfa Romeo as a test driver. He gained a reputation for identifying and solving problems and was head hunted by Ferrari in 1957. Bizzarrini's responsibility increased until he became sports car development chief at Ferrari in the late 1950s, working on such notable projects as the Ferrari 250 GTO. He split from the company as part of the 'Great Walkout' in 1961, worked first with ATS, and then in 1962 started his own company, Società Autostar, whose name was changed to Bizzarrini in 1964. In addition to producing the exotic Bizzarrini 5300 GT, Bizzarrini also worked for other makers including Iso, Lamborghini, and Alfa Romeo. Several concept cars in the 2000s bear his name.

== Early life ==
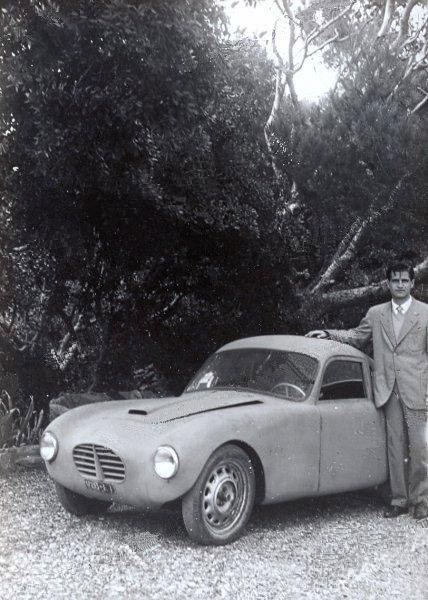
Bizzarrini around 1953 when he was a student at University of Pisa, with the Fiat 500 “Macchinetta”" he made.

Bizzarrini was born in Quercianella, Livorno Province, the son of a rich landowner from Livorno. His grandfather, also named Giotto Bizzarrini, was a biologist who had worked with Guglielmo Marconi on his inventions, especially the radio, following which one of the Livorno Library sections was named The Bizzarrini Library.

Bizzarrini received an engineering degree from the University of Pisa in 1953. His design thesis in his senior year was a complete redesign of a used Fiat Topolino, in which he modified the engine for increased power and relocated it in the chassis for improved handling.

== Alfa Romeo ==
After graduation, he taught briefly before joining Alfa Romeo's 'Servizio Esperimenze Principali' unit under Ing. Nicolis in August 1954. He was assigned to the development of the Alfa Romeo Giulietta chassis, which was disappointing, as he aspired to become a powerplant engineer. He was later able to move to the Experimental Department, receiving on-the-job training to become a test driver. In his words: "I became a test driver who coincidentally was also an engineer, with mathematical principles. I always needed to know why something fails, so I can invent a solution."

== Ferrari ==
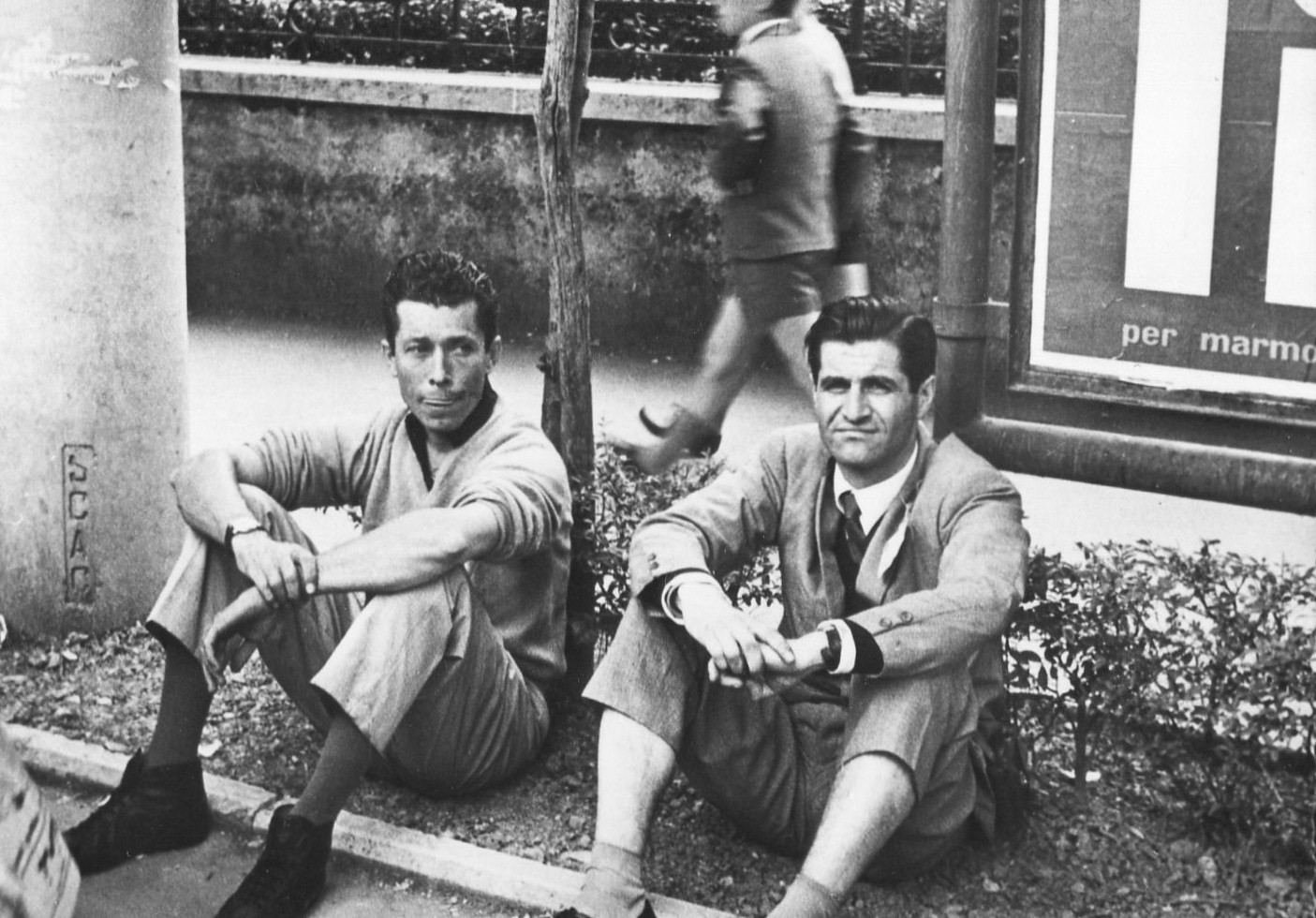
Bizzarrini with Ferrari racecar driver Olivier Gendebien around 1961.

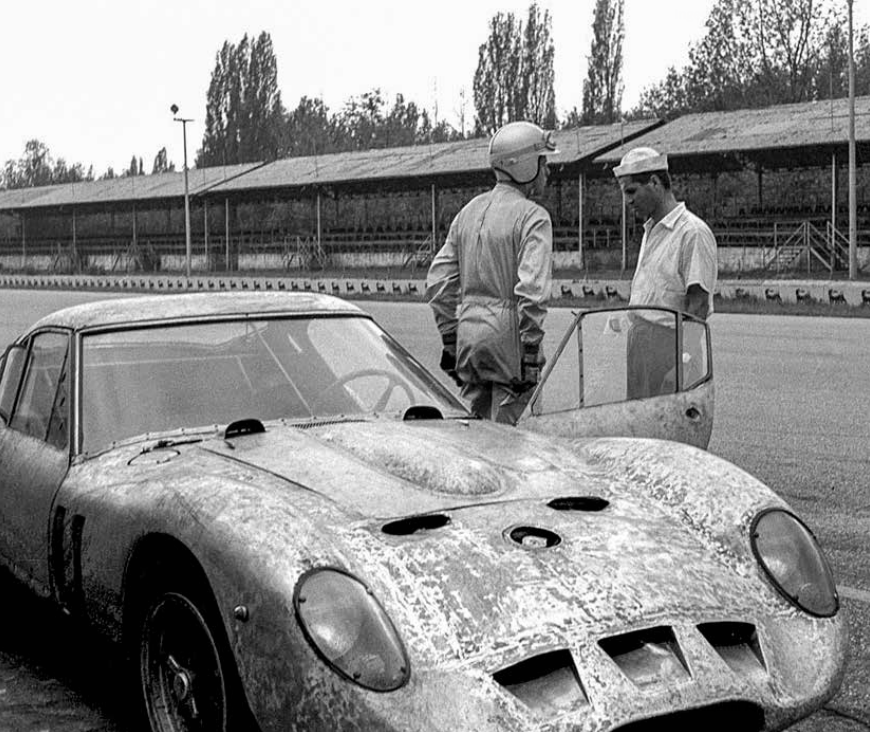
Bizzarrini at right in white hat, with Willy Mairesse when testing the 250 GTO Prototype at Autodromo Nazionale Monza in 1961.

Bizzarrini left Alfa Romeo in 1957 and went to Ferrari when that company needed a test driver. He was quickly promoted to controller of experimental, Sports and GT car development.

Bizzarrini worked for five years at Ferrari as chief engineer. He also worked as a developer, designer, and skilled test driver. The 250 GT 2+2/GTE, the 3 litre Testa Rossa V12 engine, the 250 TR Testa Rossa, and the 250GT SWB (Short Wheelsbase Berlinetta or Berlinetta Passo Corto) were influenced by his ideas and technical solutions. For one of the most successful Ferrari racing series, the 250, Bizzarrini worked hard to develop the chassis, engines, and advanced dynamic solutions.

=== Ferrari 250 GTO ===
His work at Ferrari included the 1962 250 GTO. He became involved with the project in 1960. Ferrari wanted a GT racer with better aerodynamics than the previous 250 GT SWB. The SWB was a great racer but had considerable aerodynamic drag. Jaguar had just launched the E-Type and Ferrari needed a top contender in the tracks. Enzo Ferrari wanted to ensure that his racing team did not suffer another loss as it had in the 1959 LeMans race.

Tests started secretly with either a 250 GT SWB Berlinetta, with chassis number #2053GT, or a by Boano-bodied #0523GT 250 GT Coupé which is believed to have been Bizzarrini's personal car. This car was developed and was used as a test mule for technical solutions later seen in the GTO. This car was known as the Bizzarrini Ugly Duck. (He said, "We dubbed the car Il Mostro." 'The Monster') Experiments with the SWB chassis indicated considerable speed loss due to aerodynamic drag, so Bizzarrini reduced the frontal area and increased the bonnet length, to reduce both drag and tendency to front lift at high speeds. Bizzarrini moved the engine well back into the chassis and lowered it (by using a dry sump lubrication system) to improve weight distribution and handling. The result was the 250 GTO.

== Count Volpi, the specials, ASA and ATS ==
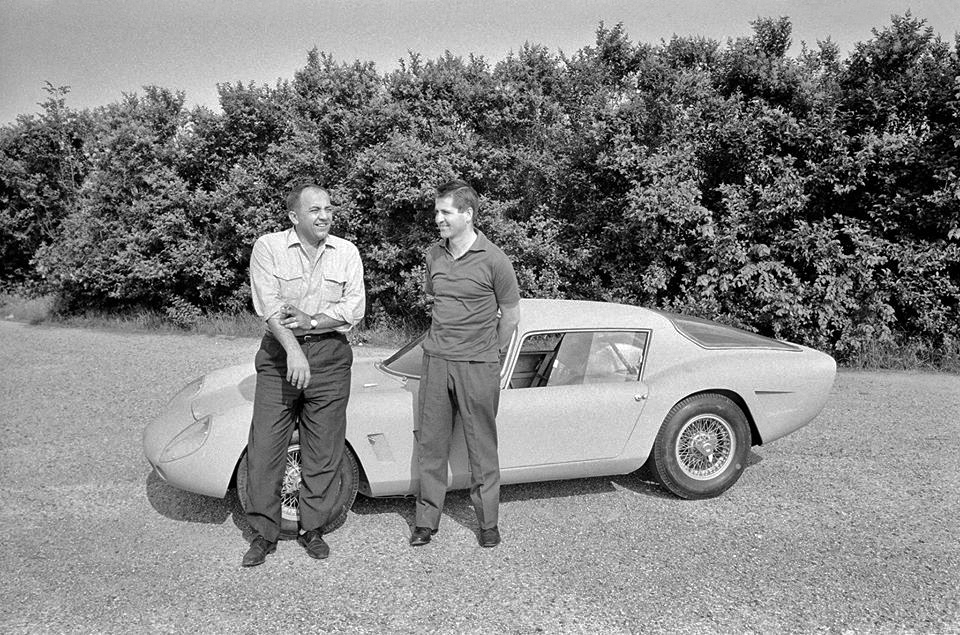
Bizzarrini and Piero Drogo with the ASA 1000 GTC in 1962

In 1961, Bizzarrini was one of the "famous five" engineers who left Ferrari in the so-called "Ferrari night of the Long Knives", provoked by a reorganisation of the engineering staff. With other ex-Ferrari engineers (including Carlo Chiti) Bizzarrini founded the Automobili Turismo e Sport (ATS) company to build a Formula 1 single seater and a GT sports car, the ATS Serenissima.

In 1962, Bizzarrini was hired by Count Giovanni Volpi, owner of the Scuderia Serenissima Republica di Venezia, to upgrade a Ferrari 250 GT SWB (chassis number 2819GT) to GTO specification. Ferrari was upset with Volpi and refused to sell him a GTO, so they had to acquire and modify a used vehicle.

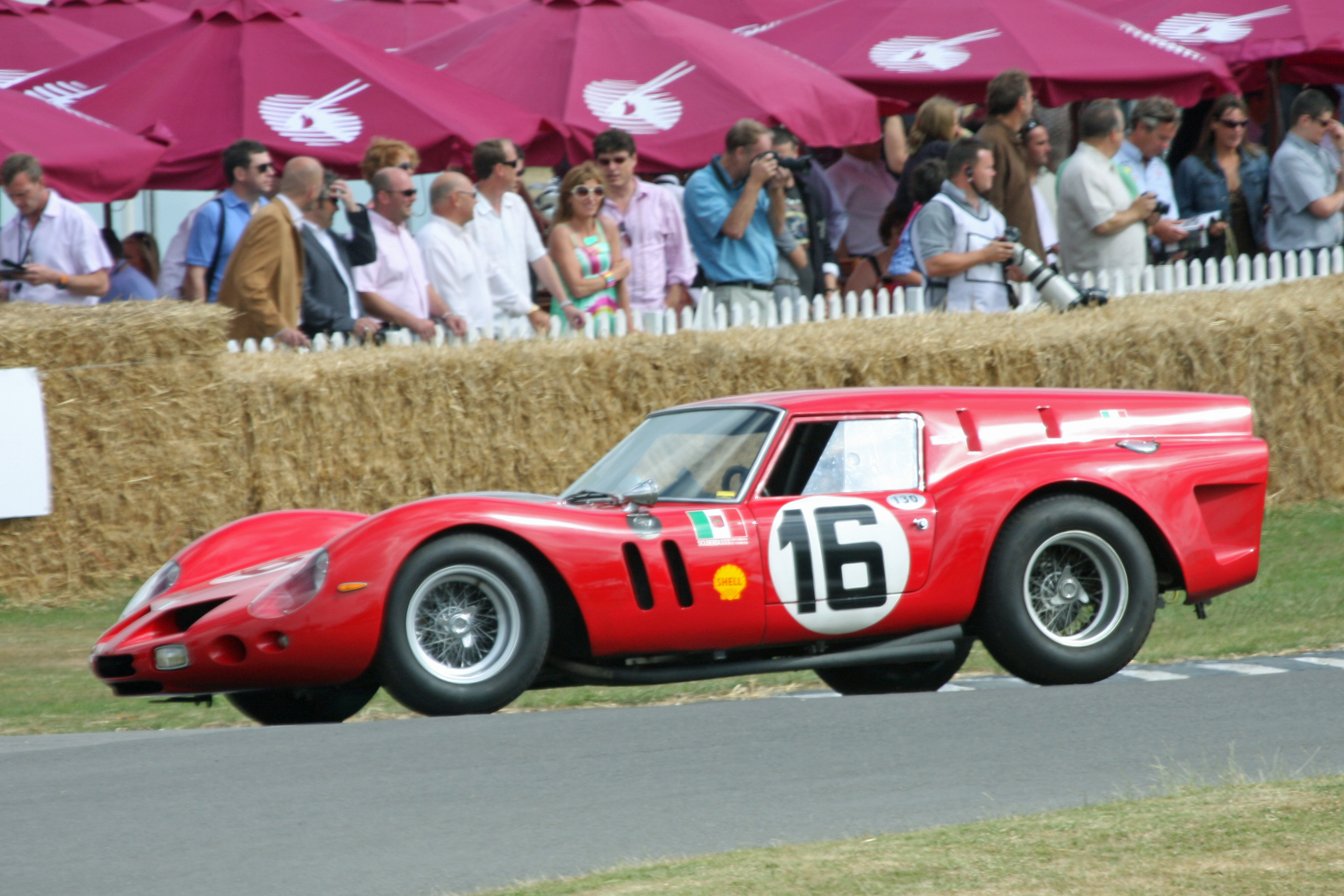
Ferrari 250GT Drogo #2819GT "Breadvan"

Bizzarrini applied all the ideas from the GTO and developed with Piero Drogo of Carrozzeria Sports Cars in the Modena works an aerodynamically advanced body, even lower than the GTO, with the roof line dramatically extended to the rear end, then abruptly truncated following the Kamm aerodynamic theory. The car was completed in just 14 days. The mechanicals were extensively reformed and the engine set well back into the chassis and lowered, using dry-sump lubrication. This car, chassis number #2819GT was called the Ferrari Breadvan, and is currently raced in vintage Sport Car events. The car was raced at the time with some success, with Carlo Abate and other drivers at the wheel, but could not beat the GTOs because it still had the four-speed gearbox. At least another two 250GT series cars were developed by Bizzarrini, Piero Drogo, and Neri and Bonacini to GTO specifications and received distinctive bodies with similar advanced shapes.

In 1962 Bizzarrini founded Società Autostar, an engineering firm through which he would bid for freelance engineering projects.

== Lamborghini engine ==
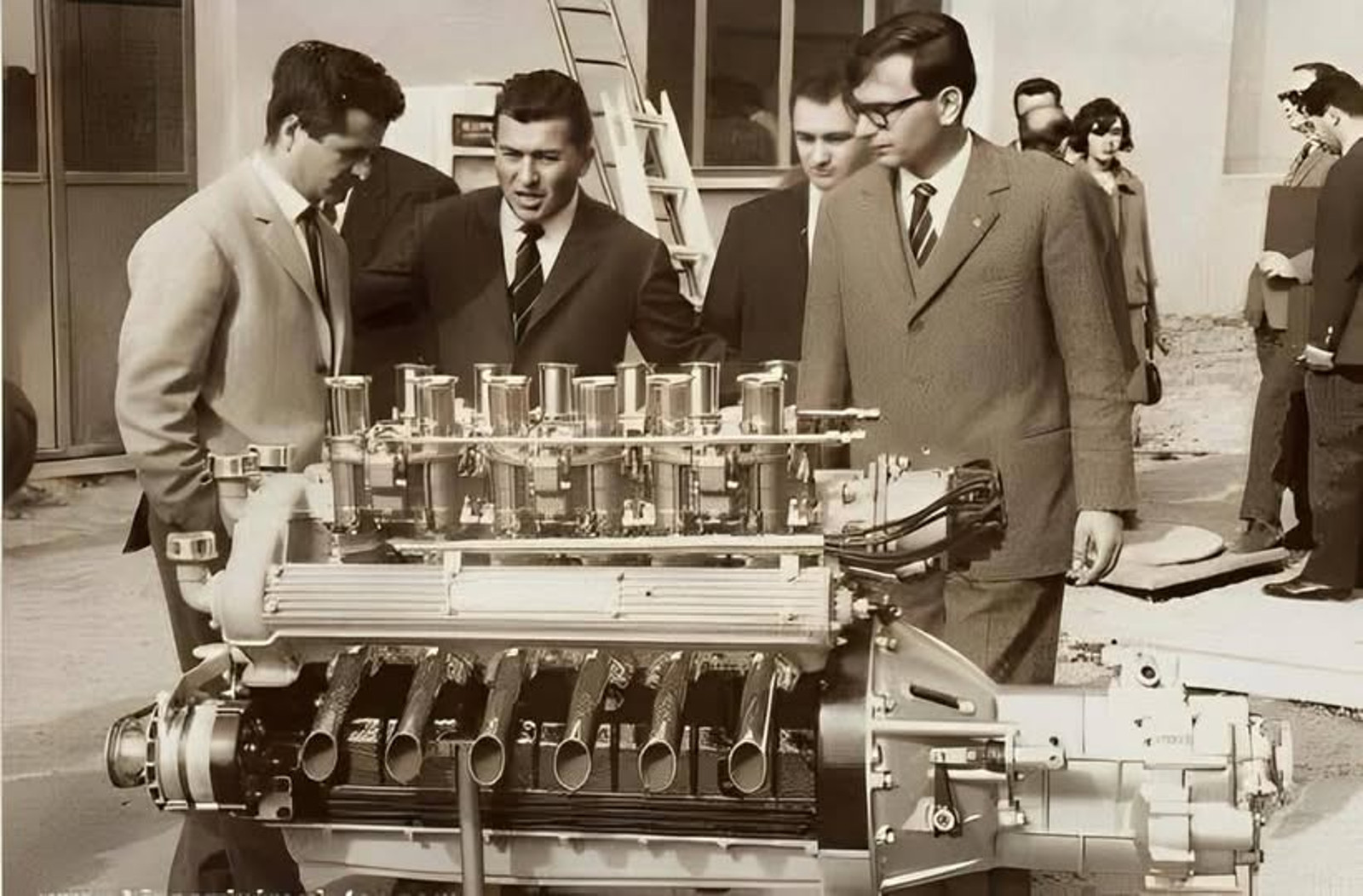
Bizzarrini (left) with Ferruccio Lamborghini (center) and Giampaolo Dallara (right) in 1963

Ferruccio Lamborghini commissioned Società Autostar to design an engine for his automaking firm, Lamborghini's, new GT cars. The Lamborghini V12 was first manufactured for use in the 350GT in 1964. Variations of the basic design were used in every V-12 Lamborghini until 2010. Originally displacing 3,464 cc (211 cu in) in the 350GT, it had been increased in displacement to 6,496 cc (396 cu in) in the Murciélago SV.

== Iso Autoveicoli S.p.A. ==
=== Iso Grifo ===
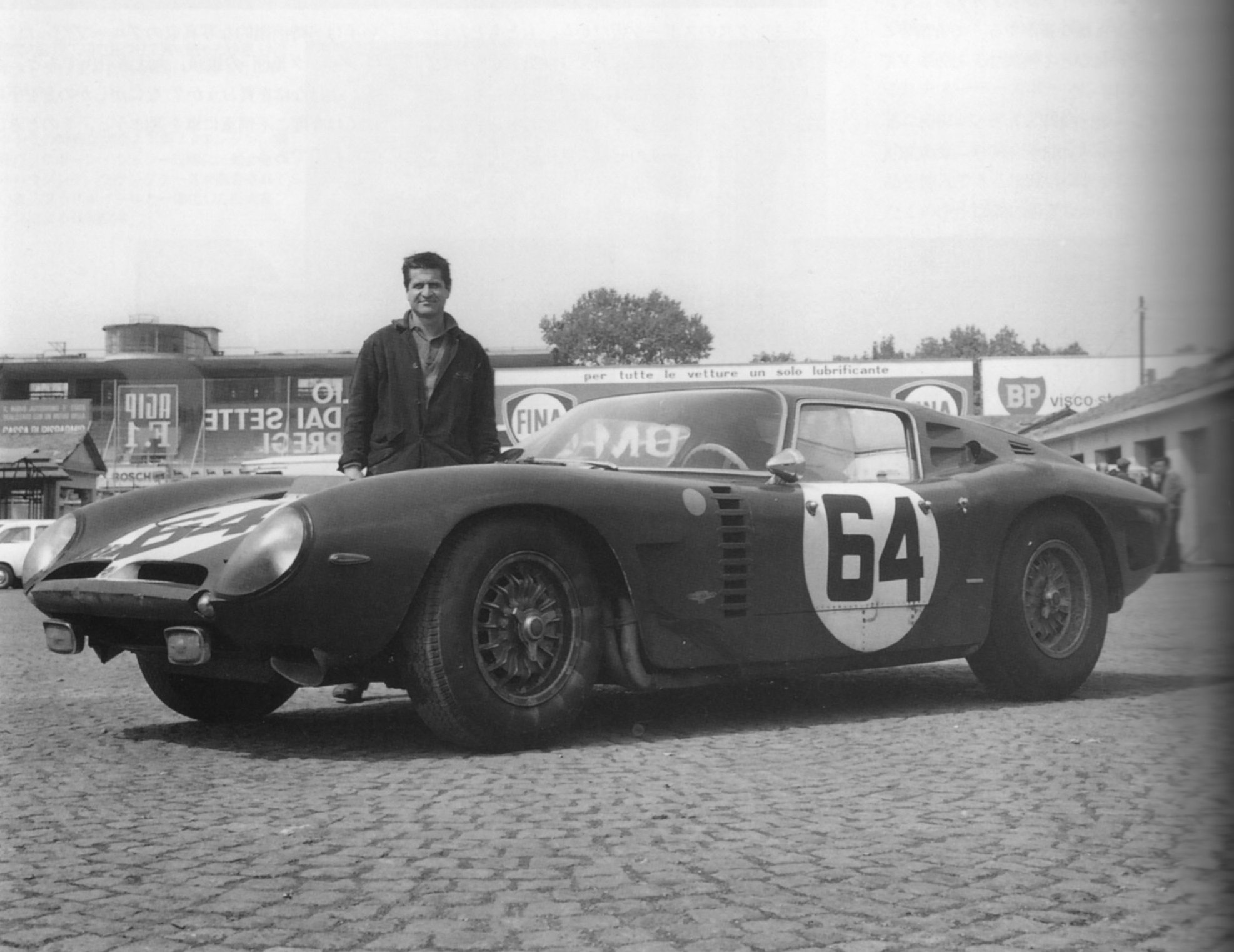
Bizzarrini with the Iso Grifo A3C at Autodromo Nazionale Monza on 25 April 1965

Società Autostar developed cars for Iso Autoveicoli S.p.A. including the Iso Rivolta IR 300 and the Iso Grifo.

A dispute between Bizzarrini and Iso ended their collaboration and led to Società Autostar building variants of the Iso Grifo under the Bizzarrini marque. This led Bizzarrini to change the name of Società Autostar first, in 1964, to Società Prototipi Bizzarrini and then in 1966 to Bizzarrini SpA.

== Bizzarrini SpA ==
=== 5300 GT Strada ===
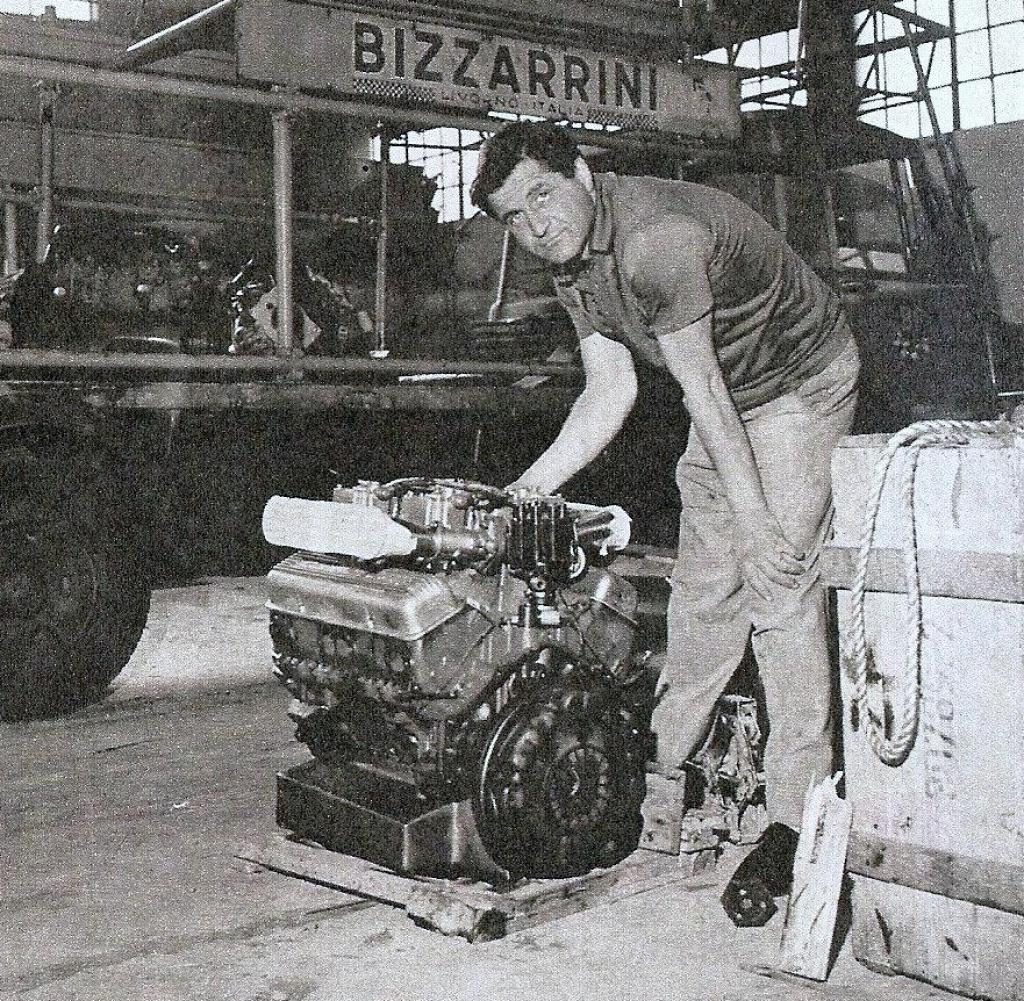
Bizzarrini with the Chevy engine used for the Bizzarrini 5300 GT

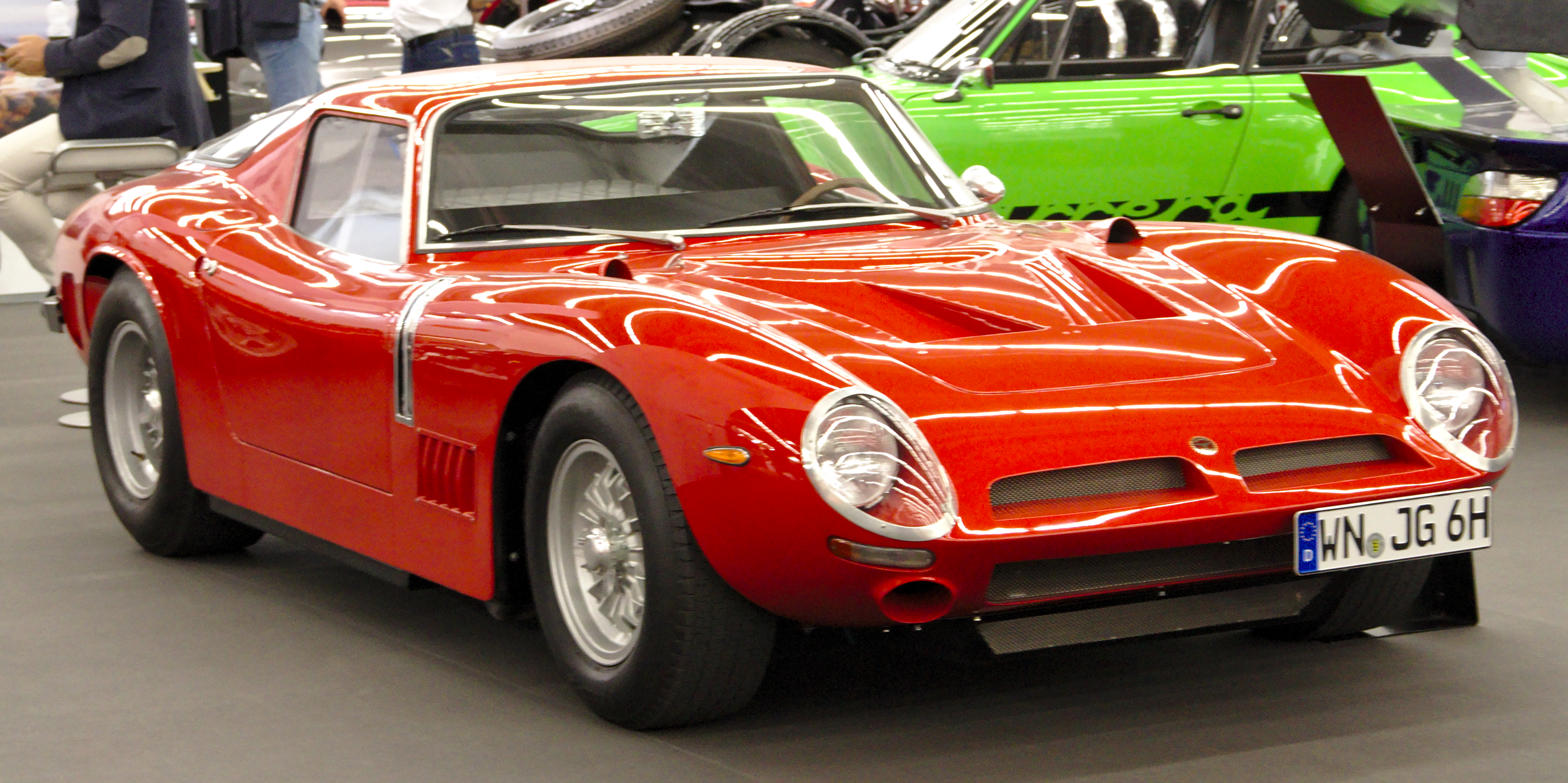
Bizzarrini 5300 GT Strada

Bizzarrini SpA is best known for the Bizzarrini 5300 GT Strada, produced between 1965 and 1968. This car had styling from Giorgetto Giugiaro when he was working for Bertone.

Giugiaro's Italdesign was founded on 13 February 1968, with a forty-day target to build their first design based on the Bizzarrini Grifo racing car with a deadline date for the Turin Motor Show in April. Giugiaro's Manta prototype caused a sensation and successfully launched the company.

After Bizzarrini SpA, Giotto Bizzarrini also developed advanced designs for other companies, including American Motors for which he built prototypes for the AMX/3 project, and as style and technical consultant for General Motors in Europe and USA, top Japanese motorcycle marques, and well-known designer marques such as Pininfarina.

== Bizzarrini in later years ==
Bizzarrini taught and worked at Rome University, developing advanced projects and designing, building, and developing his own sport cars. He was often quoted as saying: "I'm not a car designer, I am a worker". In 1982 he built the last 250 GTO in history with chassis number 3131.

On 23 October 2012, during the inauguration of the University of Florence's new Design Campus in Calenzano, Professor Bizzarrini was given the Honoris Causa Degree in Industrial Design.

Bizzarrini died on 13 May 2023, at the age of 96.
