= Lučine =

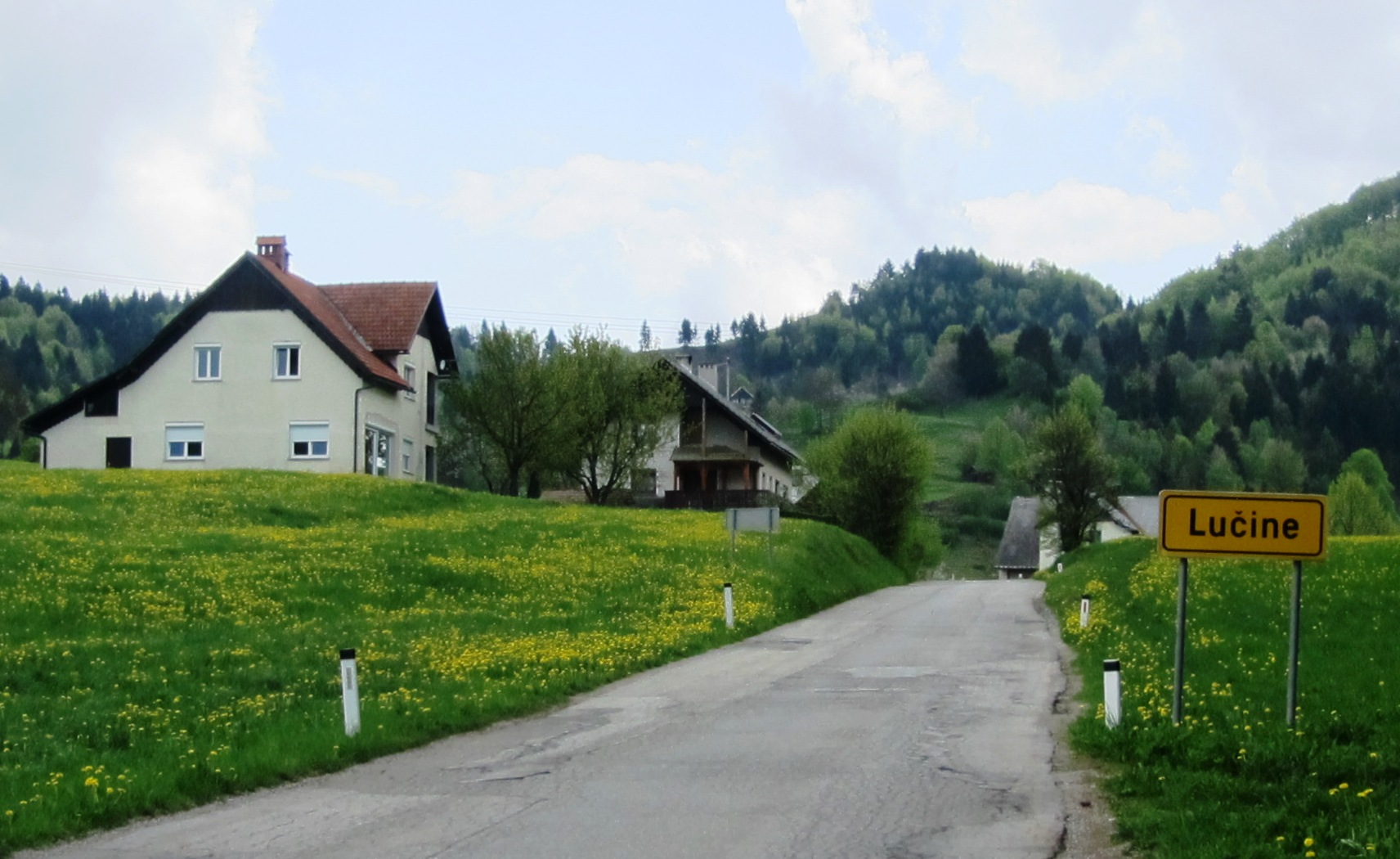
- Lučine

- Location in Slovenia
- Coordinates: 46°3′42.11″N 14°11′47.18″E
- Country: Slovenia
- Traditional region: Upper Carniola
- Statistical region: Upper Carniola
- Municipality: Gorenja Vas–Poljane

Area
  - Total: 2.34 km^{2} (0.90 sq mi)
- Elevation: 634 m (2,080 ft)

Population (2020)
  - Total: 176
  - Density: 75.2/km^{2} (195/sq mi)

Lučine (pronounced [ˈluːtʃinɛ]; in older sources also Lučna, German: Lutschna) is a village in the hills south of Gorenja Vas in the Municipality of Gorenja Vas–Poljane in the Upper Carniola region of Slovenia.

== Name ==
Lučine was first attested in written sources as Lutschen in 1291 and Lutsschen in 1318. The name Lučine, like similar toponyms (e.g., Luče, Leutschach < Lučane), is derived from the Slavic personal name *Ľubъkъ and likely refers to an early inhabitant of the place. In the past the German name was Lutschna.

== Church ==
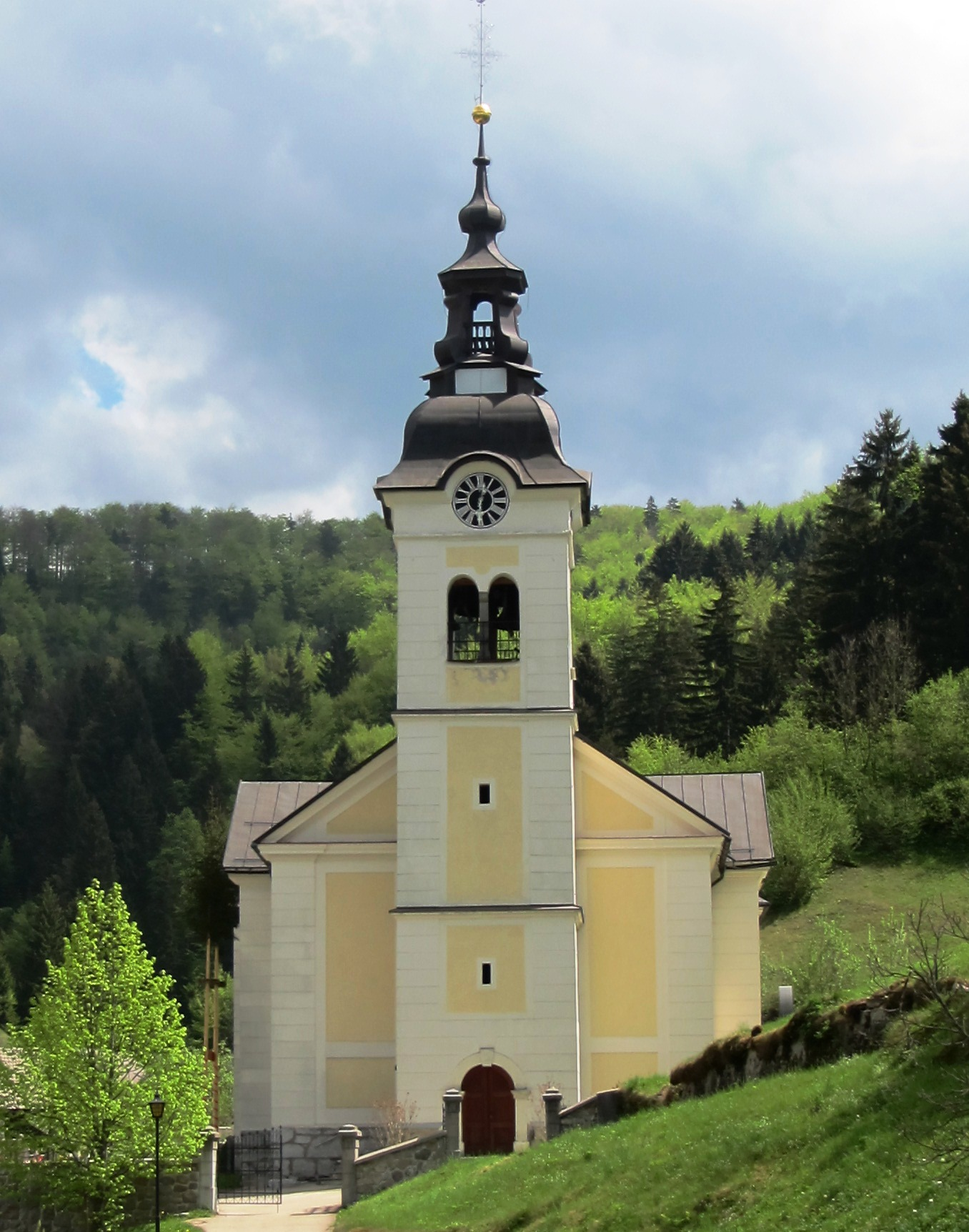
Saint Vitus' Church

The local church is dedicated to Saint Vitus (Slovene: sveti Vid) and stands in the eastern part of the settlement in the middle of a cemetery. The original Late Gothic church was extended and a belfry was added in 1669. In 1898 the old church, apart from the belfry, was demolished to make way for an entirely new building. The current church has a rectangular nave with side chapels and an octagonal presbytery walled on three sides. The church was designed by Anton Jeblinger in 1897 and the stonework was executed by Peter Bevk from 1898 to 1899.

== Notable people ==
Notable people who lived or were born in Lučine include:

- Janez Nepomuk Oblak (1780–1858), attorney
