= FIA International Hill Climb Cup =

Motorsport competition

- Category: single-seater cars, open-cockpit sports prototypes, and touring cars
- Country: International
- Inaugural season: 2014
- Official website: FIA International Hill Climb Cup

The FIA International Hill Climb Cup is an FIA-run motorsport competition held across World on public roads, created in 2014, resulting from the merge between FIA European Hill Climb Cup and FIA International Hill Climb Challenge

Unlike circuit racing, each driver competes alone, starting from a point at the base of a mountain and reaching a finish point near the summit. The FIA International Hill Climb Cup allows single-seater cars, open-cockpit sports prototypes, and touring cars with varying degrees of technical preparation.

Unlike the events of the FIA European Hill Climb Championship, for which the minimum course length must be 5 km, no minimum length is set for the roads used during the events of the International Hill Climb Cup.

== Podiums ==
Year	Category	Gold	Silver	Bronze
2014	Category I - Production	(Italy) Gabriella Pedroni		
2014	Category I - E1	(Bulgaria) Nikolay Zlatkov		
2014	Category II	(Czech Republic) Vaclav Janik		
2015	Category I - Production	(Italy) Armin Hafner	(Poland) Grzegorz Duda	(Croatia) Laszlo Hernadi
2015	Category I - E1	(Switzerland) Ronnie Bratschie	(Austria) Karl Schagerl	(Bulgaria) Nikolay Zlatkov
2015	Category II	(Czech Republic) Vaclav Janik	(Switzerland) Tiziano Riva	(Czech Republic) Petr Trnka
2016	Category I - Production	(Italy) Gabriella Pedroni	(Croatia) Laszlo Hernadi	(Slovakia) Peter Jurena
2016	Category II - Competition	(Czech Republic) Vaclav Janik	(Czech Republic) Petr Trnka	(Czech Republic) Jiri Svoboda
2016	Category III - E1	(Switzerland) Ronnie Bratschie	(Austria) Felix Pailer	(Austria) Karl Schagerl
2017	Category I - Production	(Italy) Gabriella Pedroni	(Austria) Reinhold Taus	(Croatia) Laszlo Hernadi
2017	Category II - Competition	(Czech Republic) Vaclav Janik	(Czech Republic) Jiri Svoboda	(Switzerland) Marcel Steiner
2017	Category III - E1	(Austria) Karl Schagerl	(Czech Republic) Karel Trneny	(Bulgaria) Nikolay Zlatkov
2018	Category I - Production	(Austria) Reinhold Taus	(Slovakia) Peter Ambruz	(Slovenia) Peter Marc
2018	Category II - Competition	(Czech Republic) Vaclav Janik	(Austria) Christoph Lambert	(Italy) Francesco Turatello (Italy) Manuel Dondi (Italy) Christian Merli
2018	Category III - E1	(Switzerland) Ronnie Bratschie	(Bulgaria) Nikolay Zlatkov	(Czech Republic) Karel Trneny
2019	Category I - Production	(Slovakia) Peter Ambruz	(Italy) Tonino Cossu	(Slovakia) Anna Ambruz
2019	Category II - Competition	(France) Sébastien Petit	(Czech Republic) Ales Mlejnek	(Czech Republic) Vaclav Janik
2019	Category III - E1	(Czech Republic) Karel Trneny	(Czech Republic) Vieroslav Cvrcek	(Switzerland) Ronnie Bratschie (Croatia) Domagoj Perekovic (Austria) Karl Schagerl
2020	Not held			
2021	Category I - Closed Cars	(Czech Republic) Karel Trneny	(Czech Republic) Dan Michl	(Italy) Tonino Cossu
2021	Category II - Competition	(France) Sébastien Petit	(Czech Republic) Vaclav Janik	(Czech Republic) David Dedek
2022	Category I - Closed Cars	(Czech Republic) Dan Michl	(Poland) Piotr Staniszewski	(Italy) Tonino Cossu
2022	Category II - Competition	(France) Sébastien Petit	(Czech Republic) Petr Vitek	(Czech Republic) Josef Hlavinka
2023	Category I - Closed Cars	(Czech Republic) Dan Michl	(Poland) Szymon Plekos	(Poland) Krzysztof Olender
2023	Category II - Competition	(France) Sébastien Petit	(Italy) Federico Liber	(France) Axel Petit
2024	Category I - Closed Cars	(Poland) Janusz Grzyb	(Italy) Giovanni Grasso	(Czech Republic) Dan Michl
2024	Category II - Competition	(France) Sébastien Petit	(Italy) Stefano Di Fulvio	(Czech Republic) Ales Mlejnek

== Winners ==
Season	Class	Driver	Car
2021	Cat. I - Production	(Czech Republic) Karel Trněný	Skoda Fabia
2021	Cat. II - Competition	(France) Sébastien Petit	Nova NP 01-2
2020	Canceled due to COVID-19 Pandemic		
2019	Cat. I - Production	(Slovakia) Peter Ambruz	
2019	Cat. II - Competition	(France) Sébastien Petit	
2019	Cat. III - E1	(Czech Republic) Karel Trněný	
2018	Cat. I - Production	(Austria) Reinhold Taus	Subaru Impreza WRX (Gr. A)
2018	Cat. II	(Czech Republic) Vaclav Janik	Norma M20 FC (Gr. E2-SC)
2018	Cat. III - gr. E1	(Switzerland) Ronnie Bratschi	Mitsubishi Lancer Evo VIII (Gr. E1)
2017	Cat. I - Production	(Italy) Gabriella Pedroni	Mitsubishi Lancer Evo IX (Gr. N)
2017	Cat. II	(Czech Republic) Vaclav Janík	Norma M20 FC (Gr. E2-SC)
2017	Cat. III - gr. E1	(Austria) Karl Schagerl	BMW 2002 Tii Alpina (Gr. E1)
2016	Cat. I - Production	(Italy) Gabriella Pedroni	Mitsubishi Lancer Evo VIII (Gr. A)
2016	Cat. II	(Czech Republic) Vaclav Janík	Norma M20 FC (Gr. E2-SC)
2016	Cat. III - gr. E1	(Switzerland) Ronnie Bratschi	Mitsubishi Lancer Evo VIII (Gr. E1)
2015	Cat. I - Production	(Italy) Armin Hafner	Mitsubishi Lancer Evo VIII (Gr. A)
2015	Cat. II	(Czech Republic) Vaclav Janík	Norma M20 FC (Gr. E2-SC)
2015	Cat. III - gr. E1	(Switzerland) Ronnie Bratschi	Mitsubishi Lancer Evo VIII (Gr. E1)
2014	Cat. I - Production	(Italy) Gabriela Pedroni	Mitsubishi Lancer Evo VIII (Gr. A)
2014	Cat. I - gr. E1	(Bulgaria) Nikolay Zlatkov	Audi Quattro S1
2014	Cat. II	(Czech Republic) Václav Janík	Lola B02/50 (Gr. E2)
2013	FIA Challenge	(Czech Republic) Václav Janík	Lola B02/50 (Gr. E2)
2013	FIA Cup	(Czech Republic) Dan Michl	Lotus Evora (Gr. E1)
2012	FIA Challenge	(Czech Republic) Václav Janík	Lola B02/50 (Gr. E2)
2012	FIA Cup	(Czech Republic) Dan Michl	Opel Michl 2.8 (Gr. E1)
2011	FIA Challenge Region 1	(Italy) Rudi Bicciato	Mitsubishi Lancer EVO VI (Gr. A)
2011	FIA Challenge Region 2	(Czech Republic) Milan Svoboda	Lola T95/50 (Gr. E2)
2011	FIA Cup Region 1	(Italy) Fulvio Giuliani	Lancia Delta Integrale (Gr. E1)
2011	FIA Cup Region 2	(Czech Republic) Dan Michl	Opel Michl 2.8 (Gr. E1)
2010	FIA Challenge Region 1	(Italy) Franco Cinelli	Lola B99/50 Zytec F3000 (Gr. E2)
2010	FIA Challenge Region 2	(Hungary) Laszlo Hernadi	Mitsubishi Lancer Evo VIII (Gr. A)
2010	FIA Cup Region 1	(Czech Republic) Dan Michl	Opel Michl (Gr. E1)
2010	FIA Cup Region 2	(Czech Republic) Dan Michl	Opel Michl (Gr. E1)
2009	FIA Challenge Region 1	(Italy) Rudi Bicciato	Mitsubishi Lancer EVO VI (Gr. A)
2009	FIA Challenge Region 2	(Italy) Rudi Bicciato	Mitsubishi Lancer EVO VI (Gr. A)
2009	FIA Cup Region 1	(Czech Republic) Dan Michl	Opel Michl (Gr. E1)
2009	FIA Cup Region 2	(Germany) Georg Plasa	BMW 320 Judd (Gr. E1)
2008	FIA Challenge	(Hungary) Laszlo Hernadi	BMW M3 (Gr. A)
2008	FIA Cup	(Germany) Georg Plasa	BMW 320 Judd (Gr. E1)
2007	FIA Challenge	(Hungary) Laszlo Hernadi	BMW M3 (Gr. A)
2007	FIA Cup	(Germany) Georg Plasa	BMW 320 Judd (Gr. E1)
2006	FIA Challenge	(Hungary) Laszlo Hernadi	BMW M3 (Gr. A)
2006	FIA Cup	(Germany) Georg Plasa	BMW 320 Judd (Gr. E1)
2005	FIA Challenge	(Germany) Georg Plasa	BMW 320 Judd (Gr. E1)
2005	FIA Cup	(Spain) Ander Vilariño	Reynard 01L F3000 (Gr. E2)
2004	FIA Challenge	(Germany) Georg Plasa	BMW 320 Judd (Gr. E1)
2003	FIA Challenge	(Germany) Georg Plasa	BMW 320 Judd (Gr. E1)
2003	FIA Cup	(Hungary) Laszlo Szasz	Reynard 93D F3000 (Gr. E2)
2002	FIA Challenge Region 1	(Slovakia) Peter Jureňa	Mitsubishi Lancer EVO VII (Gr. N)
2002	FIA Challenge Region 2	(Slovakia) Peter Jureňa	Mitsubishi Lancer EVO VII (Gr. N)
2002	FIA Cup	(Hungary) Laszlo Szasz	Reynard 93D F3000 (Gr. E2)
2001	FIA Challenge Region 1	(Austria) Walter Struckmann	Opel Astra GSi (Gr. N)
2001	FIA Challenge Region 2	(Germany) Herbert Stenger	Stenger ES991 (Gr. CN)
2001	FIA Cup	(Austria) Walter Leitgeb	Reynard 95D F3000 (Gr. E2)
2000	FIA Challenge Region 1	(Czech Republic) Jiří Mičánek	Dallara 393 F3 (Gr. E2)
2000	FIA Challenge Region 2	(Germany) Herbert Stenger	Stenger ES991 (Gr. CN)
2000	FIA Challenge Region 3	(Slovakia) Jaroslav Krajči	Reynard 923 F3 (Gr. E2)
2000	FIA Cup	(Austria) Walter Leitgeb	Reynard 95D F3000 (Gr. E2)

== See also ==
- European Hill Climb Championship
- Hillclimbing
- Mont Ventoux Hill Climb
