= Trento-Bondone Hill Climb =

Trento-Bondone
- Location: Trento, Italy
- Time zone: GMT
- Opened: 5 July 1925
- Major Events: European Hill Climb Championship
- Hill Length: 17.3 kilometres (10.7 mi)
- Hill Record: 9'00"53 (Simone Faggioli (Norma M20 FC), 2017, European Hill Climb Championship)

The Trento-Bondone Hill Climb is a hillclimbing competition starting in Trento and finishing on the Monte Bondone, organised by the Scuderia Trentina of the Automobile Club d'Italia. The first competition event was held on 5 July 1925. The course is 17.3 km (10.75 mi) in length. It was described as "an absurdly dramatic climb" that begins in the Adige valley at 275 metres elevation and climbs to 1650 metres in the Alps, for an average gradient of 7.9%. The track is part of the European Hill Climb Championship. In 2014, the course was recreated in the videogame Assetto Corsa.
