= Bizzarrini Manta =

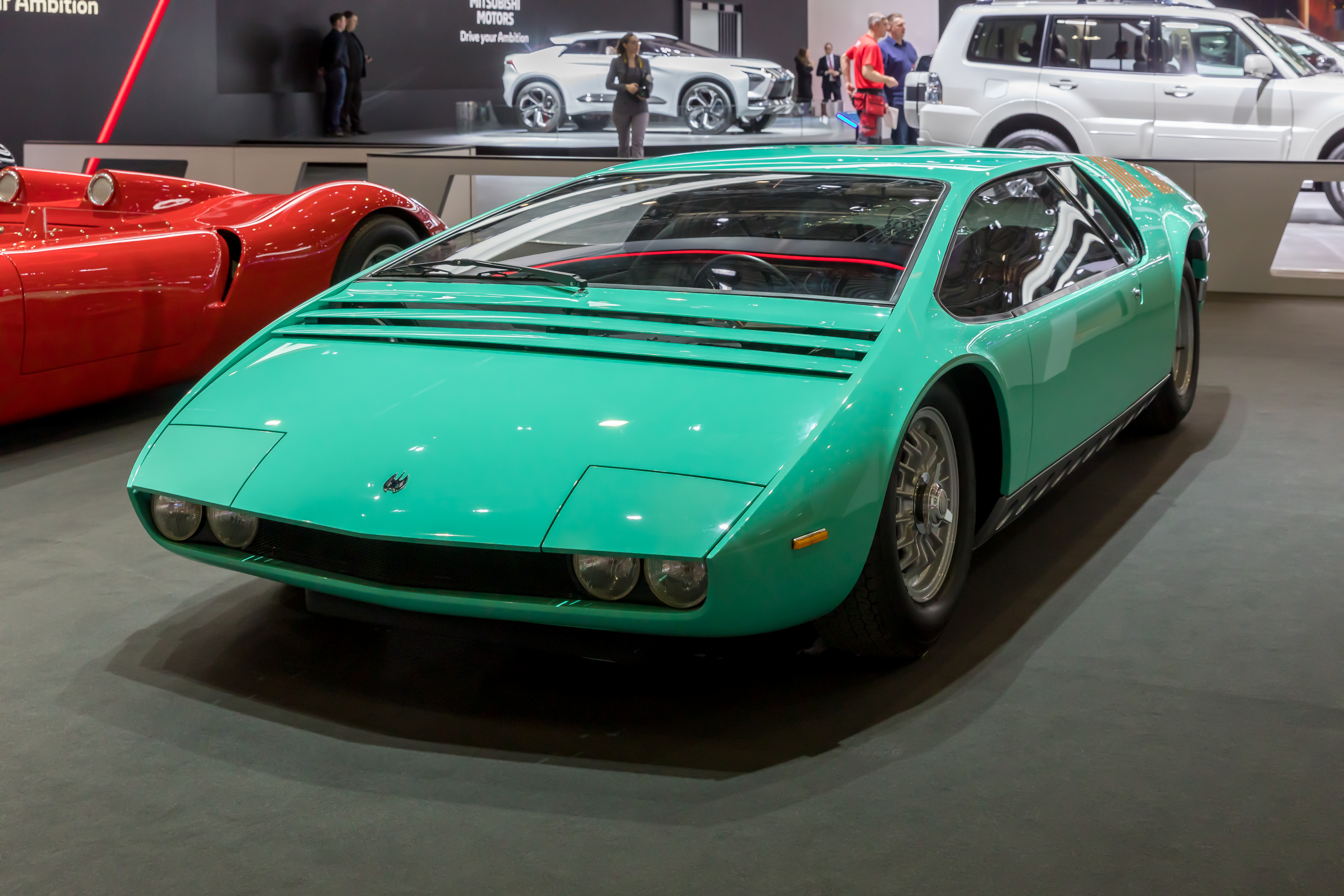

Overview
- Manufacturer: Bizzarrini
- Production: 1968
- Designer: Giorgetto Giugiaro

Body and chassis
- Body style: 2-door coupe
- Layout: RMR layout

The Bizzarrini Manta is a concept car designed by Italdesign, which was presented to the public in 1968. The body designed by Giorgetto Giugiaro in the so-called one-box style is considered to be groundbreaking for the design of later mid-engine sports cars. According to the manufacturer, the frame and chassis come from a Bizzarrini P538, the engine is a high-volume eight-cylinder Chevrolet.

== History ==
=== Italdesign ===
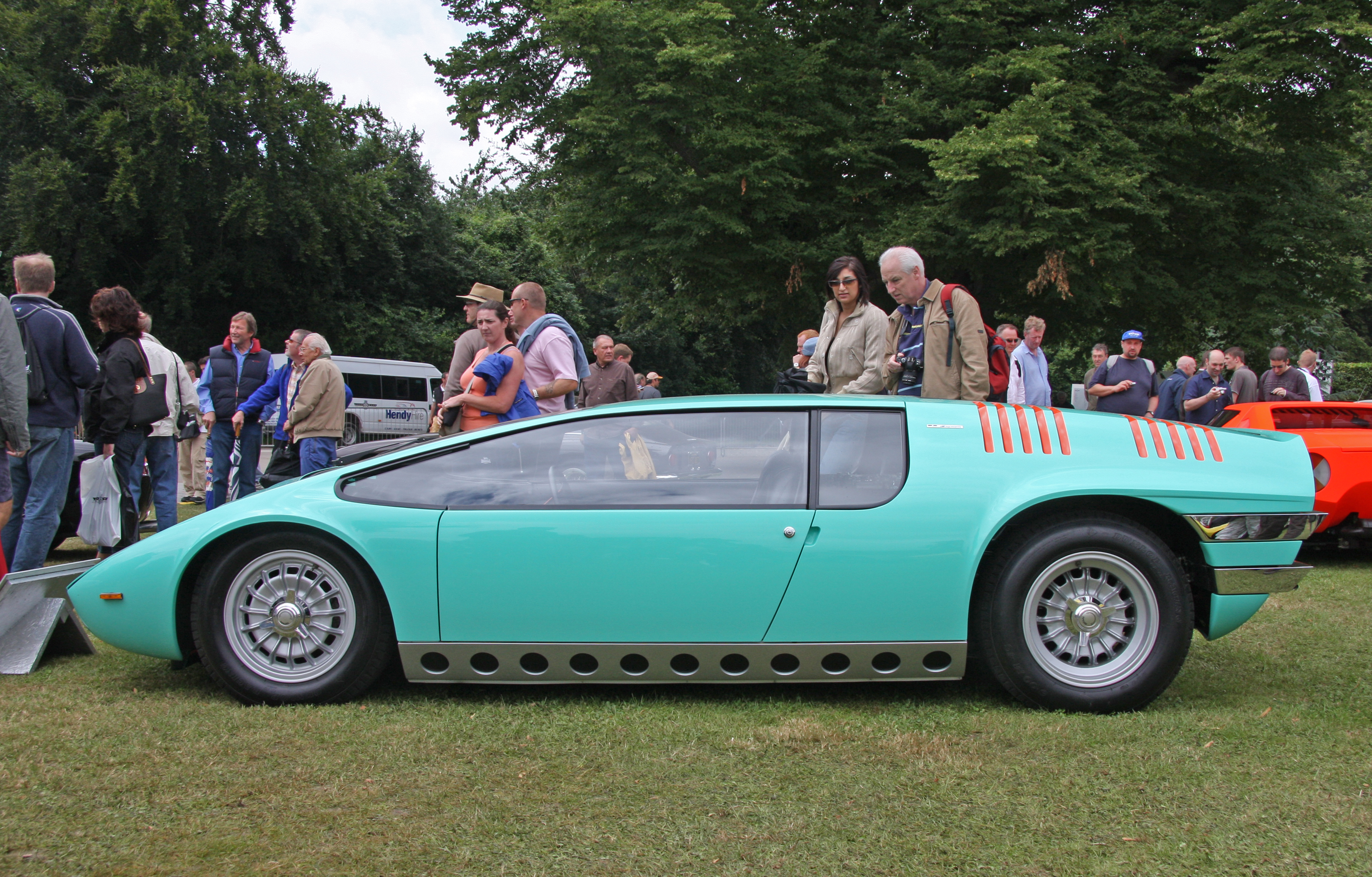
Manta side

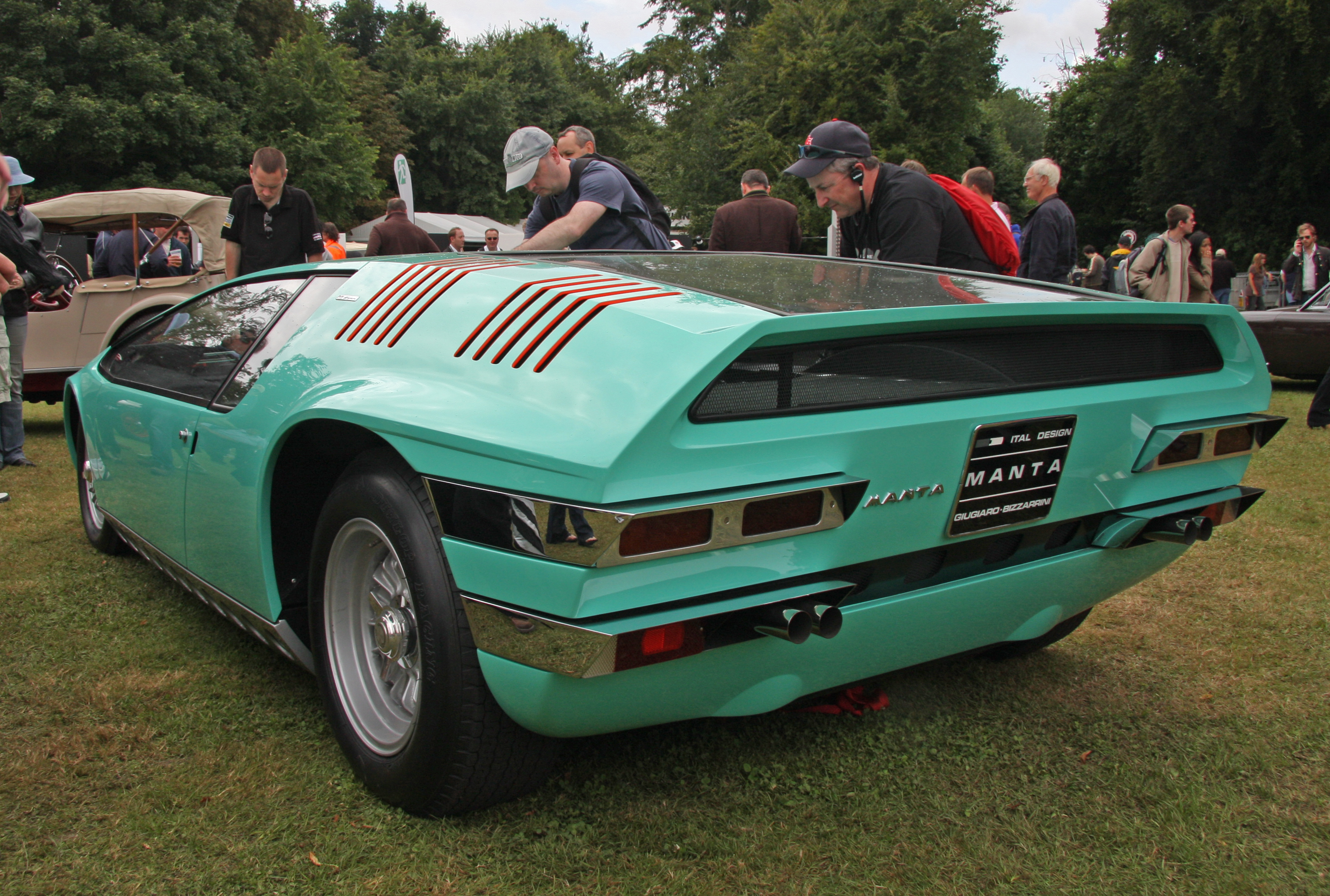
Manta left rear

The Manta was designed by the Italian industrial designer Giorgetto Giugiaro. Giugiaro, born in 1938, headed the design studio of coachbuilder Bertone from 1959 and held the same position at Carrozzeria Ghia from 1965. After parting ways with Ghia in early 1967, he initially founded the design studio Ital Styling, which only existed for about a year. In order to be able to offer construction services in the future in addition to pure design work, Giugiaro entered into a collaboration with Aldo Mantovani, Fiat's long-standing production manager. Together they founded the company SIRP (Studi Italiani Realizzazione Prototipi S.p.A.) in February 1968, which was renamed Italdesign in the same year. The company's first design study was to be presented at the Turin Motor Show in October 1968.

=== Bizzarrini ===
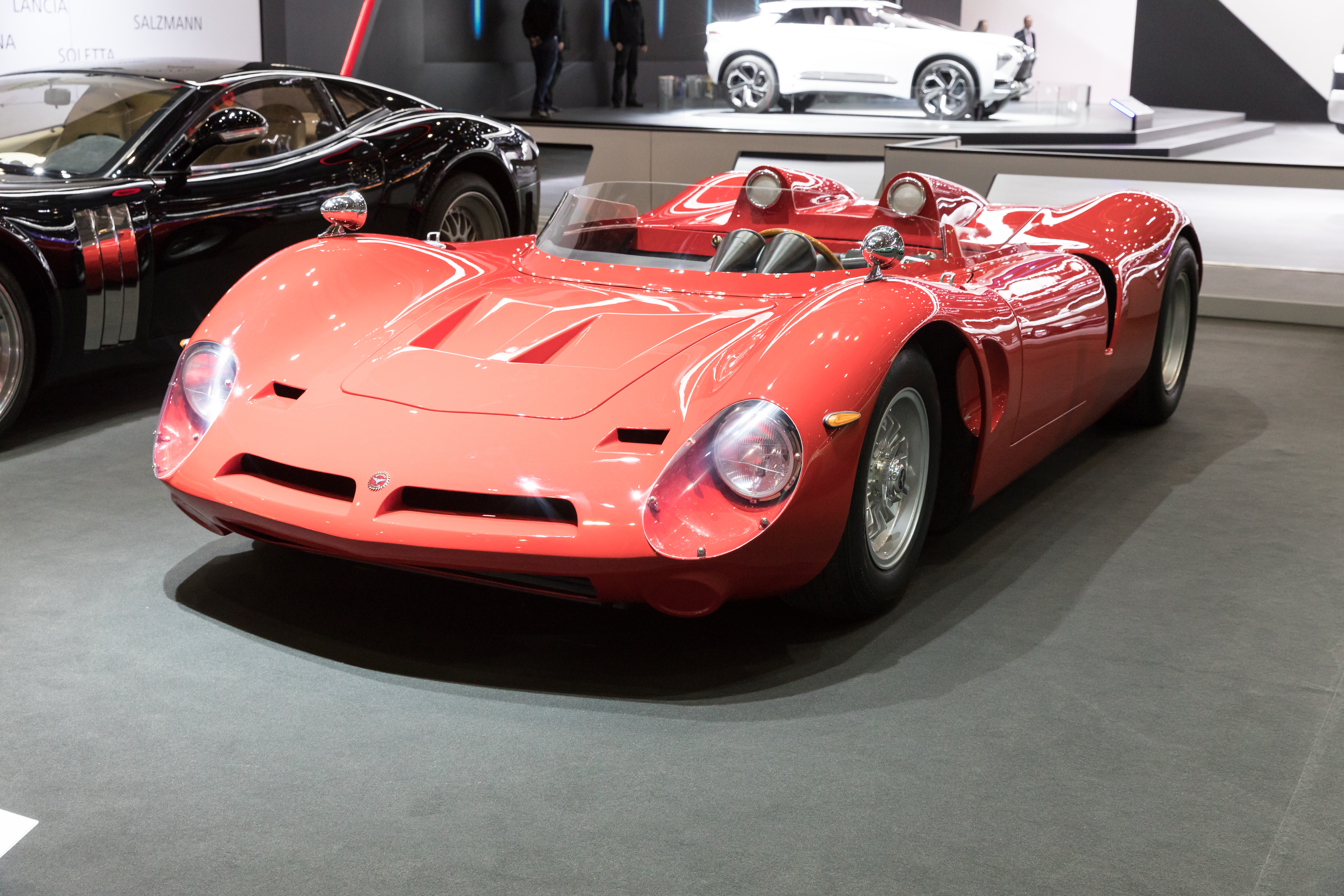
The Bizzarrini P538, the technical basis for the Manta

The technical basis for Italdesign's first show car came from the Tuscan sports car manufacturer Bizzarrini, which was already in financial difficulties at the time. In 1966, Bizzarrini designed the P538 racing car as a supplement to the roadworthy GT 5300 sports car, which, contrary to expectations, was only used in two competitions and was no longer legal from 1967 due to far-reaching rule changes. (Note: In 1967, the class of prototypes for closed vehicles was advertised. Bizzarrini retrofitted the open P 538 with a plastic roof and gullwing doors, but was not given permission to start at Le Mans for this version. In 1968, the Commission Sportive Internationale (CSI) surprisingly limited the displacement of the prototypes to 3.0 liters. The P 538 did not meet this limit with any of the factory engines, which were 4.0 or 5.4 liters in size. Vgl. zum Ganzen Wolfgang Blaube: Ein Fisch namens Manta. Vorstellung des Bizzarrini Manta und Kurzbeschreibung der Geschichte des Bizzarrini P 538 in: Oldtimer Markt, Heft 10/2008, S. 47.) Only four P538s were built up to 1968, one of which was destroyed prematurely. The P 538-003 chassis used by Bizzarrini's works team in the 1966 24 Hours of Le Mans was thus outdated and was up for sale. Giugiaro took over the chassis in the summer of 1968. In 45 days, the specialist Autocostruzioni S.D. the show car, which was not roadworthy at the time.

Individual sources doubt that the P538 is the technical basis of the Manta. Some authors see significant technical differences between the P538 chassis and the operational Manta and therefore believe that the Manta cannot be based on the P538 chassis. Giugiaro only declared the car as a Bizzarrini in order to have a catchy name for his first show car. On the other hand, Giugiaro explicitly confirmed in 2008 that the Manta was based on a P538 chassis. He pointed out that the Manta was not made roadworthy until decades after it was first shown. Technical deviations could therefore also be due to this work. The Italdesign website, which is no longer maintained by Giugiaro himself, incorrectly names an Iso Grifo – a car with a front engine – as the base vehicle in 2019.
