= Salvatore Diomante =

Salvatore Diomante is an automobile engineer and restorer, best known as Bizzarrini's factory manager in the 1960s. He started his own firm in 1968; one of his first contracts involved building the AMC AMX III.

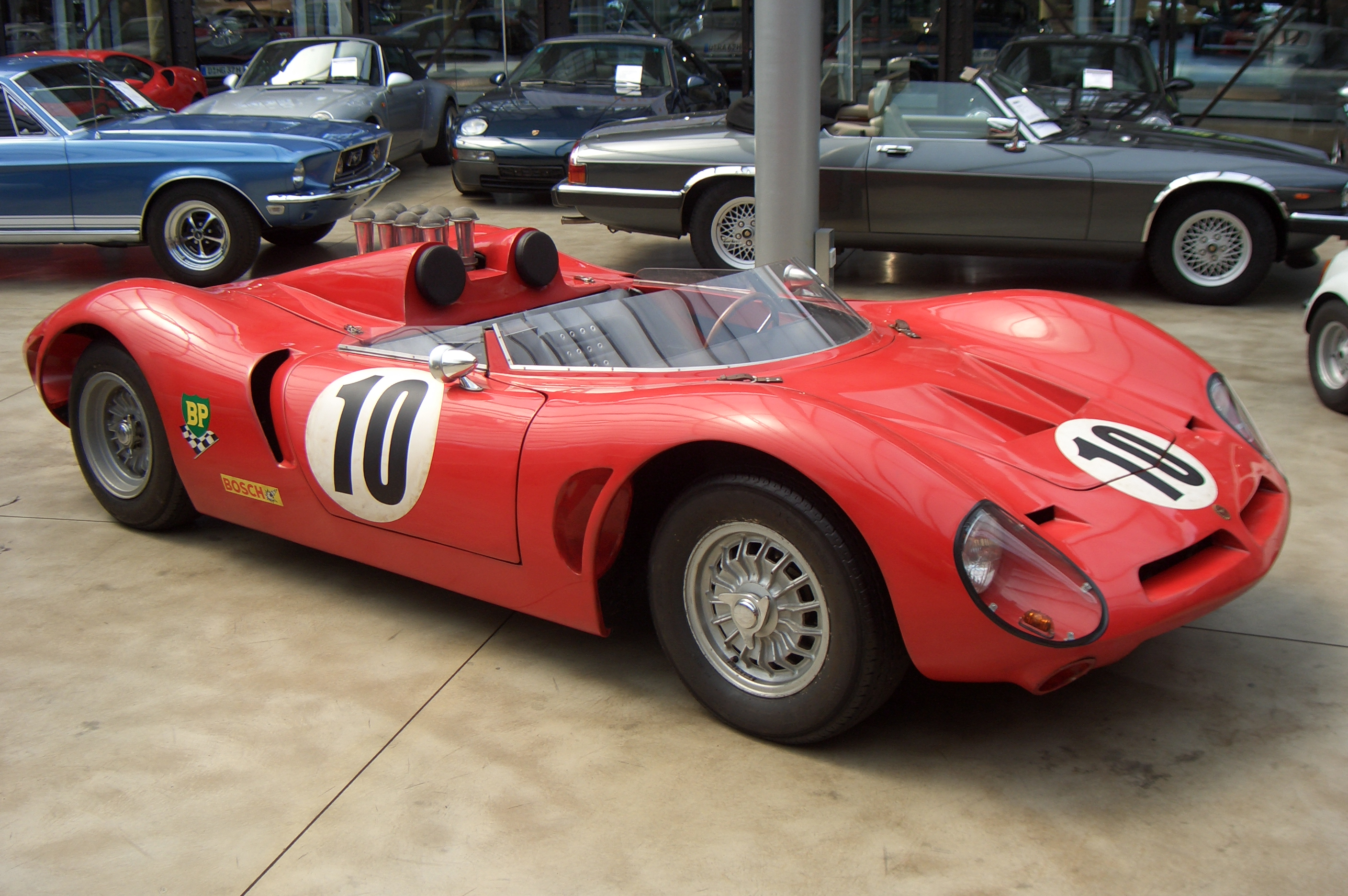
Bizzarrini P538 constructed by Autocostruzioni S.D.

Diomante resides in Nichelino, Italy and operates Autocostruzioni S.D., where he keeps parts, special tools and original moulds from Bizzarrini P538s and Bizzarrini 5300s. He rebuilds and restores old Bizzarrini cars, as well as other Italian exotic cars.

He usually is called by owners to make spare parts. Some info talk about some new cars and replicas built using original and old sourced parts.

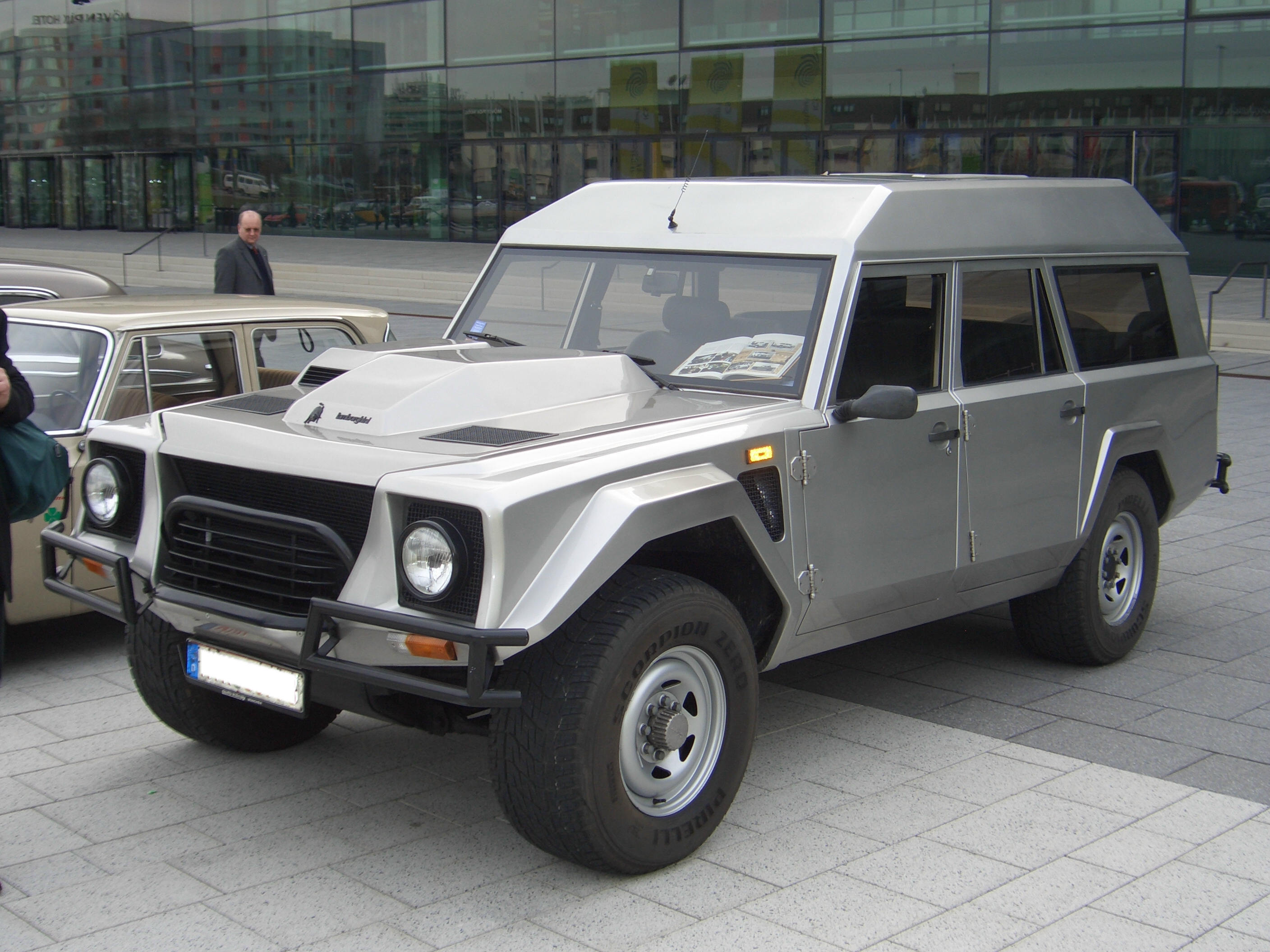
Lamborghini LM002 conversion by Diomante

In the eighties, Diomante offered stretched versions of several Italian cars. A long wheelbase Fiat 131 and a Maserati Quattroporte elongated by 65 cm were some of his efforts. The Quattroporte offered a sumptuous interior and a correspondingly high price tag of 210 million lire. The stretched 131, called the SD 131 Diplomatic, sat on a 60 cm longer wheelbase than usual and was thus nearly 5 metres long. It was a four-door sedan with an added middle row of seats. Diomante also constructed a stretched station wagon version of the Lamborghini LM002 for the Sultan of Brunei. They also carried out stretched conversions and landaulettes on Rolls-Royce and Bentley basis.
