= Max Balchowsky =

American race car builder and driver (1924–1998)

Max Earnest Balchowsky
- Born: January 15, 1924; Fairmont, West Virginia, U.S.
- Died: August 30, 1998 (aged 74); Fairmont, West Virginia, U.S.
- Spouse: Ina Marie Balchowsky (1949–1986; her death)

Max Balchowsky (January 15, 1924 – August 30, 1998) was a prominent 1950s and 1960s American race car builder and driver, and was involved in the film industry as a stuntman and an automotive mechanic. He is remembered for his crude but spectator-popular underdog Old Yeller Specials that competed against many of Europe's most exotic and expensive sports cars.

== Early life ==
Balchowsky was born and raised in Fairmont, West Virginia. His early training in mechanical engineering came when he worked in watch repair and bicycle shops at a young age. He served in World War II as a B-24 belly turret gunner in the European campaign, and following injuries incurred while bailing out, served in the Burma Campaign.

After the war, Balchowsky moved to Southern California where he worked in his brother Caspar's garage and became involved in street hot rod and drag racing.

In 1949, Balchowsky married Ina Wilson and they opened Hollywood Motors at 4905 Hollywood Blvd in Hollywood, California. The business catered to auto enthusiasts with Balchowsky specializing in replacing European engines with more powerful American V-8s, predominantly Buick and Cadillac engines. Several of his engine swaps were illustrated in Hot Rod magazine at the time. Ina was an active part of Hollywood Motors and in the racing they participated in. She not only took care of the business part of the business, but also welded, fabricated, tuned engines, and set up their race cars for the track.

== Racing ==
Balchowsky competed in street, drag and most notably in California Sports Car Club (Cal Club) and Sports Club Car of America (SCCA) races. From 1951 to 1960 he entered 64 SCCA and USAC races, with 38 finishes, five wins, nine class wins and 18 podium finishes.

In 1952, Balchowsky bought a 1932 Ford roadster hot rod with a LaSalle engine. He drag raced it and raced it in sports car races which was unusual at the time. After changing the engine to a Buick V-8 he found success. He nicknamed it Bu-Ford Special.

Between 1954 and 1955, Balchowsky purchased six or seven Doretti Swallow sports cars, swapping their 2-litre Triumph engines for Buicks, Cadillac and Chevrolet engines, and replacing their transmissions with Jaguar and Ford transmissions. Most were sold to customers and Balchowsky kept one for himself which he called the Buretti Special. He drag and sports car raced it. He raced his Buretti often in 1955 and 1956 and in a couple of races in 1957.

From 1955 to 1960, Balchowsky raced his famed Old Yeller/Ol' Yaller cars with much success. He won two 1957 SCCA National Sports Car Championship races out of fifteen in his group (BM). When Balchowsky wasn't driving his cars, some of the best drivers of the day took the helm, including, Dan Gurney, Carroll Shelby, Bob Bondurant, Billy Krause, Bob Drake, Paul O'Shea, and Ronnie Bucknum.

In 1965, Balchowsky was a mechanic for the two Bizzarrini Iso Grifo cars powered by Chevrolet 327s for the Sebring 12 Hour Grand Prix of Endurance. Unfortunately both cars crashed. Balchowsky took the wrecked cars back to his shop, started building a car using parts from the two totaled cars but the result has never surfaced.

In 1966, car owner Chuck Jones brought driver Skip Hudson and Balchowsky together to campaign his Lola T70 Spyder in the United States Road Racing Championship series. According to Jones, they placed either second or third overall by season's end with a third at Road America 500 miles.

== Old Yeller and Ol' Yaller Race Cars ==
Balchowsky designed and built nine Old Yeller/Ol' Yaller cars. His first two were named Old Yeller after the dog in Disney's 1957 film who was yellow, mangy and unwanted. Disney didn't like that so Balchowsky changed the spelling of his cars to "Ol' Yaller." The first two were crudely built and parts were sourced from junkyards but they proved very competitive with the high torque Buick V8 nailhead engine. Cinematographer Haskell Wexler financed/sponsored many of the cars. He remarked that, "I never kept track of which Old Yellers were really mine or not. I paid for the right to be the owner and to be around Max and to be around the cars and to drive the car on the streets."

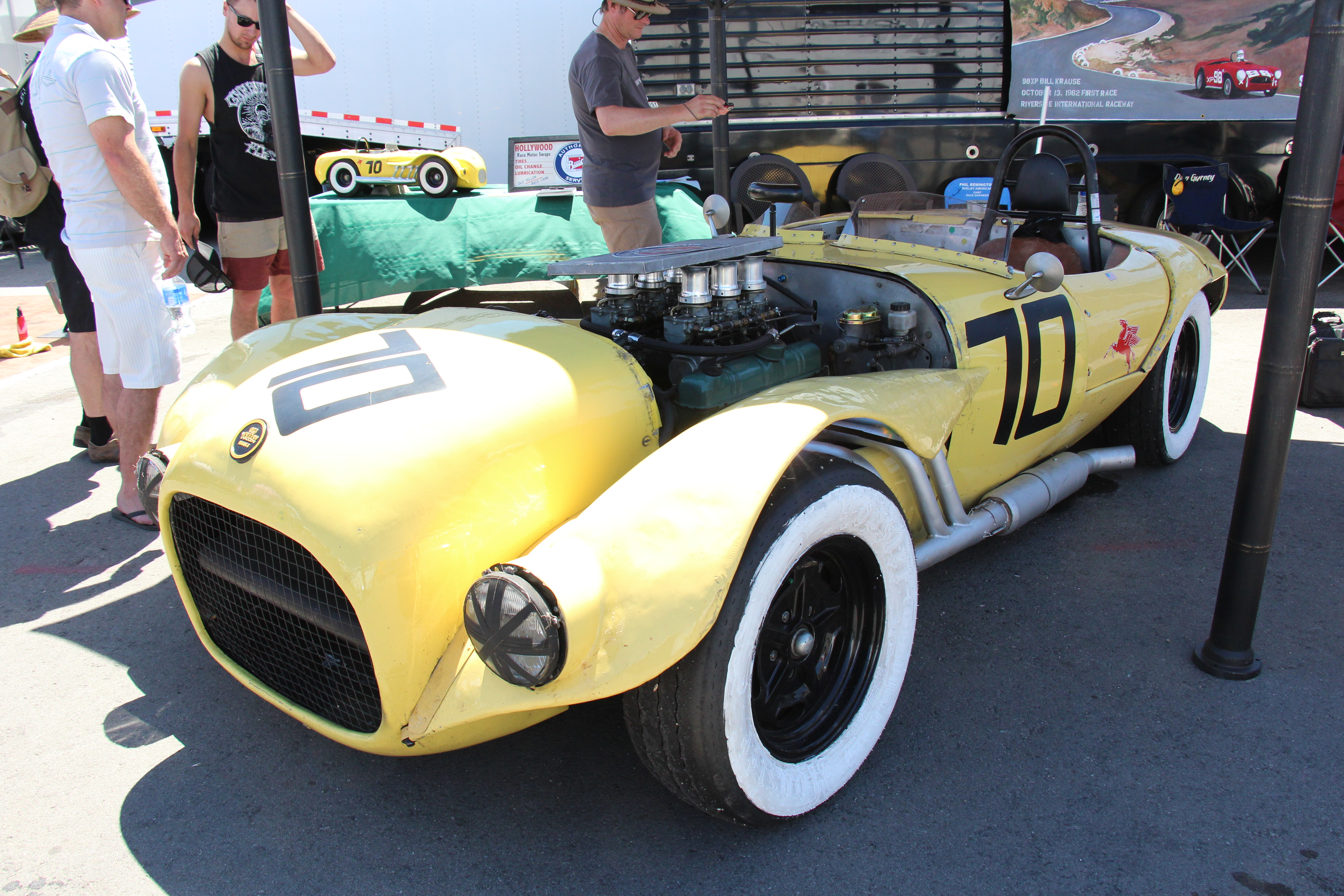
1959 Old Yeller II

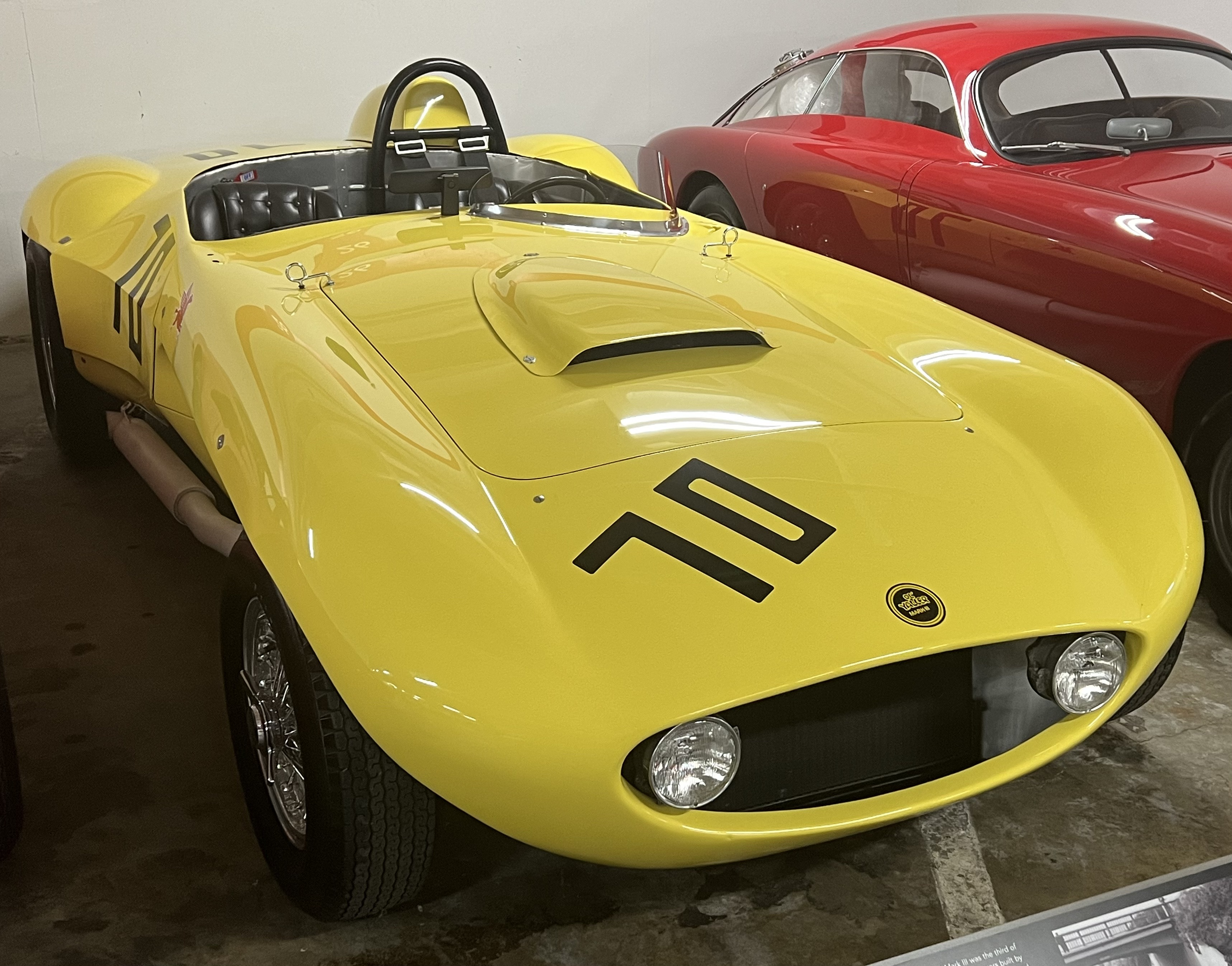
1959 Ol'Yaller

Name	Year	Engine	Notes
I	circa 1955	Buick	Formerly the Dick Morgensen Special, acquired in 1954 after a fatal racing accident. Balchowsky rebuilt it, changed the engine to a Buick and co-raced it with partner Eric Hauser. When the partnership ended, Hauser took the chassis and body and Balchowsky took the engine.
II	1959	Buick	Cost $1456. The car's frame was famously built from garage floor chalk lines. Tubular ladder type frame. Jaguar transmission. Studebaker rear-end. This was Balchowsky's most famous car that was raced in 1959 and 1960 and produced the most wins of Balchowsky's cars. It is still raced today in heritage racing by Dr. Ernie Nagamatsu—a long time friend of Max and Ina Balchowsky—who purchased it in 1989.
III	1959	Buick	Financed by Haskell Wexler. Initially built for street use but later raced.
IV	1961		Financed by Haskell Wexler. Raced by Bill Krause and Bob Drake. The car was retired from racing after crashing in its second race.
V	1961	Chev	Built in collaboration with Jim Simpson & Dave MacDonald. who built the custom 1961 No. 00 Corvette Special. The car carried a body molded from a stock 1961 Corvette which was shortened.
VI	1961	NA	Chassis without engine and body. Sold to Bob Sohus. Sohus named it Godzilla because of a payment disagreement.
VII	1961	Chev	Sold to Don Kirby of Rochester, NY. for $4500.
VIII	1962	Chevy	Built for Haskell Wexler. Part of a Jaguar chassis/body used. Later customized by Dean Jefferies.
IX	1963	Buick	Sponsored by Haskell Wexler. Raced by Ronnie Bucknum. Engine later changed to a Ford 427.

== Film Work ==
Balchowsky was involved in the production of many films working as a mechanic to modify, repair, and maintain the cars, as a consultant, and as a stunt driver. He is noted for preparing the Mustangs and Dodges used in the film Bullitt which had one of Hollywood's most iconic car chase scenes.

Filmography
Title	Year	Role	Credited	Notes
On the Beach	1959	Stunt Driver	No	Balchowsky drove his Buick powered Swallow Doretti in the Australian GP scenes.
It's a Mad, Mad, Mad, Mad World	1963	Stunts	No	
Viva Las Vegas	1966	Stunt driver	No	Ol' Yaller III and VIII used in Las Vegas GP scenes. Ol' Yaller III was wrecked.
Spinout	1966	Stunts	No	An Ol' Yaller car used in Santa Fe Road Race scenes.
Grand Prix	1966	Stunt driver	No	
Speedway	1968	Stunts	No	Last of the three Elvis Presley movies Balchowsky worked on.
Bullitt	1968	Stunts	No	Modified the two Mustangs and two Chargers used in the chase scene and supplied a modified Old Yeller camera car
The Love Bug	1968	Actor, mechanic stunts	No	Supplied stunt & camera cars, and maintained the Love Bug. His stunt work can be seen in the scene where Tennessee Steinmetz (Buddy Hackett) hangs out of the Love Bug as they take a corner too fast.
Vanishing Point	1971	Stunts	No	Maintained the 5 1970 Dodge Challenger R/Ts used in filming.
Slaughterhouse-Five	1972	Stunts	No	
Magnum Force	1973	Stunts	No	
The Front Page	1974	Stunts	No	
The Sugarland Express	1974	Stunts	No	
The Deer Hunter	1978	Stuntman	No	
The Visitor	1979	Stuntman	No	
The Promise	1979	Actor	Yes	Truck driver
Eye of the Tiger	1986	Assistant stunt coordinator, stunts, auto mechanic	Yes	
Brain Donors	1992	Stunts	Yes	

== Legacy ==
- Old Yeller I was included in Hot Rod's 2008 "Top 100 Hot Rods That Changed the World" list at No. 95.
- Dr. Ernie Nagamatsu has been an enthusiastic ambassador for Old Yeller II and Max and Ina Balchowsky while heritage racing at home and internationally. He has:
  - Raced at the Goodwood Festival of Speed and the Goodwood Revival Meeting more than twelve times
  - Raced at Silverstone Classic, Chateau Impney Hill Climb, and the Rod Millen Leadfoot Festival Hill Climb in 2017
  - Won the Rolex Phil Hill Monterey Cup in 2005
  - Received the first Bruce McLaren Perpetual Trophy at the New Zealand Festival of Motor Racing
  - Received the Rolex Australian F1 Grand Prix Historic Race "Winner" Trophy
  - Raced Old Yeller II in many of the national heritage events such as Road America, Coronado Speed Festival and Monterey
  - Shown Old Yeller II at Amelia Island Concours d'Elegance and Pebble Beach Concours d'Elegance where he won awards
- Ol' Yaller VIII sold for $198,000 at the Las Vegas Barrett-Jackson Auction in 2009,
- Ol' Yallers III and IX are part of the Petersen Automotive Museum collection in Los Angeles, California.
- The Steve McQueen 1968 Bullitt movie Mustang with Balchowsky modified engine and suspension is in the National Historic Vehicle Register.
- Max Balchowsky and his 1963 Ol' Yaller IX was one of 12 cars and builders featured in The Petersen Automotive Museum exhibit, "Legends of Los Angeles and Southern California Race Cars and Their Builders" which ran from November 10, 2018, through December 1, 2019.
- Jay Leno in May 2021 released a Jay Leno's Garage episode showcasing Max Balchowsky's 1959 Old Yeller II and the car's owner and driver, Ernie Nagamatsu.
- VeloceToday.com posted that Ernie Nagamatsu on March 9th, 2025, had a serious accident during the 36th Phillip Island Classic in Australia.
