= Bizzarrini =

Italian automotive manufacturer

Bizzarrini S.p.A.
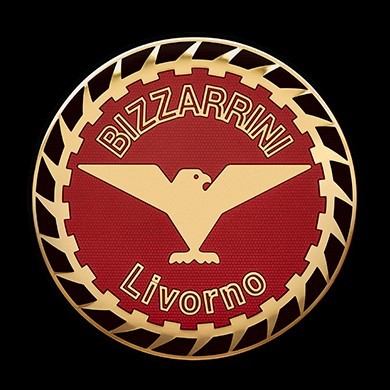
- Industry: Automotive
- Founded: 1964, Livorno, Italy
- Founder: Giotto Bizzarrini
- Key people: Isobel Dando (CEO); Ulrich Bez (Special Advisor); Ian Fenton (Special Advisor); Chris Porritt (CTO)
- Products: Sports cars
- Owner: Rezam Al Roumi
- Parent: Pegasus Automotive Group
- Website: www.bizzarrini.com

Bizzarrini S.p.A. was an Italian automotive manufacturer. In 1964, the company was founded by former Alfa Romeo, Ferrari and Iso engineer Giotto Bizzarrini. The company built a small number of highly developed and advanced sports and racing automobiles before failing in 1969. In 2020, it was announced that the name had been acquired by Pegasus brands, together with plans to restart production.

Originally Prototipi Bizzarrini s.r.l., the name was changed to Bizzarrini S.p.A. in 1966. Notable models include the 5300 GT Strada, 5300 GT Spyder S.I., and the P538S. Attempts to bring back the Bizzarrini name resulted in a number of concept cars in the 2000s.

== Giotto Bizzarrini ==
Giotto Bizzarrini was born in Livorno, Italy in 1926. His father was a rich landowner who came from a family with strong roots in Tuscany and the city of Livorno. His grandfather, also named Giotto Bizzarrini, was a biologist who had worked with Guglielmo Marconi on his inventions, especially the radio, following which one of the Livorno Library sections was named The Bizzarrini Library.

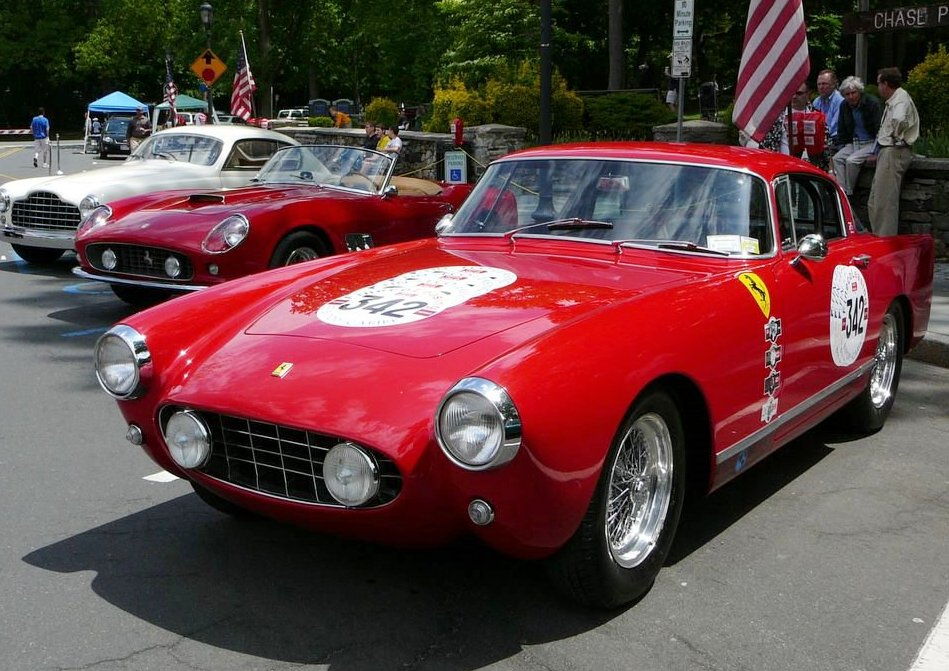
1959 GT Boano

Bizzarrini graduated as an engineer at the University of Pisa in 1953. He taught briefly before joining Alfa Romeo in 1954. He worked for Alfa Romeo from 1954 to 1957. He began working for Ferrari in 1957, eventually becoming controller of experimental, Sports and GT car development. He worked at Ferrari as a developer, designer, test driver, and chief engineer for five years. His developments there included the Ferrari 250 TR, the Ferrari 250 GT SWB (Short Wheelbase Berlinetta or Berlinetta Passo Corto), and the 1962 Ferrari 250 GTO.

Bizzarrini was fired by Ferrari during the "palace revolt" of 1961. He became part of Automobili Turismo e Sport (ATS)), a company started by the ex-Ferrari engineers to build a Formula 1 single seater and a GT sport car, the A.T.S. Serenissima.

One of ATS's financial backers, Count Giovanni Volpi, owner of Scuderia Serenissima, hired Bizzarrini to upgrade a Ferrari 250 GT SWB, with chassis number #2819GT to GTO specifications. This resulted in the Ferrari 250 GT SWB Drogo also known as the "Breadvan".

Bizzarrini's engineering company, Societa Autostar, was commissioned to design a V-12 engine for a GT car to be built by another dissatisfied Ferrari customer, Ferruccio Lamborghini. Lamborghini considered the resulting engine to be too highly strung, and ordered that it be detuned.

== Iso Rivolta ==
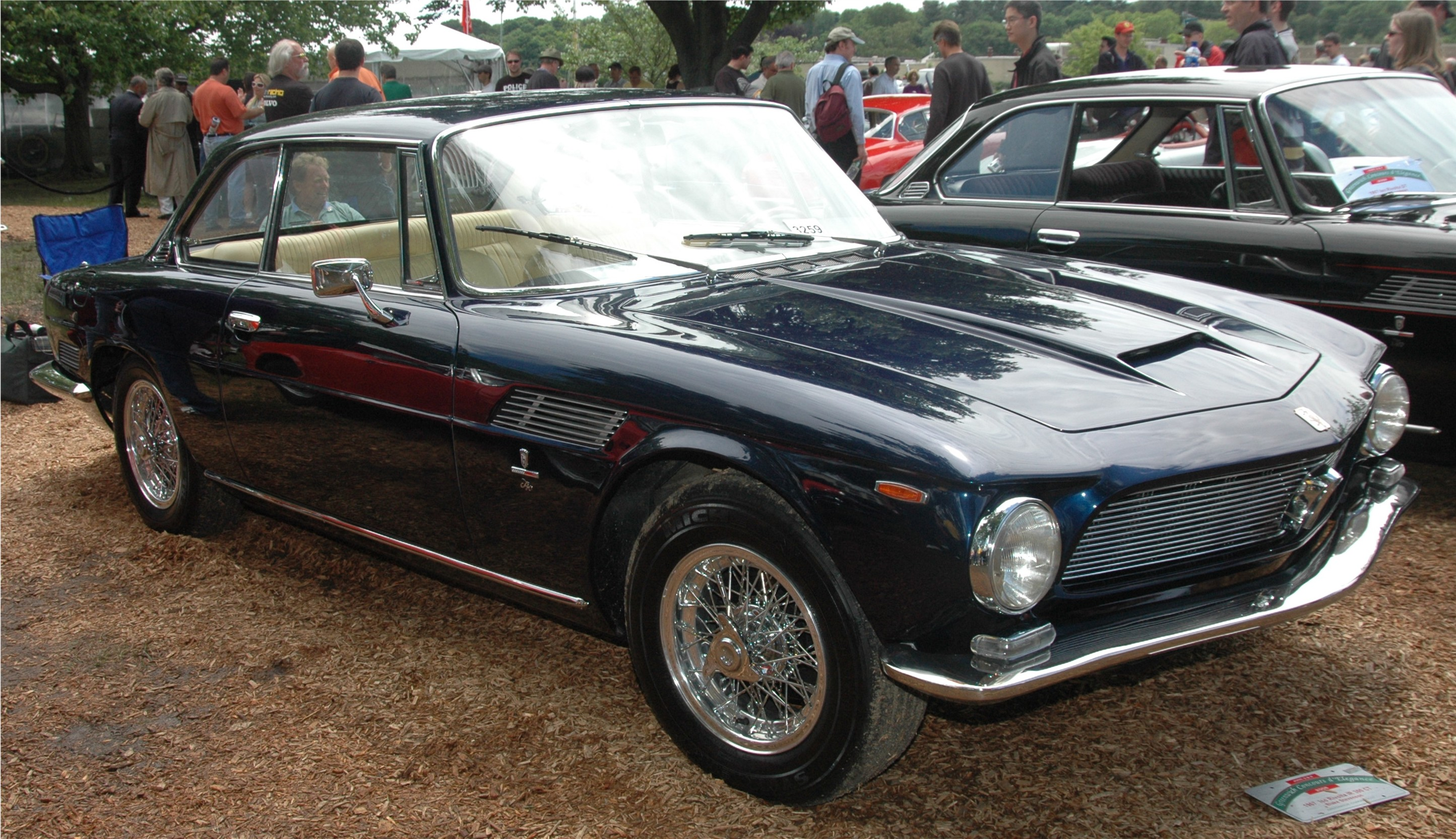
1967 Iso Rivolta IR 300 GT Coupe

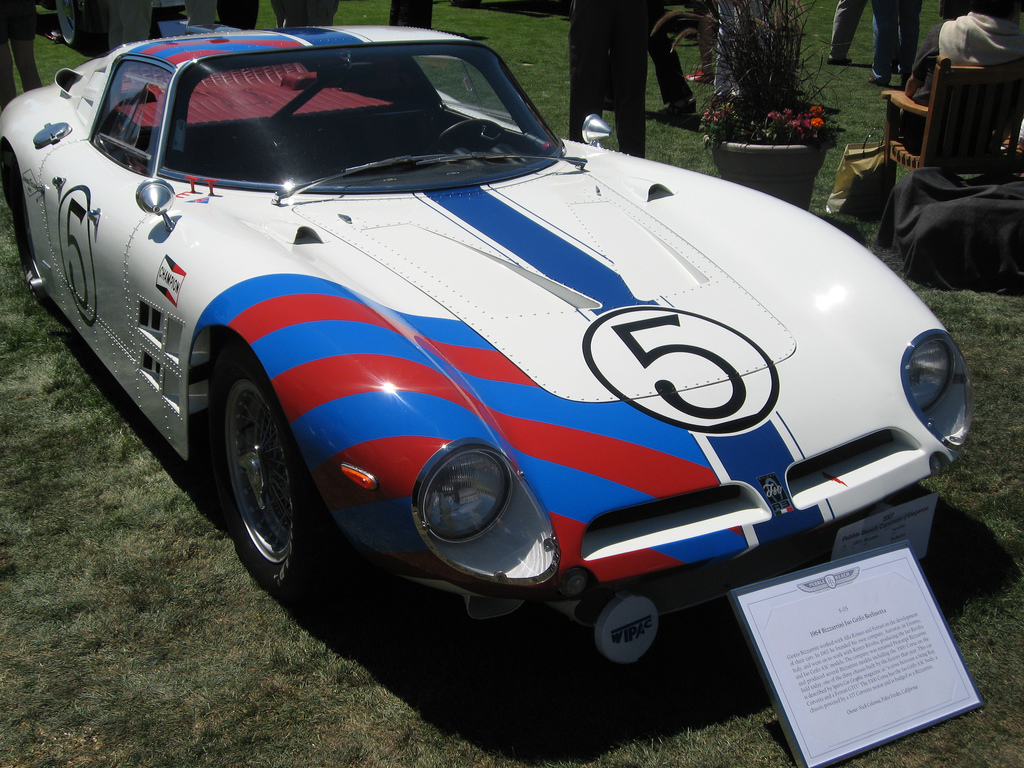
1964 Bizzarrini Iso Grifo Berlinetta 5300 Corsa (Grifo AC3 body and Corvette 327 cu in (5,360 cc) engine).

Bizzarrini worked since 1964 for Iso Rivolta and developed three models: Iso Rivolta GT, Iso Grifo both A3L and A3C versions. His work was to develop a pressed steel frame chassis for Iso cars. Renzo Rivolta hired him as consultant to the Iso Gordon GT project which became the Iso Rivolta GT. The Iso Gordon GT prototype was developed from the Gordon-Keeble. The Gordon Keeble GT was designed in 1960 by Giorgetto Giugiaro. Bizzarrini tested the car and was impressed by the powerful V8 Corvette engine and the rear De Dion tube suspension used for the GT.

The Iso Rivolta GT was a Giugiaro-designed four-seater and was a successful car for Iso, with 799 units sold. Powered by a 327 cu in (5.36 L) Chevrolet Corvette V8 engine with a classic De Dion rear suspension design with pressed steel monocoque bodywork over pressed steel frame chassis. Unveiled to the press in 1963, production continued until 1970.

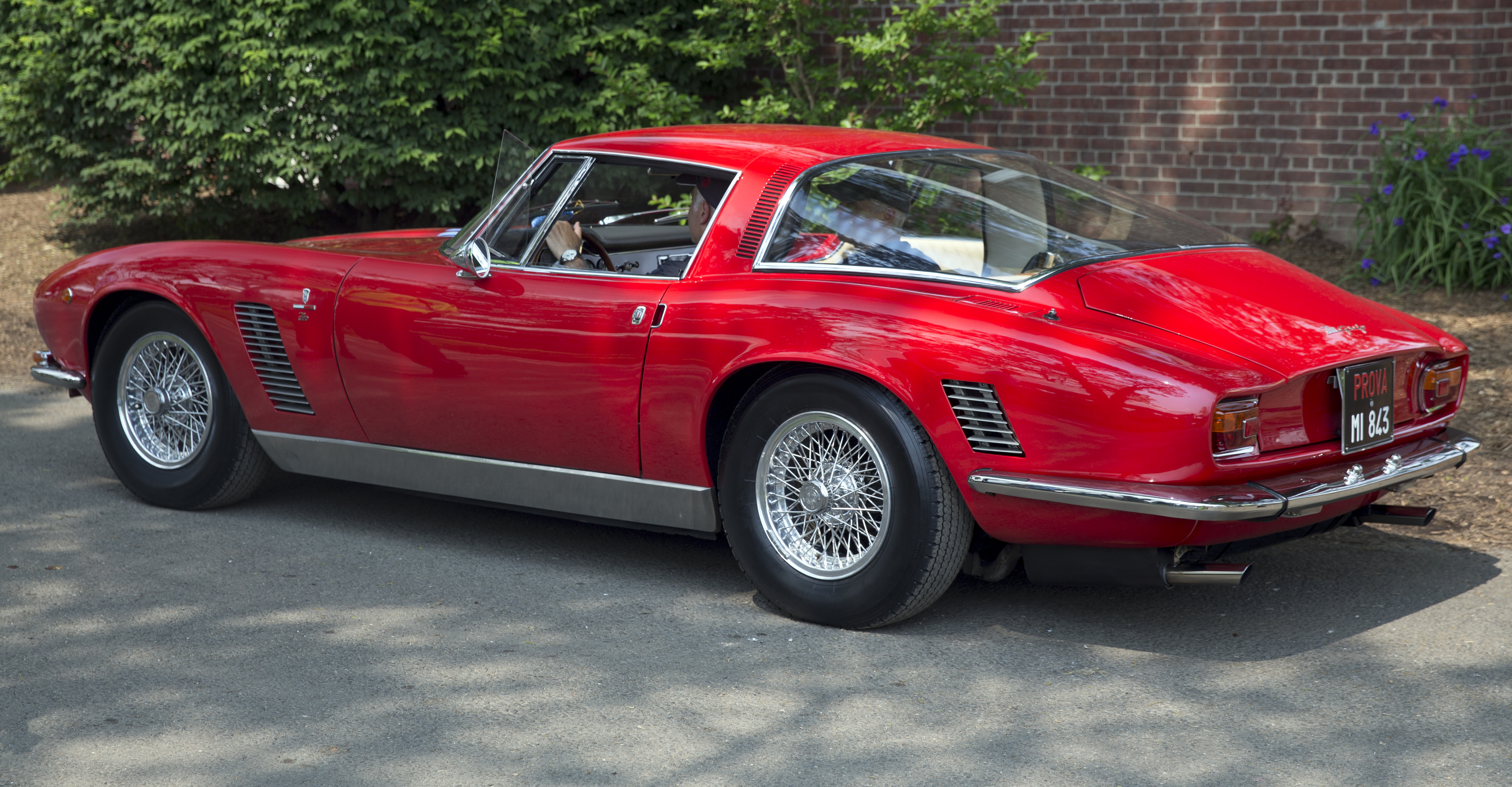
Iso Grifo Series I, rear view

=== Iso Grifo ===
The Iso Grifo A3L is a V8 powered 2-door coupe, the L coming from Lusso. The result of Giugiaro and Bizzarrini working together, it was based on a shortened Iso Rivolta GT chassis and was debuted at the 1963 Turin show. It was the fastest production car tested by Autocar Magazine in 1966 with a top speed of 160 mph (260 km/h). Later versions of the Grifo were powered by a big block Chevrolet Corvette 435 bhp (324 kW; 441 PS) engine. These 90 handbuilt units are distinguishable by the raised "pagoda style" scoop bonnet. Some of these Iso Grifo 7 Litri units were rebuilt later with even bigger engines.

The idea of Bizzarrini was to use the 3AL cars for competition. The competition versions of the Grifo were named Iso Grifo A3C, C for Competizione or Corsa. A new lightweight riveted aluminium body was designed and built by Piero Drogo. It was an aggressively-designed machine, oriented to endurance races. It uses normal Iso underpinnings but the engine was moved further back in the chassis frame than the Grifo A3L, protruding well into the driver's cabin, fitted with hot cams and fed by four big Weber carburetors, giving more than 400 bhp (298 kW; 406 PS).

Around 29 A3C sport cars were built under the Iso name. Five of these 29 cars were bodied in plastic/fiberglass by Piero Drogo at Carrozzeria Sports Cars in Modena. A3Cs were widely raced. Some cars entered the 1964 and 1965 Le Mans 24 hour, 1965 Nürburgring 1000 and 1965 Sebring. It achieved a Le Mans class win in both years and a 9th overall in 1965 with no factory support. A3Cs were one of the fastest cars on Le Mans' Mulsanne Straight in both years.

== Bizzarrini S.p. A ==
Due to the complicated deal with Iso, Bizzarrini left in 1964 and founded Societa Prototipi Bizzarrini (Bizzarrini S.p. A), which produced some 140 cars through 1969 at its Livorno factory.

=== Racing ===
Giotto Bizzarrini was a dedicated race car designer and builder. Likely one of the sources of disagreement between Renzo Rivolta and Giotto Bizzarrini was Bizzarrini's desire to build race cars and Renzo Rivolta's desire to build high quality GT cars and family transportation cars. They decided to part ways in 1964.

Bizzarrini had mixed success in racing. The lowlight for Bizzarrini must certainly have been the Sebring 12 Hours on March 27, 1965, where both Iso/Bizzarrini race cars crashed causing serious damage, placing them beyond repair.

The highlight came later that same year at the 24 Hours of Le Mans on June 19–20, 1965 where an Iso Grifo/Bizzarrini won the 5000 cc and over class and was ninth overall.

Sebring 12 Hours 1965

C. Rino Argento helped Bizzarrini manage the race cars during that terrible week in June 1965 at Sebring. He has written a detailed account of that week, which was originally published in the Griffon, the magazine of the Iso & Bizzarrini Owner's Club.

Car No. 8, driven by Silvio Moser, went off track due to brake failure and crashed into a Volkswagen bus. Nobody was injured, but the car was a total loss.

Later during a very heavy rain storm car No. 9, driven by Mike Gammino, aquaplaned, hit the pedestrian bridge and split in two. The car split right behind the driver and Mike Gammino did not realize how close he came to being killed until he stepped out of the car.

The famous California race car builder Max Balchowsky was also at Sebring helping the Bizzarrini team. He took all of the pieces of these two Iso/Bizzarrini race cars back to his shop in Southern California with the intention to build one Iso/Bizzarrini from the pieces of the two destroyed cars. This recreated Iso/Bizzarrini race car has never been seen again.

There was a morbid end to the week: a plane crash killed Iso and Bizzarrini supporter Mitch Michelmore and his son as they were on their way back to California. Michelmore "had a Chevrolet dealership in Reseda, California and he had sold quite a few Iso Rivoltas; he was enthusiastic about the cars and interested in the racing version (the Grifos) and was seriously considering a sales activity for them in this country", according to C. Rino Argento.

Argento said, “This was the end of a terrible week and the pain was unbearable for me, the organizer of this adventure! In great part because of my initiative and planning, all these people had congregated at Sebring for what was supposed to be a fun, interesting, successful, and profitable race and it turned out to be a human and material disaster!”

=== 5300 Strada ===
In 1966 Bizzarrini S.p.A. released a street legal Grifo A3C as the Bizzarrini 5300 GT Strada (or Bizzarrini 5300 GT America, depending on the market). The body shape and mechanical parts were much the same as the Iso A3Cs, resulting in a coupe that is 43 inches (1.09 m) in height.

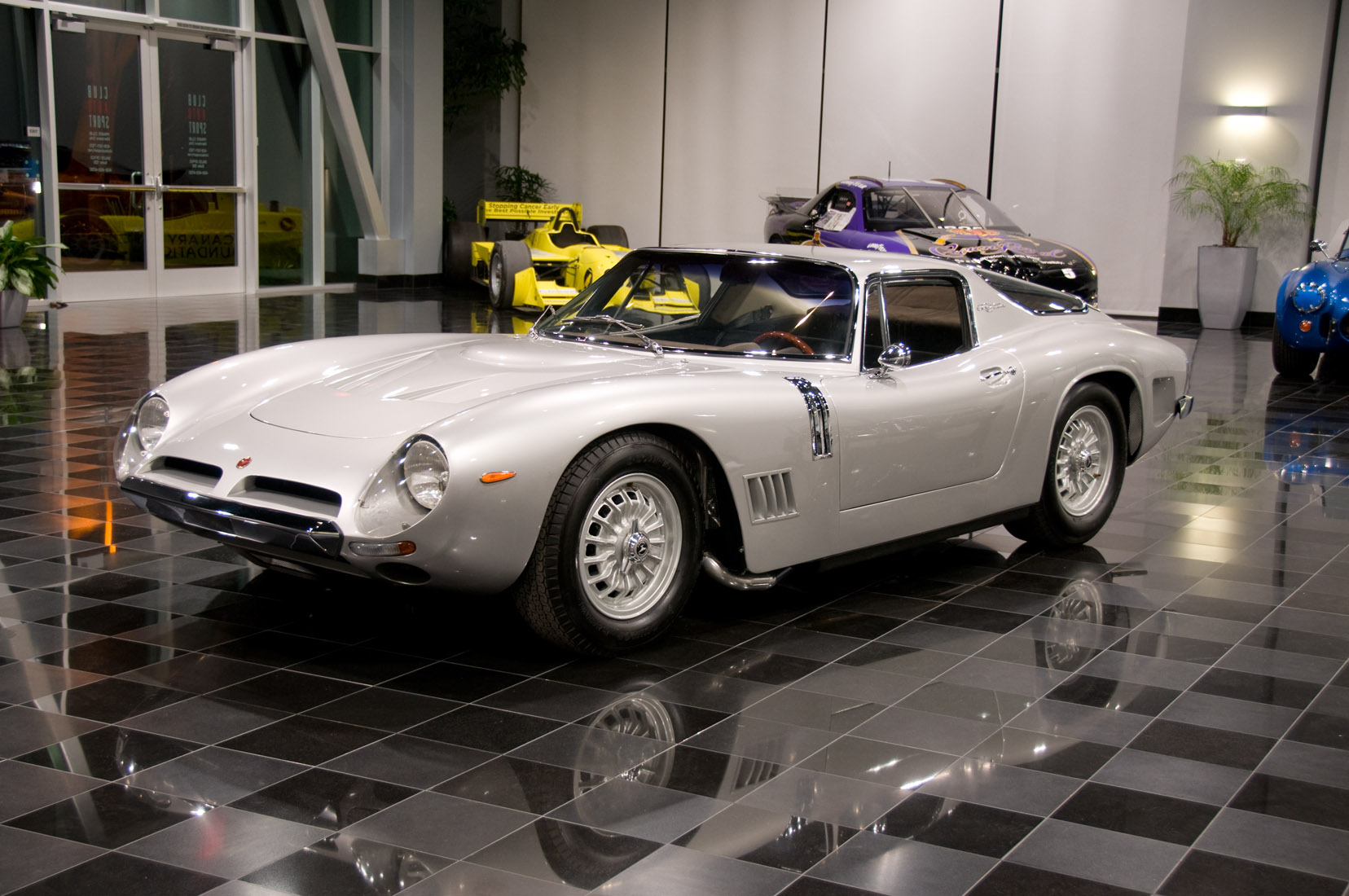
1966 Bizzarrini GT 5300 Chassis No. 0256

=== 5300 Spyder S.I ===
Only three Bizzarrini GT 5300s Spyder S.I were built starting in 1966, Under Ing Giotto Bizzarrini supervision were turned out by Stile Italia (S.I) D'Iseglio -Ex Engineer of (Berton) and Sibona e Basano (SB) Ex-Chief Metalsmith & Ex Mold maker (Ghia). This 1966 Bizzarrini GT 5300 Spyder S.I (Prototype) was one of the stars at the 1966 Geneva Motor Show, shown as a spyder/targa versions, all three still survive today and two currently owned by the same person. https://bizzarrinispyder.com/.

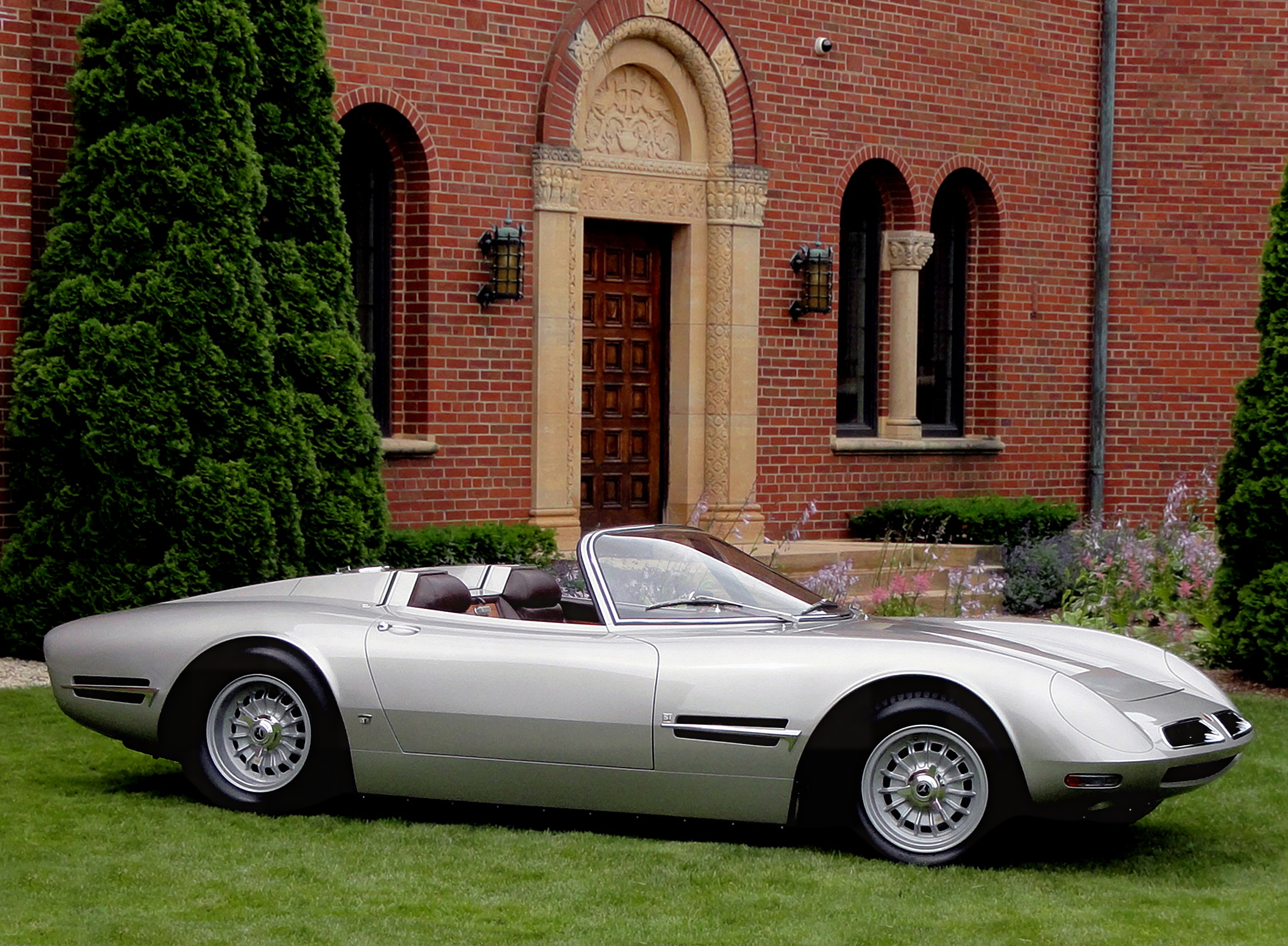
1966 Bizzarrini GT 5300 Spyder S.I. (Prototype) Chassis No.IA3*0245*

=== 1900 GT Europa ===
Bizzarrini also managed a scaled-down 5300 GT project. Designed for GM-Opel, it was based on the Opel 1900 platform. Bizzarrini's proposal was more aggressive and attractive in appearance, like a small 5300 GT. The production Opel GT was designed by factory stylists and was less aggressive, but still beautiful. Bizzarrini then decided to build the car on his own. Around 17 prototypes were completed. The car is officially named as the Bizzarrini 1900 GT Europa. One of these cars has a barchetta ("little boat") body. Some cars are powered by 1.3 L and 1.6 L four-cylinder engines sourced from General Motors, Alfa Romeo and Fiat. There is even a highly developed racing version with a SPICA fuel injection system.

=== P538S ===
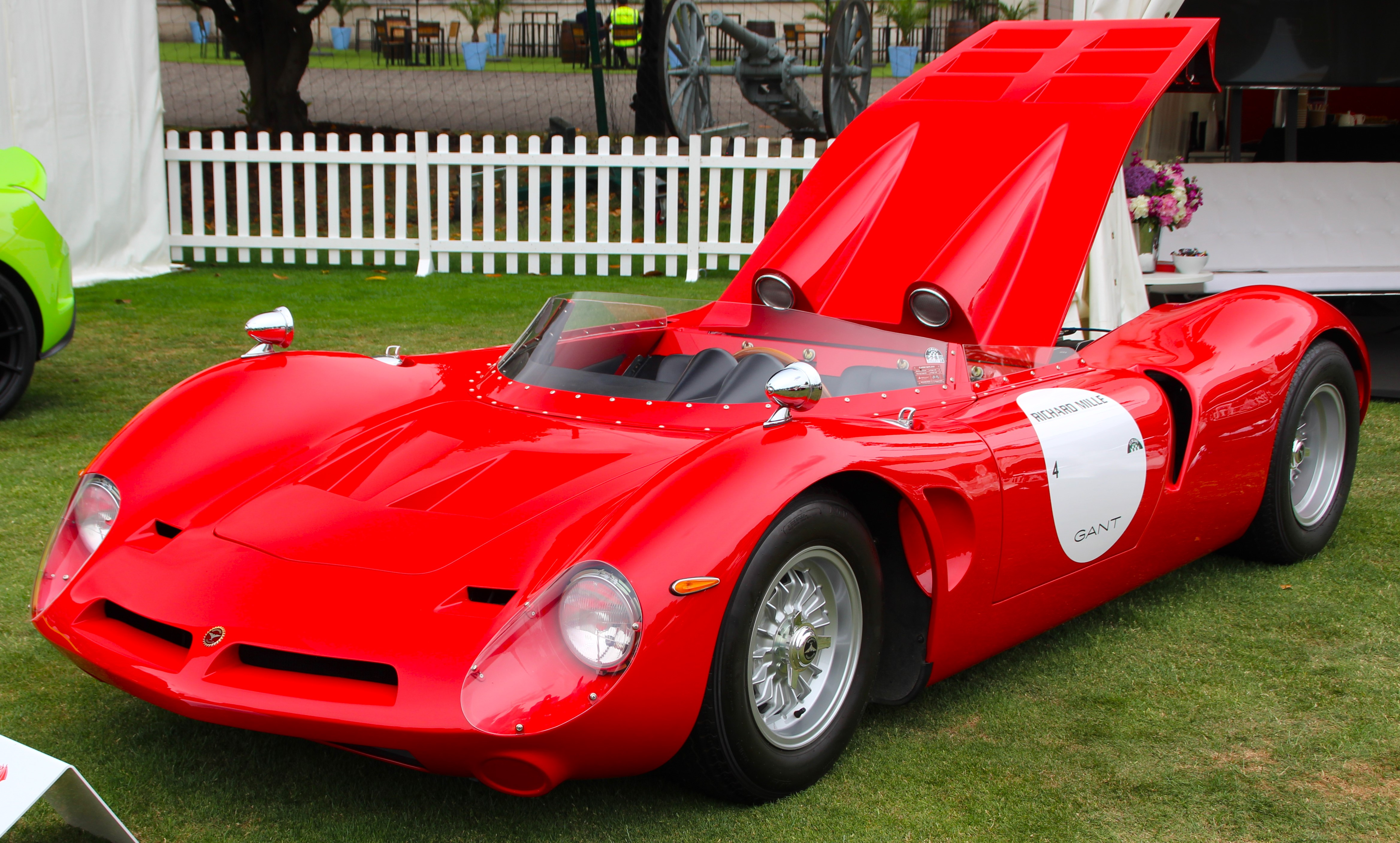
Bizzarrini P538

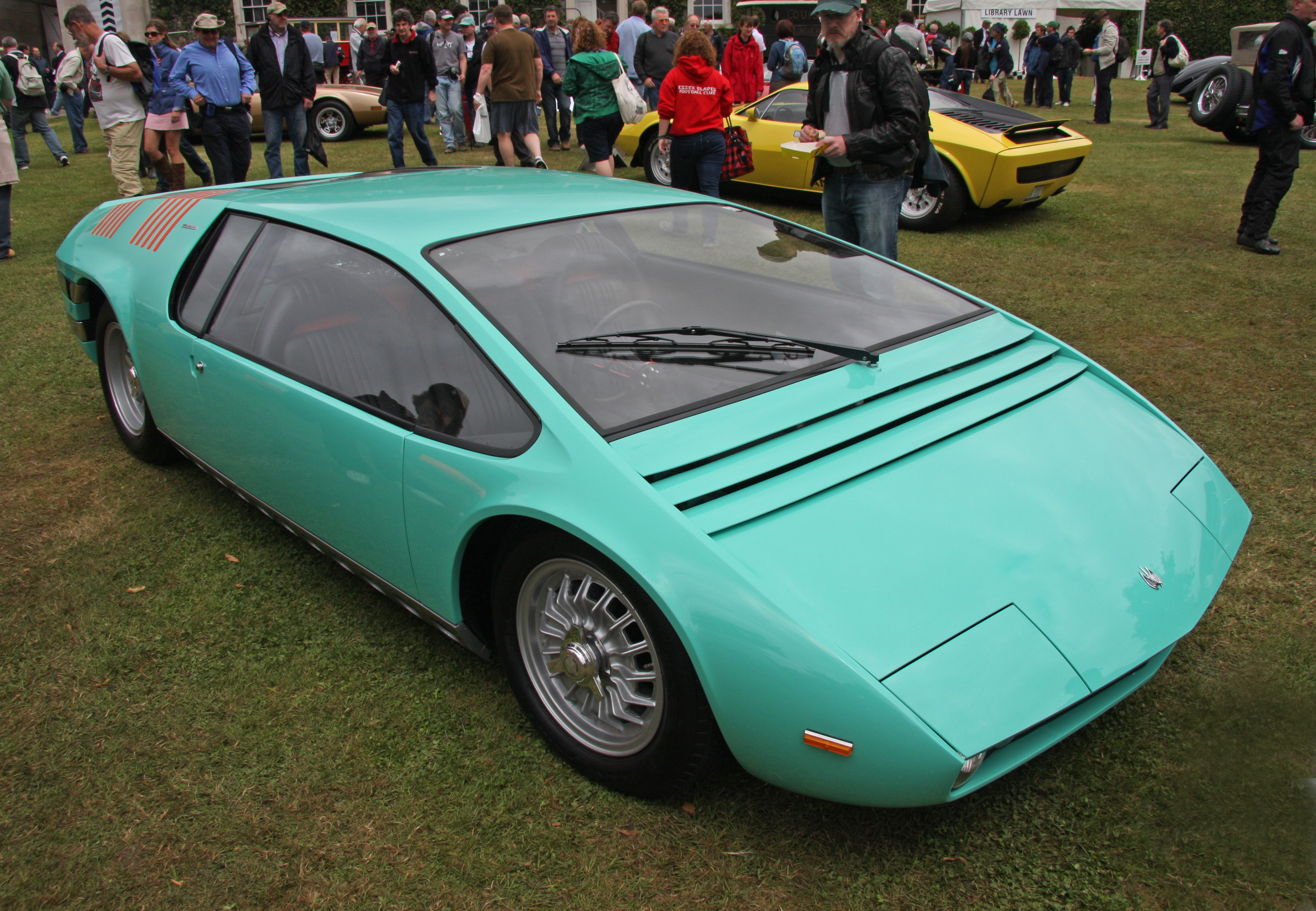
The custom-built Bizzarrini Manta

Bizzarrini's advanced ideas emerged again with the Bizzarrini P538S, P for posteriore, 53 for the 5300 cc Corvette engine, 8 for V8 engine and S for Sports car. The first V-12 car was ordered by American racer Mike Gammino.

This Barchetta raced in the 1966 Le Mans (DNF) and was even entered in 1967, but did not start (DNQ). In 1966, after a spin at the start line, it lasted less than a half an hour and retired due to a cracked oil line. During the short race time, the P538 was clocked as one of the fastest cars on the Mulsanne Straight.

In 1968, Giugiaro rebuilt one of the P538 bodies as the Bizzarrini Manta. After some years in Sweden, it was dismantled for an extensive restoration. Later featured in various classics car events, it is now in the United States.

== Post Bizzarrini S.p. A ==
=== AMX/3 ===
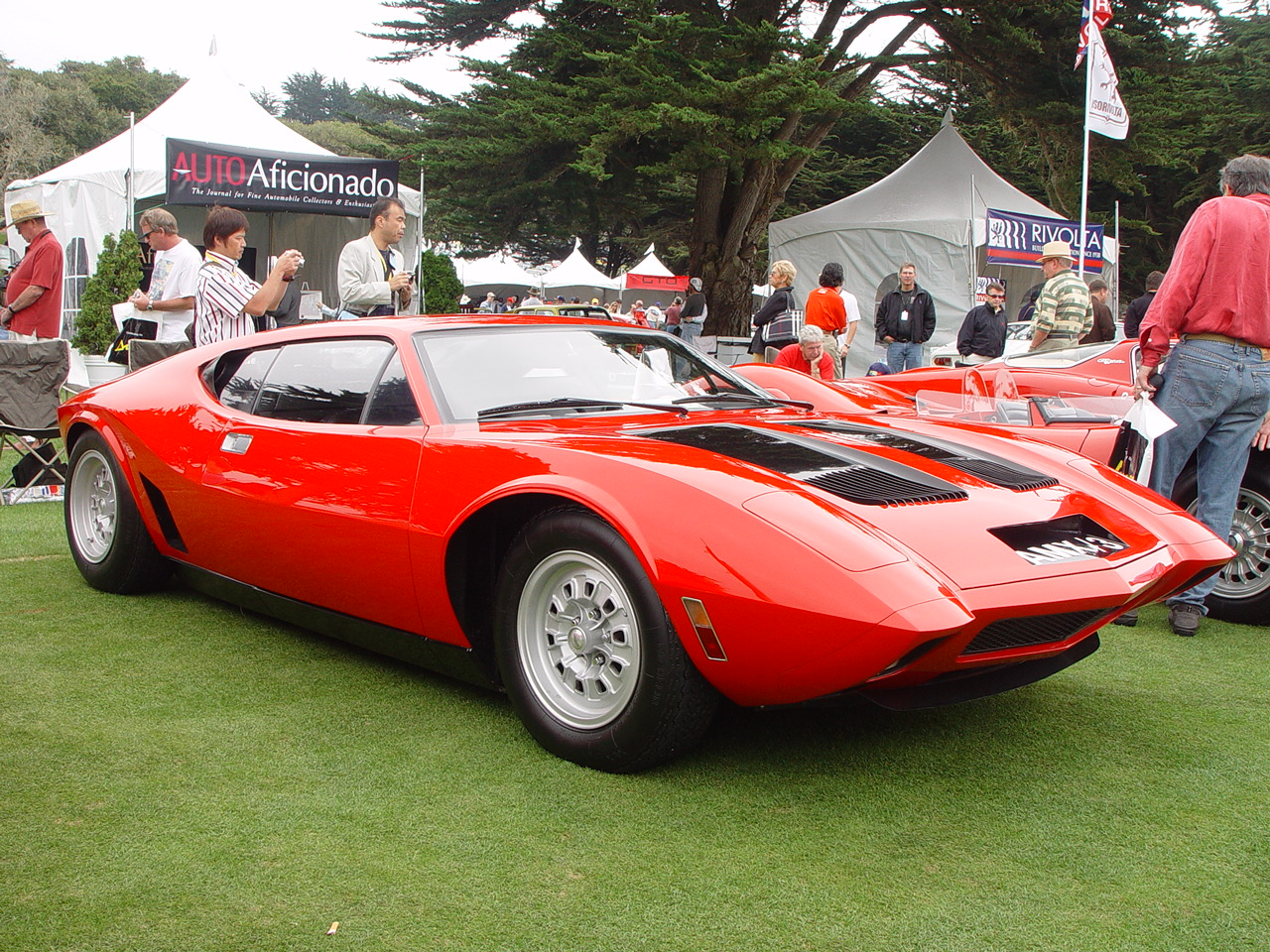
AMC AMX/3

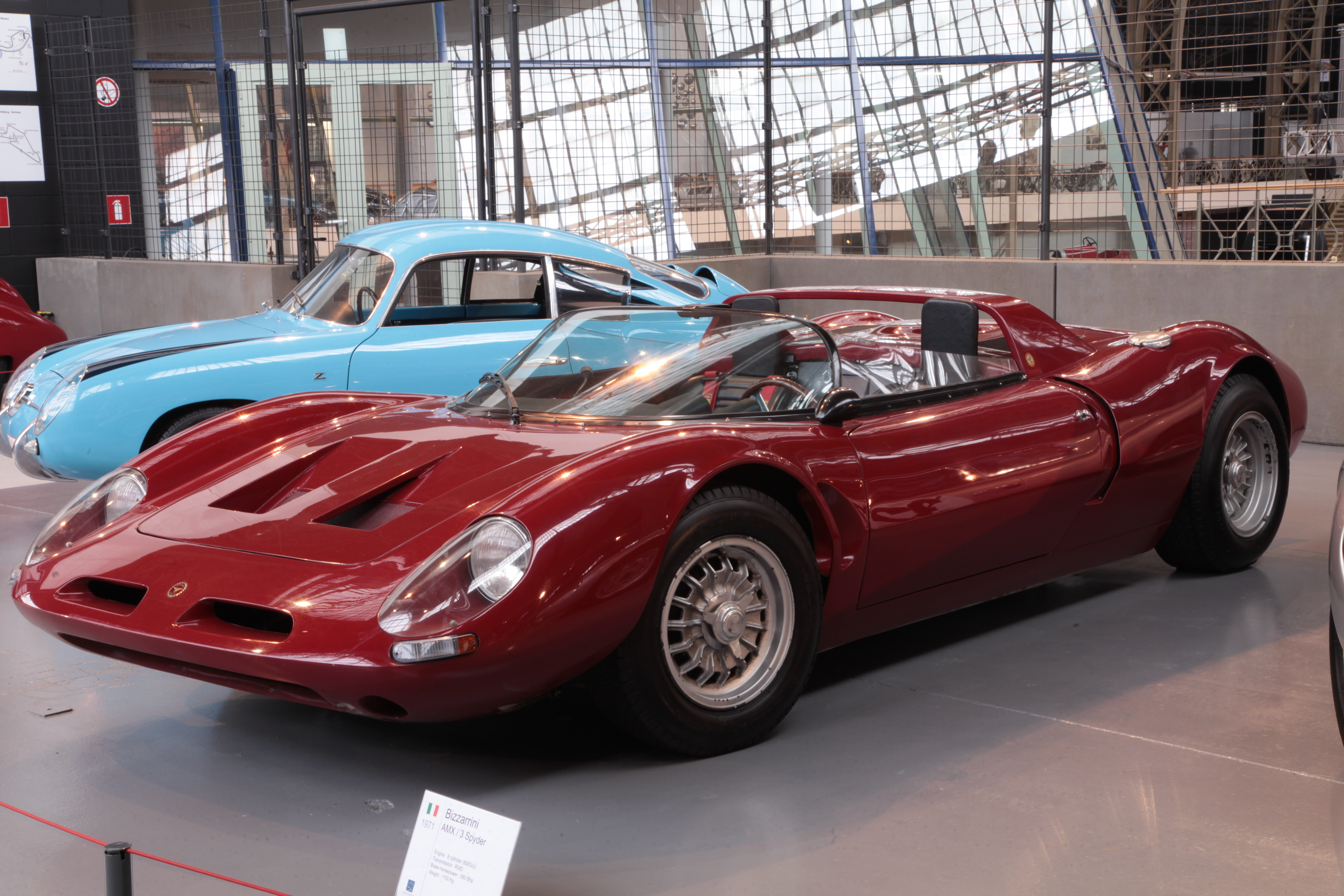
Bizzarrini AMX/3 Spider

Seven complete AMC AMX/3 cars and nine chassis are known to survive. Some remaining parts from the canceled, second group of five cars were used by erstwhile Bizzarrini collaborator Salvatore Diomante to assemble the sixth car, named and marketed as Sciabola. Bizzarrini used the 8th AMX/3 chassis to build the Iso Varedo. Additionally, an open two-seat Spider featuring no weather protection was built in the 1990s using an unfinished AMX/3 modified chassis and the 7th AMX/3, on display at the Autoworld Museum in Belgium, were both finished by Giorgio Giordanengo. This was the ultimate evolution of the P538 and Bizzarrini 5300 GT chassis.

=== P538S ===
Officially, three or four chassis were originally built in period, destined to race in the United States by Mike Gammino and Le Mans. Today, not less than a dozen (or more) chassis are in existence, some of these replicas claiming to be the real cars raced in Le Mans. At least two of the replicas are Lamborghini V12 powered. These V12 powered cars were truly the long-awaited Bizzarrini dream — his own engine and chassis.

=== BZ-2001 ===
In 1990, Bizzarrini was involved in the design of a one-off supercar model based on Ferrari Testarossa chassis and running gear with a carbon fiber body. The car was shown to the public for the first time at Pebble Beach in 1993. It was designed by a team led by car designer Barry Watkins, with the design being inspired by the Bizzarrini 5300 GT Spyder, although it is also considered to be the true successor to the P538. About 3 million dollars was invested to build the car, an astronomical amount for that time. The car was planned to be put in production, but it remained the only one ever produced. In 2021, the car was sold from a specialist and expert in Bizzarrini's cars to a Swiss collector.

=== Picchio Barchetta ===
In 1989 a group of young friends living in Ascoli Piceno, with a passion for motorsport, had the idea to establish a company constructing "copies" of the cars manufactured in the past by Giotto Bizzarrini. During their first encounter, Bizzarrini expressed a kind of animosity towards this idea; he refused to support the project and he turned the group of friends out. Nevertheless, their motivation was so strong that, after a short briefing of about half an hour, they presented an alternative proposal — to construct a sports car. The result was the Picchio Barchetta, powered by BMW engines. The cars were successfully raced in the Italian Hillclimb Championship and Italian Sport Championship.

=== Kjara ===
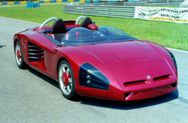
1998 Bizzarrini Kjara

The Kjara project was born in 1998. The Scuderia Bizzarrini built this sport barchetta in close collaboration with Leone Martellucci of University La Sapienza of Roma. The car is powered by a parallel hybrid propulsion system with a 2.5 litre TurboDiesel Lancia engine and a 40 kW (54 hp) AC electric drive; it was shown at Turin Auto Show in 2000.

In 2005, the Bizzarrini GT Strada 4.1 concept was shown at the Geneva Motor Show. This two-door GT with a 4.1-litre 550 bhp (410 kW; 558 PS) plant, producing a maximum speed 360 km/h (220 mph), 0–100 km/h in 3.8 seconds, planned for production in 2007. In 2008, the German designer, Stefan Schulze, proposed the Bizzarrini P358 Barchetta Prototype, a contemporary, ultra-light two-seater.

On October 23, 2012, the occasion of the inauguration of the University of Florence new Design Campus in Calenzano, Professor Giotto Bizzarrini was given the Honoris Causa Degree in Industrial Design.

== Refoundation ==
In 2020, the rights to the Bizzarrini name were acquired by Pegasus Brands. The reborn company announced plans to revive the marque with new models that acknowledge Giotto Bizzarrini's racing and design heritage.
