= Bizzarrini P538 =

Bizzarrini P538 Bizzarrini P538S
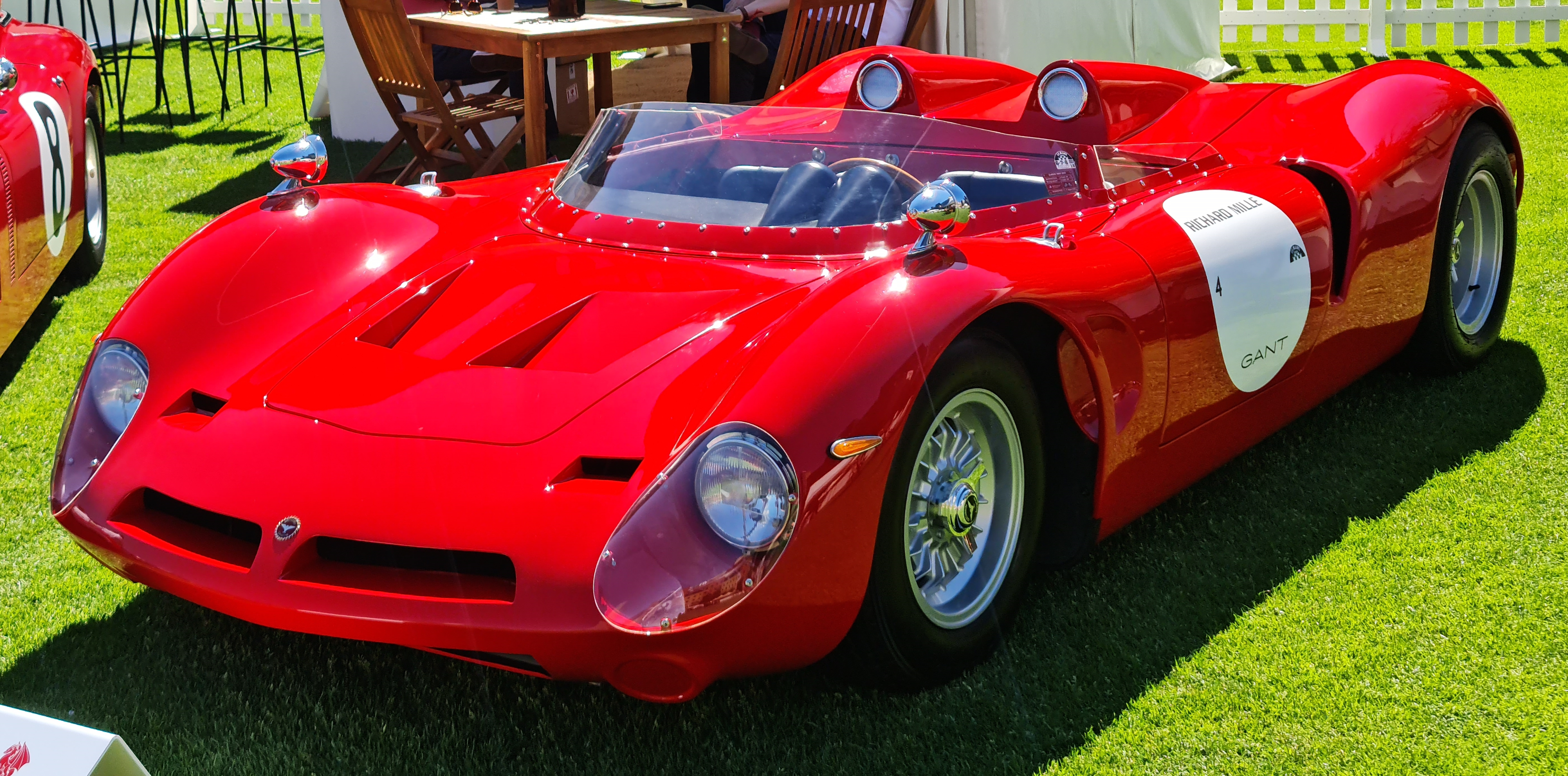

Overview
- Manufacturer: Scuderia Bizzarrini
- Production: 1966 (3 + 1 produced)
- Assembly: Livorno, Italy
- Designer: Giotto Bizzarrini

Body and chassis
- Class: race car
- Body style: 2-door barchetta
- Layout: rear mid-engine, rear-wheel-drive

Powertrain
- Engine: 5.4 L (327 cu in) Chevrolet small-block V8; 3.5 L–4.0 L Lamborghini V12
- Transmission: ZF 5-speed manual

Dimensions
- Wheelbase: 2,515 mm (99 in)
- Length: 3,998 mm (157 in)
- Width: 1,930 mm (76 in)
- Height: 830 mm (33 in)
- Curb weight: 950 kg (2,094 lb)

The P538 or P538S was a rear-engined race car launched in late 1965 or early 1966 by Scuderia Bizzarrini of Livorno, Italy.

The cars used five-speed manual transaxles with gearing specific to the race for which each car was constructed. Braking was via inboard four wheel disc brakes, with a fully independent suspension. The body was made of fiberglass over a tubular steel chassis.

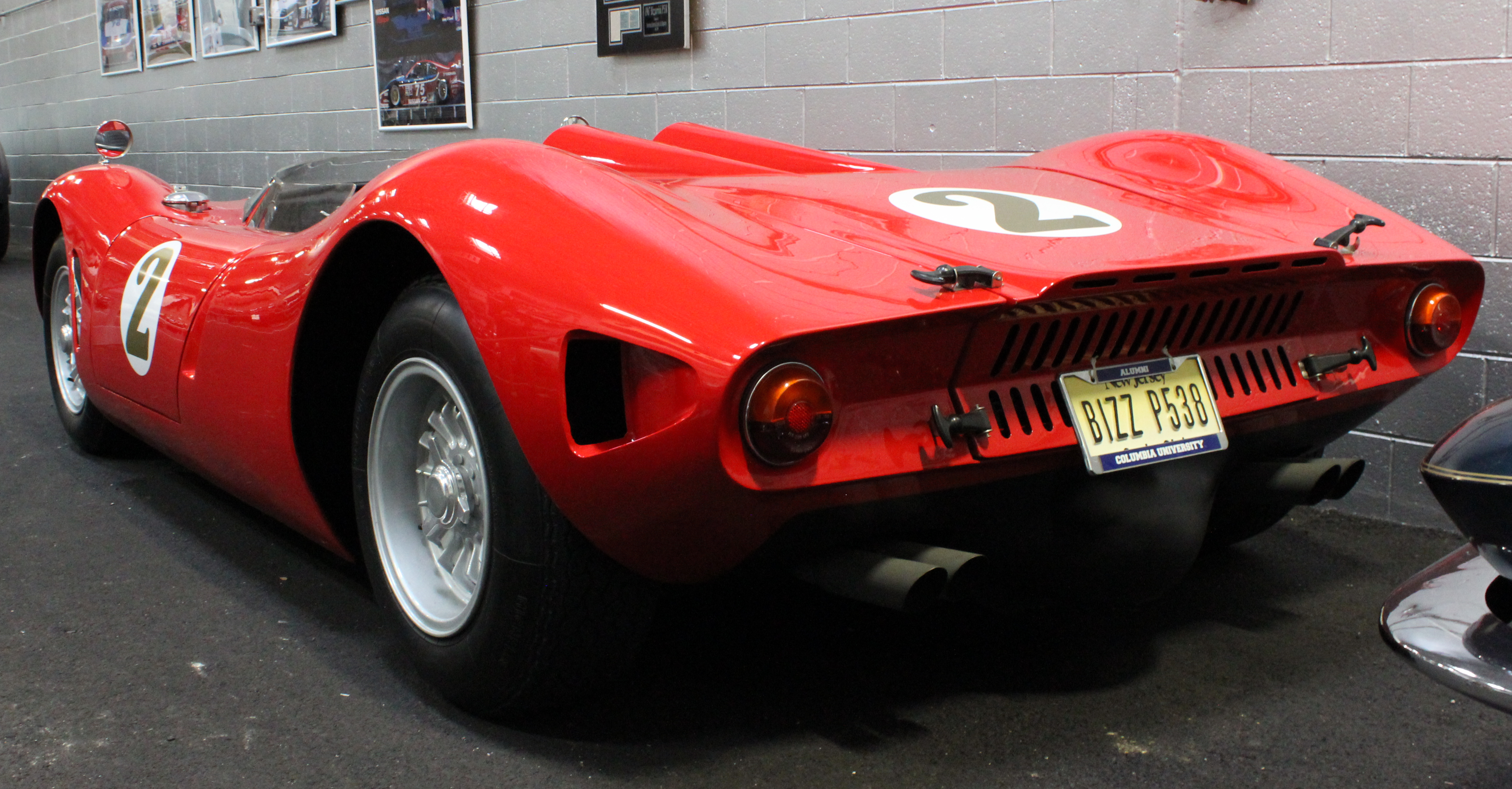
Rear view

Only 3 spider cars were produced by Bizzarrini. # P538*001, # P538*002 and # P538*003. #001 with Lamborghini V12 engine. That car crashed during tests and the history ended right there, because the chassis was cut up. The Lamborghini engine and running gear were removed and re-used on #002. #002 was supposed to drive at Le Mans in 1966 but that timeline was too ambitious. #002 was last reported being in the San Diego Automotive Museum (2017). #003 inherited some parts of the back end of the chassis of #001. This car had a Chevrolet V8 engine. It did start at Le Mans in 1966, with starting number # 10. It was entered in 2 more races (Mugello was one) later that year and thereafter received a plexiglass roof. It was entered as a Sport Prototype (unsuccessfully) as open cars were banned from Le Mans. Later the mechanical parts of #003 were parted out and used to build the Manta. The body was restored by Oliver Kuttner and a Chevrolet engine fitted. The car was second in class at Pebble Beach in 1990. Last known location; for sale at Automotive Collection, Las Vegas 2009. Then there is the white closed P538 Duca d' Aosta with chassis number # 262 974, but that car never had a spider body. So 3 spiders in red and 1 coupe built in white. These were the original P538's.

P538-003 debuted at Le Mans in 1966 with starting number #10 with Swiss driver Edgar Berney taking the first stint. It retired with a broken steering arm and a split oil pipe. A second team in a production-based Bizzarrini A3/C with starting number #11 with chassis number # BA4*106, driven by Sam Posey and Massimo Natili, was disqualified after a pit lane violation, possibly while returning with serious frame damage.

== Continuation P538s ==
Beginning in the mid-1970s and continuing at least through the 1990s, "continuation" cars were built. Amongst those building the cars, was former Bizzarrini engineer Salvatore Diomante at Autocostruzione SD, Torino. He began building "continuation" P538s on commission for private buyers. These may be distinguished from 1960s-built cars by the use of square as opposed to round tubing. Giotto Bizzarrini and his wife Rosanna assisted in the construction of some of the early "continuation" cars, and they were built using some original Sixties Bizzarrini components from the parts inventory. The first two cars of this "continuation" series using square-tube construction bear serial numbers #P538*400*001 and #P538*400*002; the first with a Lamborghini Islero V12 engine and the second with Lamborghini V12 engine with number #0127. Luciano Bertolero ordered these two cars. Diomante and others constructed an unknown number of these "continuation" cars, Diomante using original fiberglass body molds. At least 25 "continuation" cars are known today.
