= Bizzarrini Strada =

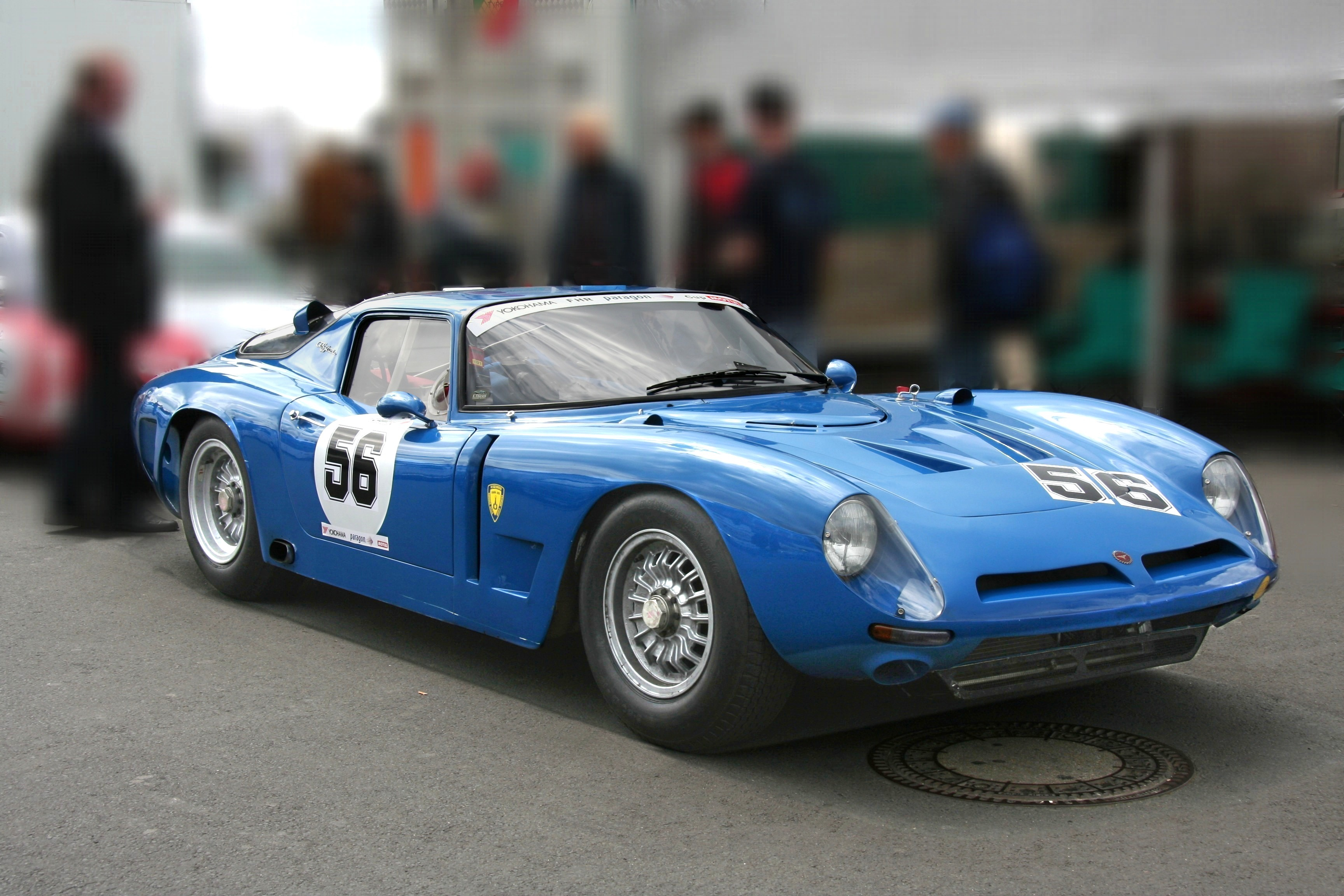

Overview
- Manufacturer: Bizzarrini
- Also called: Bizzarrini 5300 GT America; Bizzarrini 5300 GT Strada
- Production: 1964–1968; 133 built
- Assembly: Italy: Livorno
- Designer: Giotto Bizzarrini

Body and chassis
- Class: Sports car (S)
- Body style: 2–door coupé
- Layout: Front mid-engine, rear-wheel-drive
- Platform: Iso Rivolta IR 300
- Related: Iso Grifo

Powertrain
- Engine: 5.4 L (5,358 cc) Chevrolet 327 V8
- Transmission: 4–speed BorgWarner T-10 manual

Dimensions
- Wheelbase: 2,449 mm (96.4 in)
- Length: 4,460 mm (175.6 in)
- Width: 1,760 mm (69.3 in)
- Height: 1,120 mm (44.1 in)
- Kerb weight: 1,200 kg (2,646 lb)

The Bizzarrini Strada (also 5300 GT Strada and 5300 GT), is a sports car produced by Bizzarrini from 1964 to 1968. Sold as a low slung, two-seat coupé, roadster, and track-tuned "Corsa" racer, it proved to be Bizzarrini's most successful model.

== History ==
Designed by ex-Ferrari chief engineer Giotto Bizzarrini in 1963, the Strada was launched by his company in 1964. It was similar in concept to the Iso Grifo, also designed by Bizzarrini, and even used the Grifo name while in the planning stage, as well as the welded unibody platform of the Iso Rivolta 300.

The Strada – which adopted a Front mid-engine, rear-wheel-drive layout – was powered by a 327 Chevrolet small-block engine displacing 5.4 L (5,358 cc) and rated at 365 hp (272 kW) to 385 N⋅m (284 lb⋅ft) of torque in the road legal version and 400 hp (298 kW) in the Corsa. The engine was intentionally placed as far back over the front axle as possible, to improve weight distribution and handling. The car could accelerate 0–100 km/h (62 mph) in less than 7 seconds, and attained a top speed of 280 km/h (174 mph). In later models, the 5,358 cc engine was replaced by a larger 7,000 cc unit, fitted with a Holley carburetor.

Dunlop four-wheel disc brakes, a BorgWarner T-10 four-speed manual transmission, de Dion tube rear suspension, and limited slip differential were also used. The Giorgetto Giugiaro influenced Bertone styled aluminum body, was striking in its day and still regarded in the 21st century as "gorgeous" and an "absolute masterpiece".

A total of 133 examples were produced from 1964 through 1968.

=== America ===
A lower cost model called the 5300 GT America was developed for the US market, with a fibreglass body and a simplified rear axle. Rather than the Strada's De Dion setup, it has unequal length A-arms with coil springs and tubular shocks.

=== Spyder ===
The Bizzarrini 5300 GT S.I. Spyder was a series of three cars created in 1966 based on the Strada Chassis. They were designed under Ing. Giotto Bizzarrini supervision by mostly unknown carrozzeria Stile Italia (S.I.), D'Iseglio -Ex Engineer of (Berton) on via Governolo 28 in Torino, and built in cooperation with Sibona & Basano (SB) Ex-Chief Metalsmith & Ex Mold maker (Ghia) . The name Spyder had an "y" in it for marketing reasons, because it is not part of the Italian alphabet. The first appearance was at the Geneva Motor Show in 1966, after a traffic accident of the transporter who brought the car(s) to the show. Of the three Spyders built, one (the prototype) is painted silver where it is featured as the only (Prototype) automobile offered as a Coupe, Targa and is a full convertible Roadster, while the other two feature removable T-tops with a center bar running through the middle of the roof. The engine was a Chevrolet 327 V8 with four Weber carburetors. The Spyders also have other modifications to the bodywork, including subtly redesigned front ends and larger luggage compartments. A series of 100 examples had been planned, but only two found buyers.

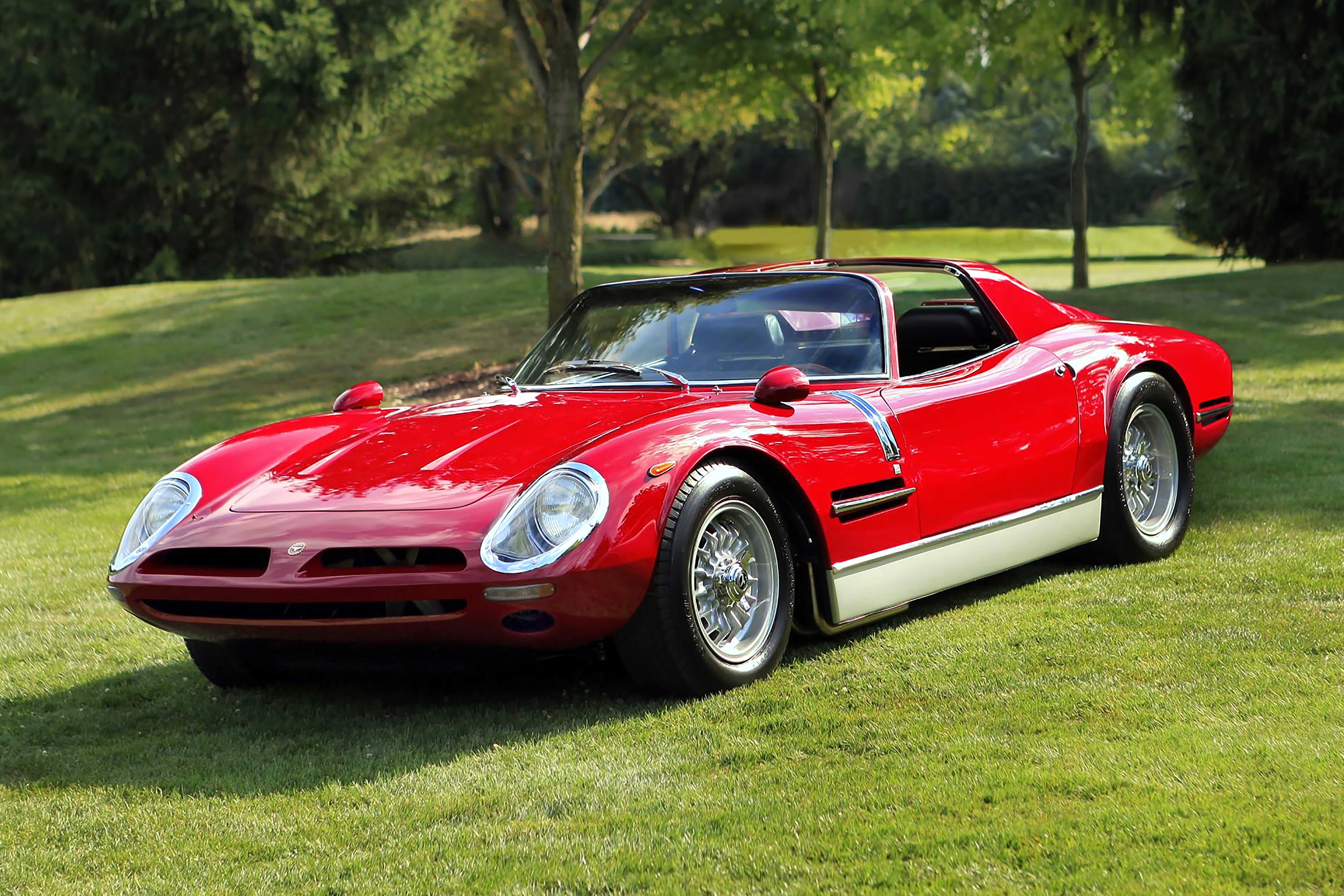
1968 Bizzarrini GT 5300 Spyder (SI) Chassis No. BA4*108* 1st and only production Spyder shipped to the USA in 1968

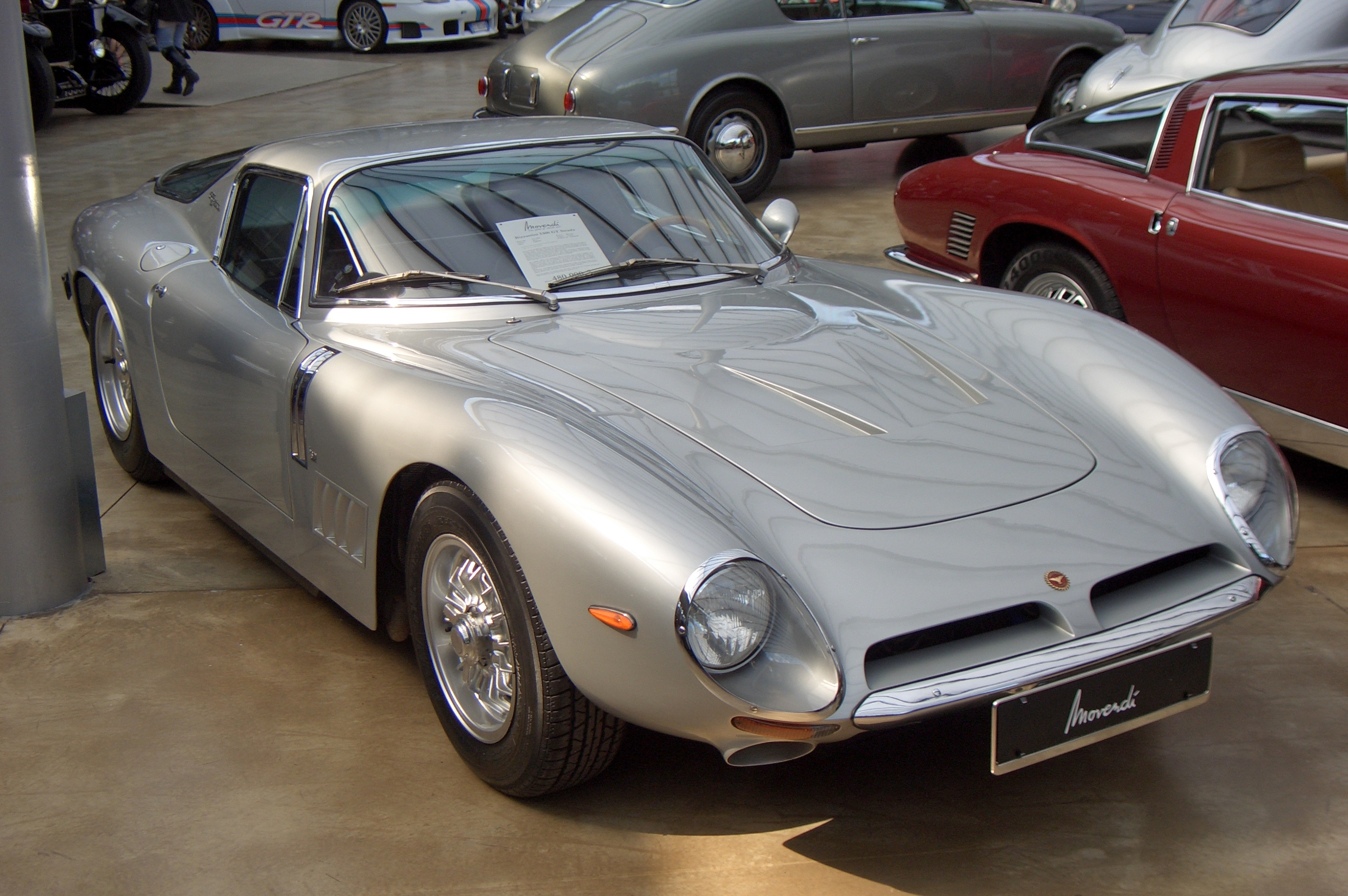
1966 Bizzarrini Strada

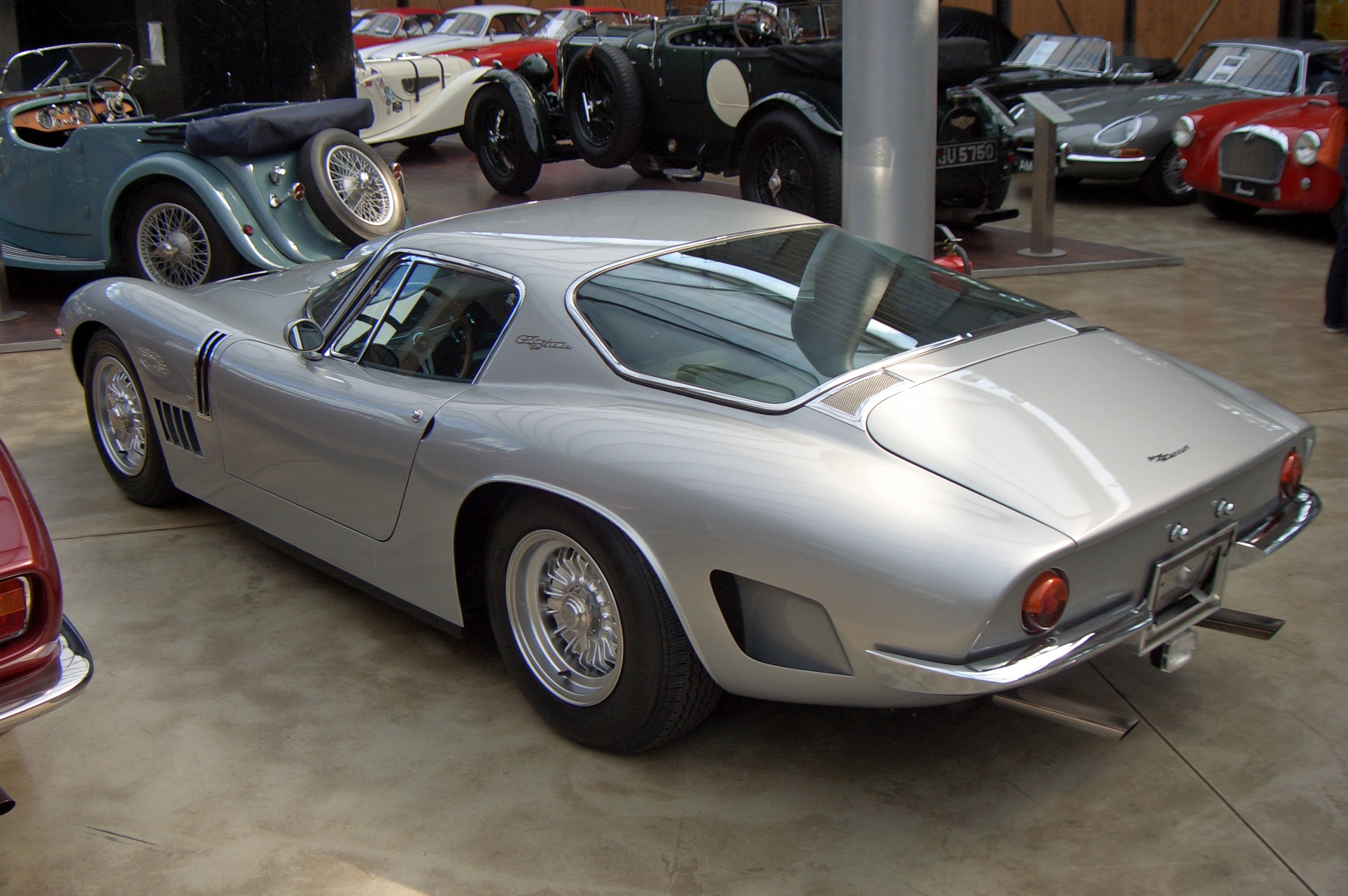
Rear view

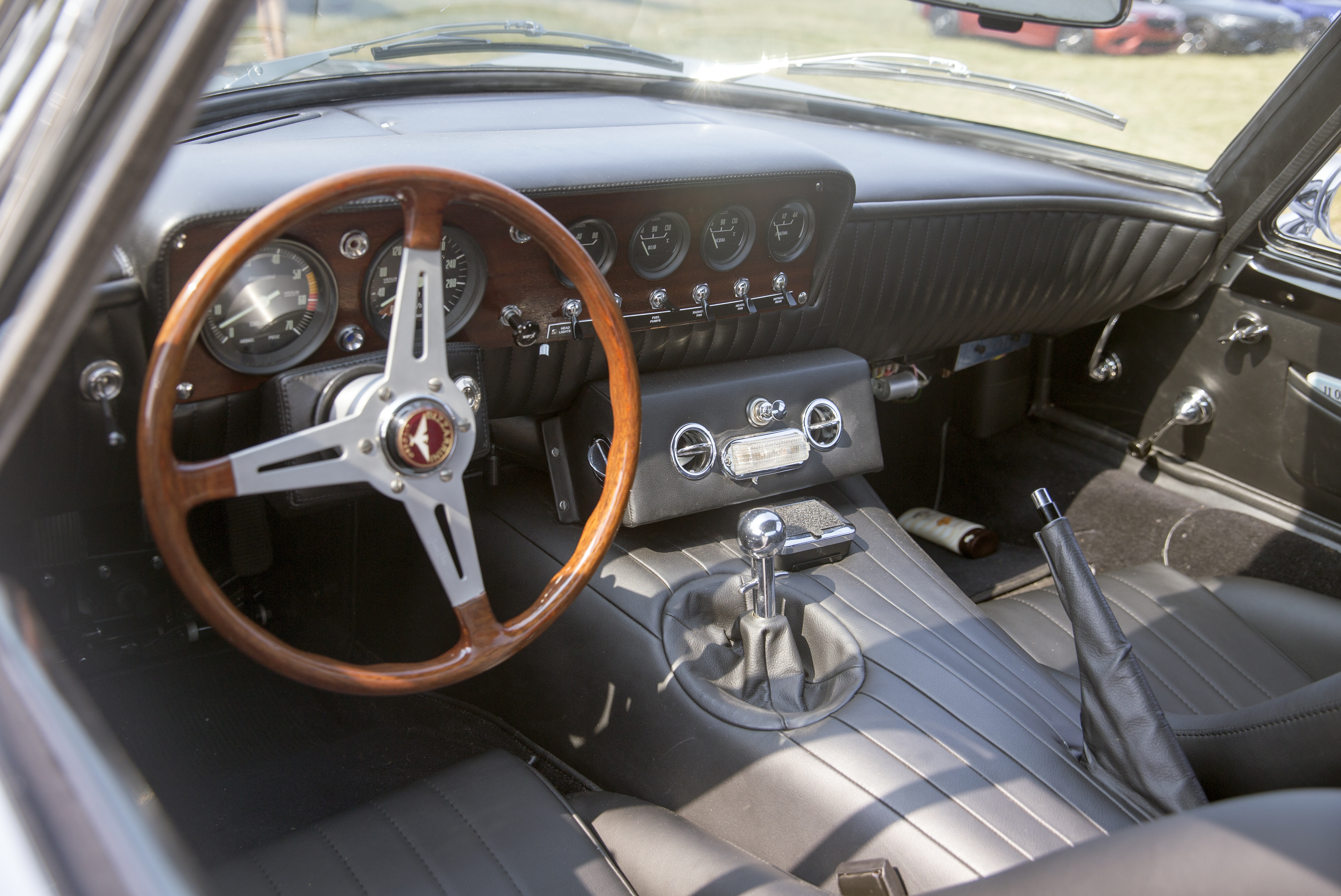
Interior

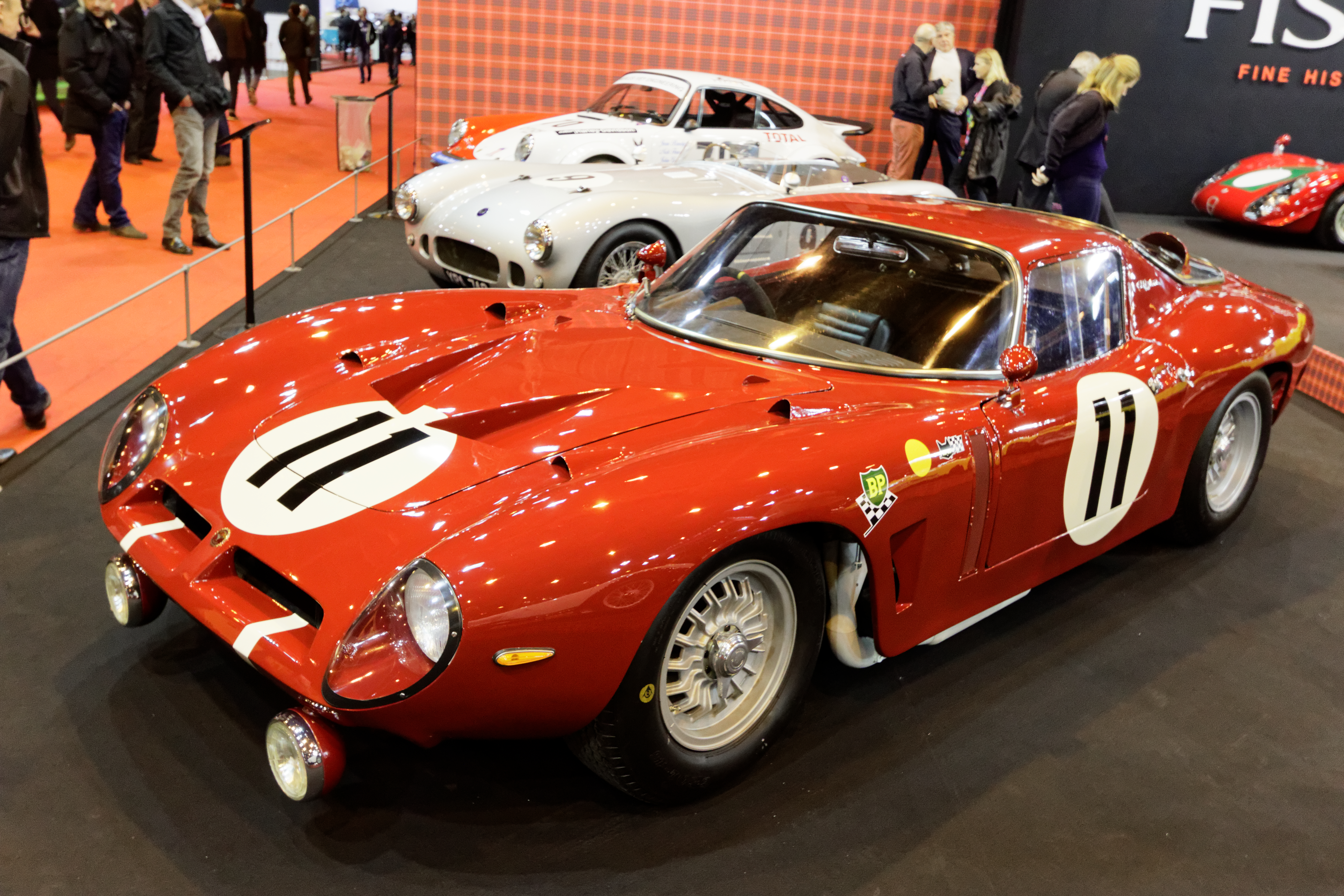
Bizzarrini 5300 GT Corsa (lightweight competition version)

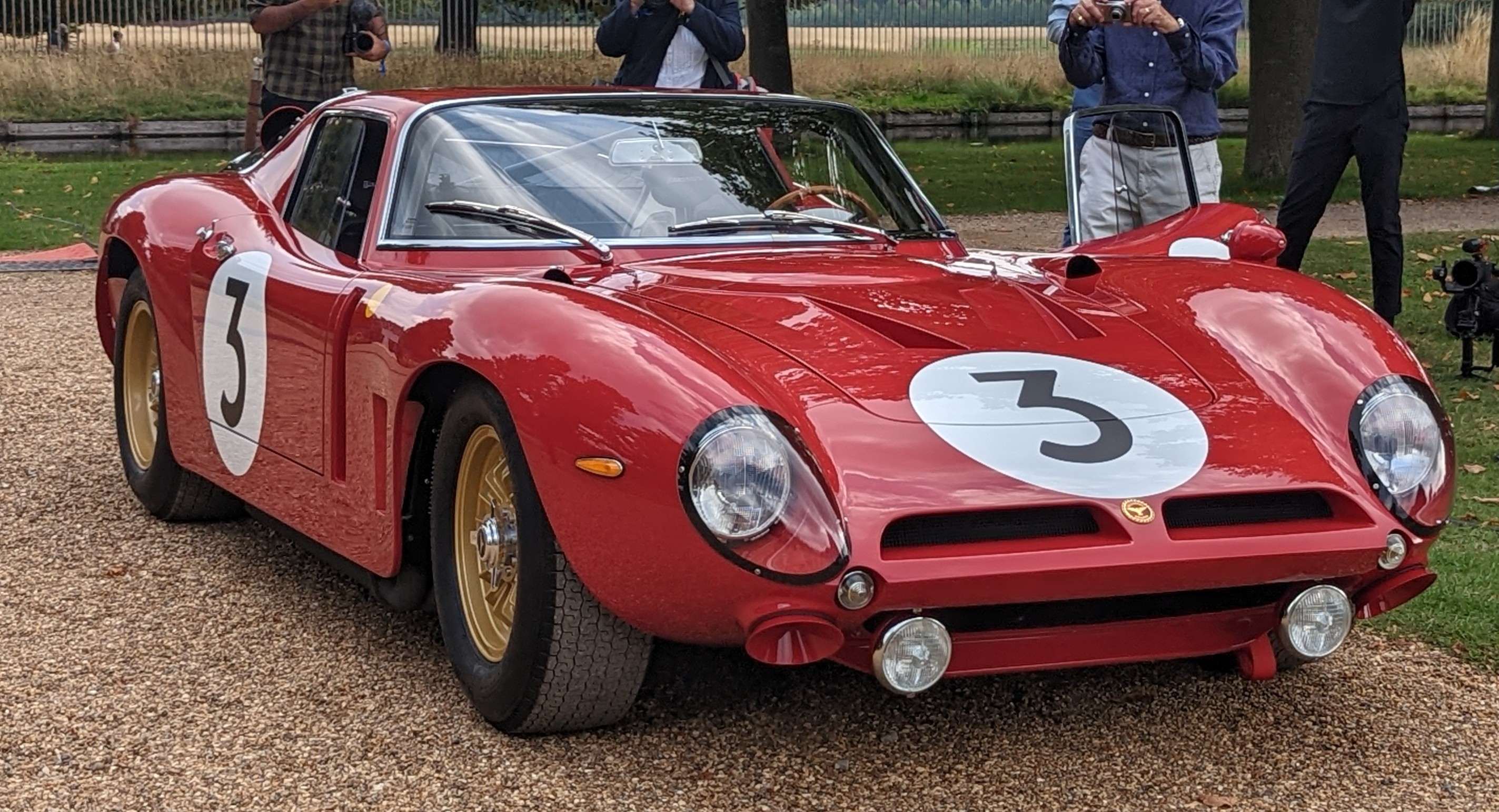
5300 GT Revival Corsa, a continuation series which entered production in 2022

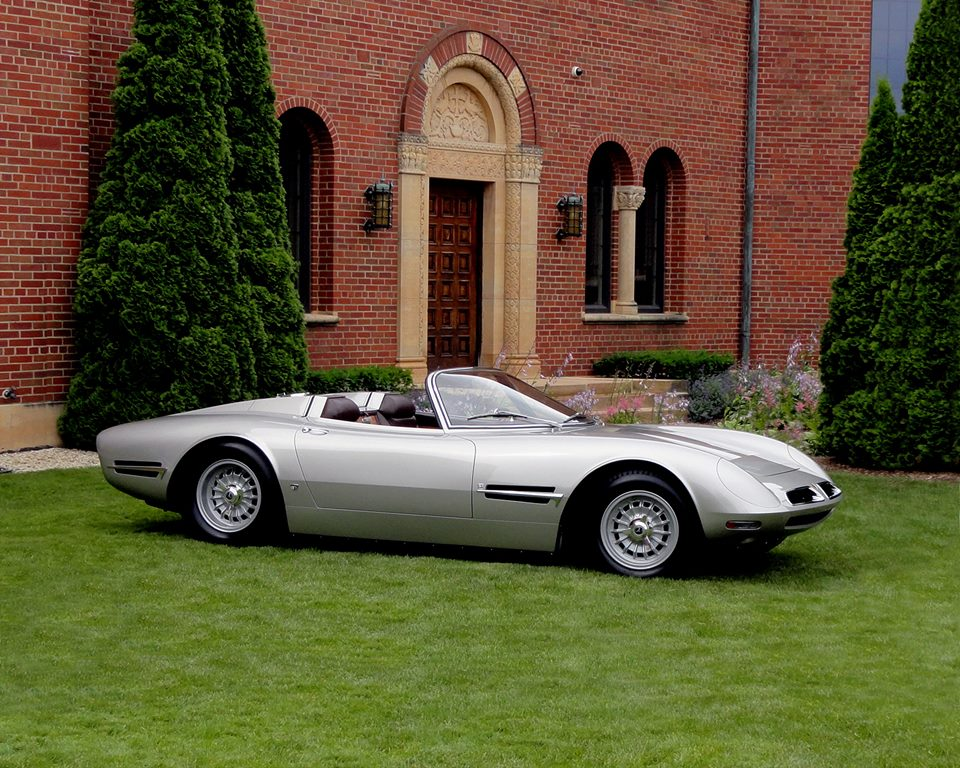
The sole 1966 Bizzarrini GT 5300 Spyder S.I (Prototype) Chassis# IA3*0245*

=== Competition models ===
In 1965, a Bizzarrini Grifo won its class at Le Mans and finished ninth overall. The lightweight, race oriented model was called the 5300 GT Corsa.

== See also ==
- Ferrari 250 GTO
- Iso Grifo
