= 1967 24 Hours of Daytona =

Sportscar endurance race

Previous: 1966	Next: 1968
Index: Races | Winners

The 1967 24 Hours of Daytona was an endurance sports car race that took place on 4 and 5 February 1967 at the 3.8-mile (6.1 km) Daytona International Speedway road course in Daytona Beach, Florida. It was the sixth running of the Daytona Continental endurance race, and the second time the event was held as a 24-hour race. It was also the opening round of the 1967 World Sportscar Championship.

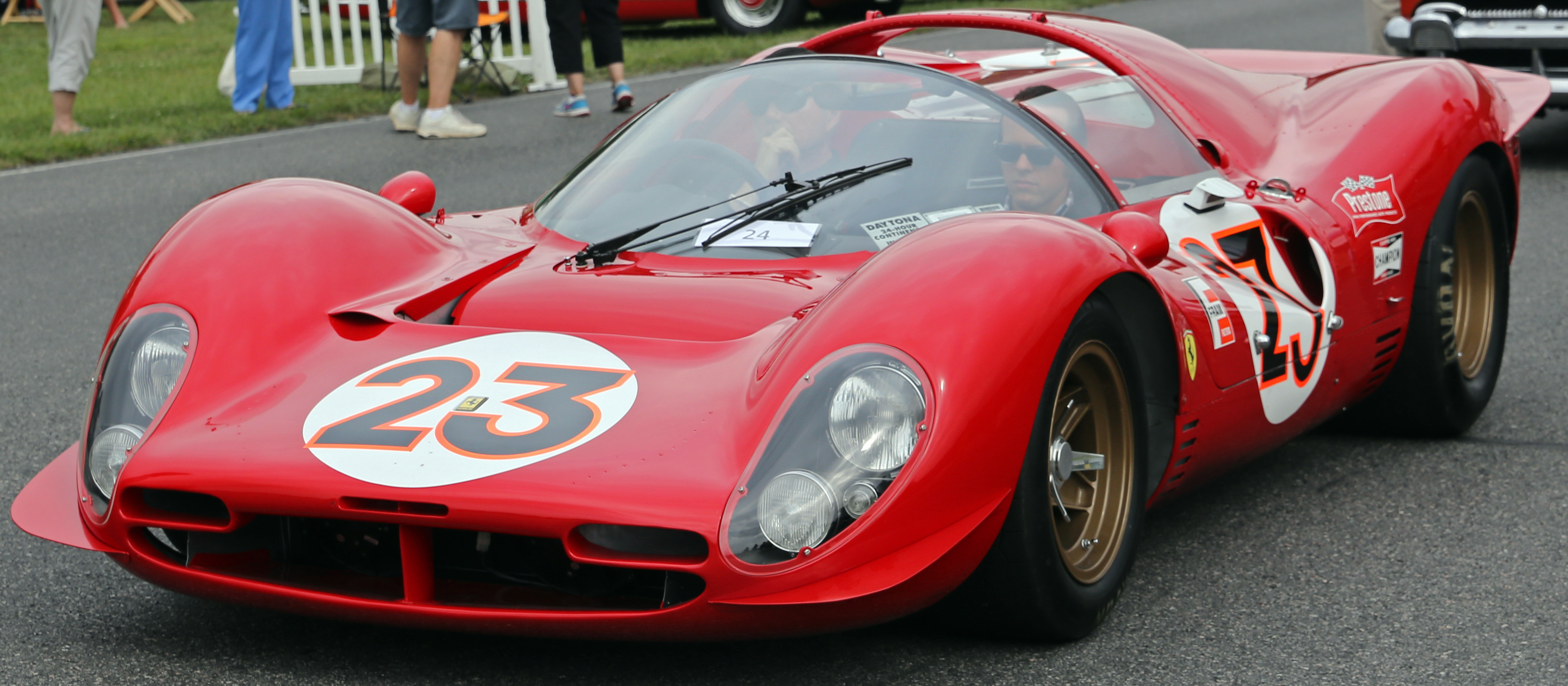
A replica of the winning Ferrari 330 P4

Chris Amon and Lorenzo Bandini won the race for Ferrari with its new 330 P4 model, leading a 1–2–3 finish for the marque.

== Race ==
In the 1960s, Ford and Ferrari were involved in an endurance racing rivalry, which arose after the Italian manufacturer refused to be bought by the Americans if Enzo Ferrari cannot keep control of the racing division. Thus, Ford decided to enter GT endurance racing in 1964, which eventually paid off in 1966 with victories at the 1966 24 Hours of Daytona, the 1966 12 Hours of Sebring and the 1966 24 Hours of Le Mans, as well as the overall victory in the 1966 World Sportscar Championship.

For the 24 Hours of Daytona in 1967, Ford entered as many cars as possible to maximize its chances of another victory. There were six factory cars at the start, three each from Shelby American and Holman & Moody, supplemented by a number of private entries. The factory teams used Mk.II Ford GT40s prototypes fitted with 7 liter NASCAR V8 engines, while the private teams participated with the regular Mk.I GT/sportscars models with the homologated smaller 4.7 liter V8 engine. However, Ferrari had not stood still in the winter of 1966 either. Technical director Mauro Forghieri was given complete freedom by team boss Enzo Ferrari to design new cars and engines. As a result, the team introduced the new Ferrari 330 P4, of which two examples were entered into the race: an open-top "Spyder" numbered 23 and a closed-top "Berlinetta" numbered 24. The former was an ex-P3 chassis converted to P4 specifications (sometimes referred to as a P3/4), while the latter was a brand new P4. In addition to the two works entries, privateer teams entered two 412 P models, which was a less sophisticated version of the P4 intended for customers. Despite the high costs, Ferrari traveled to Daytona for a test session in December 1966.

In qualifying, the Ford of Dan Gurney and A. J. Foyt took pole position, just two tenths ahead of the Chaparral 2F of Phil Hill and Mike Spence. Ferrari's first factory car, the No. 23 of Chris Amon and Lorenzo Bandini, started fourth, behind the private entry of Pedro Rodríguez and Jean Guichet. Immediately after the start, Hill took the lead, and after half an hour he had a twenty second lead over Gurney. Ford and Ferrari, meanwhile, focused on their own lap times and decided not to push hard for the lead unless the it increased to more than five laps.

After three hours the Chaparral spun and had to retire, allowing the No. 24 Ferrari of Mike Parkes and Ludovico Scarfiotti to take the lead. The other Chaparral of Bob Johnson and Bruce Jennings also had to abandon the race. Ford's cars suffered from many mechanical problems, such as defective seals and transaxles, and had to be brought in one by one for long pit stops or retirements. Ford's mechanics made more and more repairs, but eventually almost all of the manufacturer's cars had to retire. Gurney and Foyt had to have a transmission replaced and were still fifth, but six hours before the finish they also had to give up. The only Ford factory car that could still threaten Ferrari, the No. 1 of Bruce McLaren and Lucien Bianchi, had to significantly reduce its speed due to overheating. This entry eventually finished the race in seventh place, 73 laps behind the winner.

External image
- Ferraris cross the finish line three abreast

With half an hour remaining until the finish, three Ferraris occupied the first three positions, each separated by several laps. They reduced their speed so that they could cross the finish line side by side. This was in response to Ford's photo finish at the 1966 24 Hours of Le Mans. Unlike in that race, where the two leading Fords had completed the same number of laps, the leading No. 23 Ferrari was three laps ahead of the second-placed No. 24 entry, while the NART-entered 412 P finished a further 26 laps behind in third. The photo taken of this finish was kept in Enzo Ferrari's office for a long time. The first Ford, the private J. W. Automotive entry of Dick Thompson and Jacky Ickx, finished sixth, behind two Porsches with much smaller engines. The race is referred to as "Enzo's revenge" by various media outlets. Ferrari led for more than twenty hours during the entire race.

== Official results ==
=== Finishers ===
Pos	Class	No	Team	Drivers	Chassis	Laps
1	P + 2.0	23	(Italy) Ferrari s.p.a.	(Italy) Lorenzo Bandini (New Zealand) Chris Amon	Ferrari 330 P4	666
2	P + 2.0	24	(Italy) Ferrari s.p.a.	(United Kingdom) Mike Parkes (Italy) Ludovico Scarfiotti	Ferrari 330 P4	663
3	P + 2.0	26	(United States) North American Racing Team	(Mexico) Pedro Rodríguez (France) Jean Guichet	Ferrari 412P	637
4	P 2.0	52	(Germany) Porsche of Stuttgart	(Germany) Hans Herrmann (Switzerland) Joseph Siffert	Porsche 910	618
5	P 2.0	55	Squadra Tartaruga Switzerland	(Switzerland) Dieter Spoerry (Switzerland) Rico Steinemann	Porsche 906LH	608
6	S + 2.0	11	(United Kingdom) J. W. Automotive	(United States) Dick Thompson (Belgium) Jacky Ickx	Ford GT40	601
7	P + 2.0	1	(United States) Shelby American	(New Zealand) Bruce McLaren (Belgium) Lucien Bianchi	Ford GT40	593
8	S + 2.0	20	(United States) William Wonder Inc.	(United States) William Wonder (United States) Raymond Caldwell	Ford GT40	573
9	GT 2.0	54	(United States) RBM Motors	(United States) Jack Ryan (United States) Bill Bencker	Porsche 911S	555
10	T 2.0	61	(United States) George Drolsom	(United States) George Drolsom (United States) Harold Williamson	Porsche 911S	542
11	T + 2.0	72	(United States) Ring Free Oil Racing Team	(United States) Paul Richards (United States) Ray Cuomo (United States) John Norwood	Ford Mustang	526
12	T + 2.0	19	(United States) Howmet Corp.	(United States) Ray Heppenstall (United States) Bill Seeley	Ford Falcon	518
13	GT 2.0	73	(United States) Peter Marinelli	(United States) John Tremblay (United States) Larry B. Perkins	Volvo P1800	500
14	GT + 2.0	43	(United States) Cannons Auto Service	(United States) Dana Kelder (United States) Ara Dube	Triumph TR4A	499
15	T + 2.0	21	(United States) Brock Yates	(United States) Brock Yates (United States) Charles Krueger	Dodge Dart	498
16	T + 2.0	66	(United States) Tom Yeager	(United States) Tom Yeager (United States) Walt Hane (United States) Peter Feistman	Ford Mustang	498
17	GT 2.0	86	(United States) Kenneth G. Chambliss	(United States) Bill Eve (United States) Ernie Croucher (United States) Pete Glenn	MGB	493
18	GT + 2.0	42	(United States) Cannons Auto Service	(United States) Steven Sommer (United States) Guido Levetto	Triumph TR4A	491
19	T 2.0	75	(United States) Ike Maxwell	(United States) Ike Maxwell (United States) William Martin	Volvo 122S	485
20	T + 2.0	71	(United States) Ring Free Oil Racing Team	(United Kingdom) Anita Taylor (United States) Smokey Drolet (United States) Janet Guthrie	Ford Mustang	484
21	S + 2.0	32	(United Kingdom) Peter Clarke	(United Kingdom) Peter Clarke (United Kingdom) Edward Nelson	Ferrari 250LM	484
22	T 2.0	89	(United States) Ross Bremer	(United States) Ross Bremer (United States) Don Kearney (United States) Billy Turner	Ford Cortina Lotus	477
NC	T 2.0	77	(United States) Precision Auto Inc.	(United States) John Bentley (United States) Brian Beddow	Alfa Romeo GTA	465
NC	P 2.0	96	(United States) Jim Baker	(United States) Donna Mae Mims (United States) Suzy Dietrich	ASA 411	459
NC	P 2.0	84	(United States) Jim Baker	(United States) Dick Ganger (United States) Al Weaver (United States) Ken Goodman	MGB GT	406
NC	T 2.0	74	(United States) Arthur Mollin Racing Ent.	(United States) Arthur Mollin (United States) Art Riley	Volvo 122S	400
NC	T 2.0	90	(United States) Del Russo Taylor	(United States) Del Russo Taylor (United States) Bob Pratt (United States) Charles Lyon	Alfa Romeo GTA	360
NC	GT + 2.0	46	(United States) Richard Robson	(United States) Richard Robson (United States) Rajah Rodgers (United States) Bill Buchman	Jaguar XKE	320
NC	GT + 2.0	48	(United States) Atlas Van Lines	(United States) Tim Burr (United States) Buell Owen (United States) Clint Cavin	Triumph TR4	264

=== Did not finish ===
Class	No	Team	Drivers	Chassis	Laps
P + 2.0	3	(United States) Shelby American	(United States) A. J. Foyt (United States) Dan Gurney	Mercury GT40	464
T + 2.0	36	(United States) Roger Penske	(United States) George Wintersteen (United States) Joe Welch (United States) Bob Brown	Chevrolet Camaro	456
P + 2.0	33	(Belgium) Écurie Francorchamps	(Belgium) Willy Mairesse (Belgium) Jean Blaton	Ferrari 412P	401
GT + 2.0	18	(United States) Roger West	(United States) Roger West (United States) Bobby Allison	Shelby GT350	343
P 2.0	34	(United States) Harrah Modern Classic Motors	(United States) Charlie Kolb (United States) John Fulp	Ferrari Dino 206S	341
P + 2.0	28	(United States) North American Racing Team	(France) Jo Schlesser (United States) Masten Gregory (United States) Peter Gregg	Ferrari 365P2	338
P + 2.0	14	(United States) Chaparral Cars Inc.	(United States) Bob Johnson (United States) Bruce Jennings	Chaparral 2D	334
GT + 2.0	67	(United States) Dos Caballos Racing Inc.	(Mexico) Fred van Beuren (United States) Paul Jett (United States) Don Pike	Shelby GT350	313
T + 2.0	76	(United States) John McComb	(United States) John McComb (United States) Dave Dooley	Ford Mustang	312
P + 2.0	31	(United Kingdom) David Piper	(United Kingdom) David Piper (United Kingdom) Richard Attwood	Ferrari 365P2/3	311
P + 2.0	6	(United States) Holman & Moody	(United States) Lloyd Ruby (New Zealand) Denis Hulme	Ford GT40	299
P + 2.0	5	(United States) Holman & Moody	(United States) Mario Andretti (United States) Richie Ginther	Ford GT40	298
P + 2.0	2	(United States) Shelby American	(United States) Ronnie Bucknum (Australia) Frank Gardner	Ford GT40	274
T + 2.0	40	(Canada) Craig Fisher	(Canada) Craig Fisher (Canada) George Eaton	Chevrolet Camaro	258
P + 2.0	4	(United States) Holman & Moody	(United States) Mark Donohue (United States) Peter Revson	Mercury GT40	236
P 2.0	51	(Germany) Porsche of Stuttgart	(Germany) Gerhard Mitter (Austria) Jochen Rindt	Porsche 906E	194
T + 2.0	16	(United States) Joie Chitwood	(United States) Joie Chitwood junior (United States) Jack McClure	Chevrolet Camaro	186
GT + 2.0	45	(United States) Joe Hines	(United States) C. C. Canada (United States) Joe Hines (United States) T. J. Kelly	Triumph TR4	186
P 2.0	53	(Germany) Porsche of Stuttgart	(Germany) Udo Schütz (Germany) Rolf Stommelen (Netherlands) Gijs van Lennep	Porsche 906	170
S 2.0	56	(Switzerland) Charles Vögele	(Switzerland) Charles Vögele (Switzerland) Walter Habegger	Porsche 906LH	146
GT + 2.0	29	(Mexico) Pedro Rodríguez	(Mexico) Carlos Salas Guterrez (Mexico) Hector Rebaque senior	Ferrari 275 GTB/C	136
P 2.0	47	(United States) Fred Opert Racing	(United Kingdom) Peter Gethin (United States) Fred Opert (United States) Roy Pike	Chevron B4	106
S + 2.0	9	(Italy) Brescia Racing Corse	(Italy) Umberto Maglioli (Italy) Mario Casoni	Ford GT40	93
P + 2.0	15	(United States) Chaparral Cars	(United States) Phil Hill (United Kingdom) Mike Spence	Chaparral 2F	93
P + 2.0	8	(United States) Jim White Chevrolet Inc.	(United States) Tony Denman (United States) Bob Brown	Chevrolet Corvette Grand Sport	72
T 2.0	82	(United States) Harry Theodoracopulos	(United States) Harry Theodoracopulos (United States) Sam Posey (United States) Jim Haynes	Alfa Romeo GTA	69
S + 2.0	7	(United States) Herb Byrne	(United States) Herb Byrne (United States) Dick Thetford (United States) Russell Beazell	Shelby Cobra	56
GT + 2.0	44	(United States) Ray Stoutenburg	(United States) Ray Stoutenburg (United States) James Taylor (United States) Roger McCluskey	Triumph TR4A	22
T 2.0	87	(United States) Chet Freeman	(United States) Chet Freeman (United States) Al Weaver (United States) John Marshall	Ford Cortina Lotus	18
GT 2.0	63	(United States) Dockery Ford Inc.	(United States) Bob Grossman (United States) Martin Krinner	Shelby GT350	1

=== Did not start ===
Class	No	Team	Drivers	Chassis
T + 2.0	22	(United States) JoKar Racing Associates	(United States) Frank Karmatz (United States) Raymond Caldwell	Plymouth Barracuda
S 2.0	58	(United Kingdom) Rod Savyer	(United Kingdom) Tony Dean (United Kingdom) Trevor Taylor	Porsche 906
T 2.0	85	(United States) Jim Baker	(United States) Ken Goodman (United States) Jim Baker	Alfa Romeo GTA

World Sportscar Championship
Previous race: 1966 500 km of Zeltweg	1967 season	Next race: 12 Hours of Sebring
