= 1966 Targa Florio =

The 50° Targa Florio took place on 8 May 1966, on the Circuito Piccolo delle Madonie, Sicily (Italy).

== Race ==
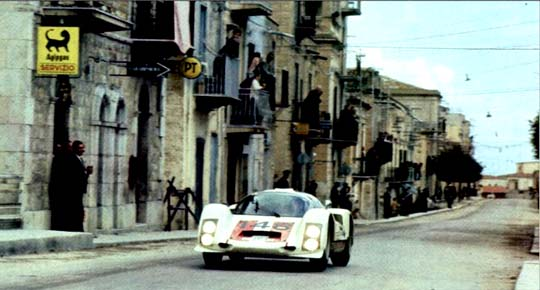
The winning Porsche 906 of Mairesse/Müller

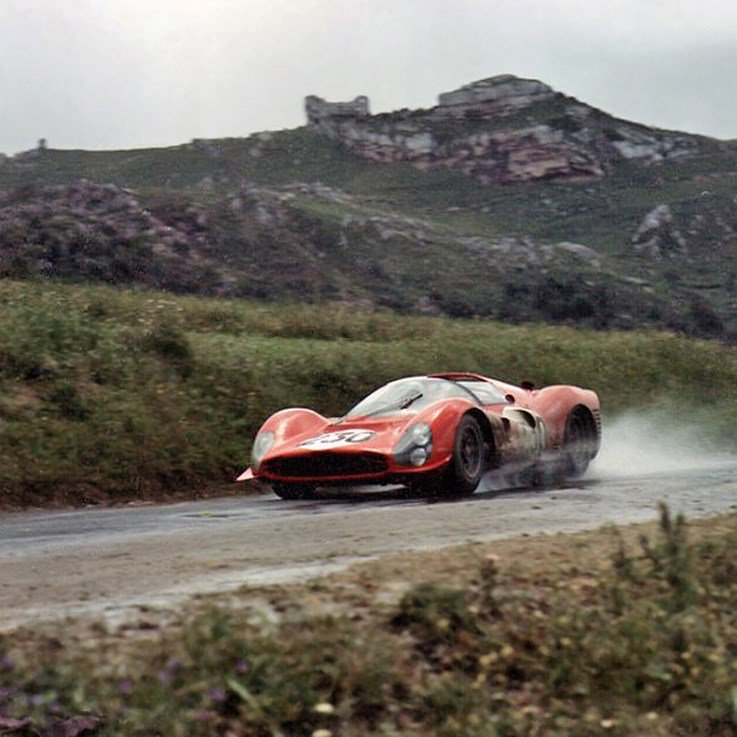
The new Ferrari 330 P3 of Vaccarella/Bandini before retiring

The 50th anniversary edition of the Targa was marred by an inclement weather that turned the road into a quagmire. The winners of the 1965 edition, Nino Vaccarella and Lorenzo Bandini started as favorites driving the powerful, 4-litre P+2.0 large prototype-class Ferrari 330 P3 even though they qualified only second, at 39:07,100 narrowly beaten by the 39:05,700 of Günter Klass in a Porsche 906-8 with a 2.2-litre Flat-8 Typ771/2 engine. In the race, several Porsche 906 challenged for the overall lead, as well as in three classes, 2-litre sportscar, prototype, and big prototype class. It was the fuel injected 906E prototype of Gerhard Mitter that clocked the fastest race lap Indeed, it seemed the local heroes could led Ferrari to another victory but three laps from the end, after refueling at the Polizzi intersection and trying to regain the lead from Porsches, a wrong manoeuvrer by Bandini while lapping a slower car resulted in the 330P3 off the road. The two Porsche prototypes with Mitter and Klass fighting for the lead managed to eliminate each other, thus Porsche lost wins and championships points in both prototype classes.

This paved the way of the victory for the factory-backed but privately entered Scuderia Filipinetti Porsche 906 of Herbert Müller and Willy Mairesse which was a 2-litre sportscar, winning a class that was dominated by Porsche anyway due to numerous privateers. The second place of the Dino 206 S of Guichet/Baghetti scored the important 2 litre prototype class win ahead of the 906 of Sicilian duo Pucci/Arena. With both factory Ferrari V12 and Porsche F8 in the over 2 litre prototype class having crashed, a private Ferrari 250 LM that had received an enlarged engine won the big prototype class with overall rank 17, thus earning full championships points without an outright win, tying Ferrari and Ford at two wins. The lone Ford GT40 Mk.I had been entered as sportscar and won its class and points unchallenged.

== Official results ==
Pos	Class	No	Team	Drivers	Chassis	Laps
1	S 2.0	148	(Switzerland) (Germany) Scuderia Filipinetti/Porsche System Engineering	(Switzerland) Herbert Müller (Belgium) Willy Mairesse	Porsche 906	10
2	P 2.0	196	(Italy) Ferrari SEFAC	(France) Jean Guichet (Italy) Giancarlo Baghetti	Dino 206 S	10
3	S 2.0	144	(Germany) Porsche System Engineering	(Italy) Antonio Pucci (Italy) Vincenzo Arena	Porsche 906	10

World Sportscar Championship
Previous race: 1000 km Monza	1966 season	Next race: 1000 km Spa
