= Dino 206 S =

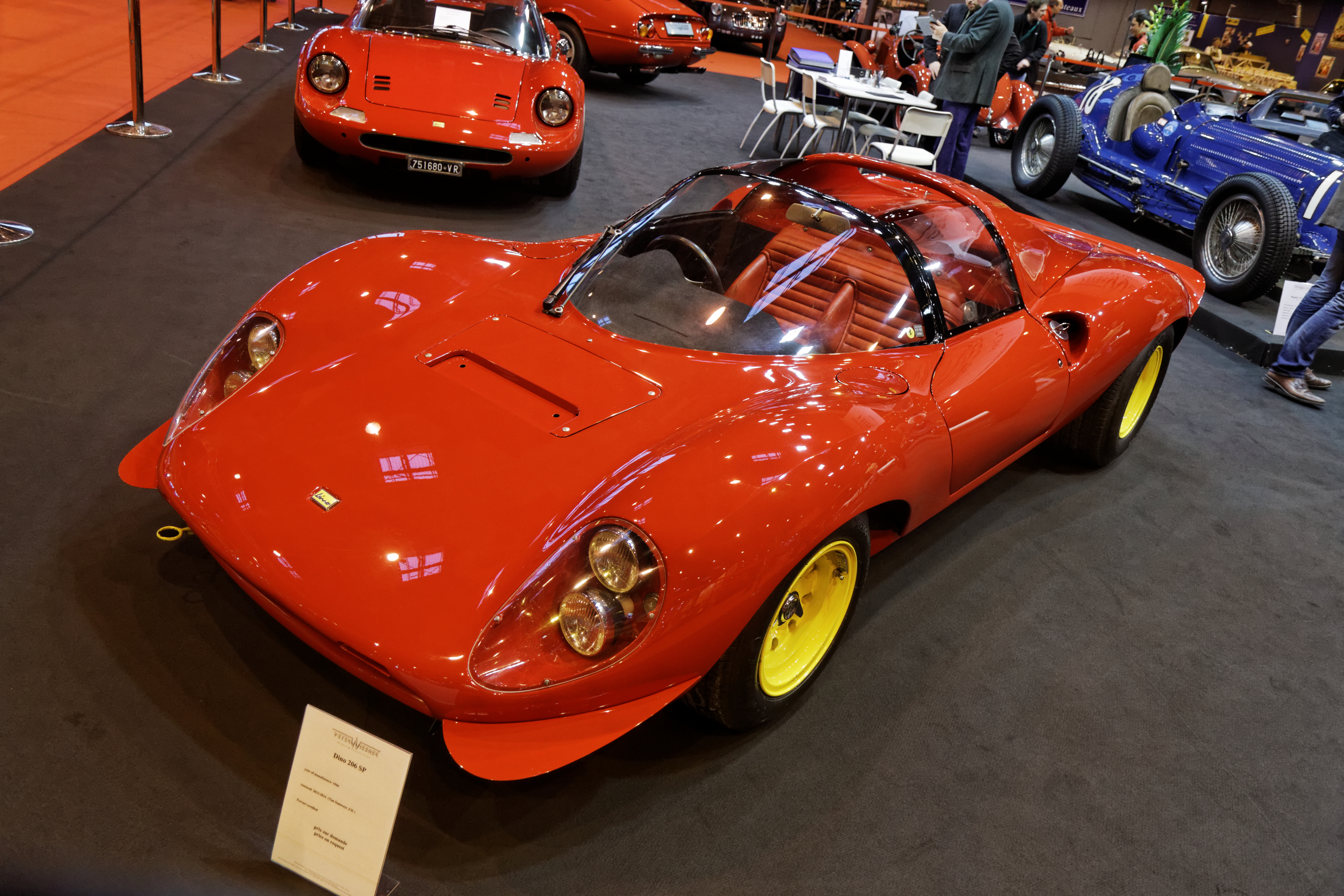
- Dino 206 S Spyder

Overview
- Manufacturer: Ferrari
- Also called: Ferrari Dino 206 S
- Production: 1966–1967; 18 made (one was converted from 166 P)
- Designer: Carrozzeria Sports Cars

Body and chassis
- Body style: Spyder; Berlinetta
- Layout: Rear mid-engine, rear-wheel-drive

Powertrain
- Engine: 2.0 L (1986.60 cc) Dino 65° V6
- Power output: 220 PS
- Transmission: 5-speed manual

Dimensions
- Wheelbase: 2,280 mm (89.8 in)
- Length: 3,875 mm (152.6 in)
- Width: 1,680 mm (66.1 in)
- Height: 985 mm (38.8 in) (Berlinetta); 972 mm (38.3 in) (Spyder)
- Curb weight: 580 kg (1,279 lb) (dry); 654 kg (1,442 lb) (curb)

Chronology
- Predecessor: Dino 206 SP

The (Ferrari) Dino 206 S is a rear mid engine sports prototype produced by Ferrari in 1966–1967 under the Dino marque with the 2 litre V6 engine named after Enzo Ferrari's late son. Ferrari intended to build and sell at least fifty examples for homologation by the CSI in the Group 4 Sportscar category, 2 litre class. While a direct competitor, the new Porsche 906, was already homologated by May 1966 during the ongoing 1966 World Sportscar Championship, only 18 Dino 206S were made until 1967, thus the S for Sportscar never was earned.

Despite being designed for sale at a relatively affordable price, and with space to carry a spare wheel and luggage and other requirements of sportscar rules, and even could be made road legal, the car had to compete in the less regulated Prototype classes instead, 2.0-litre or occasionally over 2.0-litre (then as 246S), where it soon met improved Porsche 906 and its evolution Porsche 910, as well as many other brands. In spite of this handicap the Dino 206S scored three P 2.0 class wins in the middle of the 1966 World Sportscar Championship and finished second in the Up to 2000cc classes of the International Manufacturers Championship, as did the V12 Ferrari P siblings Over 2000cc .

The 206 S was the last of the Dino sports racing cars and simultaneously the most produced.

== Development ==
The Dino 206 S had two immediate predecessors. The first was the 1965 Dino 166 P that was the first sports prototype model for the Dino marque and previewed the new rear-engined chassis and revised bodywork. The other, 206 SP, was a starting point for the final 65° DOHC race engine evolution. The Group 4 Sportscar homologation process was only completed by Ferrari in 1966 for the range of 3.3 litre V12 Ferrari 250 LM that had been produced in 1964, never for the Dino 206s, but again years later for the Ferrari 512S.

The first example of the 206 S model range, s/n 0842, was converted from the 166 P that did not participate in any races. Second example, s/n 0852, still shared the chassis number sequence with Ferrari race cars and was subsequently renumbered as s/n 002, the first in Dino race car sequence.

The 206 S was bodied by Piero Drogo's Carrozzeria Sports Cars in the same style as before, evoking bigger Ferrari prototype cars. The majority were bodied in a spyder style with a roll-bar behind the driver. Only three examples were originally created as fully closed berlinettas. A handful of cars were later rebodied as open barchettas.

One of the Dino 206 S chassis was used for the Ferrari 212 E Montagna, a uniquely-engined, one-off hillclimb-oriented sports car.

In 1967, at the Frankfurt Auto Show, Pininfarina presented a concept car based on the penultimate 206 S chassis, the Dino Berlinetta Competizione. It was designed by Paolo Martin, and was his first design for the Turin-based studio.

== Specifications ==
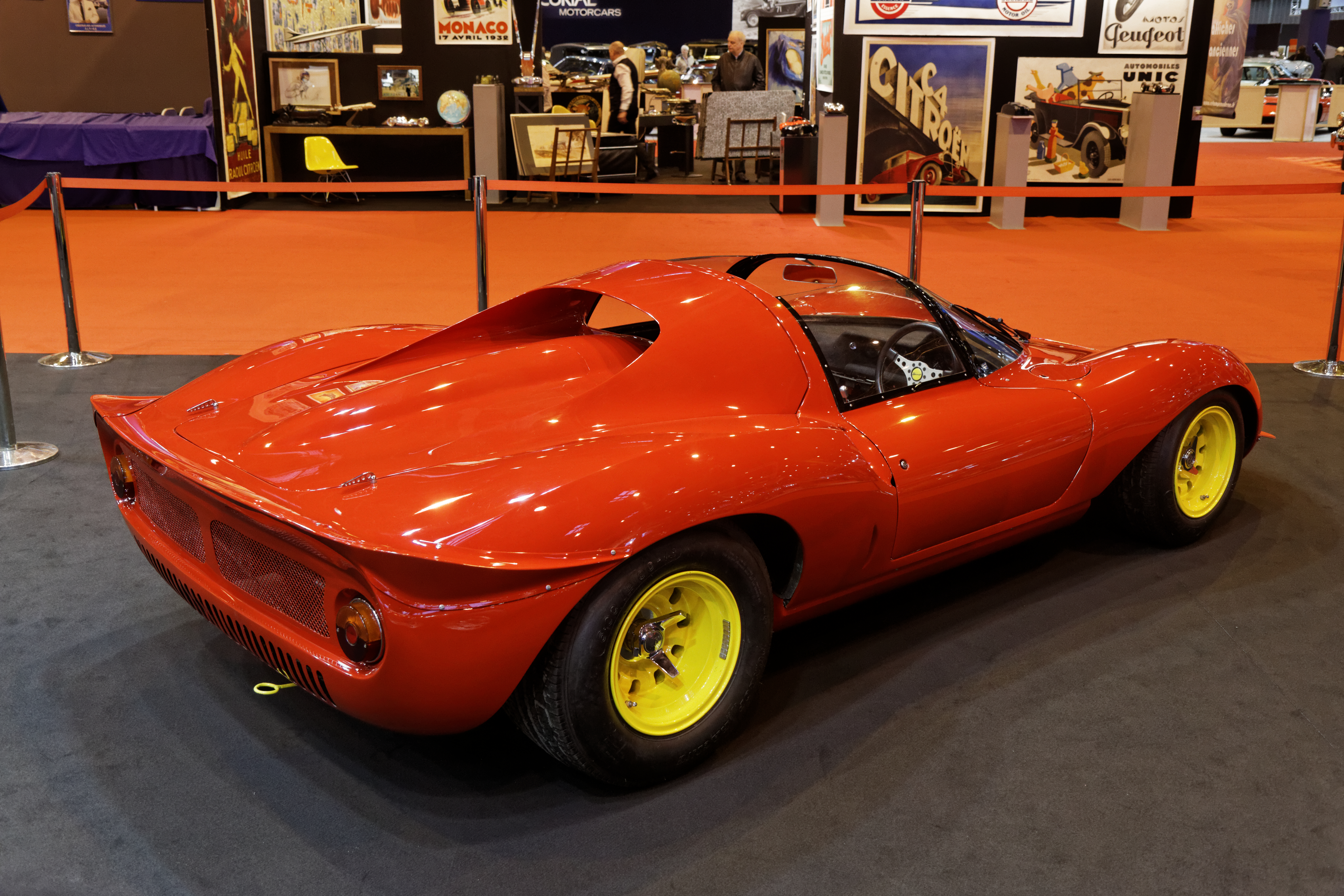
Spyder, rear view

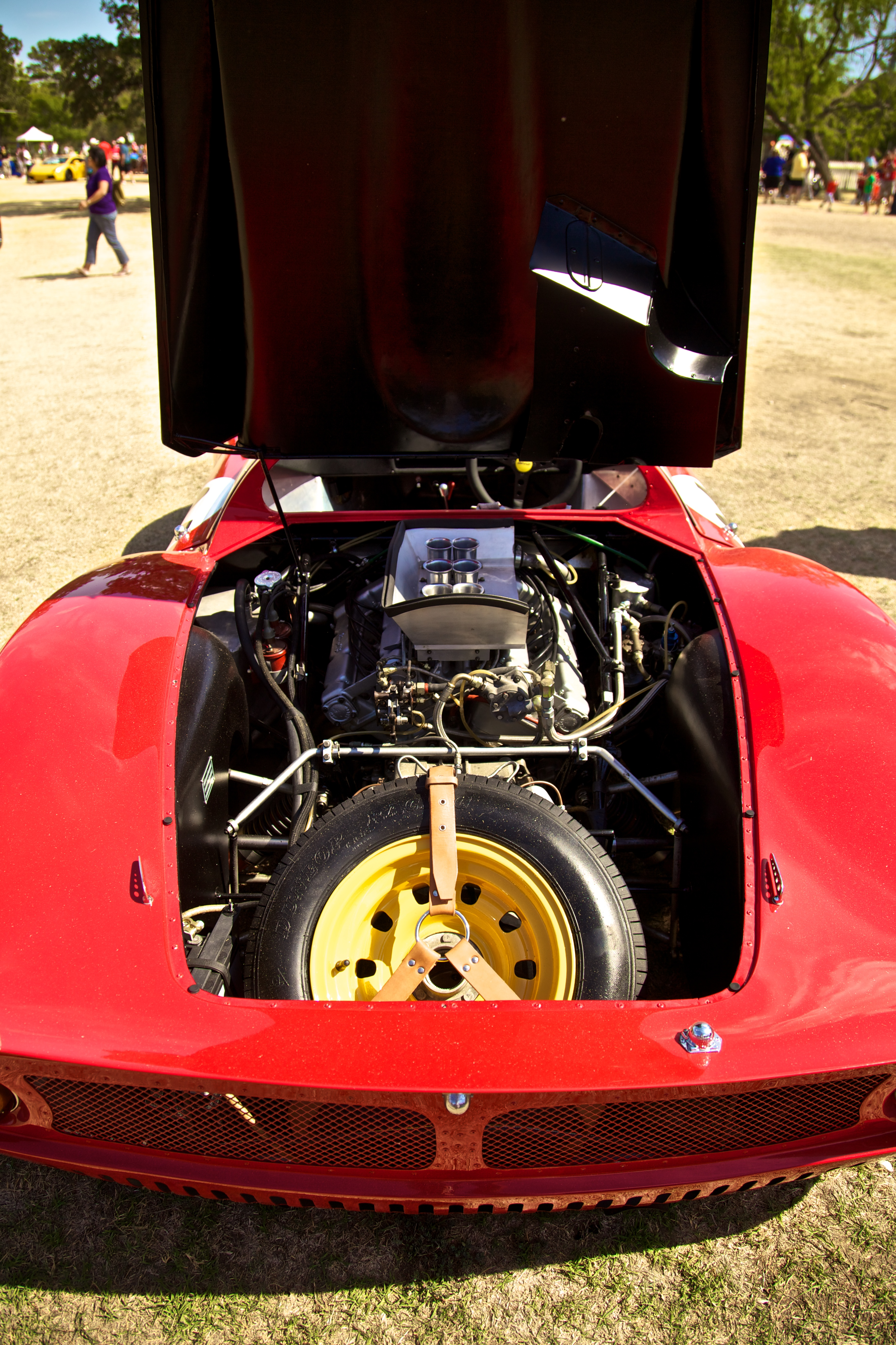
Spare wheel as required by Gr. 4

The 65° V6 engine, mounted longitudinally in the rear, displaced 2.0-litres (1,986.60 cc (121.2 cu in)) from 86 by 57 mm (3.4 by 2.2 in) of bore and stroke. The earliest version, tipo 227L, had two valves per cylinder. Later types 231 and 231B received experimental 3-valve heads. All had twin overhead camshafts per bank. This Dino engine received a newly designed combustion chamber derived directly from the Formula One experience.

The compression ratio was between 10.8 and 11:1. Most engines were equipped with three classic Weber 40DCN15 carburettors but some received the Lucas indirect fuel injection. Either one or two spark plugs per cylinder were installed. The resulting power output was 220 PS (162 kW; 217 hp) at 9000 rpm. As a race engine it also used dry sump lubrication. Top speed was 260–270 km/h.

The drive train consisted of a 5-speed, non-synchro, manual transmission and twin-plate clutch. The chassis type 585, was an evolution of the one already tried in racing and was created out of a welded tubular frame. The front and rear suspension was fully independent. The 2,280 mm (89.8 in) wheelbase was shared with both its predecessors. The car used disc brakes all-round and the fuel tank had 100-litres capacity.

== Circuit Racing ==
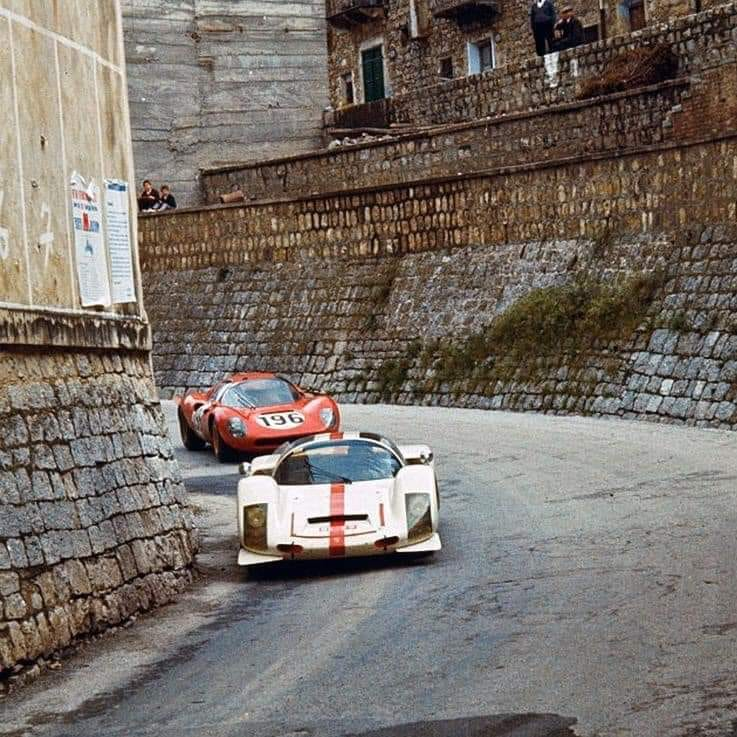
Same as the 1966 Targa Florio overall result: the Guichet/Baghetti 206S behind a private Swiss Porsche 906 Sportscar (this one finished 15th)

No 206S were entered in the 1966 Daytona 24h, thus their first 1966 World Sportscar Championship racing result was a fifth place in the 1966 12 Hours of Sebring, driven by Lorenzo Bandini and Ludovico Scarfiotti, behind three Ford GT40 and the best of several Porsche 906, thus only second in the P 2.0 class. Several Porsche 906 dominated this class also in the first Ferrari home race, the 1966 1000km Monza, that was won by a 330P4. Three 206S entered the 1966 Targa Florio the same year under Ferrari SEFAC team, while 11 Porsche 906 showed up, most of them customer sportscars as their homologation was now in effect for the S 2.0 class. After the two leading works Porsche prototypes had eliminated each other in a collision, a Swiss customer Porsche 906 Sportscar won the Targa overall, while Jean Guichet and Giancarlo Baghetti finished the race in second place overall and also with the 2 litre prototype class win. The other two 206S finished fourteenth and not at all.

The 1966 1000 km Spa netted another Ferrari V12 overall win, and for the 206S V6 of Richard Attwood/Jean Guichet sixth overall and first in the prototype 2.0 class as non of the factory Porsche 906 prototypes finished, only one of the Sportscar variant did. Another Porsche drama followed at the 1966 1000 km Nürburgring, where a 5.4-litre Chaparral won 90 seconds ahead of the better of two Dino 206S driven by Scarfiotti and Bandini who won the Prototype 2.0 class. Third was Pedro Rodríguez and Richie Ginther's factory car out of four Dino cars that were entered, with the semi-private Maranello Concessionaires DNF and the private Drummond Racing not showing up. The best 906 prototype was one lap down in fourth place, but two laps down, on places 7 to 11, were no less than four private 906 Sportscars, sandwiching the private Scuderia Filipinetti Ferrari 250LM Sportscar.

These three consecutive P 2.0 class wins in the 1966 World Sportscar Championship were the highlight of the Dino 206S road racing history. The remaining two WSC rounds with prototype classes, Le Mans and Hockenheim, were won by Porsche. For the 1966 24 Hours of Le Mans, no less the six private 206S were entered, but only three started, each DNF within 3 hours.

Some good results in non-WC races followed. Rodriguez also scored a class win at the Nassau Trophy. At the Brands Hatch GP circuit, Mike Parkes scored sixth overall and first in class. The Dino 206 S won VI Coppa Citta di Enna. Also in 1966, the Swiss Mountain Grand Prix was won by Ludovico Scarfiotti overall, but only the Sportscars classes counted towards the WSC. At the 1966 24 Hours of Le Mans, all entered 206S disappeared soon while no less than four Porsche 906 finished behind three Ford GT40 with 7 litre V8 engines, thus Ferrari was defeated in both categories.

In the 1967 World Sportscar Championship P 2.0 class, the competition entered newer cars, while Ferrari still used the pre-produced supply of 206S. Ferrari managed only one WSC finish with points in that class, at the 1967 Targa Florio, fourth behind a Podium sweep of three Porsche 910. Also, in 1967, Swedish driver Gustaf Dieden finished Swedish National Falkenberg and GP Swerige in fifth and ninth respectively. Ferdinando "Codones" Latteri and Pietro Lo Piccolo scored many overall and class wins between 1967 and 1969.

=== Hillclimbing ===
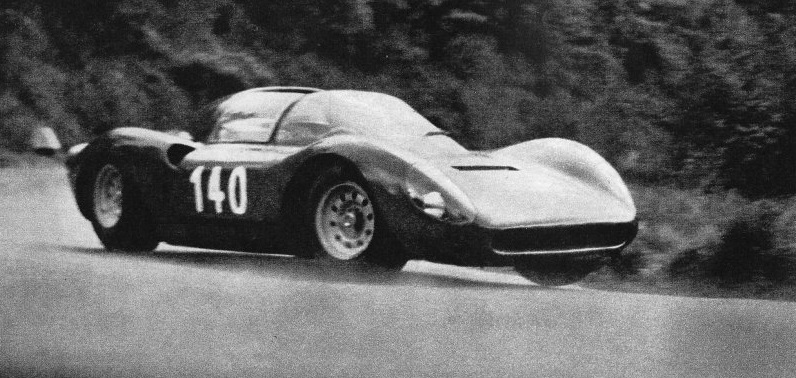
Dino 206 S in 1966 driven by Edoardo Lualdi-Gabardi, winner of Trofeo Città di Orvieto

Ludovico Scarfiotti, a 1962 and 1965 European Hill Climb champion entered, with success, many hillclimb events in the 206 S. His 1965 championship was achieved in an earlier Dino model, the 206 SP. From June 1966, he contested the series as part of a Scuderia Sant'Ambroeus entry. He drove a works prototype Dino, s/n 0842. Scarfiotti scored a second place at Rossfeld and an overall win in the Cesana-Sestriere hillclimb. The Freiburg-Schauinsland hillclimb also yielded a second position with another victory at Sierre-Montana. And so for 1966, Ludovico Scarfiotti achieved a second overall place at the European Hill Climb Championship, behind Gerhard Mitter in a dominant Porsche 910 Coupé. Next year he participated in a one more hillclimb, this time at the very challenging Trento-Bondone, finishing second overall and a second in class as well.

A Scuderia Sant'Ambroeus also fielded Edoardo Lualdi-Gabardi in the hillclimbing events. Lualdi had raced two cars throughout the 1966–1968. In 1966, his 206 S Spyder s/n 016, was used in no less than fifteen different hillclimbing races, winning six of them overall, with additional four-second places and simultaneous class wins to his name. For the 1967 and 1968 seasons he changed into yet another Spyder model, this time s/n 028, that he entered privately. Throughout those two seasons he entered thirty-four races, most of them of a hillclimbing nature. He won overall or in class at least twenty of them, with another seven second places on the podium. One of the victories was at the 1967 Trieste-Opicina hillclimb. In 1966, he placed sixth at the Trento-Bondone Hill Climb, but was unable to finish the dramatic race on the next two occasions.

== Collectability ==
The Dino 206 S race cars from the period are collectable but are not fetching as high prices as their bigger Ferrari V12 siblings. It is mostly due to a lesser engines and niche race series that they participated in. Also the Dino marque history is not all that well known to the public. The cars usually have a race history and are limited in numbers. Chassis number 006 car with an original Piero Drogo bodywork was sold in 2012 at RM Sotheby's auction for €2.5 million. The same auction house offered a s/n 028 car, as driven by Edoardo Lualdi-Gabardi in various hillclimbing events, but extensively converted at the later stage of its career. It still achieved a high bid of €2 million. More recently, in 2015, Gooding & Company auctioned the 206 S Spyder from the Peter Klutt collection, s/n 026 for US$2.3 million.

== Gallery ==
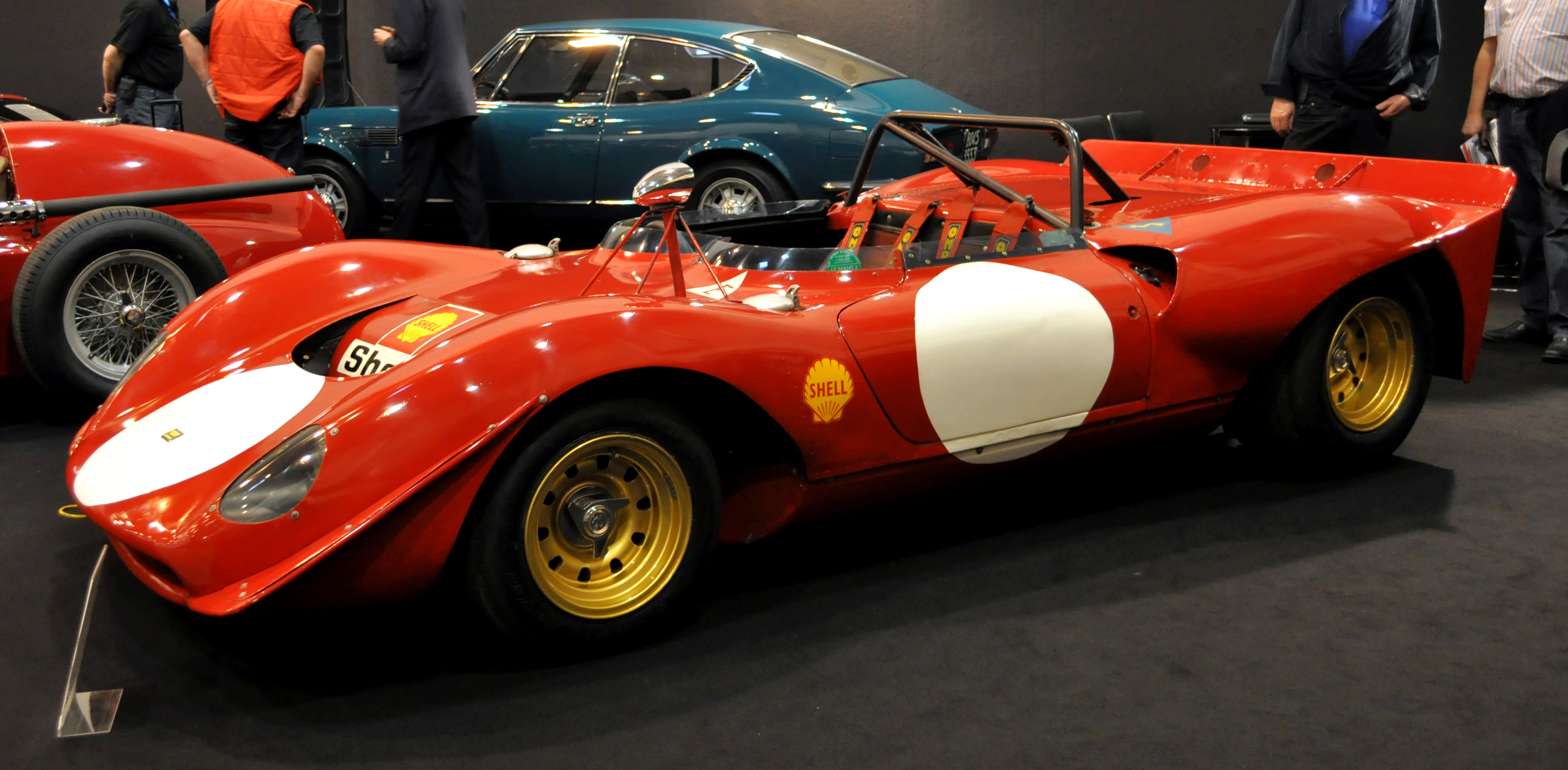
Dino 206 S modified in 1968 as a barchetta

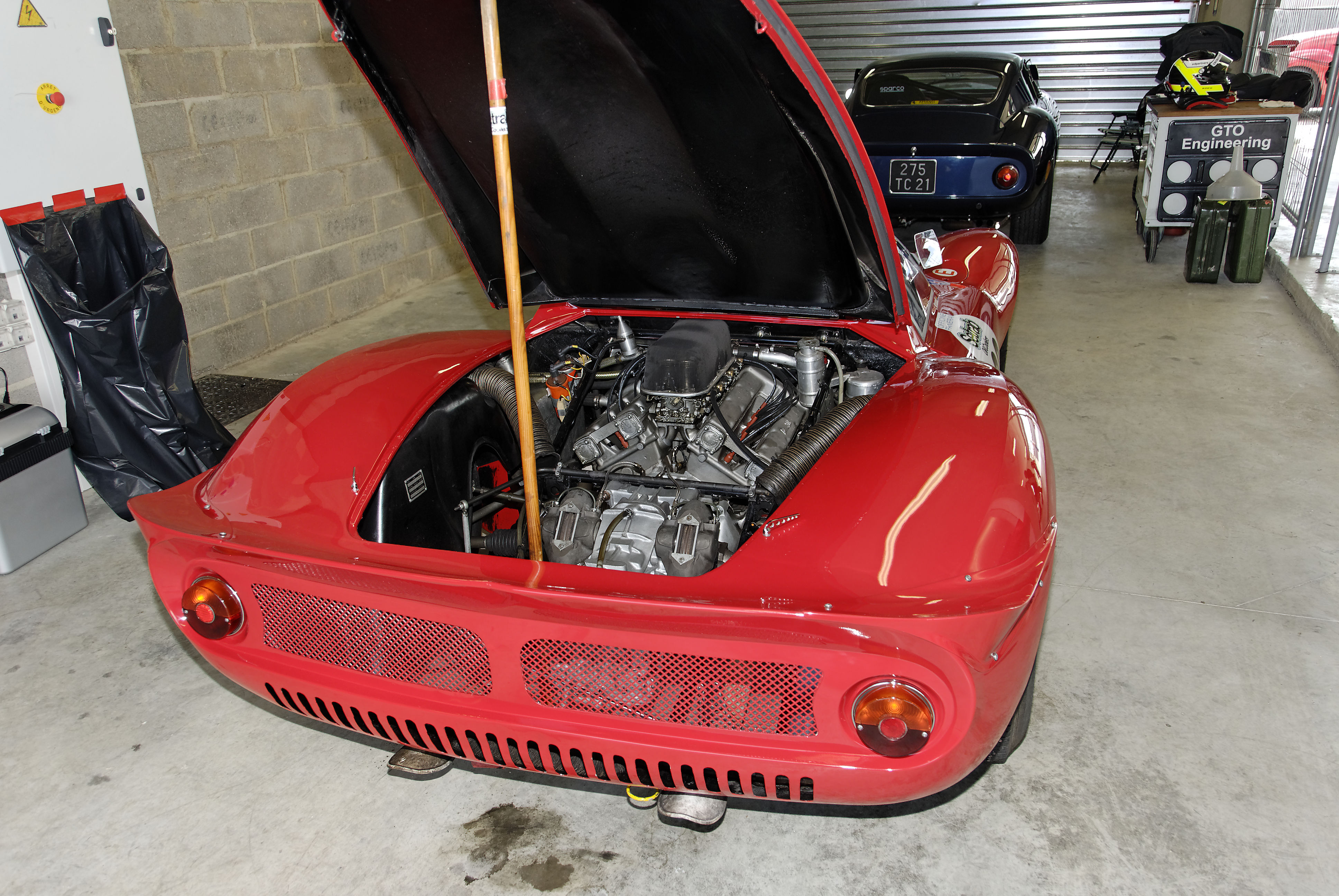
Engine bay without spare wheel, showing brake disks at the transmission

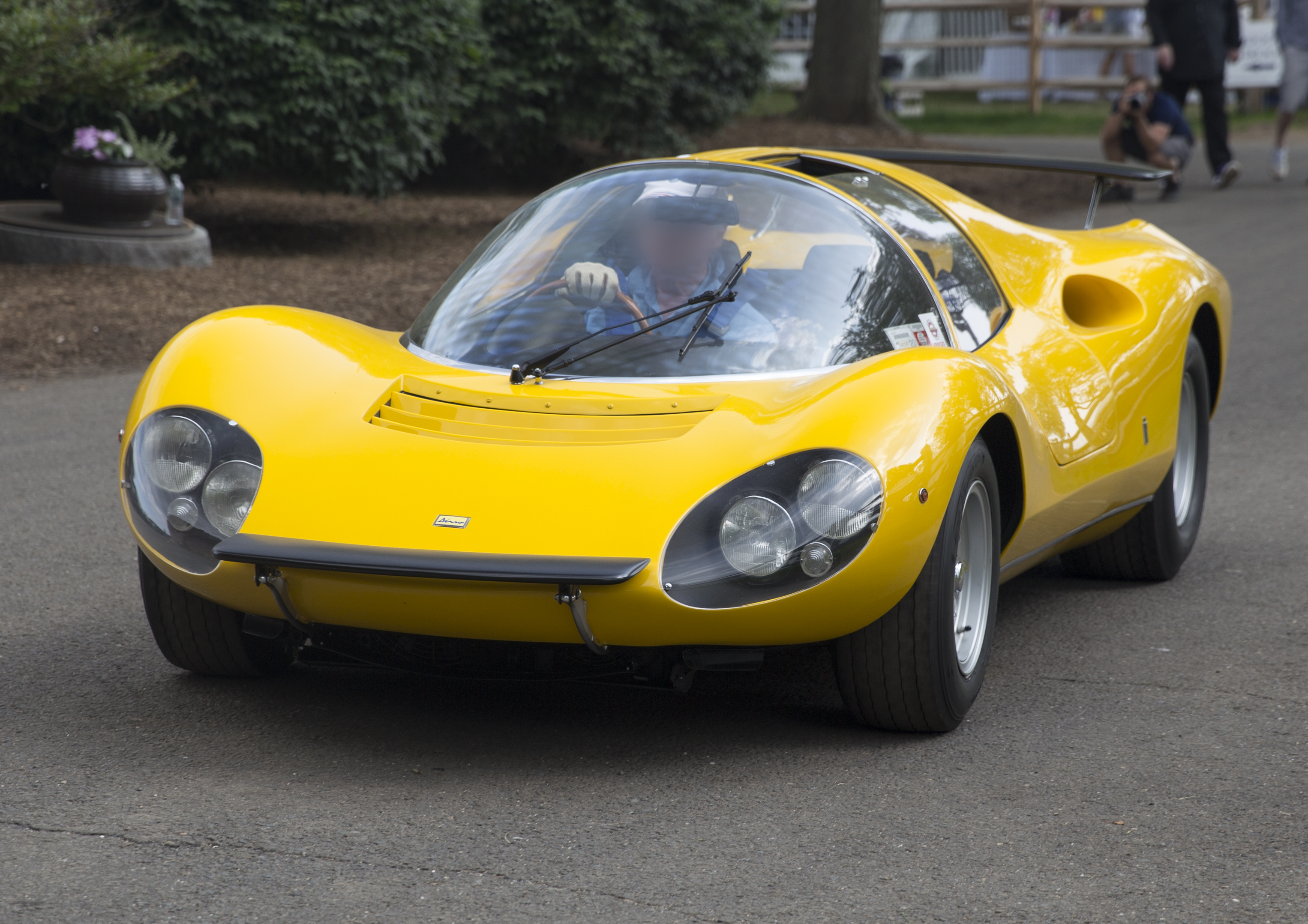
Dino Berlinetta Competizione
