= 1966 12 Hours of Sebring =

Sports car endurance race

Sebring International Raceway in 1952-1966

The 1966 12 Hours of Sebring was an endurance race held at the 5.2 mile (8.3 km) Sebring International Raceway, in Sebring, Florida, United States on March 26, 1966. It was the sixteenth running of the endurance classic and the second round of the 1966 World Sportscar Championship season. The race proved to be a disastrous event; one of the darkest in American motorsports history.

== Pre-race ==
Ford had just come off a 1-2-3 triumph at the first 24 Hours of Daytona in February, with two of their seven-liter engined GT40 Mk.II's being run by Carroll Shelby. They had effectively trounced Ferrari and Porsche, and were looking to do the same thing at Sebring in March.

Ford's assault on Sebring (which has always been a good preparation run for Le Mans) was unprecedented, considering that a mega-corporation like Ford was taking their endurance racing commitment so seriously. There were 11 GT40 Mk.I's, Mk.II's and a special X-1 Roadster (which was a heavily modified GT40 Mk.I with an aluminum chassis, a Mk.II nose, no roof and a seven-liter 427 engine, the same motor in a Mk.II) at Sebring- these cars were entered by at least five teams- all of whom had direct factory support. The two main works teams, however, were the Los Angeles-based Shelby-American, a team with direct connections to Ford and seasoned with much road-racing experience in Europe and North America; and the Charlotte-based Holman & Moody team, which was known for its successes in NASCAR. There were also two works Ferrari's (originally there were supposed to be 5) and two Chaparral 2D's. American Dan Gurney qualified his Shelby-entered Mk.II on pole position with a lap record of 2:54.6, followed by the new Ferrari 330P3 of Bob Bondurant and Mike Parkes, then a Mk.I of Britons Graham Hill and Jackie Stewart, then another Mk.II of Americans Mark Donohue and Walt Hansgen, then the X-1 of Briton Ken Miles and American Lloyd Ruby and then a Chaparral 2D of Americans Jim Hall and Hap Sharp.

== Race ==
Sportscar races in the 1960s usually had Le Mans starts (which had started the late 1920s), where the drivers who started the race stood on one side of the track, waited for the host country's starter flag to drop, ran across the track towards their cars, jumped into the cockpit and drove off. This happened at 10:30 a.m. American Eastern time, and Gurney, who started the race in the pole sitting car, did not get going. In fact, his Ford GT40 Mk.II's 7-liter engine would not start and the car sat on the pit straight motionless while all the other cars passed it. After huge amounts of time were lost, the Shelby mechanics were able to start the engine, and Gurney sped off. The works Ferrari 330P3 led the race until being passed by a GT40 Mk.I being driven by Graham Hill. Hill led the first lap, followed by the 330P3, a North American Racing Team entered 330P2, a Corvette Stingray being driven by local Dick Thompson, the Donohue/Hansgen Mk.II, 2 more Mk.I's, a Porsche and a Chaparral 2D being driven by Hap Sharp.

But Gurney's car was not out of contention. He drove very hard and passed 27 cars on the first lap alone. He continued to push hard and by the 44th lap, about 2 hours into the race- he set a new lap record of 2:54.8 at an average speed of 107.8 mph, and soon after he passed Miles in the GT40 X-1 Roadster to take the lead. Gurney and Miles, both driving Shelby entered cars, started to battle and began passing and re-passing each other for the lead. This did not sit well with Shelby, who signaled to both drivers to slow down because he felt it was way too early in the race to risk breaking the cars. This signal was promptly ignored by both drivers, so Shelby walked over to the pit wall and hammered his fist in the air at both drivers, indicating them to "knock it off." The drivers complied, and they simmered down into the 3-minute range, protecting Gurney who was in the lead.

1 hour and 20 minutes in, one of the Chaparrals driven by American Phil Hill and Swede Jo Bonnier retired with a persistent oil leak that had plagued their car all weekend. Hill admitted that the team could not find the leak in the car; it was eventually found but the car retired from the race. And eight laps later, the other Chaparral of Sharp and Hall retired with suspension problems. The cars had to take on 300 pounds of extra weight in order to comply with the rules, which hurt the car's performance and reliability.

But at 2:40 p.m., tragedy struck. A Comstock Racing entered GT40 Mk.I driven by Canadian Bob McLean was coming out of Big Bend, and while approaching the famous hairpin, the car's gearbox seized, the rear brakes locked up, and the car slid off the narrow service road used for the race. It then crashed into a ditch and started to barrel roll, and it then made very hard contact with a telephone pole. The point of contact was where one of the fuel tanks were, and the car burst into flames. McLean was trapped inside, and the few marshals at Sebring were inadequately equipped to put out the inferno, and McLean perished in the fire. He was 32 years old. When word of McLean's death reached the Comstock Racing camp, they withdrew their other GT40 Mk.I from the race.

But the race continued on, unabated as McLean's GT40 burned and burned. Safety in motor racing in those days was practically non-existent. One such example was that the Warehouse straight after the hairpin at Sebring ran right past warehouses, planes, towers and other obstructions that were completely unprotected from the race, and some people sometimes stood or even sat 2–3 feet from the track.

Come the halfway point, 4:30 p.m., the order was the Gurney/Jerry Grant GT40 Mk.II, the works 330P3 of Parkes/Bondurant, the Miles/Ruby GT40 X-1 and the Pedro Rodriguez/Mario Andretti Ferrari 365P2 entered by NART. Around Lap 172, during the transition from day to night, Bondurant showed up to the Ferrari camp on the back of a spectator's scooter. The 330P3 was parked out near the hairpin with a seized gearbox, and was effectively out. So the order was Ford 1-2 (both Shelby-run) with the NART Ferrari 3rd.

But then, disaster struck again. With less than 2 hours to go, the third placed NART 365P2 went into the pits, with Rodriguez going out and Andretti going in. Andretti took the car out, and on his first lap out, he was caught and passed (not for position) by Don Wester in a Porsche 906 going through the famous hairpin. On the Warehouse straight, Andretti re-passed Wester and pulled away from the Porsche. All of a sudden, while he was changing gears down from 4th to 3rd for the slow Webster turns at 140 mph, a part on the Ferrari's gearbox broke, and the car went from 4th to 1st, the rear wheels locked up and the Ferrari spun wildly out of control. While the hapless Andretti was spinning, Wester saw an opportunity to pass Andretti without incident. But Wester's plan failed appallingly- while underbraking for the Webster turns, the Ferrari was still going very quickly, and it then hit the back of Wester's Porsche. The Porsche spun out of control, went off the track, and it then went plowing into a group of spectators standing in an area where no one from the general public was allowed to be, and finally crashed hard into a warehouse, destroying the car. 4 spectators were killed in this tragedy- 46-year-old Willis Edenfield Sr. and his two sons, 20-year-old Willis Jr. and 9-year-old Mark were killed instantly, and 38-year-old Patricia Heacock died of her injuries hours later. Wester was knocked unconscious, but he survived with minor injuries; and this horrific incident was not known to the public until the day after.

The Ferrari went into a sand bank, and Andretti was able to get going again, but his front lights were destroyed after his contact with Wester and the sandbank, so he drove back to the pits in almost total darkness. He made it back to the pits, unaware of the horror that had taken place. The car retired after a pit fire when Andretti started the engine, destroying a number of important components, making it unable to continue.

This essentially paved the way forward for Ford to dominate yet again, with both Shelby GT40's leading 1–2. Gurney and Grant were still leading- and on the last lap, while Gurney was driving, the car's engine failed. People at the pits were expecting Gurney to take victory—but Ken Miles crossed the finish line first in the GT40 X-1. Gurney was pushing his GT40 Mk.II on the course, and he made it to the finish line. Pushing a car during the race was illegal, particularly with no lights on or with any reference of visibility, thus Gurney's GT40 car was disqualified, and the Holman/Moody entered GT40 Mk.II was awarded 2nd place. 3rd was an Essex Wire entered GT40 Mk.I of Skip Scott and Peter Revson, and then a works Porsche finished 4th.

After the race, chief race organizer Alec Ullmann and the other people involved in the organization of the race were heavily criticized for their lack of safety preparation, particularly for the McLean GT40 Mk.I accident. The facilities and the track at Sebring were also heavily criticized- the track was very narrow and people and buildings were unprotected from the cars, and the cars were unprotected from other roadside obstructions such as telephone poles, trees, and ditches. Because of the poor condition of Sebring's facilities and the difficulty in maintaining security at the track which led to the deaths of 5 people, a ten-year contract was signed to move the 12-hour event to West Palm Beach, Florida, at what later became known as Moroso Motorsports Park. An unusual series of heavy rains at West Palm Beach made it obvious that the track could not be ready in time for the 1967 race. Thus the contract was voided and the 12-hour event was again held at Sebring after efforts were made to improve safety for spectators and drivers, which included the elimination of the Webster turns and the implementation of the Warehouse chicane. This was done to move the track's Warehouse straight further away from the airport's warehouses, towers and other buildings located from where the original Warehouse straight ran through. Sebring has held the 12-hour event every year since. The circuit, located in an airport, never had any safety issues ever again.

== Official results ==
Pos	Class	No	Team	Drivers	Chassis	Engine	Laps
1	P +5.0	1	(United States) Ford Motor Company (United States) Shelby-American Inc.	(United Kingdom) Ken Miles (United States) Lloyd Ruby	Ford GT40 X-1 Roadster	Ford 7.0L V8	228
2	P +5.0	3	(United States) Ford Motor Company (United States) Holman & Moody	(United States) Mark Donohue (United States) Walt Hansgen	Ford GT40 Mk.II	Ford 7.0L V8	216
3	S 5.0	19	(United States) Essex Wire Corporation	(United States) Skip Scott (United States) Peter Revson	Ford GT40 Mk.I	Ford 4.7L V8	213
4	P 2.0	52	(Germany) Porsche System Engineering	(Germany) Hans Herrmann (United States) Joe Buzzetta (Germany) Gerhard Mitter	Porsche 906	Porsche 2.0L Flat-6	209
5	P 2.0	46	(Italy) SpA Ferrari SEFAC	(Italy) Ludovico Scarfiotti (Italy) Lorenzo Bandini	Dino 206 S	Ferrari 2.0L V6	206
6	P 2.0	49	(Switzerland) Charles Vögele	(Switzerland) Jo Siffert (Switzerland) Charles Vögele	Porsche 906	Porsche 2.0L Flat-6	206
7	S 2.0	54	Porsche Germany	(United States) George Follmer (United States) Peter Gregg	Porsche 904 GTS	Porsche 2.0L Flat-6	205
8	P 2.0	50	(United States) Ed Hugus	(United States) Lake Underwood (United States) Ed Hugus	Porsche 906	Porsche 2.0L Flat-6	204
9	GT +5.0	9	(United States) Roger Penske	(United States) George Wintersteen (United States) Ben Moore	Chevrolet Corvette StingRay	Chevrolet 7.0L V8	201
10	S +5.0	6	(United States) Scuderia Bear	(United States) Bob Grossman (United States) Ed Lowther	Shelby Cobra	Ford 7.0L V8	197
11	GT +5.0	8	(United States) Harold C. Whims	(United States) Don Yenko (United States) Dave Morgan (United States) Harold Whims	Chevrolet Corvette StingRay	Chevrolet 7.0L V8	197
12	P +5.0	4	(United States) Ford Motor Company (United States) Holman & Moody	(United States) A. J. Foyt (United States) Ronnie Bucknum	Ford GT40 Mk.II	Ford 7.0L V8	192
13	S 5.0	23	(United States) Scuderia Bear	(United States) Bruce Jennings (United States) Richard Holquist	Ford GT40 Mk.I	Ford 4.7L V8	189
14	S 1.6	63	(Italy) Autodelta SpA	(Italy) Giacomo Russo (Switzerland) Gaston Andrey	Alfa Romeo Giulia TZ2	Alfa Romeo 1.6L I4	189
15	S 5.0	80	(United States) Tom Payne	(United States) Bob Said (United States) Ray Cuomo (United States) John Addison	Shelby Cobra	Ford 5.0L V8	191
16	S 2.0	56	(Canada) Jacques Duval	(Canada) Jacques Duval (Canada) Horst Kroll	Porsche 904 GTS	Porsche 2.0L Flat-6	188
17	GT; 2.0	59	(United Kingdom) British Motor Co.	(United Kingdom) Roger Mac (Australia) Peter Manton	MG B	BMC 1.8L I4	178
18	P 2.0	67	(United Kingdom) Donald Healey Motor Co.	(Australia) Paul Hawkins (Finland) Timo Mäkinen	Austin-Healey Sprite	BMC 1.3L I4	175
19	GT; 2.5	41	(United Kingdom) Standard Triumph Motor Co.	(United States) Steve Froines (United States) Bill Pendleton	Triumph TR4A	Triumph 2.2L I4	172
20	GT; 2.5	51	(United States) RBM Motors	(United States) Jack Ryan (United States) E. Linley Coleman	Porsche 911	Porsche 2.2L Flat-6	168
21	S 1.3	65	(United States) Fred J. Baker	(United States) Fred Baker (United States) Bill Kurtley	Alpine M65	Renault 1.3L I4	168
22	S +5.0	7	(United States) Space Science Service	(United States) John Bentley (United States) Arthur M. Latta (United States) Herb Byrne	Shelby Cobra	Ford 7.0L V8	166
23	GT; 2.5	40	(United Kingdom) Standard Triumph Motor Co.	(United States) Dick Gilmartin (United States) Mike Rothschild	Triumph TR4A	Triumph 2.2L I4	162
24	S 1.3	69	(United States) Capt. Kenneth Sellers	(United States) Kenneth Sellers (United States) Robert Shaw	Alpine M65	Renault 1.1L I4	162
NC	S 2.0	58	(United States) Carl Haas Automobiles	(United States) William McKemie (United States) Fred Opert	Elva Courier Mk IV	Ford 1.8L I4	153
NC	GT; 2.5	42	(United Kingdom) Standard Triumph Motor Co.	(Canada) Ludwig Heimrath (Canada) R. Craig Hill	Triumph TR4A	Triumph 2.2L I4	151
NC	GT; 2.5	92	(United States) John Kingham	(United States) Milo Vega (United States) Bob Kingham (United States) Herb Byrne	Triumph TR4A	Triumph 2.2L I4	131
NC	P 2.0	66	(United Kingdom) Donald Healey Motor Co.	(Finland) Rauno Aaltonen (United Kingdom) Clive Baker	Austin-Healey Sprite	BMC 1.3L I4	121
NC	GT; 5.0	32	(United States) Richard B. Robson	(United States) Rajah Rodgers (United States) Bill Buchman (United States) Richard Robson	Jaguar XK-E	Jaguar 3.8L I6	82
DSQ	P +5.0	2	(United States) Ford Motor Company (United States) Shelby-American Inc.	(United States) Dan Gurney (United States) Jerry Grant	Ford GT40 Mk.II	Ford 7.0L V8	227
DNF	P 5.0	26	(United States) North American Racing Team (NART)	(Mexico) Pedro Rodriguez (United States) Mario Andretti	Ferrari 365 P2	Ferrari 4.4L V12	188
DNF	P 2.0	48	(United States) Otto Zipper	(United States) Don Wester (United States) Scooter Patrick	Porsche 906	Porsche 2.0L Flat-6	182
DNF	P 5.0	27	(Italy) SpA Ferrari SEFAC	(United Kingdom) Mike Parkes (United States) Bob Bondurant	Ferrari 330 P3	Ferrari 4.0L V12	172
DNF	GT; 2.0	44	(United Kingdom) British Motor Co.	(United Kingdom) Paddy Hopkirk (United Kingdom) Andrew Hedges	MG B	BMC 1.8L I4	178
DNF	S 2.0	47	(United States) Briggs Cunningham	(United States) Briggs Cunningham (United States) Dave Jordan (United States) John Fitch	Porsche 904 GTS	Porsche 2.0L Flat-6	148
DNF	S 1.3	68	(United States) Howard Hanna	(United States) Howard Hanna (United States) Morrow Decker	Matra Djet MB8S	Renault 1.1L I4	148
DNF	S 5.0	25	(United States) Ford Motor Company (United Kingdom) Alan Mann Racing	(United Kingdom) John Whitmore (Australia) Frank Gardner	Ford GT40 Mk.I	Ford 4.7L V8	142
DNF	S 5.0	24	(United States) Ford Motor Company (United Kingdom) Alan Mann Racing	(United Kingdom) Graham Hill (United Kingdom) Jackie Stewart	Ford GT40 Mk.I	Ford 4.7L V8	142
DNF	GT; 2.0	85	(United Kingdom) Continental Cars, Ltd.	(United States) Albert Ackerly (United States) Arch McNeill	MG B	BMC 1.8L I4	137
DNF	P 2.0	53	(Germany) Porsche System Engineering	(Germany) Gerhard Mitter (Germany) Günther Klass	Porsche 906	Porsche 1.9L Flat-6	120
DNF	S 2.0	55	(Germany) Porsche System Engineering	(Germany) Udo Schütz (Germany) Dieter Glemser	Porsche 904 GTS	Porsche 2.0L Flat-4	114
DSQ	S 5.0	22	(United States) Bill Wonder	(United States) William Wonder (United States) Bobby Brown	Ford GT40 Mk.I	Ford 4.7L V8	100
DNF	S 5.0	17	(Canada) Comstock Racing Team	(Canada) Eppie Wietzes (Canada) Craig Fisher	Ford GT40 Mk.I	Ford 4.7L V8	96
DNF	S 2.0	57	(United States) Wetanson & Ripley	(United States) Millard Ripley (United States) Herb Wetanson	Porsche 904 GTS	Porsche 2.0L Flat-4	94
DNF	P 2.0	87	(United States) Keymo Motors Corporation	(United States) Charlie Kolb (United States) John Fulp	Porsche 904/8 Bergspyder	Porsche 1.9L Flat-8	87
DNF	S 5.0	18	(Canada) Comstock Racing Team	(Canada) Bob McLean (Canada) Jean Ouellet	Ford GT40 Mk.I	Ford 4.7L V8	83
DNF	GT; 5.0	82	(United States) Terry Kohler	(United States) Terry Kohler (United States) Michael Reina (United States) Walt Biddle	Shelby GT350	Ford 4.7L V8	71
DNF	S 5.0	33	(United States) Arthur Swanson	(United States) Arthur W. Swanson (United States) /Robert Ennis	Ferrari 250 LM	Ferrari 3.3L V12	70
DNF	P +5.0	10	(United States) Roger Penske	(United States) Dick Thompson (United States) Dick Guldstrand	Chevrolet Corvette GrandSport	Chevrolet 7.0L V8	65
DNF	S 1.6	62	(Italy) Autodelta SpA	(Belgium) Lucien Bianchi (France) Bernard Consten	Alfa Romeo Giulia TZ2	Alfa Romeo 1.6L I4	61
DNF	P 2.0	67	(United States) Jack Slottag	(United States) Jack Slottag (United States) Larry B. Perkins	Ferrari 250 GTO	Ferrari 3.0L V12	61
DNF	P 3.0	39	(United Kingdom) Standard Triumph Motor Co.	(United States) Bob Tullius (United States) Charles Gates	Triumph TR4A	Triumph 2.2L I4	47
DNF	S 5.0	21	(United Kingdom) Peter Sutcliffe	(United Kingdom) Innes Ireland (United Kingdom) Peter Sutcliffe	Ford GT40 Mk.I	Ford 4.7L V8	47
DNF	P +5.0	11	(United States) Chaparral Cars Inc.	(United States) Hap Sharp (United States) Jim Hall	Chaparral 2D	Chevrolet 7.0L V8	35
DSQ	P 3.0	43	(United States) Fergus Import Motors	(United States) Ben Hall (United States) Al Costner	Morgan Plus 4 SS	Triumph 2.1L I4	35
DNF	S 5.0	20	(United States) Essex Wire Corporation	(United States) Masten Gregory (United States) Augie Pabst	Ford GT40 Mk.I	Ford 4.7L V8	30
DNF	P +5.0	12	(United States) Chaparral Cars Inc.	(Sweden) Jo Bonnier (United States) Phil Hill	Chaparral 2D	Chevrolet 7.0L V8	27
DNF	GT; 1.6	60	(United States) Autolab Imports	(United States) Robert Colombosian (United States) John Todd	Lotus Elan	Ford 1.6L I4	25
DNF	S 5.0	36	(United States) Ross MacGrotty Chevrolet	(United States) Ross MacGrotty (United States) Ed Myers (United States) Art Riley	Yenko Stinger	Chevrolet 2.7L Flat-6	25
DNF	S 1.6	61	(Italy) Autodelta SpA	(Italy) Teodoro Zeccoli (Italy) Giacomo Russo	Alfa Romeo Giulia TZ2	Alfa Romeo 1.6L I4	22
DNF	S 1.6	64	(Italy) Filippo Theodoli	(United States) Sam Posey (United States) Harry Theodoracopulos	Alfa Romeo Giulia TZ2	Alfa Romeo 1.6L I4	16
DNF	S 1.3	89	(United States) Lewis M. Smith Jr.	(United States) Edgar H. Schwantz (United States) Sherman S. Smith	Abarth-Simca 1300 Balbero	Abarth 1.3L I4	13
DNF	GT; 2.0	84	(United States) Roger West	(United States) Roger West (United States) Tommy Charles	MG B	BMC 1.8L I4	7
DNF	GT; 2.0	60	(United States) McMillan Ring Free Oil Co.	(United States) Donna Mae Mims (United States) John Luke	Yenko Stinger	Chevrolet 2.7L Flat-6	1

== Statistics ==
- Pole position: #2 Shelby-American Inc. Ford GT40 Mk.II (Dan Gurney)- 2:54.6 (qualifying record)
- Fastest lap: #2 Shelby-American Inc. Ford GT40 Mk.II (Dan Gurney)- 2:54.8 (lap record)
- Distance: 1185.600 miles/1908.035 km
- Average Speed: 98.629 mph / 158.728 km/h
- Weather conditions: Sunny

World Sportscar Championship
Previous race: 24 Hours of Daytona	1966 season	Next race: 1000km of Monza
