= Jean Guichet =

French racing driver (born 1927)

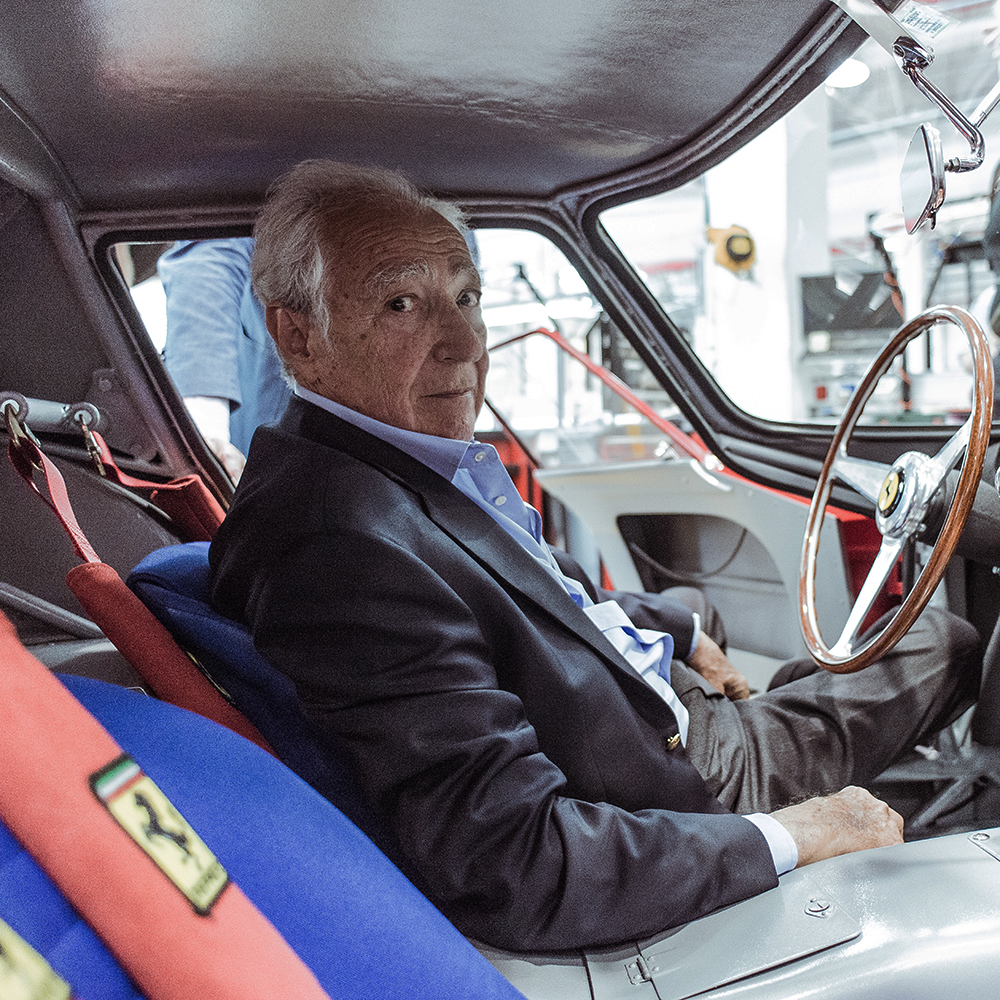
- Jean Guichet in the Ferrari 250 GTO Chassis 4675 GT that he drove in 1964.
- Nationality: (France) French
- Born: Jean Louis Marius Guichet; 10 August 1927 (age 99) Marseille, France

24 Hours of Le Mans career
- Years: 1956 – 1957, 1960 – 1969, 1975
- Teams: Gordini; Abarth; P. Noblet; Ferrari; Scuderia Filipinetti; Alpine; Matra; H. Poulain
- Best finish: 1st (1964)
- Class wins: 3 (1961, 1962, 1964)

Jean Louis Marius Guichet (born 10 August 1927 in Marseille, France) is a French industrialist and former racing driver. He is best known for winning the 1964 24 Hours of Le Mans with co-driver Nino Vaccarella, driving a Ferrari 275 P for Scuderia Ferrari.

== Racing career ==
Guichet raced sports cars and rallied from 1948 through the late 1970s. He began his racing career as a self-funded independent driver. Following an appearance with Abarth at the 1960 24 Hours of Le Mans, he then competed at Le Mans for three years in a private Ferrari entry, a team he had been connect to since a hillclimb in 1956, and took overall podiums in both 1961 and 1962. He then became a factory driver for Scuderia Ferrari in 1964 and competed with the team for three years, including for his overall win with Vaccarella in 1964, followed by an entry in 1967 for the Scuderia Filipinetti customer team. During this time, he also joined Ferrari customer team NART for the 1967 24 Hours of Daytona, where he finished third.

Guichet is also known as the first owner of 1963 Ferrari 250 GTO chassis number 5111GT, one of only 36 produced. He successfully raced this car, including an overall win of the 1963 Tour de France with co-driver José Behra. Following Guichet's sale of the car in 1965 and multiple subsequent ownership changes, this car was sold privately in September 2013 for $52,000,000 USD. This broke the then-current record for world's most expensive car.

== Racing record ==
=== Complete 24 Hours of Le Mans results ===
Year	Team	Co-Drivers	Car	Class	Laps	Pos.	Class Pos.
1956	(France) Automobiles Gordini	(France) Robert Manzon	Gordini T15S	S3.0	80	DNF (Engine)	
1957	(France) Automobiles Gordini	(France) André Guelfi	Gordini T24S	S3.0	38	DNF (Engine)	
1960	(Italy) Abarth & Cie	(France) Paul Condrillier	Abarth 850S	S850	174	DNF (Clutch)	
1961	(Belgium) P. Noblet (private entrant)	(Belgium) Pierre Noblet	Ferrari 250 GT SWB	GT3.0	317	3rd	1st
1962	(Belgium) P. Noblet (private entrant)	(Belgium) Pierre Noblet	Ferrari 250 GTO	GT3.0	326	2nd	1st
1963	(Belgium) P. Noblet (private entrant)	(Belgium) Pierre Noblet	Ferrari 330 LMB	P+3.0	79	DNF (Oil pipe)	
1964	(Italy) SpA Ferrari SEFAC	(Italy) Nino Vaccarella	Ferrari 275 P	P5.0	349	1st	1st
1965	(Italy) SpA Ferrari SEFAC	(United Kingdom) Mike Parkes	Ferrari 330 P2 Spyder	P4.0	315	DNF (Gearbox)	
1966	(Italy) SpA Ferrari SEFAC	(Italy) Lorenzo Bandini	Ferrari 330 P3	P5.0	226	DNF (Engine)	
1967	(Switzerland) Scuderia Filipinetti	(Switzerland) Herbert Müller	Ferrari 412 P	P5.0	88	DNF (Piston)	
1968	(France) Société Automobiles; Alpine	(France) Jean-Pierre Jabouille	Alpine A220	P3.0	185	DNF (Electrics)	
1969	(France) Equipe Matra - Elf	(Italy) Nino Vaccarella	Matra-Simca MS630	P3.0	359	5th	3rd
1975	(France) H. Poulain (private entrant)	(France) Hervé Poulain (United States) Sam Posey	BMW 3.0 CSL	TS	73	DNF (Transmission)	

=== Complete 12 Hours of Sebring results ===
Year	Team	Co-Drivers	Car	Class	Laps	Pos.	Class Pos.
1962	(Italy) Abarth Corse	(Italy) Alfonso Thiele	Abarth 850S	S1.15	180	10th	1st
1964	(Italy) S.E.F.A.C. Ferrari	(Italy) Carlo Maria Abate	Ferrari 250 GTO/64	GT3.0	113	DSQ (Assistance)	
1967	(Italy) Scuderia Ambroeus	(Mexico) Pedro Rodríguez	Ferrari Dino 206 S	P2.0	101	DNF (Overheating)	

=== Complete 24 Hours of Daytona results ===
Year	Team	Co-Drivers	Car	Class	Laps	Pos.	Class Pos.
1964	(United States) Shelby American, Inc.	(France) Jo Schlesser	Shelby Cobra	GT+2.0	109	DNF (Piston)	
1967	(United States) North American Racing Team	(Mexico) Pedro Rodríguez	Ferrari 412 P	P+2.0	637	3rd	3rd

=== Complete IMC results ===
Year	Entrant	Car	1	2	3	4	5	6	7	8	9
1971	Jean Guichet	Peugeot 504	MON	SWE	ITA	KEN	MAR; Ret	AUT	GRE	GBR	
1972	Jean Guichet	Peugeot 504	MON	SWE	KEN	MAR; Ret	GRE	AUT	ITA	USA	GBR

=== Complete WRC results ===
Year	Entrant	Car	1	2	3	4	5	6	7	8	9	10	11	12	13	WDC	Pts
1973	Jean Guichet	Peugeot 504	MON	SWE	POR	KEN	MOR; Ret	GRE	POL	FIN	AUT	ITA	USA	GBR	FRA	N/A	N/A
1976	Jean Guichet	Peugeot 504	MON	SWE	POR	KEN	GRC	MOR; 9	FIN	ITA	FRA	GBR				N/A	N/A
1977	Marshalls (EA) Ltd.	Peugeot 504	MON	SWE	POR	KEN; Ret	NZL	GRC	FIN	CAN	ITA	FRA	GBR			N/A	N/A

Sporting positions
Preceded by Ludovico Scarfiotti; Lorenzo Bandini	Winner of the 24 Hours of Le Mans; 1964 with: Nino Vaccarella	Succeeded by Jochen Rindt; Masten Gregory
