= Porsche 906 =

Street-legal racing car from Porsche

Porsche 906 Carrera 6
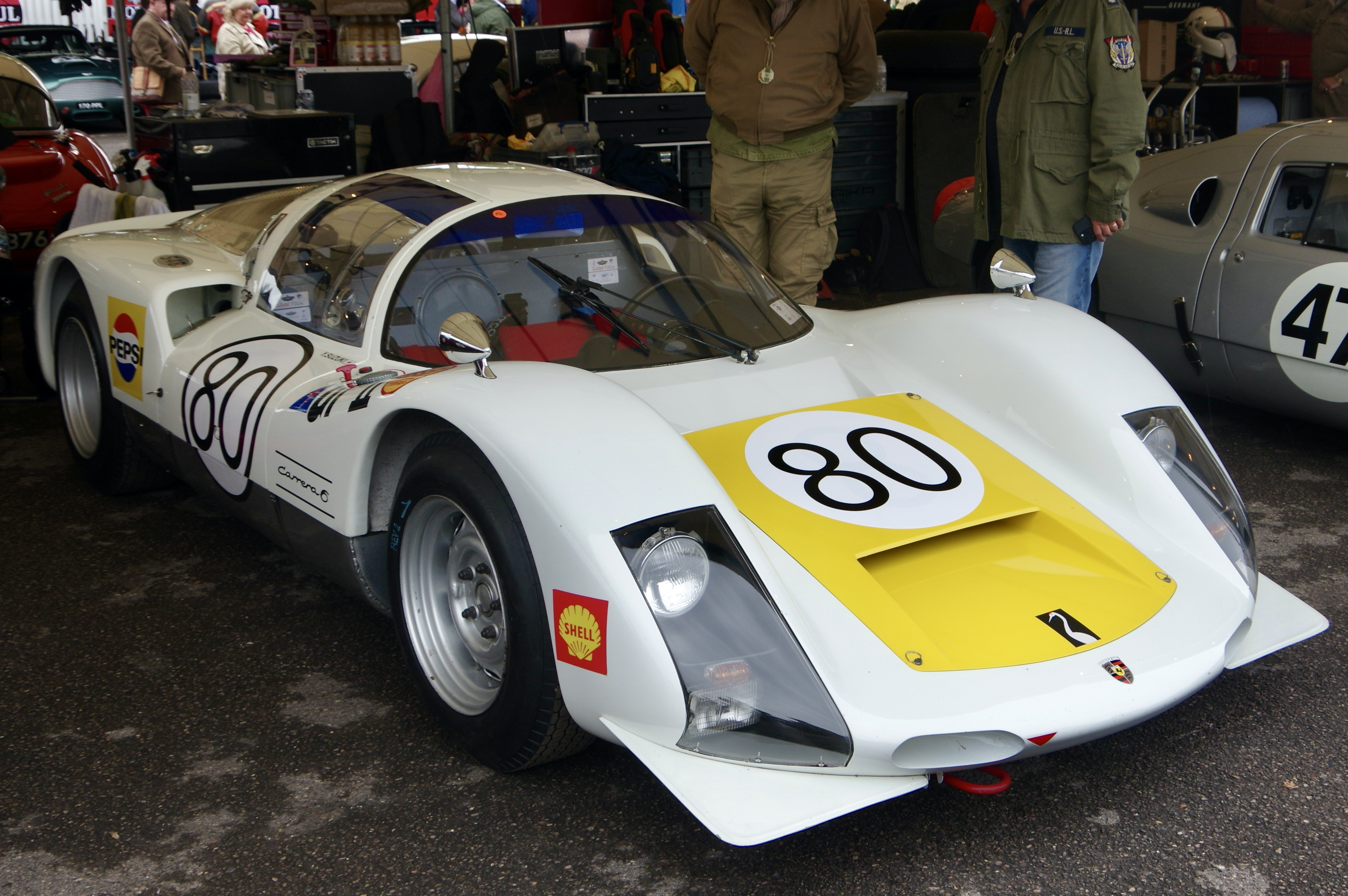

Overview
- Manufacturer: Porsche
- Production: 1966
- Designer: Ferdinand Piëch, Erwin Komenda

Body and chassis
- Class: Group 4 Group 6
- Layout: RMR layout
- Doors: Gull-wing

Powertrain
- Engine: 2.0L (1991cc) flat 6

Dimensions
- Curb weight: 580 kg (1,280 lb)

Chronology
- Predecessor: Porsche 904
- Successor: Porsche 910

The Porsche 906, sold as Carrera 6, with a 2-litre flat six-cylinder Type 901 engine compared to the F4 in its predecessor Porsche 904 Carrera GTS, is a Group 4 Sports Car from Porsche announced in January 1966 for the 1966 World Sportscar Championship. The street-legal racing car met homologation requirements of the FIA like space for luggage and carrying a spare wheel (as did the Porsche 917 in 1969). When the required minimum number of at the time 50 cars was produced, of 65 in total, homologation came into effect in May 1966.

In earlier races, the already numerous 906 had to be entered in the Group 6 Sports Prototype class. Later, the factory also entered modified 906 as prototypes, especially as lightweight hillclimbing spyder, with current Formula 1 suspension parts and wheels, eight cylinder engine, or long tail for Le Mans. Already by August 1966, new prototype class chassis were called Porsche 910.

Together with results of the 904, the 910 and even the 911, the 906 won all 2 litre classes of the 1966 World Sportscar Championship and the 1966 European Hill Climb Championship. Competition from the comparable Ferrari Dino 206S, also intended as Gr.4 sportscar as indicated by the S, materialized only in the Gr. 6 prototype classes as Ferrari built only 18. Privateers in 906 helped Porsche win also the 1967 World Sportscar Championship 2 litre sportscar class which was discontinued in 1968.

== History ==
Prior to the Porsche 906 was the 904 which achieved many racing victories. At the age of 28, Ferdinand Piëch, the grandson of Ferdinand Porsche was given the important job of being in charge of the development of the new Porsche racing cars. His goal for recreating the 904 to the new 906 was to make it as lightweight as can be. This would mean stripping all of the heavy steel from the body and using unstressed fiberglass instead. Constructing the new car with the fiberglass helped with things such as structural support as well as looks because it was all placed by hand instead of having an uneven paint job done to it.

The finished product weighed around 580 kg (1,280 lbs), which was around 250 lbs lighter than the 904. This was not only due to the body, but also the engine was much lighter. Normally the car would be fitted with a 901/20 6-cylinder with carburetors that was making 210 horsepower at 8,000 rpm. On occasion though there would be times when it was replaced with a 8-cylinder when the car was being used by the factory racing team. This would help in events such as hillclimbing, when the altitude would increase, against the Ferrari Dino in the European championship.

=== Racing history ===
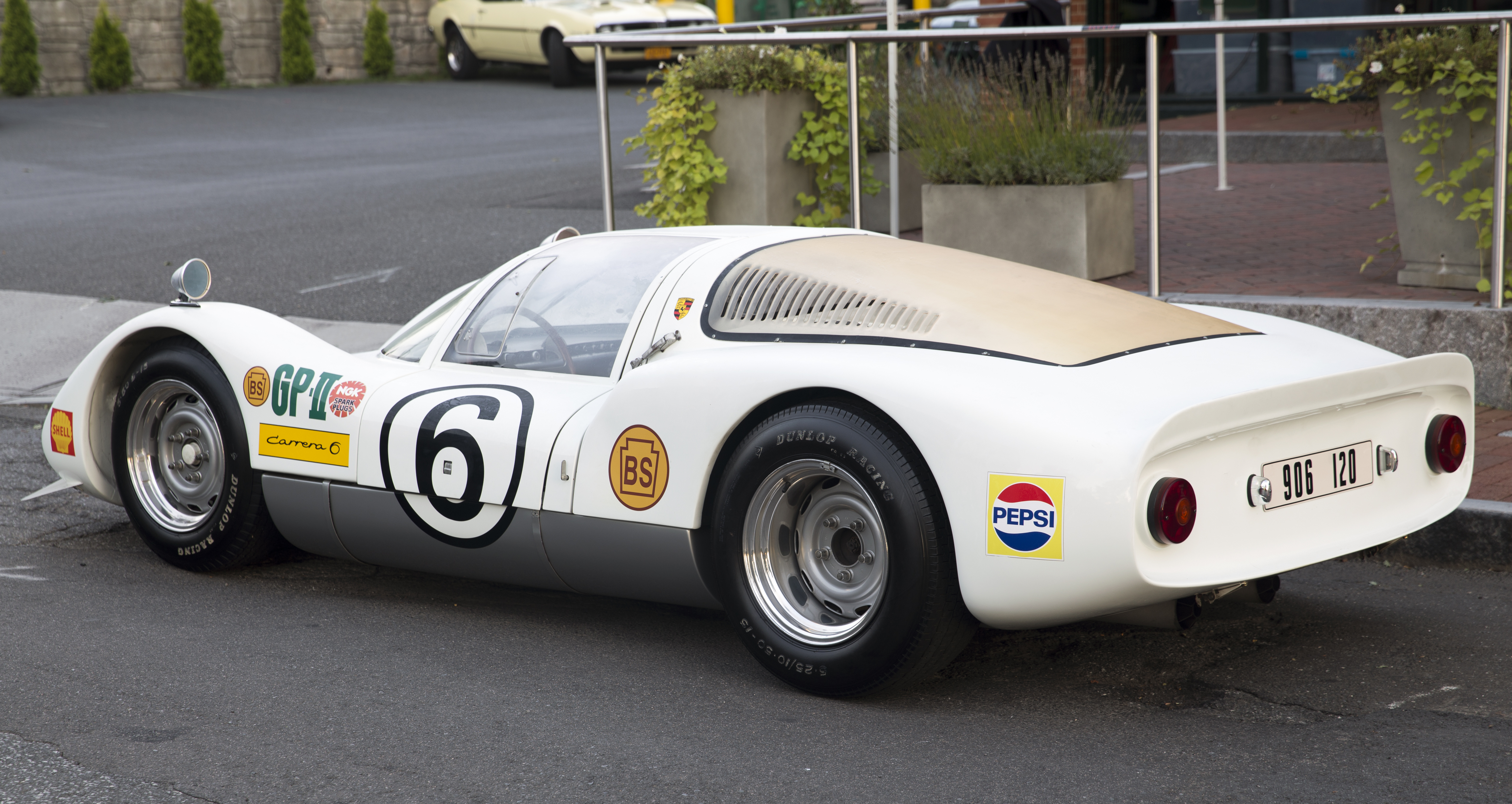
Porsche 906 (906-120), rear view

The 906 had several racing careers, with the one as Group 4 sportscar up to 2000cc raced by dozens of customers being the one it was designed for, the most prolific (one overall World Sportscar Championship race win, at the 1966 Targa Florio) and the longest.

The 906 helped Porsche win the 1966 World Sportscar Championship in both 2-litre-classes with a perfect score of 42 points, the International Manufacturers Championship for prototypes over Ferrari, and the International Sports Car Championship Division II (1301 to 2000cc) over Alfa Romeo and Lotus, as the Ferrari Dino 206S never was homologated and always had to run as prototype.

In addition, a 906 Bergspyder prototype was raced by the factory already in late 1965 and early 1966 European Hill Climb Championship heats, while the Sportscar version won its class in 1967 and 1968.

=== 906 as Gr.6 Prototype ===
The first use case for the 906 was running as prototype, inevitable before the Sportscars homologation was achieved by May 1966, and then later on to test or use improvements that were outside of homologation, like fuel injection, engine size and type, long tail body, new Formula-1-like wheels etc. By summer of 1966, new 906-like chassis built by the factory were called Porsche 910.

A few 906 also ran as prototype over 2000cc when a 2200cc engine was used, mainly the Typ 771/1 flat-8-cylinder, later also the F6.

The 1966 World Sportscar Championship began early, but at least one 906 was in Florida by 6 February 1966 for its debut in the 1966 24 Hours of Daytona. The new Carrera 6 finished 6th overall, behind the big-engine factory Fords and Ferrari, ahead of the factory-904s, and won its class against Ferrari Dino 206 Ps. At the end of March, at the 12 Hours of Sebring, no less than five 906 were at hand, again backed up by some 904. Hans Herrmann/Herbert Müller finished fourth overall and won the class ahead of the Ferrari, with two 906 and a 904 in close pursuit. Thus, the 906 had proven itself early, and in the important North American market.

The factory prototype did well in the first of a series of 1000 km races in Europe, held at Monza on the very fast banked version of the circuit, where the big 7-litre factory Ford were absent, the winning Ferrari 330P3 covered 100 laps, two private 4.7-litre Ford GT40 Mk.I Sportscars lapped 99 and 98 times, with the best 906 in the same lap at 4th, and some more 906 in 5th and 7th beating Fords and V12-Ferraris.

Porsche put some effort into the next event, the 1966 Targa Florio, but it was a private 906 sportscars that saved the rainy day, winning overall, while two factory prototypes even collided against each other. The 1000km races at Spa Francorchamps and the Nürburgring were also rather disappointing.

At the 1966 24 Hours of Le Mans, the factory only used the standard carburettor F6 engines, as the F8 and the fuel injected F6 were not reliable enough. They long tail bodies, though, and these prototypes placed 4-5-6 (and a Gr.4 S2.0 7th) behind three 7-litre V8 Ford GT40 Mk.II, outlasting all of the previously dominant V12-engined 4-litre Ferrari Ps and securing early both World Championships in their classes. Thus, the 906 had helped to achieve all of the goals that were set.

There were some more WC heats in which new tech was tested, soon leading to the Porsche 910.

=== 906 as Gr.4 Sportscar ===
Both the highlights and lowlights of the 2-litre Sportscar career came early. This class already was covered by older 904. As soon as homologation was valid, at the 1966 Targa Florio of 8 May 1966, no less than six mostly privately entered 906 sportscars showed up, plus prototypes mostly from the factory. It was the 906 Sportscar of Swiss Scuderia Filipinetti, driven by Willy Mairesse/Herbert Müller, which saved the day and secured the overall victory when the factory cars collided with each other, crashed or failed. Obviously the Swiss team also won the S 2.0 class that counted towards the 1966 World Sportscar Championship for Porsche. At the next round, the fast 1000km Spa, the same Swiss team and drivers switched over to their Ford GT40 Mk.I 5 litre Sportscar instead, but they were not among the Fords that finished 2-3-4-5. Six 906 sportscars had been entered, but only three started, and only the Racing Team Holland Gijs van Lennep entry finished, 15th, two laps behind a 1600cc Lotus Elan that took the only S 2.0 class win not scored by a 904 or 906 in the 1966 WSC.

For the 1966 1000km Nürburgring, the Targa winners picked a third Sportscar, a 3.3 litre Ferrari 250 LM, to split the pack of 906 sportscars that finished 7-8-10-11, thus the Alfa Romeo Giulia TZ which ranked 13th overall only was 5th in class and scored 3 points towards the WSC. In the 1966 24 Hours of Le Mans, the two 906 factory entrants in the S 2.0 class were the only sportscars that ran after the 20 hours mark, as the private French 906 had crashed and all seven big engine Fords and Ferrari sportscars had DNF. The engine in the Peter Gregg car did not restart in time before the race finish and was DNF, thus only the Günter Klass/Rolf Stommelen Carrera 6 completed the 4-5-6-7 sweep from Zuffenhausen, beating all Ferraris, many Fords, and all others. In addition, the first Porsche 911S had finished the race, too, running an engine that was similar to the 906 F6.

For the year of the car's debut in 1966, it achieved numerous victories in North America. American-British race car driver Ken Miles took the 2.0-liter class in the Las Vegas Stardust and Laguna Seca USRRC races. These victories didn't just stop in 1966, but went on through 1967 and 1968. Another well known Porsche driver by the name of Peter Gregg secured himself some wins at the Bahama Speed Weeks. As intended, not only were professional racers driving these sportscars that had been built by the dozens, but so was comedian Dick Smothers and Fred Baker. They secured eighth overall to win its 2.0-liter class in 1969.

== Construction ==
Unlike previous racing Porsches, the 906's body was tested in a wind tunnel, resulting in a top speed of 280 km/h (170 mph) at Le Mans, quite fast for a 2-liter engine car. At the time it showed a close resemblance to future Porsche racing cars. As in the Mercedes-Benz 300SL, gull-wing doors were fitted, and the mid-ship mounted engine was covered with a large plexiglas cover. The Porsche 906 was fitted with an 901 engine that actually came from the Porsche 911R just with a few modifications done to it. These changes included some exotic metals (titanium) in the connecting rods and the crank case (magnesium) to help the car perform at a higher level.

In order to save money, spare suspension components produced in advance for a possible new series of Porsche 904 had to be used for the 906, along with big 15-inch wheels. Yet, Formula One used lighter 13-inch wheels, and Porsche had already used Team Lotus suspension parts in earlier years. The wheels were bolted on with 5 nuts as in a road car, which cost time in pitstops compared to a single central nut. Porsche had reused a lot of different parts on the 906 like the suspension from the 904 and the engine from the 911, but they had also utilized the 5 speed manual gearbox that came from the Porsche 911.

To take advantage of the lighter wheels and F1 tyres, the Porsche 910 was developed and entered in mid-season of 1966, starting with the hillclimb from Sierre to Crans-Montana in Switzerland.
