= 1966 World Sportscar Championship =

Racing tournament

Seasons
- ← 1965 1967 →

The 1966 World Sportscar Championship season was the 14th season of the FIA "World Sportscar Championship" motor racing. It featured the 1966 International Manufacturers' Championship and the 1966 International Sports Car Championship, which were contested between 5 February 1966 and September 11, 1966, over a total of thirteen races. The International Manufacturers' Championship was open to Group 6 Sports-Prototypes (letter P on the cars) and was contested in two engine capacity divisions, P1 (Up to 2000cc) and P2 (Over 2000cc). The International Sports Car Championship was open to Group 4 Sports Cars (letter S on the cars) and was contested in three engine capacity divisions, S1 (Up to 1300cc), S2 (1301 to 2000cc) and S3 (Over 2000cc).

== Schedule ==
The 13 championship races each counted towards one or more of the five divisions.

Both championships scored points to the top six competitors in each class, under four different tables or 'Barème'. Barème I corresponded with the old order of 9-6-4-3-2-1. Barème II was in the order 10-7-5-4-3-2. Barème III, valid only for Le Mans, was in the order 12-9-7-5-4-3. Barème 0, valid only for the Grosser Bergpreis der Schweiz, was half of Barème I: 4.5-3-2-1.5-1-0.5. Constructors were only awarded points for their highest finishing car. Other finishers from the same manufacturer were merely skipped in the points count.

Only the best 4 results counted towards the championship (5 in S3, 6 in S2). Points earned but not counted towards the championship total are listed in (brackets).

IMC	ISCC S1	ISCC S2	ISCC S3	Race	Circuit or Location	Date
R 1	-	R 1	R 1	(United States) 24 Hours of Daytona	Daytona International Speedway	5 February; 6 February
R 2	R 1	R 2	R 2	(United States) 12 Hours of Sebring	Sebring International Raceway	26 March
R 3	-	R 3	R 3	(Italy) 1000km Monza	Autodromo Nazionale Monza	25 April
R 4	R 2	R 4	R 4	(Italy) 1966 Targa Florio	Circuito delle Madonie	8 May
R 5	-	R 5	R 5	(Belgium) 1000km Spa	Circuit de Spa-Francorchamps	25 May
R 6	R 3	R 6	R 6	(Germany) 1000km Nürburgring	Nürburgring	5 June
R 7	-	R 7	R 7	(France) 1966 24 Hours of Le Mans	Circuit de la Sarthe	18 June; 19 June
-	R 4	-	-	(Italy) Mugello 500 km	Mugello Circuit	17 July
-	R 5	-	-	(Italy) Coppa Città di Enna	Autodromo di Pergusa	7 August
R 8	-	R 8	-	(Germany) Großer Preis von Hockenheim	Hockenheimring	14 August
-	R 6	R 9	R 8	(Switzerland) Grosser Bergpreis der Schweiz	Crans-Montana	28 August
-	R 7	-	-	(Germany) 500 km Nürburgring	Nürburgring	4 September
-	R 8	R 10	R 9	(Austria) Austrian Sports Car Grand Prix	Zeltweg Airfield	11 September

Note: The Großer Preis von Hockenheim did not count towards the Over 2000cc division of the International Manufacturers Championship.

== Results ==
=== International Manufacturers Championship ===
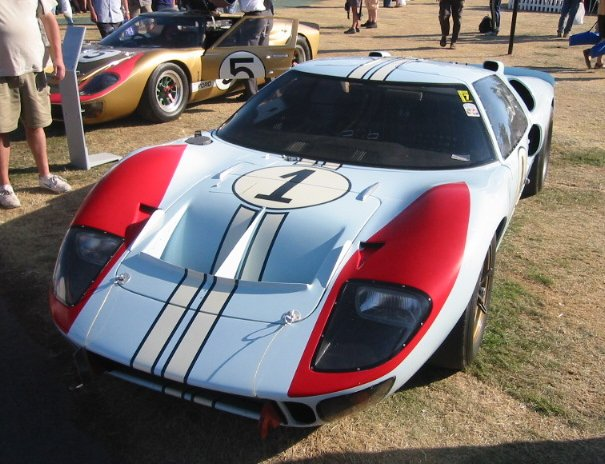
Ford won the Over 2000cc Division of the 1966 International Manufacturers Championship with the 7-litre Ford Mk II (pictured) & X-1 models.

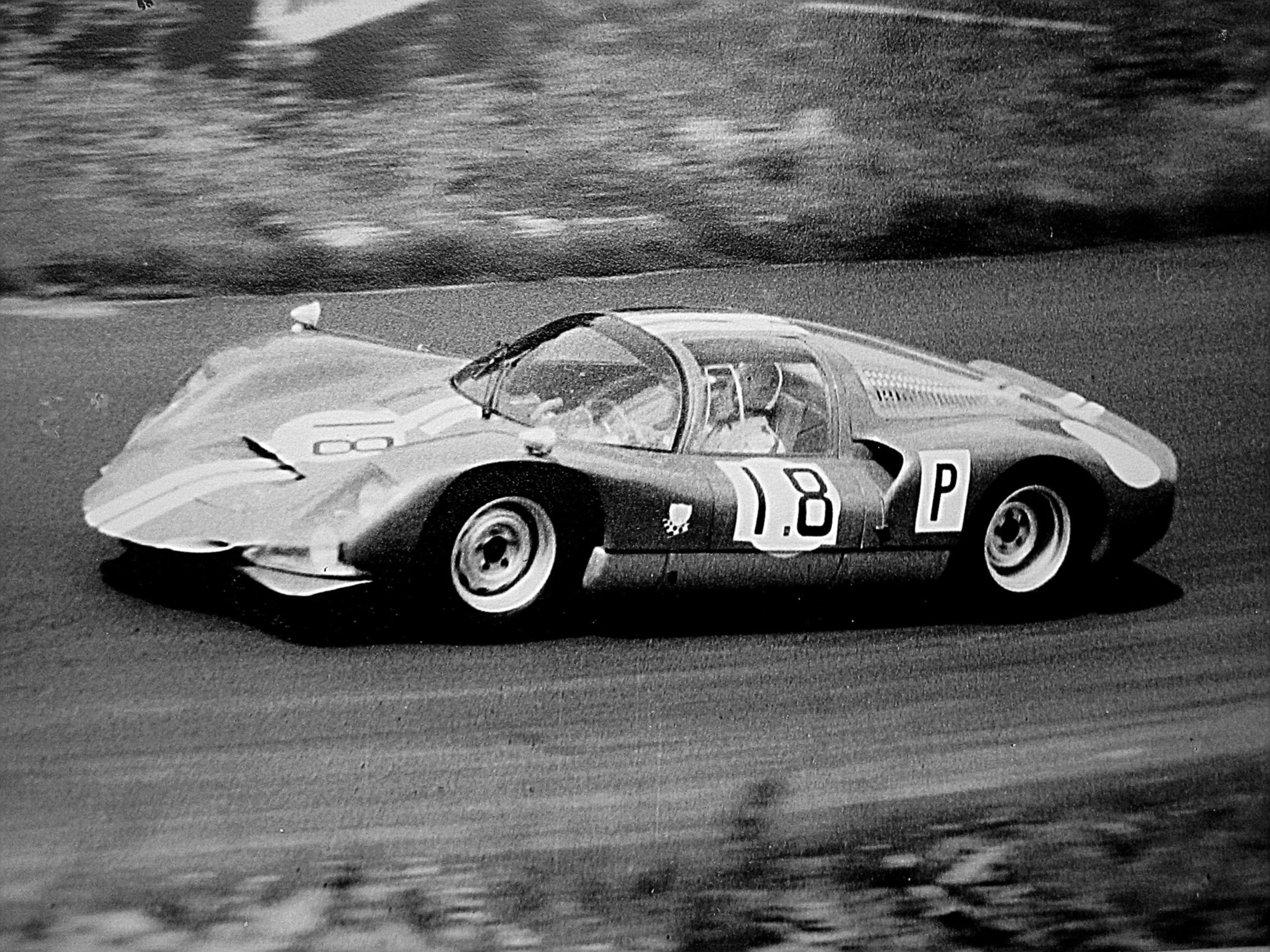
Porsche won the Up to 2000cc Division with the Porsche 906 as prototype

Position	Manufacturer	(United States) DAY	(United States) SEB	(Italy) MZA	(Italy) TGA	(Belgium) SPA	(West Germany) NÜR1	(France) LMS	(West Germany) HOC	Total
	Over 2000cc									
1	Ford	10	10	-	-	6	-	12	-	38
2	Ferrari	(4)	-	10	10	9	7	-	-	36
3	Chaparral Cars	-	-	-	-	-	10	-	-	10
	Up to 2000cc									
1	Porsche	10	10	10	-	-	(5)	12	(9)	42
2	Ferrari	-	7	(4)	10	9	10	-	-	36
3	Alpine	-	-	-	-	7	-	5	-	22
4	Austin-Healey	-	3	-	5	2	3	-	(2)	13
5	Triumph	7	-	-	-	-	-	-	-	7
6	Abarth	-	-	-	-	-	4	-	-	4
	ASA	-	-	-	4	-	-	-	-	4
8	Lotus	-	-	-	-	-	-	-	3	3

=== International Sports Car Championship ===
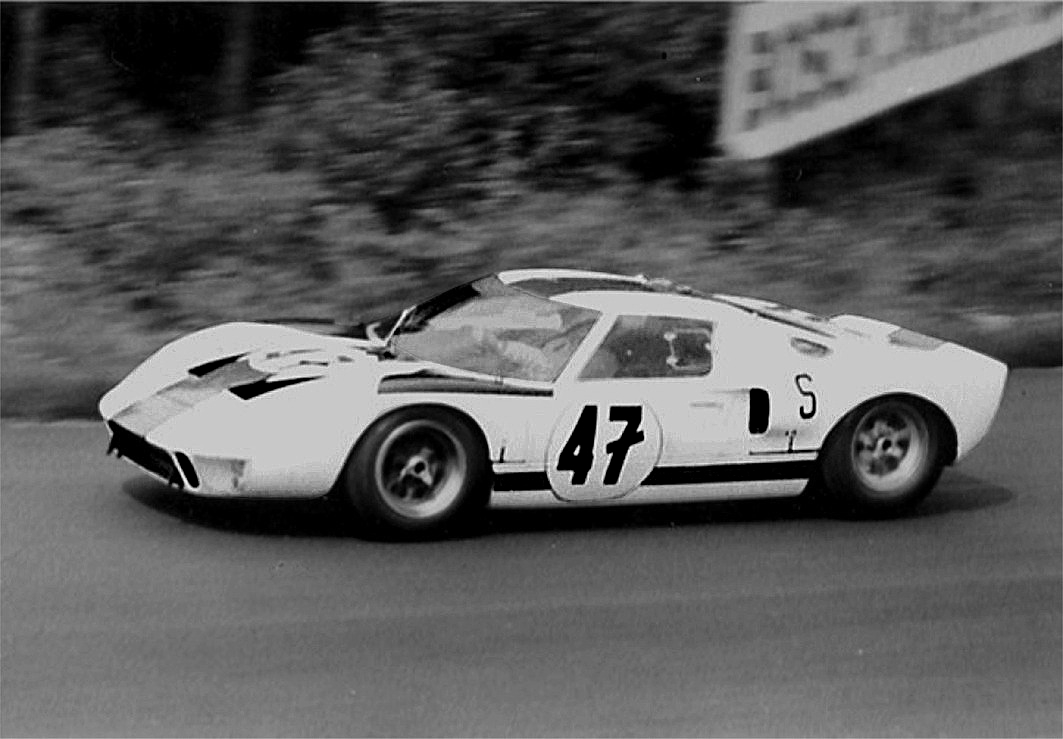
Ford GT40 Mk.I as Sportscar

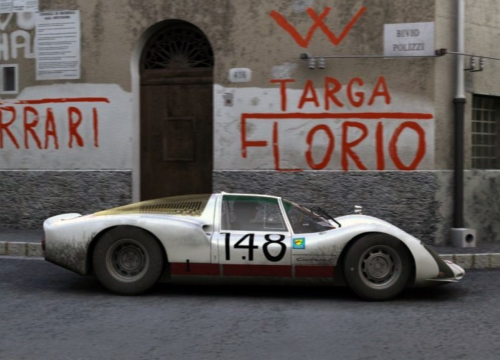
Porsche 906 as Sportscar, Winner of Targa Florio

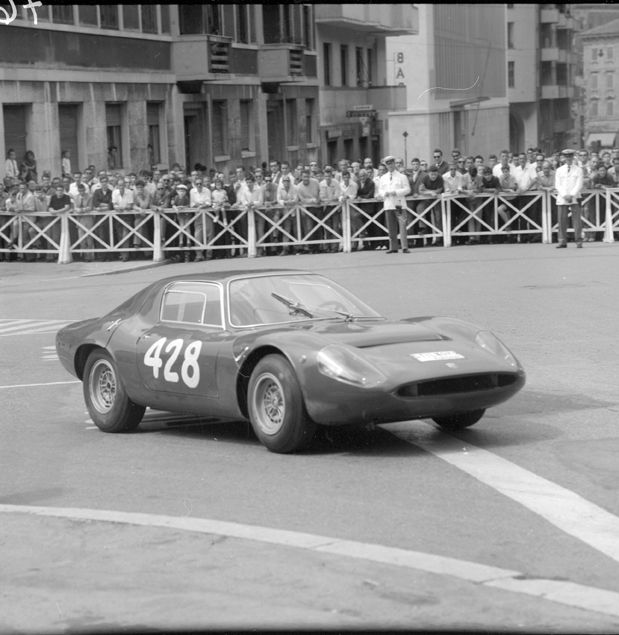
Abarth OT 1300

Position	Manufacturer	(United States) DAY	(United States) SEB	(Italy) MZA	(Italy) TGA	(Belgium) SPA	(West Germany) NÜR1	(France) LMS	(Italy) MUG	(Italy) PER	(West Germany) HOC	(Switzerland) SCH	(West Germany) NÜR2	(Austria) ZEL	Total
	Division I (Up to 1300cc)														
1	Abarth	-	-	-	-	-	10	-	9	9	-	(4.5)	9	(9)	37
2	Alpine	-	10	-	10	-	4	-	4	-	-	-	-	-	28
3	Alfa Romeo	-	-	-	3	-	-	-	-	-	-	-	-	-	3
	Division II (1301 to 2000cc)														
1	Porsche	10	10	-	10	(6)	10	12	-	-	9	(4.5)	-	(9)	61
2	Alfa Romeo	-	7	10	5	-	3	-	-	-	-	1	-	-	27
3	Lotus	-	-	-	-	9	-	-	-	-	-	-	-	-	9
4	Volvo	3	-	-	-	-	-	-	-	-	-	-	-	-	3
	Division III (Over 2000cc)														
1	Ford	10	10	10	10	9	(10)	-	-	-	-	-	-	(9)	49
2	Ferrari	5	-	4	7	3	-	-	-	-	-	-	-	4	23
3	Shelby	-	7	-	-	-	4	-	-	-	-	-	-	-	11

== The cars ==
The following models contributed to the nett points awarded to their respective manufacturers in the two championships.

International Manufacturers Championship - Over 2000cc

- Ford Mk II and Ford X-1
- Ferrari 365P2/3, Ferrari 330P3 & Ferrari 250 LM
- Chaparral 2D

International Manufacturers Championship - Up to 2000cc

- Porsche 906
- Dino 206 S
- Alpine-Renault A210
- Austin-Healey Sprite
- Triumph LM
- Abarth 1300 OT
- ASA 411
- Lotus 23B BMW

International Sports Car Championship - Division 1

- Abarth 1300 OT
- Alpine Renault M65 & Alpine Renault A110
- Alfa Romeo Giulietta SZ

International Sports Car Championship - Division 2

- Porsche 904 GTS & Porsche 906
- Alfa Romeo Giulia TZ2
- Lotus Elan
- Volvo P1800

International Sports Car Championship - Division 3

- Ford GT40
- Ferrari 250 GTO & Ferrari 250 LM
- Shelby Cobra
