= 1967 World Sportscar Championship =

Racing tournament

Seasons
- ← 1966 1968 →

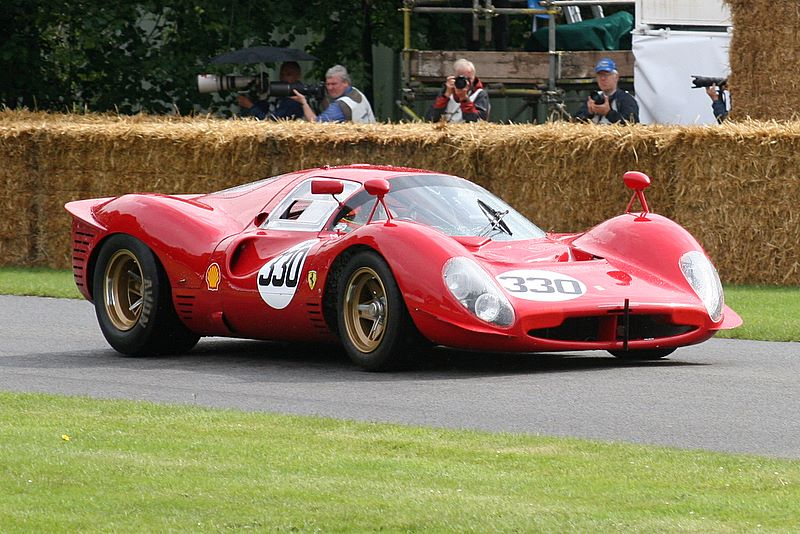
Ferrari won the Manufacturers Championship with the 330 P3 (pictured) & 330 P4

The 1967 World Sportscar Championship season was the 15th season of FIA World Sportscar Championship racing. It featured the International Championship for Sports-Prototypes and the International Championship for Sports Cars. The former was open to Group 6 Sports-Prototypes and the latter to Group 4 Sports Cars. The season ran from 4 February 1967 to 3 September 1967 and comprised 14 races in total.

This was the last championship season to include a hill climb event, due to safety concerns. Also, growing speed at Le Mans caused a controversial CSI decision to limit the engine capacity of Group 6 Sports-Prototypes to 3 litres, beginning in 1968.

== Schedule ==
Although the season was composed of 14 races, not all races counted as rounds for both championships and each class did not compete in all events. Some events also included classes for GT cars and Touring Cars although these cars were not eligible to score championship points.

ICSP Rd	ICSC Div 1 Rd	ICSC Div 2 Rd	ICSC Div 3 Rd	Race	Circuit or Location	Competitors	Date
1	-	1	1	(United States) 24 Hours of Daytona	Daytona International Speedway	All	4 February; 5 February
2	-	2	2	(United States) 12 Hours of Sebring	Sebring International Raceway	All	1 April
3	-	3	3	(Italy) 1000km Monza	Autodromo Nazionale Monza	All	25 April
4	-	4	4	(Belgium) 1000km Spa	Circuit de Spa-Francorchamps	All	1 May
5	-	5	5	(Italy) Targa Florio	Circuito Piccolo delle Madonie	All	14 May
6	1	6	6	(Germany) 1000km Nürburgring	Nürburgring	All	28 May
7	-	7	7	(France) 24 Hours of Le Mans	Circuit de la Sarthe	All	10 June; 11 June
-	2	-	-	(Germany) Sports Car Grand Prix	Hockenheimring	Sports/GT	9 July
-	3	8	-	(Italy) Mugello 500 km	Mugello Circuit	All	23 July
8	-	9	8	(United Kingdom) BOAC 500 (6 Hours)	Brands Hatch	Proto/Sports	30 July
-	4	-	-	(Italy) Coppa Citta di Enna	Autodromo di Pergusa	Proto/Sports	6 August
-	5	10	9	(Austria) Sports Car Grand Prix Österrich	Zeltweg Airfield	Sports	20 August
-	6	11	10	(Switzerland) Swiss Mountain Grand Prix	Villars-sur-Ollon	All	27 August
-	7	-	-	(Germany) 500 km Nürburgring	Nürburgring	All	3 September

== Races ==
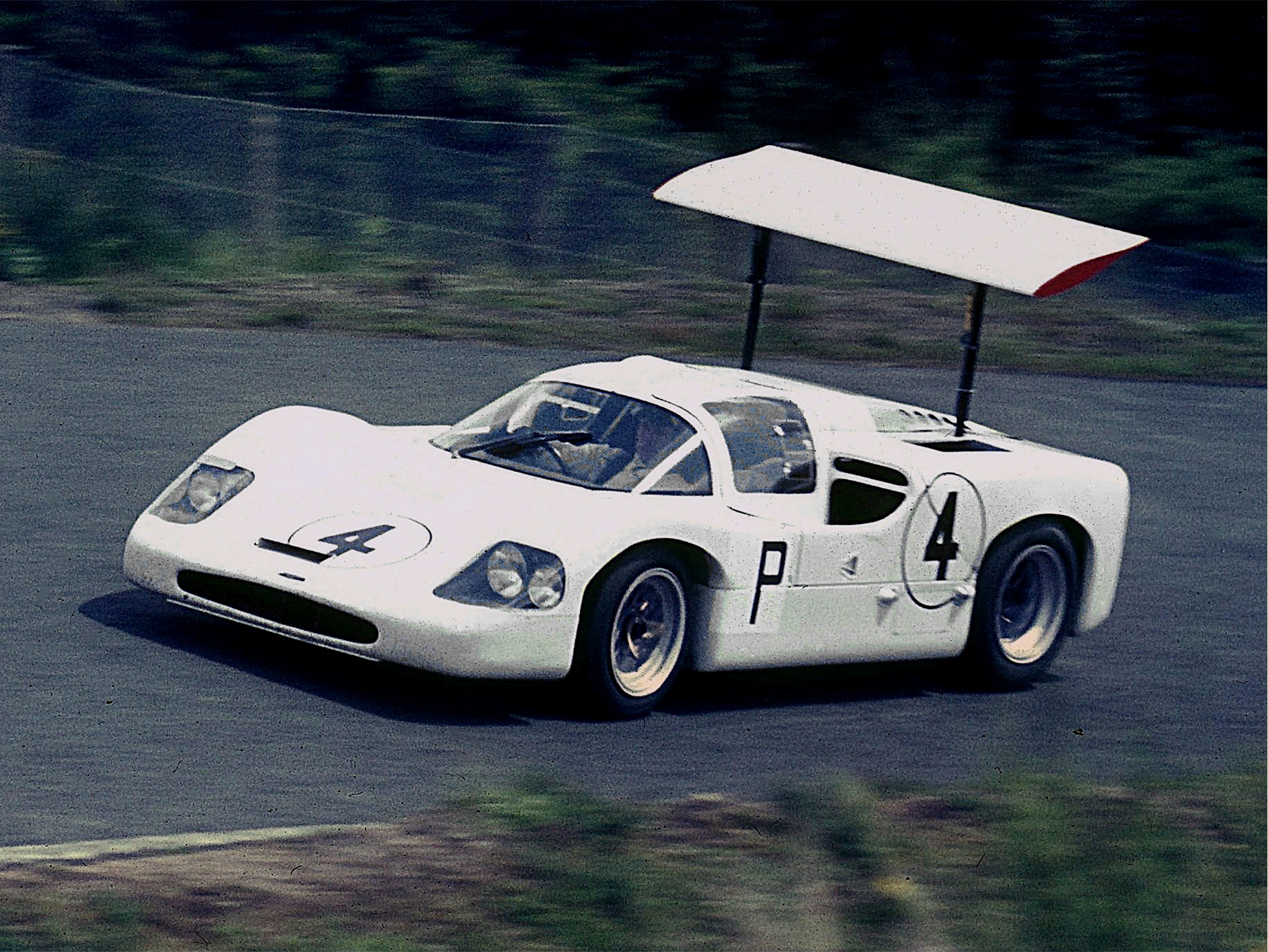
A Chaparral 2F competing in the Group 6 category at the 1967 1000km Nürburgring.

Race	Circuit	Prototype Winning Team	Sportscar Winning Team	GT Winning Team	Results
Race	Circuit	Prototype Winning Drivers	Sportscar Winning Drivers	GT Winning Drivers	Results
1	Daytona	(Italy) #23 SpA Ferrari SEFAC	(United Kingdom) #11 J.W. Automotive	(United States) #54 Jack Ryan	Results
1	Daytona	(Italy) Lorenzo Bandini (New Zealand) Chris Amon	(United States) Dick Thompson (Belgium) Jacky Ickx	(United States) Jack Ryan (United States) Bill Bencker	Results
2	Sebring	(United States) #1 Ford Motor Co.	(Italy) #19 Scuderia Brescia Corse	(United States) #46 Robert Kirby	Results
2	Sebring	(United States) Mario Andretti (New Zealand) Bruce McLaren	(Italy) Nino Vaccarella (Italy) Umberto Maglioli	(United States) Robert Kirby (United States) Alan Johnson	Results
3	Monza	(Italy) #3 SpA Ferrari SEFAC	#33 Ford France	(United Kingdom) Paul Vestey	Results
3	Monza	(Italy) Lorenzo Bandini (New Zealand) Chris Amon	(France) Jo Schlesser (France) Guy Ligier	(United Kingdom) Paul Vestey (Portugal) Carlos Gaspar	Results
4	Spa	(United Kingdom) #6 J.W. Automotive	(United Kingdom) #41 Dawnay Racing	(United Kingdom) #71 British Motor Co.	Results
4	Spa	(United States) Dick Thompson (Belgium) Jacky Ickx	(United Kingdom) Jackie Oliver (United Kingdom) Mike Salmon	(United Kingdom) Roger Enever (United Kingdom) Alec Poole	Results
5	Piccolo delle Madonie	(Germany) #184 Porsche System Eng.	#130 Ford France S.A.	(Germany) #46 Porsche System Eng.	Results
5	Piccolo delle Madonie	(Germany) Rolf Stommelen (Australia) Paul Hawkins	(France) Jean-Michel Giorgi (France) Henri Greder	(France) Bernard Cahier (France) Jean-Claude Killy	Results
6	Nürburgring	(Germany) #17 Porsche System Eng.	(Germany) #70 Scuderia Lufthansa	(Germany) #75 IGFA	Results
6	Nürburgring	(Germany) Udo Schütz (United States) Joe Buzzetta	(Germany) Hans-Dieter Dechent (Germany) Robert Huhn	(Germany) Helmut Kelleners (Germany) Jürgen Neuhaus	Results
7	La Sarthe	(United States) #1 Shelby-American Inc.	(Germany) #37 Porsche System Eng.	(Switzerland) #28 Scuderia Filipinetti	Results
7	La Sarthe	(United States) Dan Gurney (United States) A. J. Foyt	(United Kingdom) Vic Elford (Netherlands) Ben Pon	(Switzerland) Rico Steinemann (Switzerland) Dieter Spoerry	Results
8	Hockenheimring	Did Not Participate	(Italy) #3 Abarth	(Belgium) #29 "Jean-Pierre"	Results
8	Hockenheimring		(Netherlands) Toine Hezemans	(Belgium) "Jean-Pierre"	Results
9	Mugello	(Germany) #1 Porsche System	(Italy) #63 No Team Name	(Italy) #133 No Team Name	Results
9	Mugello	(Germany) Gerhard Mitter (Germany) Udo Schütz	(Italy) Leo Cella (Italy) Giampiero Biscaldi	(Italy) Luigi Cabella (Italy) Giovanni Marini	Results
10	Brands Hatch	(United States) #1 Chaparral Cars Inc.	(United Kingdom) #72 A.G. Dean Racing Ltd.	Did Not Participate	Results
10	Brands Hatch	(United States) Phil Hill (United Kingdom) Mike Spence	(United Kingdom) Tony Dean (Netherlands) Ben Pon		Results
11	Pergusa	(Switzerland) #62 No Team Name	(Italy) #80 Scuderia Brescia Corse	Did Not Participate	Results
11	Pergusa	(Switzerland) Dieter Spoerry	(Italy) Nino Vaccarella		Results
12	Zeltweg	Did Not Participate	(Australia) #5 Paul Hawkins	Did Not Participate	Results
12	Zeltweg		(Australia) Paul Hawkins		Results
13	Villars-sur-Ollon	(Germany) #196 Porsche System	(Australia) #160 OASC	Did Not Participate	Results
13	Villars-sur-Ollon	(Germany) Gerhard Mitter	(Australia) Rudi Lins		Results
14	Nürburgring	(France) #2 Alpine	(Italy) #42 Abarth	(United Kingdom) #58 Motor Racing Stables	Results
14	Nürburgring	(France) Roger Delageneste	(Germany) Ernst Furtmayer	(Japan) Tetsu Ikuzawa	Results

== Results ==
=== Manufacturers' Championship ===
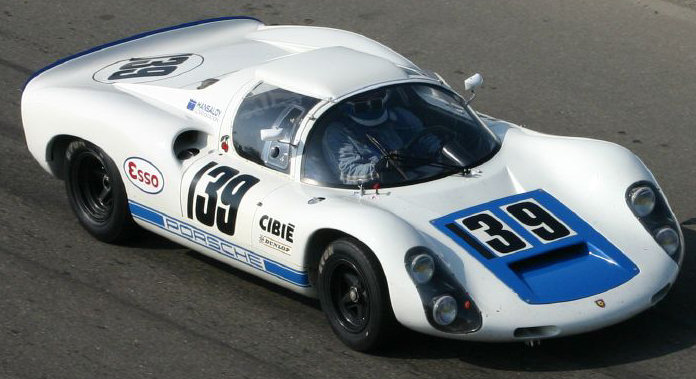
Porsche placed second in the Manufacturers Championship with the 910.

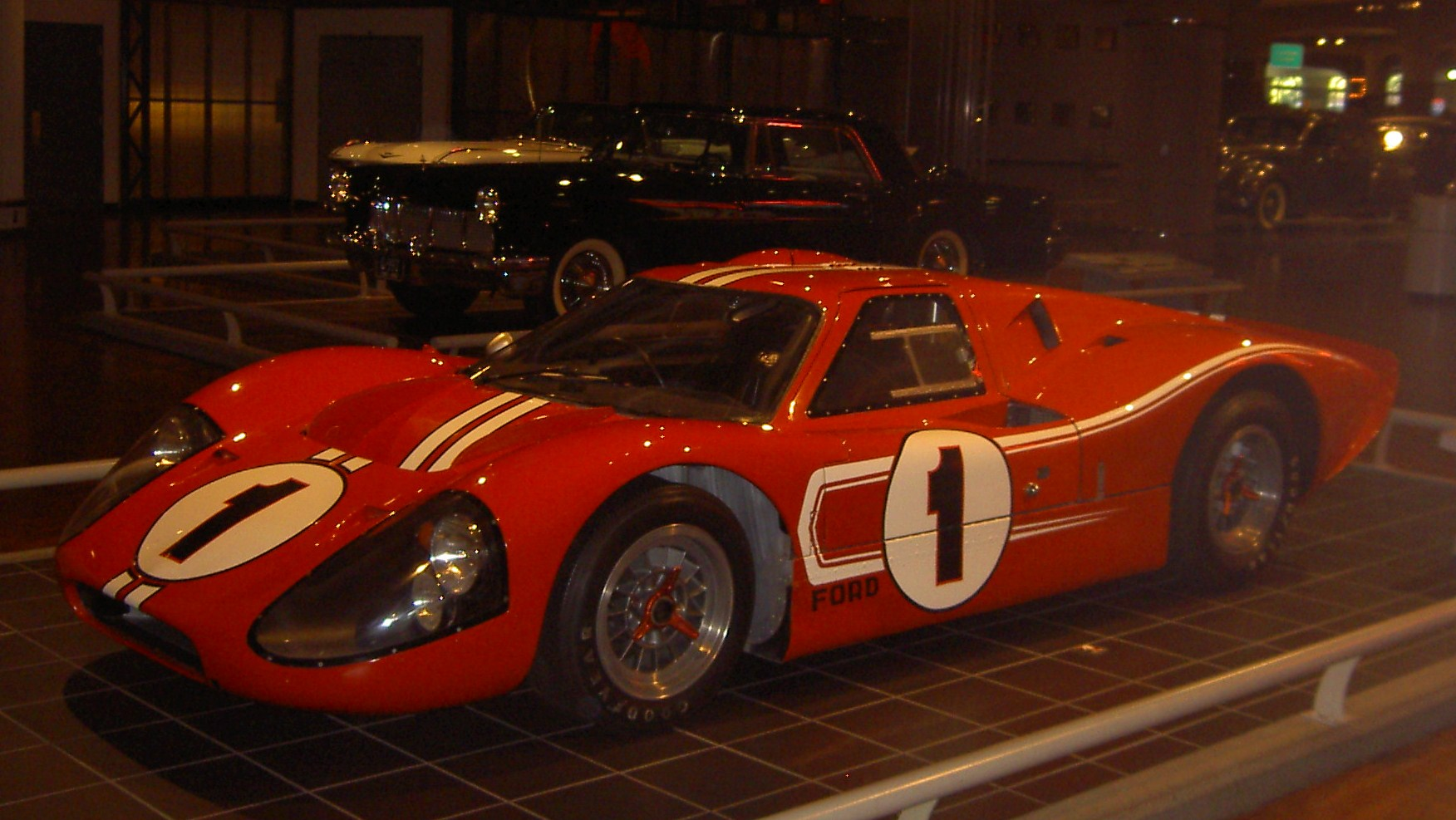
Ford placed third in the Manufacturers Championship with the Mk II and Mk IV (pictured).

All championships scored points to the top six competitors in each class, in the order of 9-6-4-3-2-1. Only the best five finishes counted towards the championship, with skipped points marked in parentheses.

Manufacturers were only awarded points for their highest finishing car, but other finishers from the same manufacturer could prevent competitors from scoring points. For example, at Daytona, Ferrari scored a 1-2-3 result with 9 points awarded in the P+2.0 category, followed by two 2000cc Porsche prototypes which received 3 points (plus 9 in the P2.0 Division), and the 6th-best prototype, a Ford Mk.II in 7th overall, collected a single point.

==== Prototypes over 2000 cc ====
This championship was for all Prototype class cars over 2000 cc.

Controversy arose about the Mirage of John Wyer, which had won at Spa. As it was a modified Ford GT40 with Ford engines, Ford argued that it should count towards Ford's tally. As the CSI declined and Ford had no realistic chances to defend the championship without those points, Ford concentrated the solely on Le Mans and did not send its prototypes to the Nurburgring or Brands Hatch events.

Pos	Manufacturer	(United States) DAY	(United States) SEB	(Italy) MZA	(Belgium) SPA	(Italy) TGA	(West Germany) NÜR1	(France) LMS	(United Kingdom) BRH	Total
1	(Italy) Ferrari	9		9	4	(3)		6	6	34
2	(Germany) Porsche	(3)	4	4	6	9	9	(2)	(4)	32
3	(United States) Ford	1	9	1	(1)	2		9		22
4=	(United Kingdom) Mirage-Ford				9					9
4=	(United States) Chaparral								9	9
6	(United Kingdom) Lola-Chevrolet				3					3
7	(Italy) Alfa Romeo						2			2

==== Prototypes under 2000 cc ====
This championship was for all Prototype class cars under 2000 cc.

Pos	Manufacturer	(United States) DAY	(United States) SEB	(Italy) MZA	(Belgium) SPA	(Italy) TGA	(West Germany) NÜR1	(France) LMS	(United Kingdom) BRH	Total
1	(Germany) Porsche	9	9	9	9	9	(9)	(9)	(6)	45
2	(United Kingdom) Lotus								9	9
3	(Italy) Alfa Romeo				4		3			7
4=	(France) Alpine				2			4		6
4=	(United Kingdom) Chevron						2		4	6
6	(Italy) Ferrari					4				4

=== International Championship for Sports Cars ===
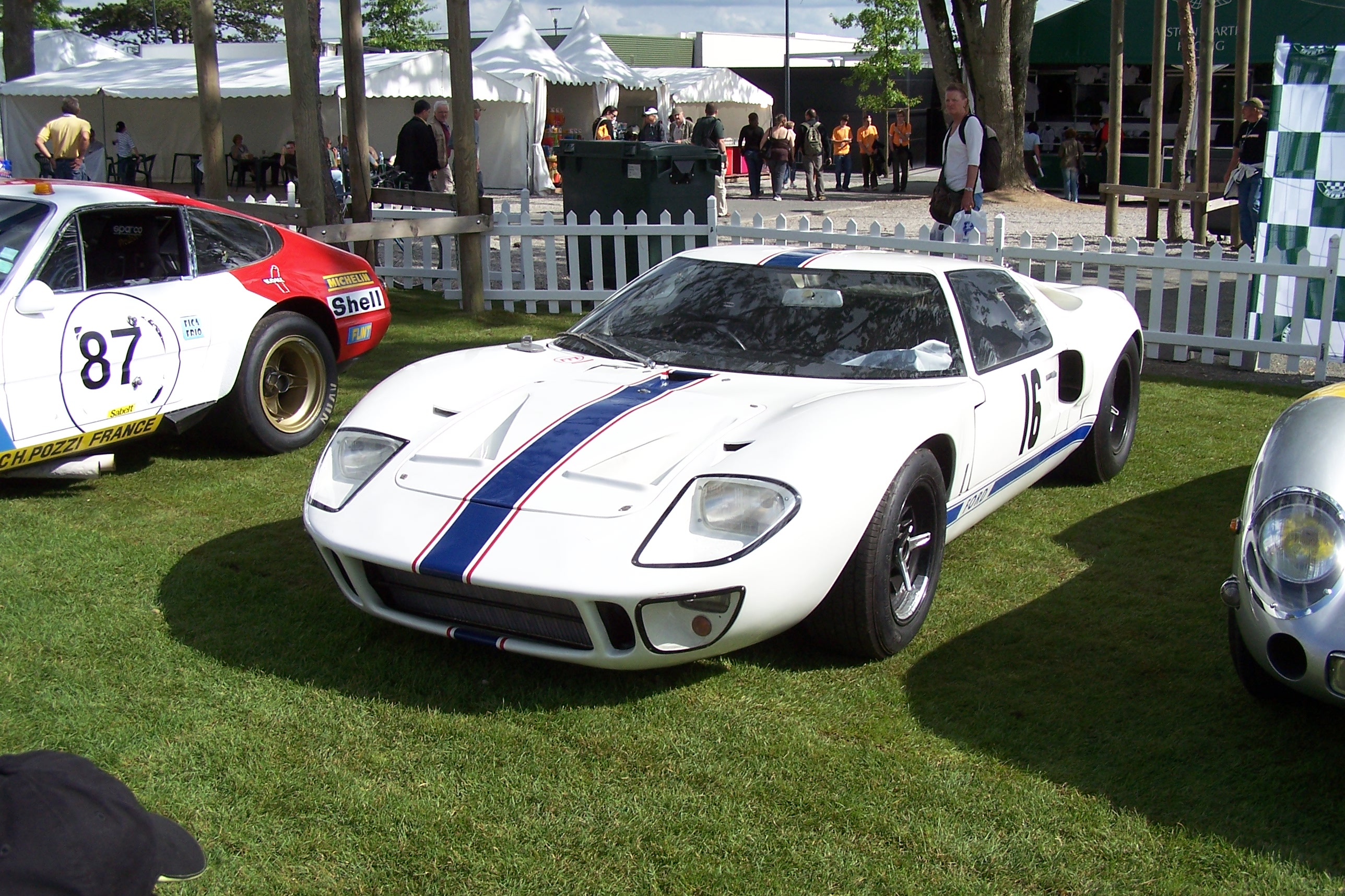
Ford won the Over 2000cc Division of the International Championship for Sports Cars with the GT40.

Championship points were awarded on a 9-6-4-3-2-1 for the first six positions in each relevant division at each race except for the Swiss Mountain Grand Prix at which half points were awarded. Only the highest placed car from each manufacturer in each division was eligible to score points for its manufacturer. Not all race results could be counted towards the championship totals and discarded points are shown within brackets in the table below.

Pos.	Manufacturer	(United States) DAY	(United States) SEB	(Italy) MZA	(Belgium) SPA	(Italy) TGA	(West Germany) NÜR1	(France) LMS	(West Germany) HOC	(Italy) MUG	(United Kingdom) BRH	(Italy) PER	(Austria) ZEL	(Switzerland) VSO	(West Germany) NÜR2	Total
	Division I (1300cc)															
1	Abarth	-	-	-	-	-	-	-	9	9	-	9	9	(4.5)	9	45
2	Diva	-	-	-	-	-	9	-	-	-	-	-	-	-	3	12
3	Austin-Healey	-	-	-	-	-	-	-	-	4	-	-	-	-	-	4
4	Saab	-	-	-	-	-	-	-	-	-	-	-	-	1	-	1
5	Triumph	-	-	-	-	-	-	-	-	-	-	-	-	0.5	-	0.5
	Division II (2000cc)															
1	Porsche	-	9	9	-	-	9	9	-	9	9	-	9	(4.5)	-	63
2	Alfa Romeo	-	-	-	-	-	6	-	-	3	-	-	-	-	-	9
3	Lotus	-	-	-	-	-	-	-	-	-	-	-	-	0.5	-	0.5
	Division III (+2000cc)															
1	Ford	9	9	9	9	9	9	-	-	-	(6)	-	(9)	-	-	54
2	Ferrari	4	-	4	-	-	3	-	-	-	9	-	4	4.5	-	28.5
3	Shelby	-	-	-	-	-	-	-	-	-	-	-	-	3	-	6
	Austin-Healey	-	-	-	-	6	-	-	-	-	-	-	-	-	-	6
