= Ferrari 250 LM =

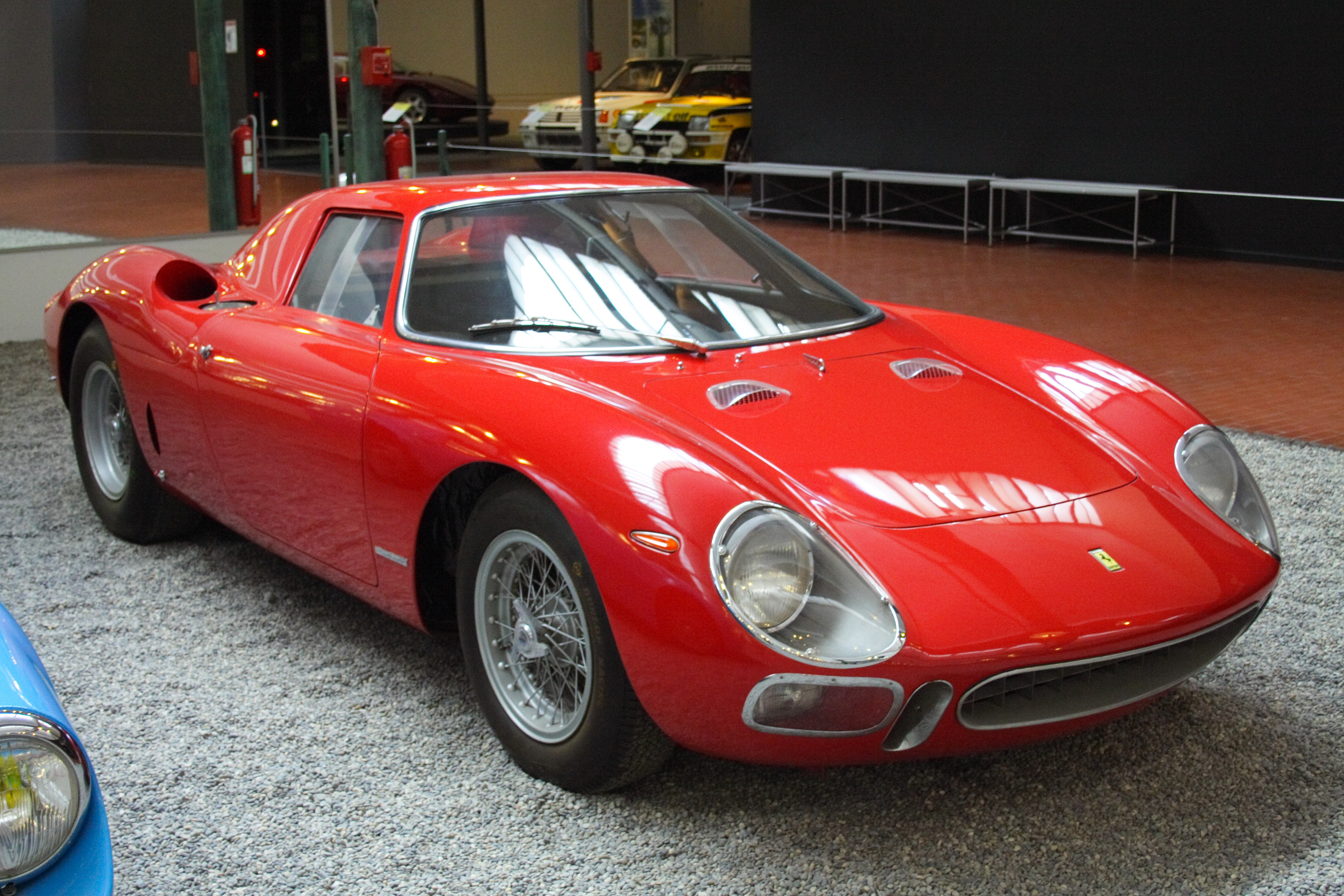
- Ferrari 250 LM

Overview
- Production: 1963-1966; 32 produced

Powertrain
- Engine: 3.3L (3285.72 cc) V12
- Transmission: 5-speed

The Ferrari 250 LM is a sports car produced by Ferrari between 1963 and 1966 as a berlinetta version of the 250 P prototype race car.

== Development ==
Having previously succeeded in homologating the 250 GTO for Group 3 GT racing as a variant of the production 250-series, Ferrari tried to get the even more different now mid-engined 250 LM design approved as a 250-based car as well, meaning that Ferrari would have avoided needing to build 100 production examples of the 250 LM. This was rejected by the FIA meaning that the 250 LM was limited to racing only in the prototype race car class in which Ferrari already had more potent cars.

With the rejection of the 250 LM in the Group 3 GT race series, the engine was changed from the previously required 3-litre engine (known in Ferrari models as the 250 engine) to a larger 3.3-litre engine for the production series. Despite this, the car was not seen as being competitive with the other prototype racers Ferrari had and all examples of the 250 LM were sold to privateer racers.

== Racing results ==
During the 1965 24 Hours of Le Mans, Ferrari had its factory racing team use the Ferrari 330 P2 while a number of 250 LMs were entered by privateer teams. While all 330 P2s ended up breaking down, a Ferrari 250 LM raced by North American Racing Team (NART) finished first, being the last Ferrari to win Le Mans until 2023.

== Chassis numbers ==
Chassis no.	Note	Paint
5149	Destroyed in a fire and rebuilt, then destroyed in a fire again and rebuilt again.	Red
5841		Red with blue stripe
5843	Destroyed in a crash and rebuilt.	Yellow
5845	Destroyed in a crash and rebuilt.	Red
5891		Red
5893	Winner of the 1965 24 Hours of Le Mans. Sold in 2025 for €34,880,000.	Red
5895		Red with blue livery
5897	Destroyed in a fire and rebuilt, then crashed and rebuilt again.	Red
5899	Destroyed in a crash and rebuilt, then destroyed in a crash again and rebuilt again.	Red
5901		Red with white livery
5903		Yellow with decals
5905	Destroyed in a fire and rebuilt.	Red
5907		Red with blue livery and decals
5909		Red with white livery and decals
5975		Red
5995		Silver with livery
6023		Yellow
6025	Never raced, built with red leather interior and electric windows	White with blue stripe
6045	Destroyed in a fire and rebuilt.	Dark red
6047		
6051		Red
6053		Red
6105	Sold in 2015 for $17,600,000.	Red
6107		Red with decals
6119		Red with white stripe
6167	Destroyed in a crash and rebuilt.	Verde Bottiglia
6173	Destroyed in a crash and rebuilt.	Red with decals
6217		Red
6233		Red with decals
6313		Yellow with decals
6321		Red with decals
8165		Green
