= 1964 Trophées de France season =

1964 Trophées de France

Seasons
- ← none 1965 →

The 1964 FFSA Trophées de France season was the inaugural season of the Trophées de France championship for Formula Two cars. After five rounds Jack Brabham and Denny Hulme were level on points. Brabham won the last round, the Grand Prix de l'ile de France, and took the title.

== FFSA Trophées de France ==
Champion: (Australia) Jack Brabham

Runner Up: (New Zealand) Denny Hulme

=== Participants ===
Team	Constructor	Car	Driver
(United Kingdom) Brabham Racing Organisation	Brabham	Brabham-Cosworth BT10	(Australia) Jack Brabham
(United Kingdom) Brabham Racing Organisation	Brabham	Brabham-Cosworth BT10	(New Zealand) Denny Hulme
(United Kingdom) Roy Winkelmann Racing	Brabham	Brabham-Cosworth BT10	(United Kingdom) Alan Rees
(United Kingdom) Ron Harris – Team Lotus	Lotus	Lotus-Cosworth 32	(United Kingdom) Jim Clark
(United Kingdom) Ron Harris – Team Lotus	Lotus	Lotus-Cosworth 32	(United Kingdom) Jackie Stewart
(United Kingdom) Ron Harris – Team Lotus	Lotus	Lotus-Cosworth 32	(United Kingdom) Mike Spence
(United Kingdom) Ron Harris – Team Lotus	Lotus	Lotus-Cosworth 32	(United Kingdom) Brian Hart
(United Kingdom) Ron Harris – Team Lotus	Lotus	Lotus-Cosworth 32	(United Kingdom) Peter Arundell
(United Kingdom) Ron Harris – Team Lotus	Lotus	Lotus-Cosworth 32	(United Kingdom) Peter Procter
(United Kingdom) Ron Harris – Team Lotus	Lotus	Lotus-Cosworth 32	(United Kingdom) David Hobbs
(United Kingdom) Midland Racing Partnership	Lola	Lola-Cosworth T54; Lola-Cosworth T55	(United Kingdom) Richard Attwood
(United Kingdom) Midland Racing Partnership	Lola	Lola-Cosworth T54; Lola-Cosworth T55	(United Kingdom) Bill Bradley
(United Kingdom) Midland Racing Partnership	Lola	Lola-Cosworth T54; Lola-Cosworth T55	(South Africa) Tony Maggs
(United Kingdom) Midland Racing Partnership	Lola	Lola-Cosworth T54; Lola-Cosworth T55	(New Zealand) Chris Amon
(United Kingdom) Midland Racing Partnership	Lola	Lola-Cosworth T54; Lola-Cosworth T55	(United States) Richie Ginther
(United Kingdom) Midland Racing Partnership	Lola	Lola-Cosworth T54; Lola-Cosworth T55	(United Kingdom) Brian Hart
(United Kingdom) Normand Racing Team Ltd	Cooper	Cooper-Cosworth T71	(United Kingdom) Mike Beckwith
(United Kingdom) Normand Racing Team Ltd	Cooper	Cooper-Cosworth T71	(United Kingdom) Warwick Banks
(United Kingdom) Normand Racing Team Ltd	Cooper	Cooper-Cosworth T71	(United Kingdom) Tony Hegbourne
Ecurie Ford France SA	Brabham	Brabham-Cosworth BT6; Brabham-Cosworth BT10	(France) Jo Schlesser
Ecurie Ford France SA	Brabham	Brabham-Cosworth BT6; Brabham-Cosworth BT10	(France) Guy Ligier
(Austria) Ford Motor Co.	Brabham	Brabham-Cosworth BT10	(Austria) Jochen Rindt
(United Kingdom) John Willment Automobiles	Alexis	Alexis-Cosworth Mk.4	(Australia) Paul Hawkins (Australia) Frank Gardner
(United Kingdom) John Willment Automobiles	Lotus	Lotus-Cosworth 27; Lotus-Cosworth 32	(Australia) Paul Hawkins (Australia) Frank Gardner
(France) Société des Automobiles Alpine	Alpine	Alpine-Renault A270	(United Kingdom) Graham Hill
(France) Société des Automobiles Alpine	Alpine	Alpine-Renault A270	(France) Jacques Maglia
(France) Société des Automobiles Alpine	Alpine	Alpine-Renault A270	(France) Jean Vinatier
(France) Société des Automobiles Alpine	Alpine	Alpine-Renault A270	(Belgium) Mauro Bianchi
(France) Société des Automobiles Alpine	Alpine	Alpine-Renault A270	(France) José Rosinski
(France) Ecurie Deutsch et Bonnet	Bonnet	René Bonnet 1 - Renault	(France) Gérard Laureau
(France) Ecurie Deutsch et Bonnet	Bonnet	René Bonnet 1 - Renault	(France) Jean-Pierre Beltoise
(France) Ecurie Deutsch et Bonnet	Bonnet	René Bonnet 1 - Renault	(France) Pierre Monneret
(France) Ecurie Deutsch et Bonnet	Bonnet	René Bonnet 1 - Renault	(Switzerland) Jean-Claude Rudaz
(France) Ecurie Deutsch et Bonnet	Bonnet	René Bonnet 1 - Renault	(France) Roland Charriére
(France) Maurice Trintignant	Gemini	Gemini-Cosworth Mk.4	(France) Maurice Trintignant

=== Results ===
#	Date	Name	Circuit	Winning driver	Winning team	Winning car	Report
1	05/04	Grand Prix de Pau	(France) Pau	(United Kingdom) Jim Clark	Ron Harris – Team Lotus	Lotus-Cosworth 32	Report
2	24/05	Grand Prix de Berlin	(Germany) Avus	(United Kingdom) Tony Hegbourne	Normand Racing Team Ltd	Cooper-Cosworth T71	Report
3	05/07	Grand Prix de Reims	(France) Reims	(United Kingdom) Alan Rees	Roy Winkelmann Racing	Brabham-Cosworth BT10	Report
4	19/07	Trophée d'Auvergne	(France) Clermont-Ferrand	(New Zealand) Denny Hulme	Brabham Racing Development	Brabham-Cosworth BT10	Report
5	13/09	Grand Prix de l'Albi	(France) Albi	(Australia) Jack Brabham	Brabham Racing Organisation	Brabham-Cosworth BT10	Report
6	27/09	Grand Prix de l'Ile de France	(France) Montlhéry	(Australia) Jack Brabham	Brabham Racing Organisation	Brabham-Cosworth BT10	Report
	Source:						

=== Standings ===
Place	Driver	PAU	AVU	REI	CLF	ALB	MON	Total
1	(Australia) Jack Brabham			2		1	1	24
2	(New Zealand) Denny Hulme	Ret	3	5	1	Ret	Ret	15
3	(United Kingdom) Alan Rees			1	6	3	Ret	13
4	(United Kingdom) Jim Clark	1		4		Ret		12
5	(United Kingdom) Richard Attwood	2	Ret	6	Ret	2	Ret	12
6	(United Kingdom) Jackie Stewart				2	Ret	2	12
7	(United Kingdom) Tony Hegbourne	6	1	Ret		Ret	7	9
8	(United Kingdom) Peter Procter		2	9	5		Ret	8
9	(France) Jo Schlesser		5	Ret	Ret	DNS	3	6
10	(Austria) Jochen Rindt		Ret	17	3	Ret	Ret	5
11	(United Kingdom) Mike Spence		Ret	3		Ret		5
12	(United Kingdom) Peter Arundell	3		Ret				5
13	(France) José Rosinski	4		Ret	7	8	Ret	3
14	(Australia) Paul Hawkins	7				4		3
15	(South Africa) Tony Maggs	9		15	4	Ret	11	3
16	(United Kingdom) Brian Hart		13	Ret		Ret	4	3
17	(Australia) Frank Gardner	Ret	4	Ret	Ret	Ret		3
18	(United Kingdom) Mike Beckwith	Ret	8	12	8	5	8	2
19	(New Zealand) Chris Amon					Ret	5	2
20	(Belgium) Mauro Bianchi	5		Ret				2
21	(France) Guy Ligier					6	6	0
22	(United Kingdom) David Prophet		6	14				0
23	(France) Jean Vinatier				10	7		0
24	(Switzerland) Silvio Moser		7	Ret				0
25	(Switzerland) Jo Siffert			7				0
=26	(United Kingdom) David Hobbs		Ret	8				0
=26	(France) Gérard Laureau	8		Ret				0
28	(France) Jacques Maglia	10		13	9	Ret	10	0
29	(United Kingdom) Graham Hill	DNS		Ret			9	0
30	(Germany) Günther Schramm		9					0
31	(United Kingdom) Bill Bradley		10		12			0
32	(United Kingdom) Rodney Bloor			10	DNS			0
33	(United Kingdom) John Ampt			11	13			0
34	(Belgium) Teddy Pilette				11			0
35	(Italy) Giacomo Russo		11					0
36	(Canada) Peter Broeker		12					0
37	(Switzerland) Jean-Claude Rudaz				14			0
38	(France) Roland Charriére				15			0
39	(United Kingdom) Warwick Banks				16			0
40	(France) Pierre Monneret			16				0
-	(France) Jean-Pierre Beltoise	Ret						0
-	(France) Maurice Trintignant	Ret						0
-	(United States) Richie Ginther			Ret				0
