= 1965 24 Hours of Le Mans =

24-hour sportscar endurance race

Previous: 1964	Next: 1966
Index: Races | Winners

The 1965 24 Hours of Le Mans was the 33rd Grand Prix of Endurance, and took place on 19 and 20 June 1965. It was also the twelfth round of the World Sportscar Championship.

After the disappointing results of the previous year's race, Ford returned with an improved version of its GT. There were 11 Fords or Ford-engined cars in the field. To meet that challenge, Ferrari had no fewer than 12 of their cars. Porsche dominated the medium-engined category with seven cars and Alpine-Renault likewise dominated the small-engine categories with six entries.

Despite a strong start, in the end the Fords’ unreliability let them down again and it was an easy victory for Ferrari for the sixth successive year. After the failure of the works team, the winners were Masten Gregory and Jochen Rindt in the North American Racing Team (NART) car – the first non-works team to win since Ecurie Ecosse in 1957. It was also the first international race victory for Goodyear tyres. This race would also prove to be the last Ferrari victory at Le Mans until 2023.

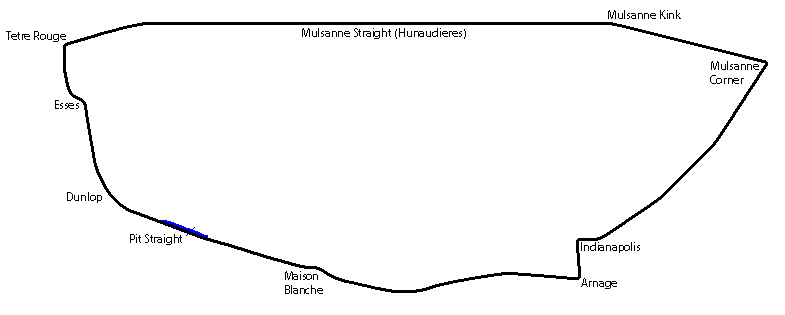
Le Mans in 1965

== Regulations ==
In the year since the last race, plans had got underway to develop a permanent track. Charles Deutsch, erstwhile French car manufacturer, was the design consultant for the project that eventually became the Bugatti Circuit. After the dangerous accident in the previous year's race when a car had crashed into the busy pits, protective barriers were put in front of each pit, although the pit-lane itself was still exposed. Otherwise the only significant change was that the fuel tank on cars with an engine bigger than 5.0 litres was increased to 160 litres (35 gallons). There were slight tweaks to the calculation of the two Indices and the minimum engine size was set at 1000cc.

== Entries ==
The ACO received 89 entries but after the selection process, withdrawals and no-shows there were 51 cars at the start. The proposed entry list comprised:

Category	Classes	Prototype Entries	GT Entries	Total Entries
Large-engines	5.0+, 5.0, 4.0, 3.0L	20 (+1 reserve)	8	28
Medium-engines	2.5, 2.0, 1.6L	8	8 (+3 reserves)	16
Small-engines	1.3, 1.15, 1.0L	7 (+1 reserve)	4 (+1 reserve)	11
Total Cars		35 (+2 reserves)	20 (+4 reserves)	55

This year there was a renewed interest from the manufacturers and their works teams with 42 works-supported entries amongst the starters.

After a slow start to the season, Ferrari introduced the new Ferrari 275 P2 design from Mauro Forghieri at the April test weekend, and the following 1000 km Monza race. A range of V12 engines were fitted: The works team had two 4.0-litre 410 bhp open-top cars for F1 world champion John Surtees and former winner Ludovico Scarfiotti, and sports-car specialists Mike Parkes and Jean Guichet. They also ran a 3.3-litre 350 bhp closed-top coupé for Bandini/Biscaldi. Ferrari's regular customer teams, the British Maranello Concessionaires ran a 4.4-litre variant for Jo Bonnier/David Piper. The North American Racing Team (NART) ran a 365 P2 built around a previous year's P chassis with updated aerodynamics and featured a 4.4 L SOHC V12. It was given to NART regular Pedro Rodriguez with Nino Vaccarella.

Enzo Ferrari was furious when the CSAI, the Italian motor-racing body, would not assist to Group 3 (motorsport) GT-homologate his too small series of Ferrari 250 LM and vowed to pull his SEFAC Ferrari works team out of the GT Championship. Meanwhile, there were five 250 LM entered again as prototypes by the customer teams. This included NART (Masten Gregory/Jochen Rindt), Maranello Concessionaires (Bianchi/Salmon), Ecurie Francorchamps, Scuderia Filipinetti and Pierre Dumay's private entry. Finally, Ferrari also entered a new Dino prototype, the 166 P, with a 1.6-litre V6 engine used in 1966 in the Ferrari Dino 166 F2.

After the departure of Eric Broadley and Lola Cars, Ford put its racing organisation under Shelby American, with car production and development handled by Kar Kraft in the US and Ford Advanced Vehicles in the UK (run by John Wyer with a number of ex-Aston Martin staff). After no wins in the 1964 season, the new year had started with a win for Ford at Daytona. The new Mk II (also known as the “X-car”) was sent from FAV across to Kar Kraft to get the new engine fitted – the massive 7-litre, 450 bhp, NASCAR racing engine based on a Ford Galaxie block. Ready just in time for Le Mans, two cars would be raced by Phil Hill/Chris Amon and Ken Miles/Bruce McLaren. Meanwhile, FAV was tasked with production of the requisite 50 GT40s for homologation. On Shelby's initiative, the GT40s were now fitted with the same 380 bhp 4.7-litre engine as the Cobras (except for the Filipinetti entry) and the Colotti gearbox that proved unreliable was replaced by the more robust German-made ZF gearbox. Four cars came to Le Mans: FAV used Alan Mann Racing with Innes Ireland / John Whitmore. Shelby American supported the Rob Walker Racing Team (Maglioli/Bondurant) and the Swiss Scuderia Filipinetti (Müller/Bucknum) who were both also entering Ferraris. Ford France ran an open-top spyder variant for Maurice Trintignant/Guy Ligier

Once again Maserati France's John Simone commissioned the company to develop a new car for racing. The Tipo 65 was built in only 7 weeks, with a mid-mounted 5-litre engine in a ‘birdcage’ frame. Replacing the destroyed Tipo 59, it left no time to test before the race for its drivers Jo Siffert and Jochen Neerpasch The final big-engine entry was the returning Iso Grifo A3C. Originally there were to be three but two cars had been wrecked earlier in the year at Sebring.

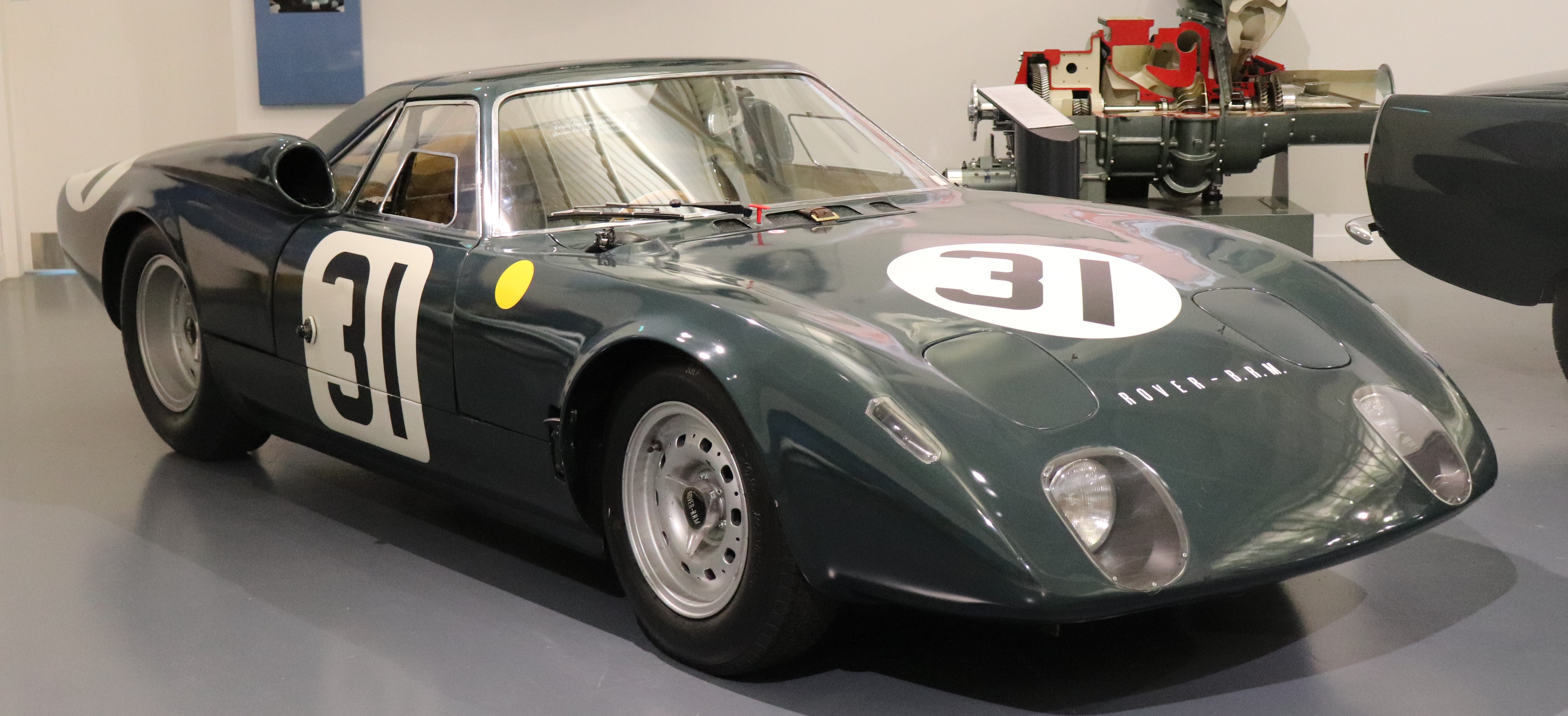
The Rover-BRM turbine car of Hill/Stewart. It finished 10th overall.

Porsche had got their desired new 185 bhp Porsche flat-six engine fitted for the prototype versions of the 904 GTS cars, alongside the Porsche flat-eight (225 bhp), with three works cars entered and a spare. Opposing them were two British cars – a privately entered Elva and the return of the Rover turbine, first seen in the 1963 race, now categorised as equivalent to 1992cc. It had a new coupé body and ceramic rotary generators as heat exchangers which halved its fuel consumption. It would be driven by F1 drivers Graham Hill and Jackie Stewart

Curiously, in the small-engine categories, Alpine was the only French manufacturer present. A new model, the M65 had aerodynamic tailfins and a new 1.3-litre Gordini engine that developed 135 bhp pushing it to 250 kp/h (155 mph). It was given to Mauro Bianchi/Henri Grandsire. The other four works cars were a mix of engines and body styles. Their opposition were a pair of the latest Sebring Sprites from Austin Healey. Fitted with the 1293cc engine in the Mini-Cooper S they could reach 240 kp/h (148 mph)

In the GT classes Ferrari were now the underdog after being beaten by the Shelby Cobras the previous year, and the races since. Five of the six Shelbys that had been made were at Le Mans, prepared by Alan Mann Racing: two for Shelby American, and one each for Ford France, Scuderia Filipinetti and AC Cars themselves. For his part, after his fit of pique, Ferrari homologated his new road-car the 275 GTB. The racing version had the 3.3-litre V12 engine extended to 300 bhp and lightened with magnesium castings. After protests from Carroll Shelby were upheld for being significantly lighter than the production car – 1100 kg - ballast had to be added. Cars were being prepared for Ecurie Francorchamps and Scuderia Sant Ambroeus.

In the smaller GT classes were the 2-litre Porsche 904s with the homologated 4-cylinder engine. Autodelta, Alfa Romeo's racing division, brought the Giulia TZ2 rebodied by Zagato. With its 1.6-litre engine tuned to 170 bhp it could 245 kp/h (152 mph). Finally there was the newly homologated Triumph Spitfire. The factory brought four cars to the race.

== Practice ==
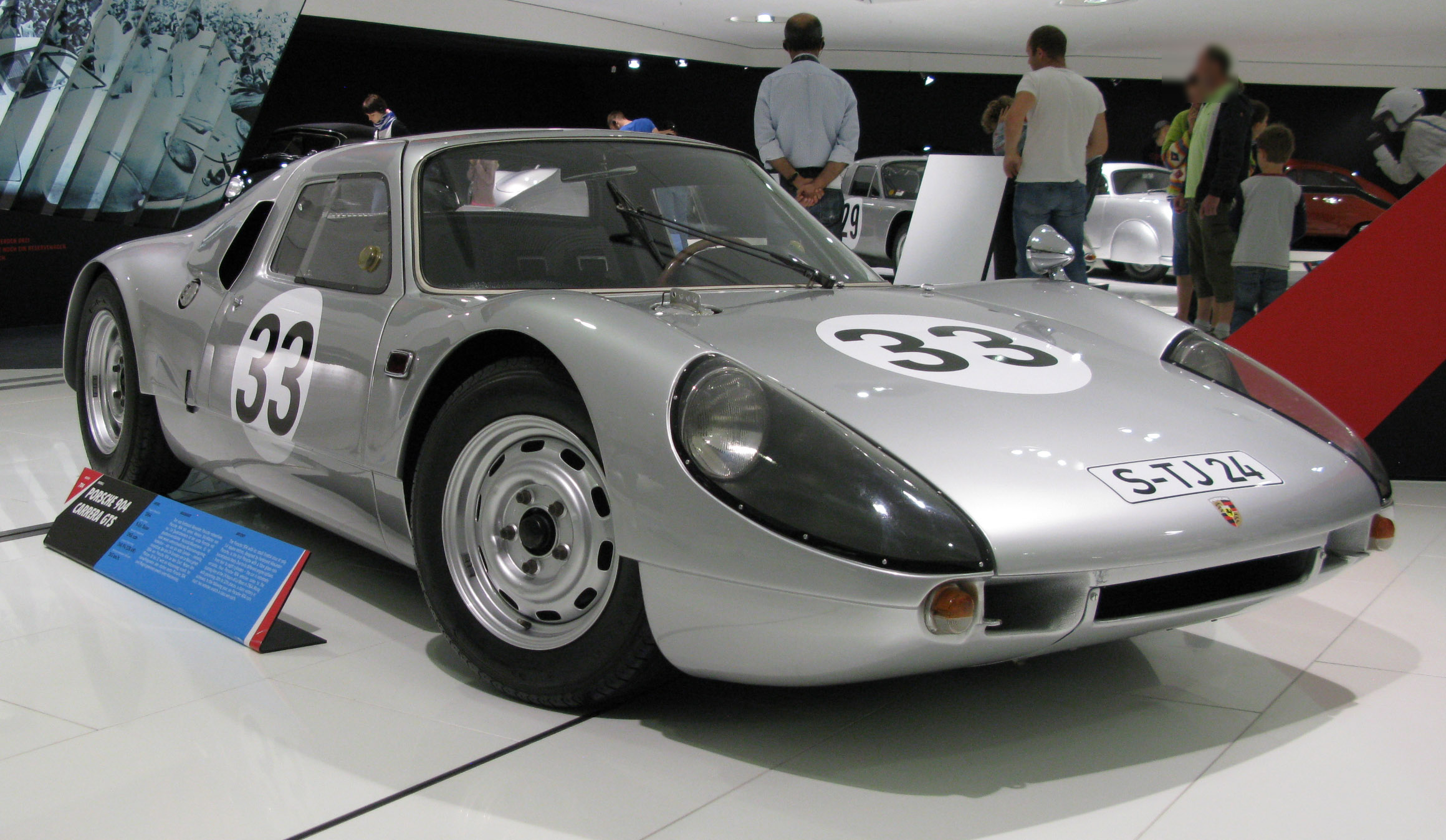
Porsche 904 of Mitter/Davis, which was the fastest Porsche during practice but retired from the race due to clutch failure.

Fastest car at the April test-weekend was brand new 330 P2 – John Surtees putting in a lap of 3:35, fully five seconds quicker than the Fords and other Ferraris. However the weekend was overshadowed by the death of Lloyd Casner in the rain on the Saturday. Casner, with his Camoradi team, was a long-time Maserati campaigner. Braking at the end of the Mulsanne straight, his Tipo 151/3 speared off the track and rolled, possibly when braking on the slick white-paint road markings. Casner was thrown from the car and died later from head injuries in hospital.

For the first time in the race's history the initial practice session on race week had to be cancelled. A severe storm felled trees and flooded parts of the circuit. The ACO rescheduled an extra session on the Saturday instead. Phil Hill, in the big 7-litre Ford, put in a blistering fastest lap of 3:33, fully 30 seconds faster than the best practice lap from only four years earlier. Surtees was second fastest, two seconds slower, in the rival Ferrari ahead of Bondurant's and Miles’ Fords. Dan Gurney had the quickest GT car – his Shelby Cobra was 12th with a 3:51.3, just ahead of the 3:55.0 of Willy Mairesse in the Belgian Ferrari GTB. In the next days, additional stabilising fins were added to the two GT40Xs.

The fastest Porsche was the flat-8 of Gerhard Mitter who put in a 3:59.4 to qualify 18th ahead of the other Cobras and the Maserati. Mauro Bianchi, in the new Alpine, was quickest of the small cars coming in 35th with a 4:20.0. In the end only 51 cars took the start when the small 1-litre Abarth failed to qualify.

== Race ==
=== Start ===
After a wet week, race-day was sunny and hot with a huge crowd. It was also the first time the American audience had live coverage of the race. Although having set fastest time, Chris Amon took the start and Phil Hill was the TV guest. As it was, when the live-feed failed Hill took over commentating duties.

Siffert got his Maserati away first, followed by the three Fords of Amon, Bondurant and McLaren. Last away was Colin Davis whose Porsche prototype refused to start for two minutes. The two New Zealanders, McLaren and Amon, led the first lap with Surtees up to third as the Maserati fell back. On the fourth lap Siffert planted the Maserati into the haybales at Tertre Rouge. When he finally got back to the pits the car was retired with damage to the oil tank and suspension. It was an underwhelming end to Maserati's presence at Le Mans. But his was not the first retirement: the Dino was gone. Baghetti had over-revved the engine terminally damaging it. Teodoro Zeccoli put his Alfa Romeo in the sandtrap at Mulsanne. He excited the spectators by stripping to his underwear in a long, unsuccessful attempt to dig it out.

Back at the front, McLaren and then Amon set about building a lead on the Ferraris, setting new lap records. After two hours only the top four cars were now on the lead lap with Miles ahead of the Ferraris of Scarfiotti, Bonnier and Parkes. But going into the third hour it all started going wrong for Ford. Hill had already fallen away with clutch problems costing 40 minutes in the pits and the French Ford had broken its gearbox when Trintignant had missed a gearchange. The Filipinetti and Walker cars went out with blown head gaskets on the same lap, and when the McLaren/Miles car broke its gearbox the Ford challenge was beaten in only three hours. Small consolation was Phil Hill's new lap record of 3:37.5 as he vainly attempted to make up the 10 laps of lost time.

This now left the race to Ferrari – the three works cars battled for the lead with the Maranello car of Bonnier/Piper. Fifth was the Gurney/Grant Cobra. Both the leading Porsche, of Mitter/Davis, and Alpine of Bianchi/Grandsire were out within three hours – with clutch and gearbox problems respectively. In the fourth hour, Gregory brought the NART Ferrari into the pits misfiring. However, after changing the distributor, losing 30 minutes, the car was ready again. Gregory found Rindt changed and ready to leave. With nothing to lose they agreed to push flat-out, rejoining in 18th.

=== Night ===
As the sun was setting came the only major accident of the race. Dutchman Rob Slotemaker went off at the fast Maison Blanche corner but was unhurt. His Triumph Spitfire was the same car that had careered towards the pits in the previous year's race when Mike Rothschild had been overcome by exhaust fumes.

After seeing off the Fords, the Ferraris also started having problems. First to fall was the Maranello car. An exhaust broke and Bonnier, choking from the fumes, bought the car in from third to retire as night fell. The gearbox of Parkes/Guichet got jammed in fifth gear. During the night, all of the P2s got delayed by cracks in their brake discs, which in turn gave problems in suspension, each losing 30–60 minutes or more in getting the issues fixed.

The Cobras had been running very well – at 2am the two Shelby-entered cars were running 4th and 5th, Johnson ahead of Gurney. But the head-gasket problem in the Fords also affected two of the Cobra engines including Johnson's. The French entry had been afflicted with clutch issues. Coming up to half-time, the Gurney/Grant car's motor mounts began to crack and the strain of the engine vibration eventually broke the crankshaft.

As the leaders were having troubles, the 250 LMs kept running reliably. By halfway, the surprise leader was the French privateer Pierre Dumay chased hard by the NART car of Gregory/Rindt (catching them by at least 5 seconds a lap after the earlier delay) and the Ecurie Francorchamps GTB of “Beurlys”/Mairesse. Parkes and Guichet had charged back to fourth ahead of the Porsches of Klass/Glemser and Linge/Nöcker. There were only 27 cars left running.

=== Morning ===
Soon before 8am the Alpine of previous class-winner Roger Delageneste and veteran Jean Vinatier was retired with ignition problems when comfortably leading the class and running 16th overall. This had just followed the loss of the smallest car in the field, the fellow works Alpine M63B that had been leading the Thermal Index, when it was stopped by a broken conrod.

At 8am, Gosselin had completed 232 laps, with Parkes and Rindt just a lap behind. Mairesse was fourth 3 laps further back with Nöcker in fifth (223 laps), Surtees (221) Vaccarella (220) then Koch, Spoerry and Pon all on 217 laps rounding out the top-10. Against the odds, the privateers held the lead for ten hours until just after midday. A tyre blowout at speed on the Mulsanne Straight did severe damage to the rear bodywork. Dumay got the car back to pits but crucial time was lost with the panelbeating. By the time they rejoined, Rindt and Gregory had a five-lap lead.

With less than three hours to go the little Austin-Healey Sprite of Rauno Aaltonen and Clive Baker, which was looking good for the two Index prizes after the demise of the Alpines, broke its gearbox. Soon after the weakened transmission of the Parkes/Guichet P2 also finally gave out, with them having fallen to fifth. After their hard charging, the leaders were also nursing a failing transmission. Gregory, in his last stint, was letting the clutch out in corners to coast through them.

=== Finish and post-race ===
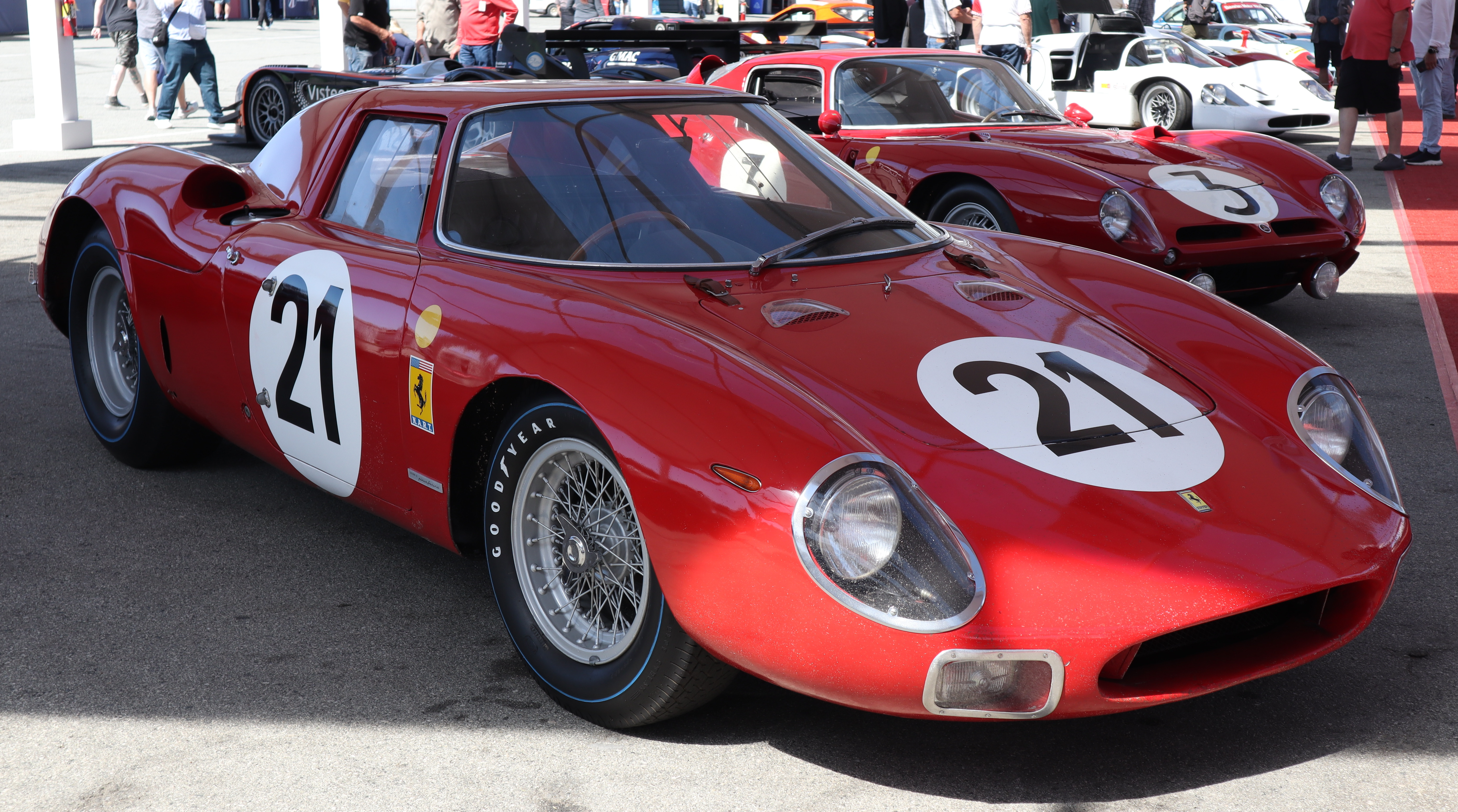
The winning Ferrari 250 LM of Gregory and Rindt

In the end, despite the fragile differential, the NART car cruised to victory. It packed up completely on the slow-down lap back to the paddock. They kept their five-lap lead over the Dumay/Gosselin car. Three laps further back, and first GT, was Mairesse and “Beurlys” in the Ecurie Francorchamps Ferrari GTB.

Fourth was the works Porsche of Herbert Linge and Peter Nöcker. Their trouble-free run also netted them the Index of Performance prize ahead of the winning Ferrari. In fifth was their GT stablemate of Gerd Koch / Toni Fischhaber, who in turn won the Index of Thermal Efficiency, despite having to be pushed over the line.

After losing nearly two hours replacing their clutch in the middle of the night, the NART Ferrari of Rodriguez/Vaccarella was the only P2 to finish, coming in 7th, 28 laps behind the winner. The only Ford-engined car to finish was the Sears/Thompson works Cobra in 8th. After a collision with an Alfa Romeo around midnight while running 5th, they had nursed their battered car with oil-pressure issues to the end over 30 laps behind the GT-winning Ferrari.

Tenth, and first British car home, was the Rover-BRM turbine. It covered a lesser distance than in 1963, as an early off by Hill had sucked sand into the engine causing constant overheating issues. It was a notable experiment, however the issues with fuel consumption and heat management meant the project was impractical for road application and was subsequently cancelled. In a race of attrition there were only fourteen finishers, with British cars filled the final five places including two class wins. These included rally specialists Simo Lampinen and Jean-Jacques Thuner for Triumph's final appearance. It was also the final appearance for MG for 40 years. Paddy Hopkirk and Andrew Hedges once again had a low-maintenance reliable race with a consecutive race finish. Surprisingly, for the first time ever, not a single French car finished the race.

So another debacle for Ford, with only one of the eleven Ford-engined cars finishing. A silver lining was, with a class win the next month at Reims, the Cobra-Ford clinched the GT Championship. Later in the year Ferrari, indeed, sold a portion of his company, not to Ford, but to FIAT.

==== Hugus claim ====
Ed Hugus, the reserve driver, declared many years later that he actually drove a whole shift in the winning car. Just before dawn, Gregory had pitted unexpectedly exhausted and his glasses-vision impaired by the pre-dawn mist. Hugus' story was that Rindt was sleeping somewhere and could not be found, so Hugus took over driving duties for a few hours. This was controversial because - according to the regulations - Gregory would not have been allowed to drive again once Hugus replaced him (which he actually did) and the car should have been disqualified. However, no one recorded it, and Hugus was never officially credited with co-driving duties. Hugus, either from discretion or that he could not get through the crowd to the podium, never made public claims on this story, which was only revealed in late 2000s. After his death, one of his fans made public a letter written to him by the driver giving all the details.However, neither the official timing figures nor eye-witness accounts match up with Hugus' claims.

== Official results ==
=== Finishers ===
Results taken from Quentin Spurring's book, officially licensed by the ACO Class Winners are in Bold text.

Pos	Class	No	Team	Drivers	Chassis	Engine	Laps
1	P 4.0	**21**	(United States) **North American Racing Team**	(United States) **Masten Gregory** (Austria) **Jochen Rindt**	Ferrari 250 LM	Ferrari 3.3L V12	348
2	P 4.0	26	(France) P. Dumay (private entrant)	(France) Pierre Dumay (Belgium) Gustave ‘Taf’ Gosselin	Ferrari 250 LM	Ferrari 3.3L V12	343
3	GT; 4.0	**24**	(Belgium) **Ecurie Francorchamps**	(Belgium) **Willy Mairesse** (Belgium) **“Beurlys” (Jean Blaton)**	Ferrari 275 GTB	Ferrari 3.3L V12	340
4	P 2.0	**32**	(Germany) **Porsche System Engineering**	(Germany) **Herbert Linge** (Germany) **Peter Nöcker**	Porsche 904/6	Porsche 1968cc F6	336
5	GT; 2.0	**36**	(Germany) **Porsche System Engineering**	(Germany) **Gerhard ‘Gerd’ Koch** (Germany) **Anton ‘Toni’ Fischhaber**	Porsche 904/4 GTS	Porsche 1968cc F4	325
6	P 4.0	27	(Switzerland) Scuderia Filipinetti	(Switzerland) Dieter Spoerry (Switzerland) Armand Boller	Ferrari 250 LM	Ferrari 3.3L V12	324
7	P 5.0	**18**	(United States) **North American Racing Team**	(Mexico) **Pedro Rodríguez** (Italy) **Nino Vaccarella**	Ferrari 365 P2 Spyder	Ferrari 4.4L V12	320
8	GT; 5.0	**11**	(United Kingdom) **AC Cars Ltd.**	(United Kingdom) **Jack Sears** (United States) **Dick Thompson**	AC Cobra Daytona Coupé	Ford 4.7L V8	304
9	P +5.0	**3**	(Italy) **Iso Grifo Prototipi Bizzarrini**	(France) **Régis Fraissinet** (France) **Jean de Mortemart**	Iso Grifo A3C	Chevrolet 5.4L V8	303
10	P 2.0	31	(United Kingdom) Owen Racing Organisation	(United Kingdom) Graham Hill (United Kingdom) Jackie Stewart	Rover-BRM	Rover 1992cc Turbine	284
11	GT; 2.0	39	(United Kingdom) British Motor Corporation	(United Kingdom) Paddy Hopkirk (United Kingdom) Andrew Hedges	MG MGB Hardtop	MG 1801cc S4	283
12	P 1.3	**49**	(United Kingdom) **Donald Healey Motor Company**	(Australia) **Paul Hawkins** (United Kingdom) **John Rhodes**	Austin-Healey Sebring Sprite	BMC 1293cc S4	278
13	GT; 1.15	**60** (reserve)	(United Kingdom) **Standard-Triumph Ltd.**	(Switzerland) **Jean-Jacques Thuner** (Finland) **Simo Lampinen**	Triumph Spitfire	Triumph 1147cc S4	274
14	GT; 1.15	54	(United Kingdom) Standard-Triumph Ltd.	(Belgium) Claude Dubois (France) Jean-François Piot	Triumph Spitfire	Triumph 1147cc S4	263

=== Did Not Finish ===
Pos	Class	No	Team	Drivers	Chassis	Engine	Laps	Reason
DNF	P 4.0	20	(Italy) SpA Ferrari SEFAC	(United Kingdom) Mike Parkes (France) Jean Guichet	Ferrari 330 P2 Spyder	Ferrari 4.0L V12	315	Gearbox (23hr)
DNF	P 1.3	48	(United Kingdom) Donald Healey Motor Company	(Finland) Rauno Aaltonen (United Kingdom) Clive Baker	Austin-Healey Sebring Sprite	BMC 1293cc S4	256	Gearbox (22hr)
DNF	P 4.0	19	(Italy) SpA Ferrari SEFAC	(United Kingdom) John Surtees (Italy) Ludovico Scarfiotti	Ferrari 330 P2 Spyder	Ferrari 4.0L V12	225	Gearbox (18hr)
DNF	GT; 2.0	37	(France) A. Veuillet (private entrant)	(France) Robert Buchet (Netherlands) Ben Pon	Porsche 904/4 GTS	Porsche 1968cc F4	224	Oil leak (17hr)
DNF	P 4.0	22	(Italy) SpA Ferrari SEFAC	(Italy) Lorenzo Bandini (Italy) Giampiero Biscaldi	Ferrari 275 P2	Ferrari 3.3L V12	221	Valves (17hr)
DNF	GT; 1.6	44	(Luxembourg) Equipe Grand Ducale; Luxembourgeoise	(Luxembourg) Nicholas Koob (France) Alain Finkelstein	Alfa Romeo Giulia TZ2	Alfa Romeo 1570cc S4	218	Engine (19hr)
DNF	GT; 1.6	41	(Italy) Autodelta SpA	(Italy) Roberto Bussinello (France) Jean Rolland	Alfa Romeo Giulia TZ2	Alfa Romeo 1570cc S4	217	Engine (18hr)
DNF	GT; 5.0	9	(United States) Shelby-American Inc.	(United States) Dan Gurney (United States) Jerry Grant	AC Cobra Daytona Coupé	Ford 4.7L V8	204	Crankshaft (16hr)
DNF	P 2.0	35	(Germany) Porsche System Engineering	(Germany) Günter Klass (Germany) Dieter Glemser	Porsche 904/6	Porsche 1991cc F6	202	Camshaft (16hr)
DNF	P 1.3	47	(France) Société Automobiles; Alpine	(France) Roger Delageneste (France) Jean Vinatier	Alpine A110 M64	Renault-Gordini 1296cc S4	196	Ignition (16hr)
DNF	GT; 1.3	55	(France) Société Automobiles; Alpine	(France) Jacques Cheinisse (France) Jean-Pierre Hanrioud	Alpine A110 GT4	Renault-Gordini 1108cc S4	196	Clutch (21hr)
DNF	P 1.15	61 (reserve)	(France) Société Automobiles; Alpine	(France) Robert Bouharde (France) Pierre Monneret	Alpine A110 M63B	Renault-Gordini 1002cc S4	187	Ignition (16hr)
DNF	GT; 5.0	10	(United States) Shelby-American Inc.	(United States) Bob Johnson (United States) Tom Payne	AC Cobra Daytona Coupé	Ford 4.7L V8	158	Head gasket (12hr)
DSQ	P 1.15	51	(France) Société Automobiles; Alpine	(France) Roger Masson (France) Guy Verrier	Alpine A110 M64	Renault-Gordini 1150cc S4	148	premature water change
DNF	P 4.0	25	(Belgium) Ecurie Francorchamps	(Belgium) Gerhard Langlois van Ophem (Belgium) “Eldé” (Leon Dernier)	Ferrari 250 LM	Ferrari 3.3L V12	146	Clutch (12hr)
DNF	GT; 2.0	38	(France) J. Franc (private entrant)	(France) “Franc” (Jacques Dewes) (France) Jean Kerguen	Porsche 904/4 GTS	Porsche 1968cc F4	130	Out of fuel (10hr)
DNF	GT; 5.0	59 (reserve)	(Switzerland) Scuderia Filipinetti	(United Kingdom) Peter Sutcliffe (United Kingdom) Peter Harper	AC Cobra Daytona Coupé	Ford 4.7L V8	126	Head gasket (10hr)
DNF	P 1.15	50	(France) Société Automobiles; Alpine	(France) Philippe Vidal (United States) Peter Revson	Alpine A110 M64	Renault-Gordini 1150cc S4	116	Engine (10hr)
DNF	GT; 5.0	12	Ford France S.A.	(France) Jo Schlesser (United States) Allen Grant	AC Cobra Daytona Coupé	Ford 4.7L V8	111	Clutch (10hr)
DNF	P 5.0	17	(United Kingdom) Maranello Concessionaires Ltd.	(United Kingdom) David Piper (Sweden) Jo Bonnier	Ferrari 365 P2	Ferrari 4.4L V12	101	Ignition (9hr)
DNF	P 4.0	23	(United Kingdom) Maranello Concessionaires Ltd.	(Belgium) Lucien Bianchi (United Kingdom) Mike Salmon	Ferrari 250 LM	Ferrari 3.3L V12	99	Gearbox (8hr)
DNF	P +5.0	2	(United States) Shelby-American Inc.	(United States) Phil Hill (New Zealand) Chris Amon	Ford GT40X	Ford 7.0L V8	89	Clutch (7hr)
DNF	GT; 5.0	14	(United Kingdom) Ford Advanced Vehicles	(United Kingdom) Sir John Whitmore (United Kingdom) Innes Ireland	Ford GT40	Ford 4.7L V8	72	Head gasket (6hr)
DNF	GT; 1.15	52	(United Kingdom) Standard Triumph Ltd.	(United Kingdom) David Hobbs (Netherlands) Rob Slotemaker	Triumph Spitfire	Triumph 1147cc S4	71	Accident (7hr)
DNF	P +5.0	1	(United States) Shelby-American Inc.	(United Kingdom) Ken Miles (New Zealand) Bruce McLaren	Ford GT40X	Ford 7.0L V8	45	Gearbox (4hr)
DNF	P 1.3	46	(France) Société Automobiles; Alpine	(Belgium) Mauro Bianchi (France) Henri Grandsire	Alpine M65	Renault-Gordini 1296cc S4	32	Gearbox (3hr)
DNF	P +5.0	6	(Switzerland) Scuderia Filipinetti	(Switzerland) Herbert Müller (United States) Ronnie Bucknum	Ford GT40	Ford 5.3L V8	29	Head gasket (3hr)
DNF	P 5.0	7	(United Kingdom) Rob Walker Racing Team	(United States) Bob Bondurant (Italy) Umberto Maglioli	Ford GT40	Ford 4.7L V8	29	Head gasket (3hr)
DNF	P 2.0	30	(United Kingdom) Anglian Racing Developments	(United Kingdom) Richard Wrottesley (United Kingdom) Tony Lanfranchi	Elva GT160	BMW 1991cc S4	29	Clutch (4hr)
DNF	GT; 1.6	42	(Italy) Autodelta SpA	(Italy) “Geki” (Giacomo Russo) (Italy) Carlo Zuccoli	Alfa Romeo Giulia TZ2	Alfa Romeo 1570cc S4	22	Oil pipe (2hr)
DNF	P 2.0	33	(Germany) Porsche System Engineering	(United Kingdom) Colin Davis (Germany) Gerhard Mitter	Porsche 904/8	Porsche 1985cc F8	20	Clutch (4hr)
DNF	GT; 2.0	62 (reserve)	(France) C. Poirot (private entrant)	(France) Christian Poirot (Germany) Rolf Stommelen	Porsche 904/4 GTS	Porsche 1968cc F4	13	Gearbox (2hr)
DNF	P 5.0	15	Ford France S.A.	(France) Maurice Trintignant (France) Guy Ligier	Ford GT40 Spyder	Ford 4.7L V8	11	Gearbox (2hr)
DNF	GT; 1.3	53	(United Kingdom) Standard Triumph Ltd.	(United Kingdom) Peter Bolton (United Kingdom) Bill Bradley	Triumph Spitfire	Triumph 1147cc S4	6	Engine (1hr)
DNF	P 5.0	8	(France) J. Simone (private entrant)	(Switzerland) Jo Siffert (Germany) Jochen Neerpasch	Maserati Tipo 65	Maserati 5.0L V8	3	Accident damage (1hr)
DNF	P 1.6	40	(Italy) SpA Dino SEFAC	(Italy) Giancarlo Baghetti (Italy) Mario Casoni	Dino 166 P	Ferrari 1593cc V6	2	Engine (1hr)
DNF	GT; 1.6	43	(Italy) Autodelta SpA	(Italy) Teodoro Zeccoli (France) José Rosinski	Alfa Romeo Giulia TZ2	Alfa Romeo 1570cc S4	1	Accident (2hr)

=== Did Not Practice ===
Pos	Class	No	Team	Drivers	Chassis	Engine	Reason
DNQ	P 1.15	56	Abarth France	(France) Claude Ballot-Léna (France) Franck Ruata	Abarth 1000 SP	Fiat 998cc S4	Did not qualify
DNA	P +5.0	4	(Italy) Iso Grifo Prototipi Bizzarrini	(Belgium) Pierre Noblet (Switzerland) Edgar Berney	Iso Grifo A3C	Chevrolet 5.4L V8	Did not arrive
DNA	P +5.0	5	(Italy) Iso Grifo Prototipi Bizzarrini	(Switzerland) Silvio Moser (Portugal) Mario Cabral	Iso Grifo A3C	Chevrolet 5.4L V8	Did not arrive
DNA	GT; 5.0	16	(United Kingdom) John Willment Automobiles	(Australia) Frank Gardner (United Kingdom) Alan Rees	AC Cobra Daytona Coupé	Ford 4.7L V8	Did not arrive
DNA	P 2.0	34	(Germany) Porsche System Engineering		Porsche 904/6	Porsche 1991cc F6	Did not arrive
DNA	P 1.6	45	(France) Société d’Etudes & Construction	(France) Alain Bertaut (France) André Guilhaudin	CD 3	Alfa Romeo 1570cc S4	Did not arrive
DNP	GT; 4.0	57 (reserve)	(United States) North American Racing Team		Ferrari 275 GTB	Ferrari 3.3L V12	Not required
DNP	P 4.0	63 (reserve)	(Belgium) Ecurie Francorchamps		Ferrari 250 LM	Ferrari 3.3L V12	Not required
DNP	GT; 2.0	66 (reserve)	(Switzerland) Scuderia Filipinetti	(Switzerland) Dieter Spoerry (Switzerland) Jacques Calderari	Porsche 904/4 GTS	Porsche 1968cc F4	Not required
DNP	GT; 1.6	69 (reserve)	(France) C. Laurent (private entrant)	(France) Claude Laurent (France) Pierre Gelé	Lotus Elan	Lotus 1598cc S4	Not required

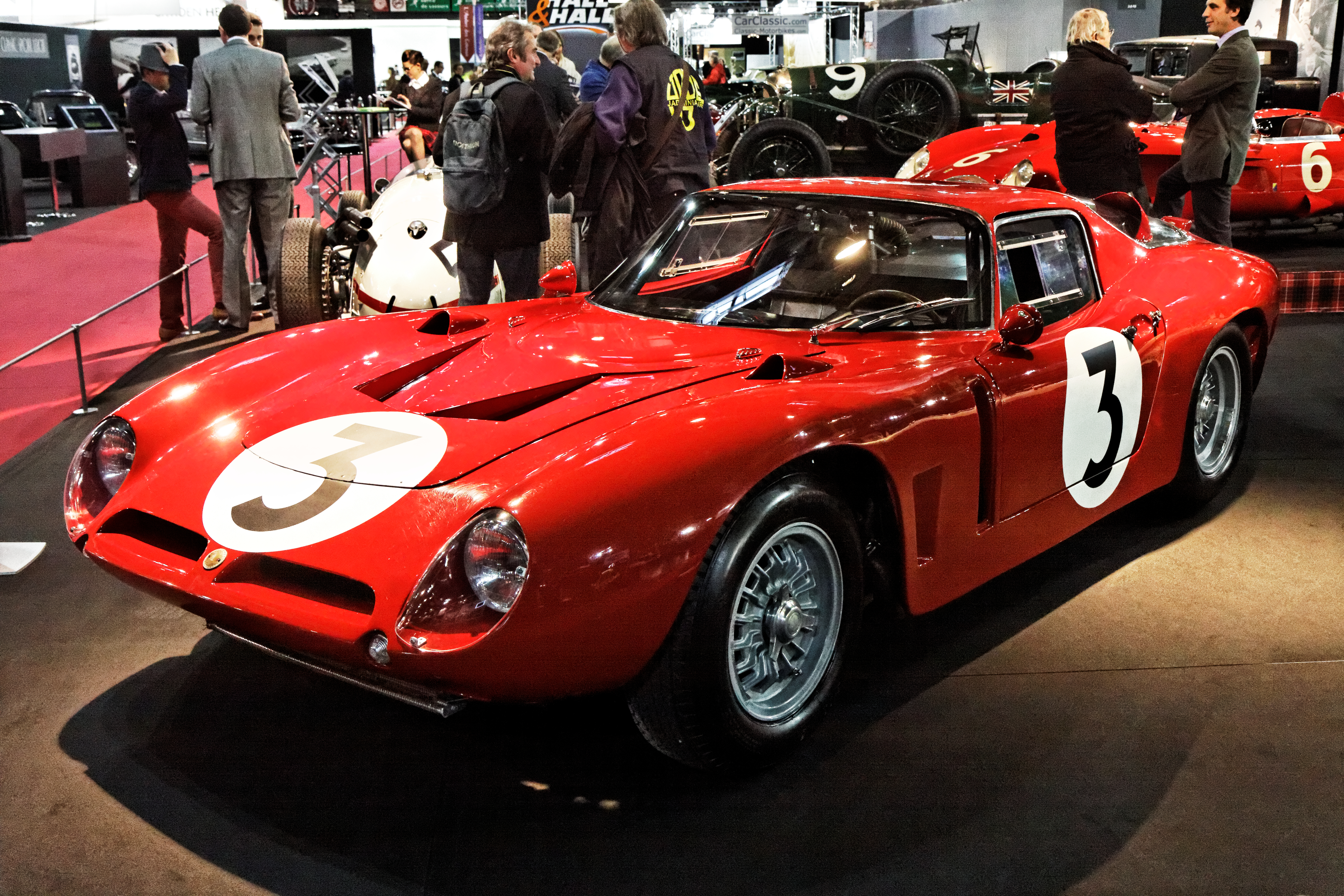
The Iso Grifo A3C of Fraissinet/de Mortemart, which won the Prototype > 5000cc class.

=== Class Winners ===
Class	Prototype Winners		Class	GT Winners	
Prototype >5000	#3 Iso Grifo A3C	Fraissinet / de Mortemart	Grand Touring >5000	no entrants	
Prototype 5000	#18 Ferrari 365 P2 Spyder	Rodriguez / Vaccarella	Grand Touring 5000	#11 AC Cobra Daytona Coupé	Sears / Thompson
Prototype 4000	#21 Ferrari 250 LM	Gregory / Rindt	Grand Touring 4000	#24 Ferrari 275 GTB	Mairesse / “Beurlys”
Prototype 3000	no entrants		Grand Touring 3000	no entrants	
Prototype 2500	no entrants		Grand Touring 2500	no entrants	
Prototype 2000	#32 Porsche 904/6	Linge / Nöcker *	Grand Touring 2000	#36 Porsche 904/4 GTS	Koch / Fischhaber
Prototype 1600	no finishers		Grand Touring 1600	no finishers	
Prototype 1300	#49 Austin-Healey Sebring Sprite	Hawkins / Rhodes	Grand Touring 1300	no entrants	
Prototype 1150	no finishers		Grand Touring 1150	#60 Triumph Spitfire	Thuner / Lampinen

- Note: setting a new Distance Record.

=== Index of Thermal Efficiency ===
Pos	Class	No	Team	Drivers	Chassis	Score
1	GT; 2.0	36	(Germany) Porsche System Engineering	(Germany) Gerhard ‘Gerd’ Koch (Germany) Anton ‘Toni’ Fischhaber	Porsche 904/4 GTS	1.10
2	P 4.0	26	(France) P. Dumay (private entrant)	(France) Pierre Dumay (Belgium) Gustave ‘Taf’ Gosselin	Ferrari 250 LM	1.07
3	P 1.3	49	(United Kingdom) Donald Healey Motor Company	(Australia) Paul Hawkins (United Kingdom) John Rhodes	Austin-Healey Sebring Sprite	1.05
4	P 2.0	32	(Germany) Porsche System Engineering	(Germany) Herbert Linge (Germany) Peter Nöcker	Porsche 904/6	1.03
5=	P 4.0	21	(United States) North American Racing Team	(United States) Masten Gregory (Austria) Jochen Rindt	Ferrari 250 LM	1.00
5=	GT; 4.0	24	(Belgium) Ecurie Francorchamps	(Belgium) Willy Mairesse (Belgium) “Beurlys” (Jean Blaton)	Ferrari 275 GTB	1.00
5=	GT; 2.0	39	(United Kingdom) British Motor Corporation	(United Kingdom) Paddy Hopkirk (United Kingdom) Andrew Hedges	MG MGB Hardtop	1.00
8	P 4.0	27	(Switzerland) Scuderia Filipinetti	(Switzerland) Dieter Spoerry (Switzerland) Armand Boller	Ferrari 250 LM	0.95
9=	GT; 5.0	11	(United Kingdom) AC Cars Ltd.	(United Kingdom) Jack Sears (United States) Dick Thompson	AC Cobra Daytona Coupé	0.91
9=	P 2.0	31	(United Kingdom) Owen Racing Organisation	(United Kingdom) Graham Hill (United Kingdom) Jackie Stewart	Rover-BRM	0.91

- Note: Only the top ten positions are included in this set of standings.

=== Index of Performance ===
Taken from Moity's book.

Pos	Class	No	Team	Drivers	Chassis	Score
1	P 2.0	32	(Germany) Porsche System Engineering	(Germany) Herbert Linge (Germany) Peter Nöcker	Porsche 904/6	1.248
2	P 4.0	21	(United States) North American Racing Team	(United States) Masten Gregory (Austria) Jochen Rindt	Ferrari 250 LM	1.220
3	GT; 2.0	36	(Germany) Porsche System Engineering	(Germany) Gerhard ‘Gerd’ Koch (Germany) Anton ‘Toni’ Fischhaber	Porsche 904/4 GTS	1.211
4	P 4.0	26	(France) P. Dumay (private entrant)	(France) Pierre Dumay (Belgium) Gustave ‘Taf’ Gosselin	Ferrari 250 LM	1.201
5	GT; 4.0	24	(Belgium) Ecurie Francorchamps	(Belgium) Willy Mairesse (Belgium) “Beurlys” (Jean Blaton)	Ferrari 275 GTB	1.190
6	P 4.0	27	(Switzerland) Scuderia Filipinetti	(Switzerland) Dieter Spoerry (Switzerland) Armand Boller	Ferrari 250 LM	1.136
7	P 1.3	49	(United Kingdom) Donald Healey Motor Company	(Australia) Paul Hawkins (United Kingdom) John Rhodes	Austin-Healey Sebring Sprite	1.120
8	P 5.0	18	(United States) North American Racing Team	(Mexico) Pedro Rodriguez (Italy) Nino Vaccarella	Ferrari 365 P2 Spyder	1.096
9	GT; 2.0	39	(United Kingdom) British Motor Corporation	(United Kingdom) Paddy Hopkirk (United Kingdom) Andrew Hedges	MG MGB Hardtop	1.068
10	P 2.0	31	(United Kingdom) Owen Racing Organisation	(United Kingdom) Graham Hill (United Kingdom) Jackie Stewart	Rover-BRM	1.056

- Note: Only the top ten positions are included in this set of standings. A score of 1.00 means meeting the minimum distance for the car, and a higher score is exceeding the nominal target distance.

=== Statistics ===
Taken from Quentin Spurring's book, officially licensed by the ACO

- Fastest Lap in practice – P.Hill, #2 Ford GT40X – 3:33.0secs; 227.51 km/h (141.37 mph)
- Fastest Lap – P.Hill, #2 Ford GT40X – 3:37.5secs; 222.80 km/h (138.44 mph)
- Distance – 4,677.11 km (2,906.22 mi)
- Winner's Average Speed – 194.88 km/h (121.09 mph)
- Attendance – 300 000+

=== Challenge Mondial de Vitesse et Endurance Standings ===
As calculated after Le Mans, Round 8 of 9, with the best 6 results counting (full score in brackets)

Pos	Manufacturer	Points
1	(Italy) Ferrari	49 (53)
2	(West Germany) Porsche	22 (24)
3	(United States) Ford	19
4	(United Kingdom) AC-Ford	14
5=	(United States) Chaparrel	9
5=	(Australia) Brabham	9
7	(United Kingdom) Lola	6
8	(Italy) iso	2
9	(Italy) Abarth	1

Citations
