= 1964 Trophées d'Auvergne =

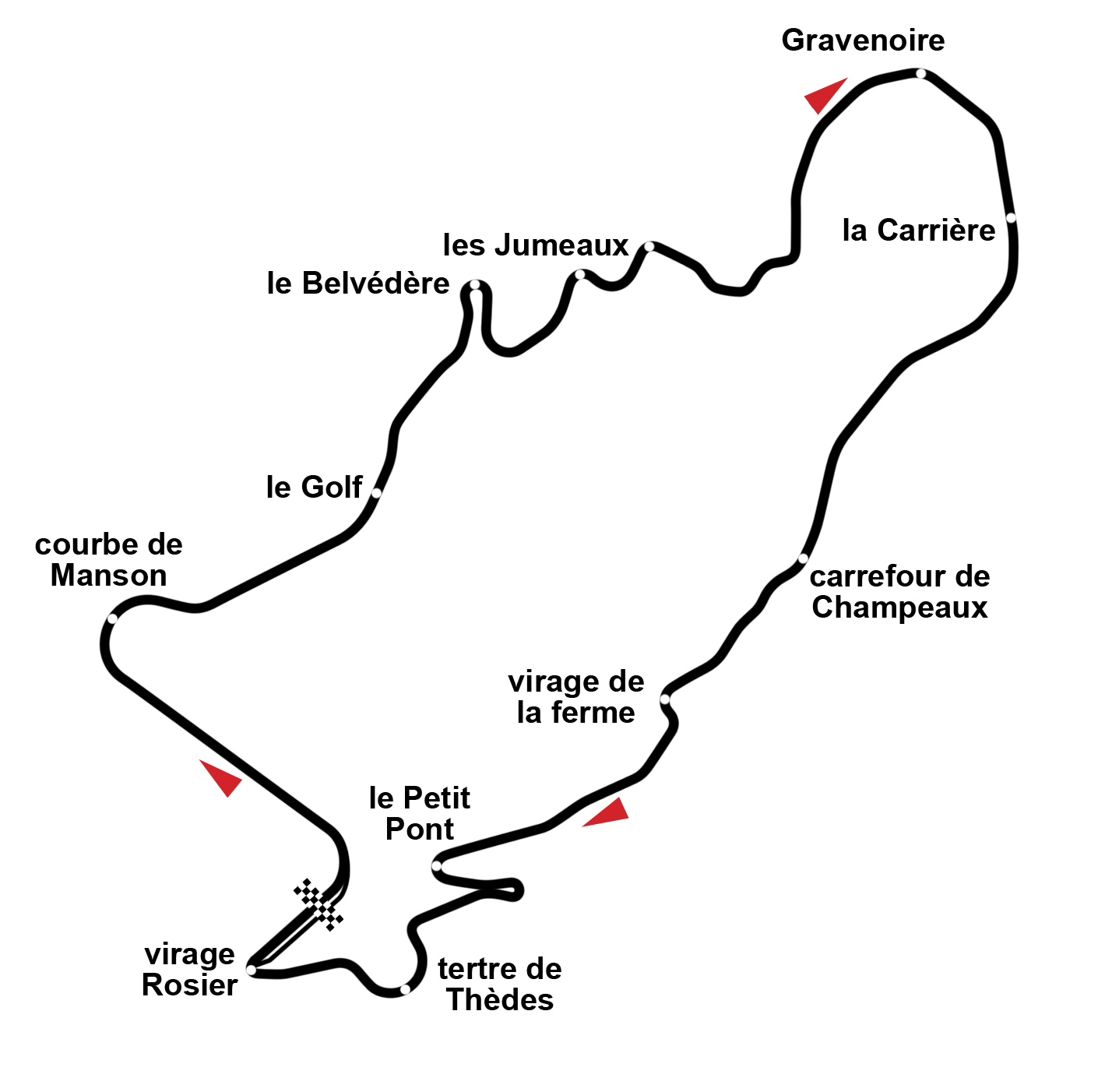
Circuit de Charade (1958–1988)

The fifth Trophée d’Auvergne, was the fourth round of the 1964 FFSA Trophées de France. This was held on the Circuit de Charade, in the Auvergne mountains, near the town of Clermont-Ferrand, on 19 July. This Formula Two race podium was a sign of things to come: Denny Hulme, Jackie Stewart and Jochen Rindt showed their skill before the track hosted the 1965 French Grand Prix.

== Report ==
=== Entry ===
A total of 30 F2 cars were entered for the event, of which 22 took part in qualifying.

=== Qualifying ===
Denny Hulme took pole position for the Brabham Racing Developments team, in a Brabham-Cosworth BT10, averaging a speed of 81.532 mph (131.213 km/h), around the five mile (8 km) course.

=== Race ===
The race was held over 32 laps of the Circuit de Charade. Denny Hulme took the winner's spoils for the works Brabham team, driving their Brabham-Cosworth BT10. Hulme won in a time of 1hr 59:11.9mins., averaging a speed of 80.618 mph (129.742 km/h). Approximately 6.6s behind was the second place car, driven by Jackie Stewart, for Ron Harris - Lotus in their Cosworth-powered Lotus 32. The podium was completed by the second Brabham of Jochen Rindt.

== Classification ==
=== Race result ===
Pos.	No.	Driver	Entrant	Car - Engine	Time, Laps	Reason Out
1st	7	(New Zealand) Denny Hulme	Brabham Racing Developments	Brabham-Cosworth BT10	1hr 59:11.9	
2nd	18	(United Kingdom) Jackie Stewart	Ron Harris - Team Lotus	Lotus-Cosworth 32	1hr 59:18.5	
3rd	5	(Austria) Jochen Rindt	Ford Motor Co (Austria)	Brabham-Cosworth BT10	2hr 00:57.5	
4th	4	(South Africa) Tony Maggs	Midland Racing Partnership	Lola-Cosworth T54	2hr 00:57.9	
5th	19	(United Kingdom) Peter Procter	Ron Harris - Team Lotus	Lotus-Cosworth 32	2hr 01:47.2	
6th	1	(United Kingdom) Alan Rees	Roy Winkelamnn Racing	Brabham-Cosworth BT10	2hr 02:47.2	
7th	16	(France) José Rosinski	Société des Automobiles Alpine	Alpine-Renault A270	31	
8th	8	(United Kingdom) Mike Beckwith	Normand Racing Team	Cooper-Cosworth T71	31	
9th	9	(France) Jacques Maglia	Jacques Maglia	Brabham-Cosworth BT10	31	
10th	17	(France) Jean Vinatier	Société des Automobiles Alpine	Alpine-Renault A270	30	
11th	24	(Belgium) Teddy Pilette	Merlyn Racing	Merlyn-Cosworth Mk 7	30	
12th	3	(United Kingdom) Bill Bradley	Midland Racing Partnership	Lola-Cosworth T54	30	
13th	6	(Australia) John Ampt	Team Alexis	Alexis-Cosworth Mk 5	30	
14th	21	(Switzerland) Jean-Claude Rudaz	Société Automobiles René Bonnet	René Bonnet-Cosworth 1	29	
15th	22	(France) Roland Charriére	Société Automobiles René Bonnet	René Bonnet-Cosworth 1	26	
16th	11	(United Kingdom) Warwick Banks	Normand Racing Team	Cooper-Cosworth T71	25	
DNF	2	(United Kingdom) Richard Attwood	Midland Racing Partnership	Lola-Cosworth T54	22	Accident
DNF	25	(Austria) Herbert Nosek	Racing Team Austria	Cooper-Lotus T65	19	
DNF	23	(France) Robert Bouharde	Société Automobiles René Bonnet	René Bonnet-Cosworth 1	16	
DNF	14	(France) Jo Schlesser	Equipe Ford France SA	Brabham-Cosworth BT6	8	
DNF	12	(Australia) Frank Garner	John Willment Automobiles	Brabham-Cosworth BT10	0	Gearbox
DNS	8	(United Kingdom) Rodney Bloor	Sports Motors (Manchester)	Lotus-Cosworth32		Accident

- Fastest lap: Richard Attwood, 3:40.9ecs. (81.569 mph)
