= Jochen Neerpasch =

German racing driver and motorsports manager

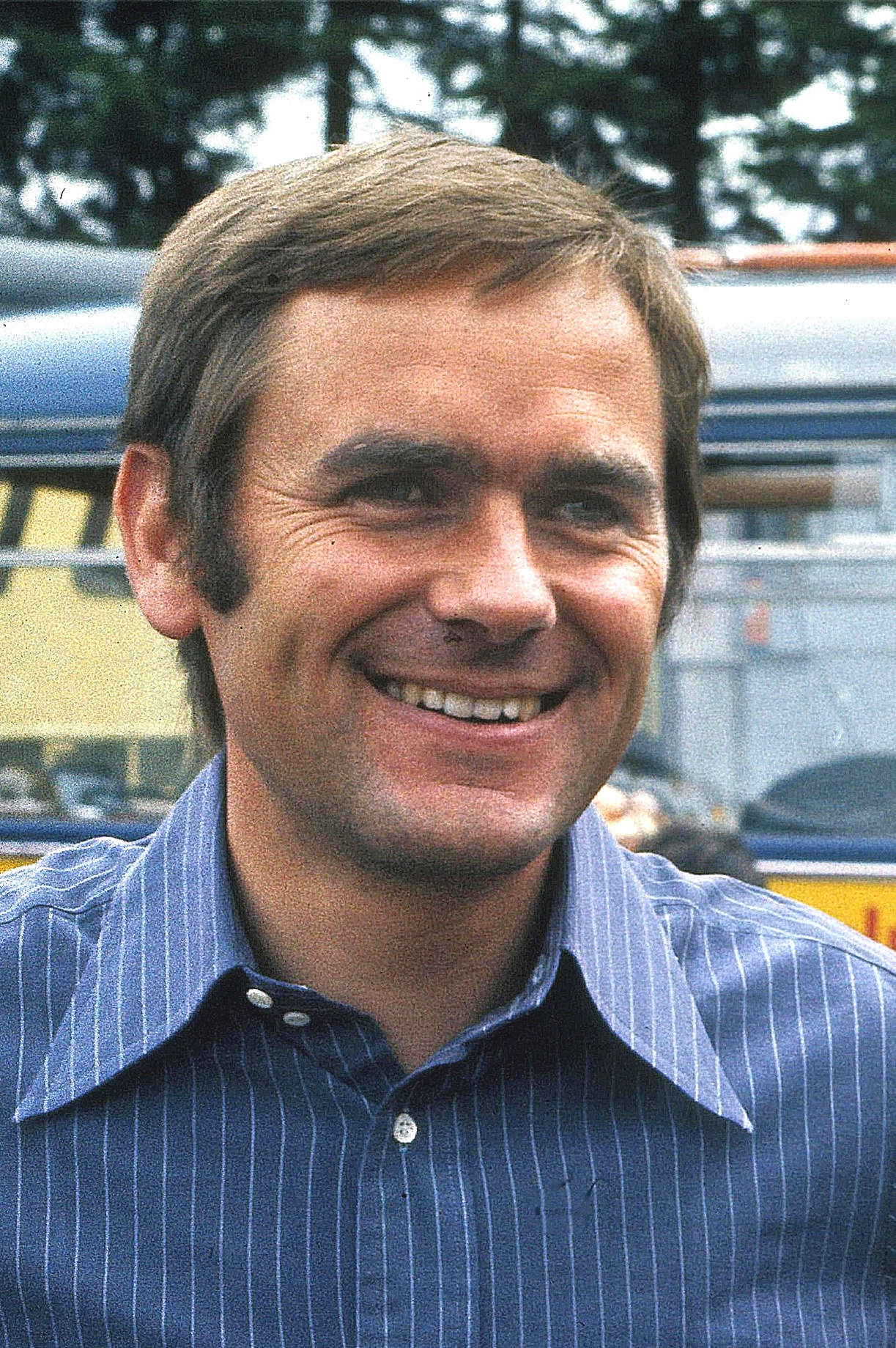
- Neerpasch in 1973
- Born: 23 March 1939 (age 87); Krefeld, Germany

24 Hours of Le Mans career
- Years: 1964 – 1968
- Teams: B. Cunningham; J. Simone; Essex Wire Corporation; Porsche System Engineering
- Best finish: 3rd (1968)
- Class wins: 0

Jochen Neerpasch (born 23 March 1939) is a German former racecar driver and motorsports manager.

== Career ==
Neerpasch's racing career began in the 1960s, first on Borgward touring car, then with the 1964 24 Hours of Le Mans as a first major event. Racing a Porsche 907, he won the 1968 24 Hours of Daytona. After his third-place finish in Le Mans the same year, he retired from racing.

In the 1970s, Neerpasch became a successful manager in the Deutsche Rennsport Meisterschaft and the European Touring Car Championship. He first managed Ford, then he took the 1972 champion Hans-Joachim Stuck with him to BMW, to found the successful BMW M team and company.

In BMW, Neerpasch also led the development of the mid-engined BMW M1, which he designed to take on Porsche in Group 5 racing. While the required 400 homologation cars were being assembled, to gain racing experience for the cars, he contacted March Engineering's head Max Mosley, who was a member of Formula One Constructors' Association, and together they created a one-make racing series BMW M1 Procar Championship, that ran in 1979 and 1980. Neerpasch himself later raced in a 2008 one-time revival of the Procar Championship, driving a M1 Procar designed by Andy Warhol.

In the 1980s, Neerpasch was in charge of Sauber-Mercedes sports car racing team, winning the 24 Hours of Le Mans in 1989. He also discovered and taught talents like Michael Schumacher, Karl Wendlinger, and Heinz-Harald Frentzen.

== Racing record ==
=== Complete 24 Hours of Le Mans results ===
Year	Team	Co-Drivers	Car	Class	Laps	Pos.	Class Pos.
1964	(United States) Briggs S. Cunningham	(New Zealand) Chris Amon	Shelby Daytona Cobra Coupe	GT +3.0	131	DSQ (Outside assistance)	
1965	(France) J. Simone (private entrant)	(Switzerland) Jo Siffert	Maserati Tipo 65	P 5.0	3	DNF (Accident damage)	
1966	(United States) Essex Wire Corporation	(Belgium) Jacky Ickx	Ford GT40	S 5.0	154	DNF (Engine)	
1967	(Germany) Porsche System Engineering	(Germany) Rolf Stommelen	Porsche 910 kurzheck	P 2.0	351	6th	2nd
1968	(Germany) Porsche System Engineering	(West Germany) Rolf Stommelen	Porsche 908LH	P 3.0	325	3rd	2nd

=== Complete 24 Hours of Daytona results ===
Year	Team	Co-Drivers	Car	Class	Laps	Pos.	Class Pos.
1968	(Germany) Porsche System Engineering	(United Kingdom) Vic Elford (Germany) Rolf Stommelen (Switzerland) Jo Siffert (Germany) Hans Herrmann	Porsche 907LH	P	673	1st	1st

=== Complete 12 Hours of Sebring results ===
Year	Team	Co-Drivers	Car	Class	Laps	Pos.	Class Pos.
1968	(Germany) Porsche Automobile Company	(United Kingdom) Vic Elford	Porsche 907	P 3.0	226	2nd	2nd

=== Complete Targa Florio results ===
Year	Team	Co-Drivers	Car	Class	Laps	Pos.	Class Pos.
1964	(Germany) Porsche System Engineering	(Germany) Günther Klass	Porsche 356B Carrera 2000 GS/GT	GT; 2.0	10	7th	3rd
1967	(Germany) Porsche System Engineering	(United Kingdom) Vic Elford	Porsche 910	P 2.0	10	3rd	2nd
1968	(Germany) Porsche System Engineering	(Germany) Hans Herrmann	Porsche 907	P 3.0	10	4th	2nd
