= 1967 Targa Florio =

The 51° Targa Florio was a motor race which took place on 14 May 1967, on the Circuito Piccolo delle Madonie, Sicily (Italy). The race, which open to Prototypes, Sports Cars and Grand Touring Cars, was the fifth round of both the 1967 International Championship for Sports-Prototypes and the 1967 International Championship for Sports Cars.

The race was won by Paul Hawkins and Rolf Stommelen driving a Porsche 910/8 for Porsche System Engineering.

== Race ==
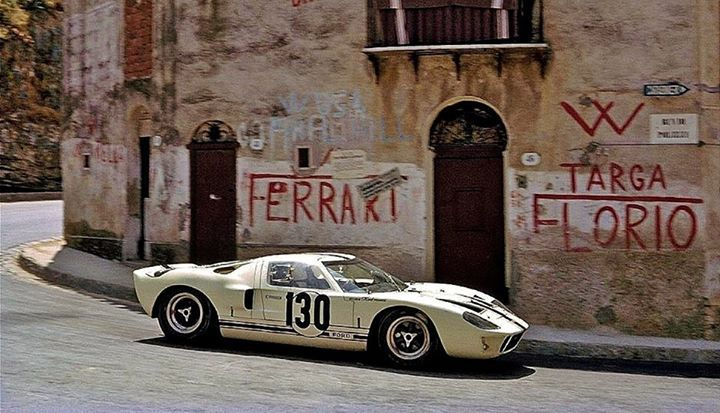
Henri Greder and Jean-Michel Giorgi placed fifth in a Ford GT40

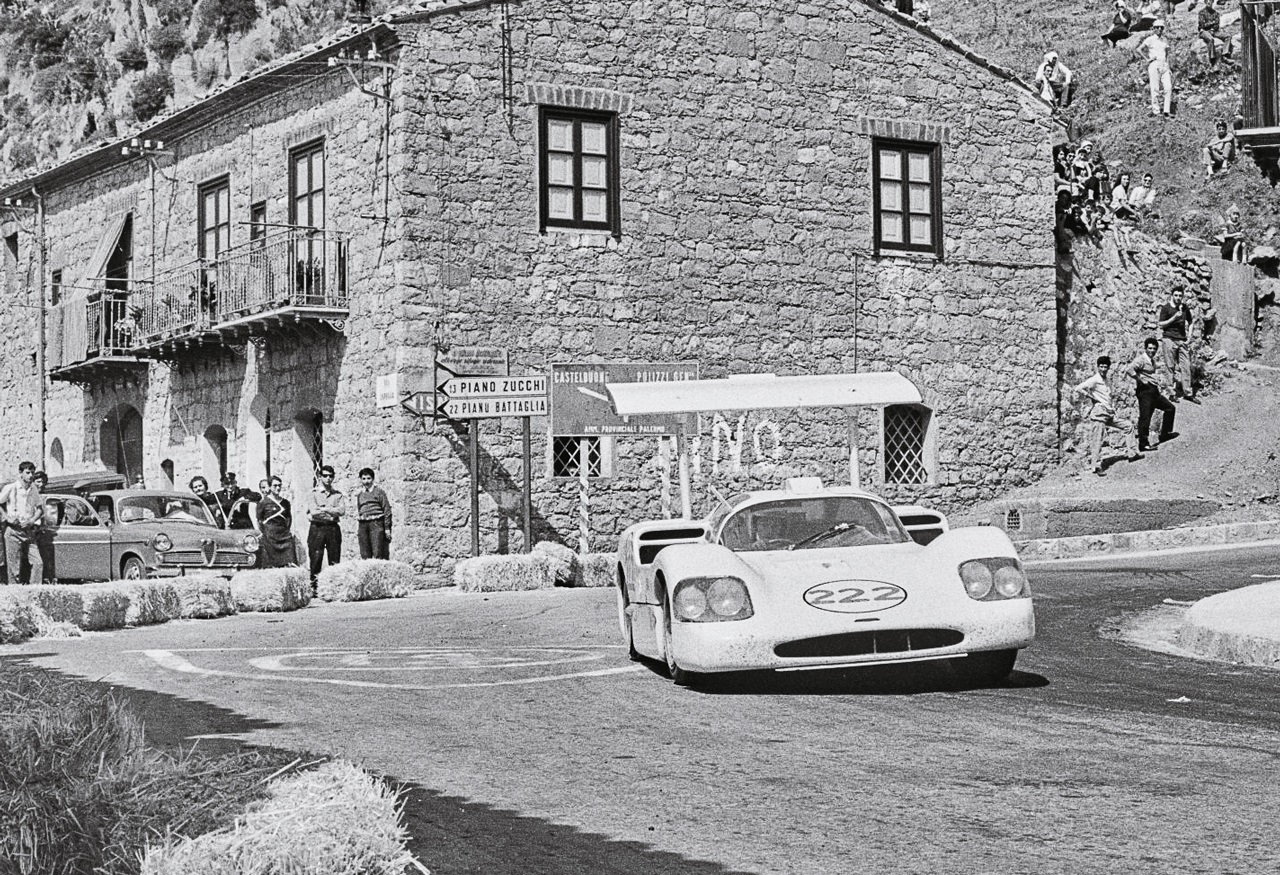
The Chaparral 2F of Hill/Sharp speeds through Collesano

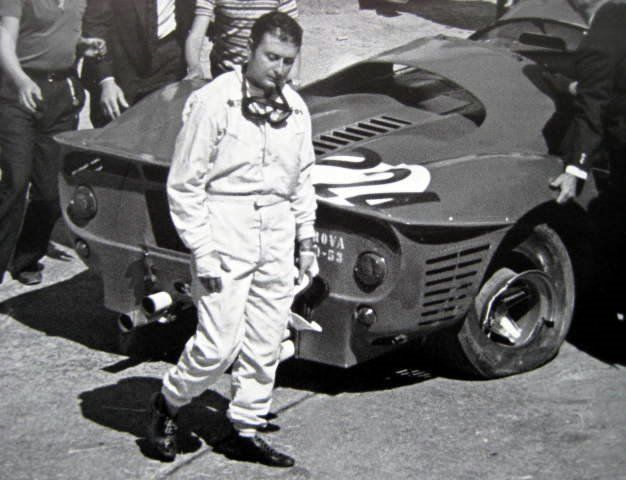
End of the race for Nino Vaccarella, who walks away from his damaged 330 P4

For the race, Scuderia Ferrari was unexpectedly deprived of Lorenzo Bandini, who died just four days earlier following a dramatic accident during the 1967 Monaco Grand Prix. Despite the loss, the race promised to be very competitive. Ferrari entrusted its 330 P4 to the duo Vaccarella/Scarfiotti and also deployed a smaller Dino 206 S. Porsche responded with its stable of 6 and 8-cylinders 910. Alfa Romeo deployed the relatively new 2.0 V8 Tipo 33. Ford and Lola supplied their GT40 and T70 respectively to privateers. A notable entrant was the Chaparral 2F of Hill/Sharp with its eye-catching high wing.

The 330 P4 started well, and soon took the lead. On the other hand, the heavy and bulky Chaparral soon proved to be unsuitable for tracks as twisty as Targa Florio, being easily overtaken by the nimbler 330 P4 and finally retiring due to a tire puncture. However, the lead of the 330 P4 was short-lived: while driving through Collesano during the second lap, Vaccarella made a driving error and smashed the two right wheels against a sidewalk. With the favorites out of the race, the lead was taken by the Scuderia Filipinetti Ferrari 412 P of Müller/Guichet which in turn retired soon after. With the best Ferraris out and the Tipo 33s never being a match for Porsche, the factory-backed 910s took a 1-2-3 finish thanks to their smooth and continuous pace.

== Official results ==
Pos	Class	No	Team	Drivers	Chassis	Laps
1	P +2.0	228	(Germany) Porsche System Engineering	(Australia) Paul Hawkins (Germany) Rolf Stommelen	Porsche 910/8	10
2	P 2.0	174	(Germany) Porsche System Engineering	(Italy) Leo Cella (Italy) Giampiero Biscaldi	Porsche 910/6	10
3	P 2.0	166	(Germany) Porsche System Engineering	(Germany) Jochen Neerpasch (England) Vic Elford	Porsche 910/6	10

World Sportscar Championship
Previous race: 1000 km Spa	1967 season	Next race: 1000 km Nurburgring
