= Circuit de Charade =

Motorsport track in France

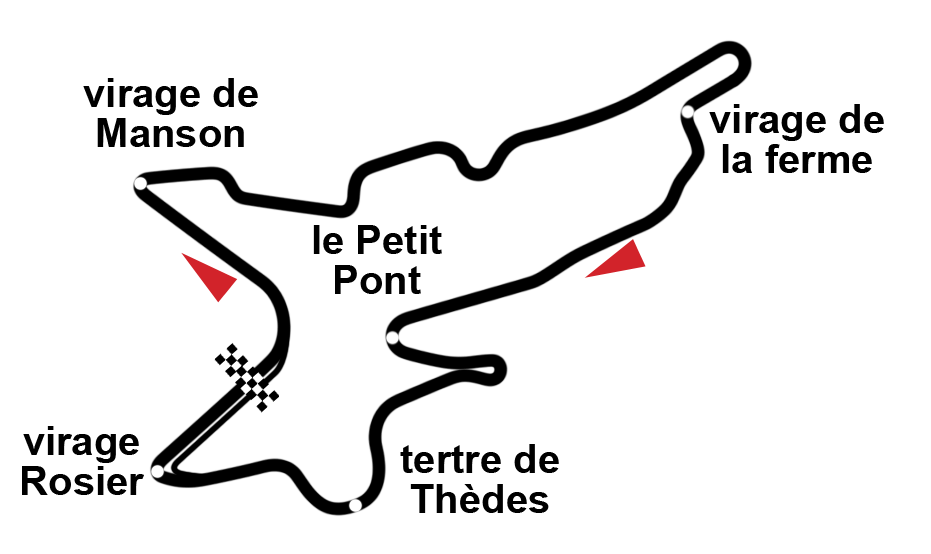
- Modern Circuit (1989–present)

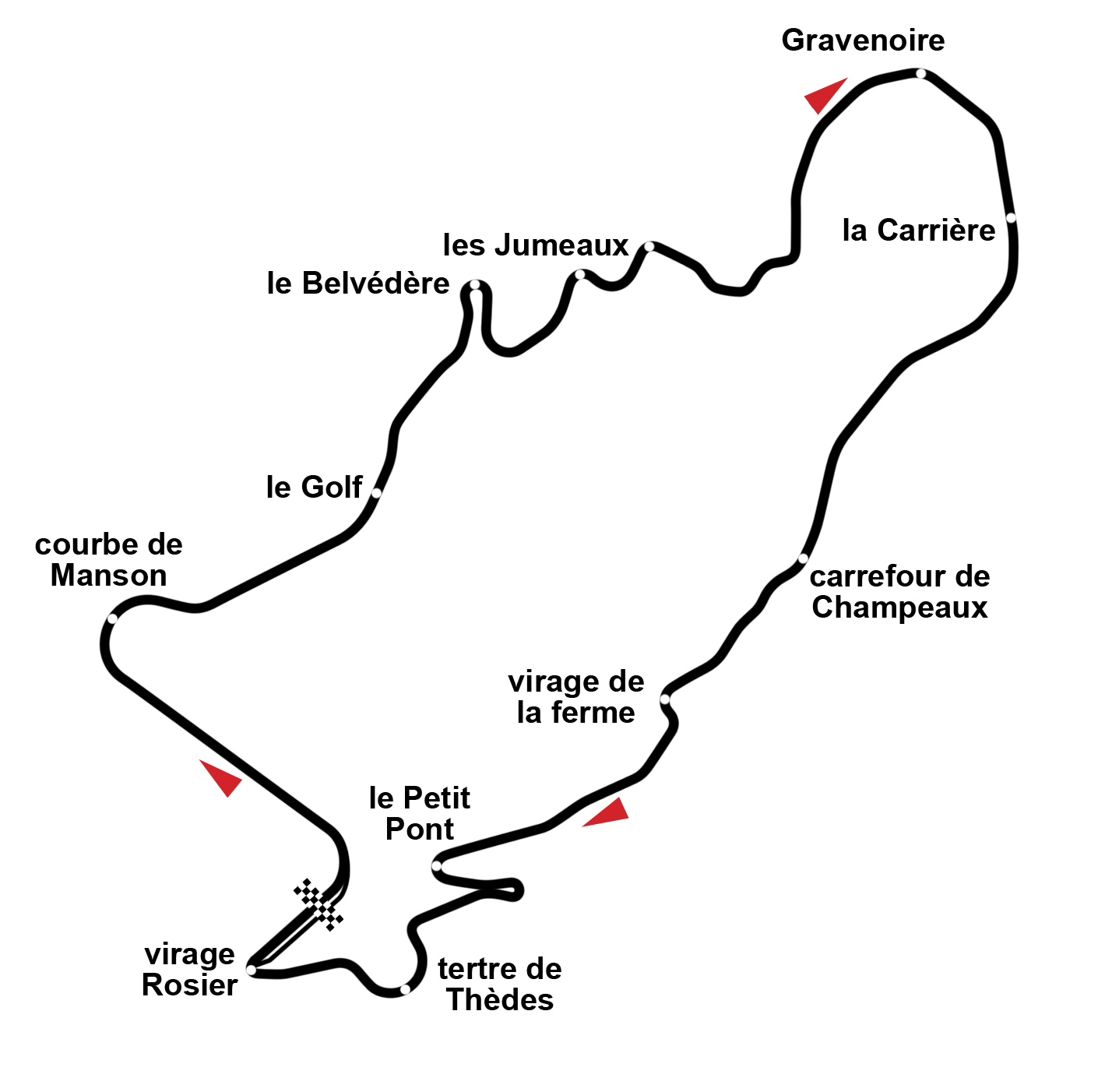
- The original 8.055 km version of the track
- Location: Saint-Genès-Champanelle, Auvergne, France
- Coordinates: 45°44′50″N 3°02′20″E
- Broke ground: May 1957; 69 years ago
- Opened: 27 July 1958; 68 years ago
- Major events: Former: Formula One; French Grand Prix (1965, 1969–1970, 1972); Grand Prix motorcycle racing French motorcycle Grand Prix (1959–1964, 1966–1967, 1972, 1974); Sidecar World Championship (1959–1962, 1964, 1966–1967, 1972, 1974); World Sportscar Championship (1962–1963); FFSA GT Championship (1998); French Supertouring Championship (1990–1991, 1994–1996, 1998–1999); Formula 750 (1973)
- Website: https://www.charade.fr/

Modern Circuit (1989–present)
- Length: 3.975 km (2.470 mi)
- Turns: 18
- Race lap record: 1:43.827 ( (France) Sébastien Bourdais, Martini MK79, 1999, F3)

Original Circuit (1958–1988)
- Length: 8.055 km (5.005 mi)
- Turns: 48
- Race lap record: 2:53.900 ( (New Zealand) Chris Amon, Matra MS120D, 1972, F1)

The Circuit de Charade, also known as Circuit Louis Rosier and Circuit Clermont-Ferrand, is a motorsport race track in Saint-Genès-Champanelle near Clermont-Ferrand in the Puy-de-Dôme department in Auvergne in central France. The circuit, built around the base of an extinct volcano, was known for its challenging layout which favored the most skillful drivers and motorcyclists. It hosted the French Grand Prix four times and the French motorcycle Grand Prix ten times.

== Circuit history ==
There had been local interest in motorsport racing beginning with proposals in 1908 for a race on a street circuit, although the proposals were never enacted. Efforts were renewed after the Second World War when the President of the Sports Association of the Automobile Club of Auvergne, Jean Auchatraire, and accomplished racer Louis Rosier designed a course by adapting pre-existing roads around the Puy de Grave Noire, an extinct volcano which dominates the city skyline. Construction began in May 1957 and the first race was held in July 1958 when an endurance race was won by Innes Ireland in a Lotus 1100, and a Formula Two race won by Maurice Trintignant in a Cooper T43.

Originally, the 8.055 km (5.005 mi) long circuit was described as an even twistier and faster version of the Nürburgring. With a relentless number of sharp curves and elevation changes and with almost no discernible straights, the circuit was both feared and respected by competitors. The sinuous track layout caused some drivers like Jochen Rindt in the 1969 French Grand Prix to complain of motion sickness, and wore open face helmets just in case. Despite the numerous curves, the track was relatively fast with Chris Amon setting the lap record in a Matra MS120 with a 167 km/h (104 mph) average during the 1972 French Grand Prix.

In his 1969 book Motor Cycle Racing, Peter Carrick wrote:

The French Grand Prix circuit at Clermont Ferrand was seen to be in complete contrast to the lap at Monza, when it was first used in 1959: the longest straight was 590 m (650 yd) and a variety of really tight corners quickly demonstrated—or exposed—a rider's skill!

The venue first gained international prominence when it hosted the French motorcycle Grand Prix in 1959, won by John Surtees riding an MV Agusta. The circuit would host the French motorcycle Grand Prix ten times between 1959 and 1974. In 1959, Stirling Moss competed on the track for the first time and declared: "I don't know a more wonderful track than Charade". Also in 1959, Ivor Bueb winner of the 1955 24 Hours of Le Mans, died following a crash at the Charade Circuit. The death would mark the only driver fatality at the circuit. The only motorcyclist fatality occurred when Marcelin Herranz was killed on June 1, 1963 during the 250cc race of the French motorcycle Grand Prix.

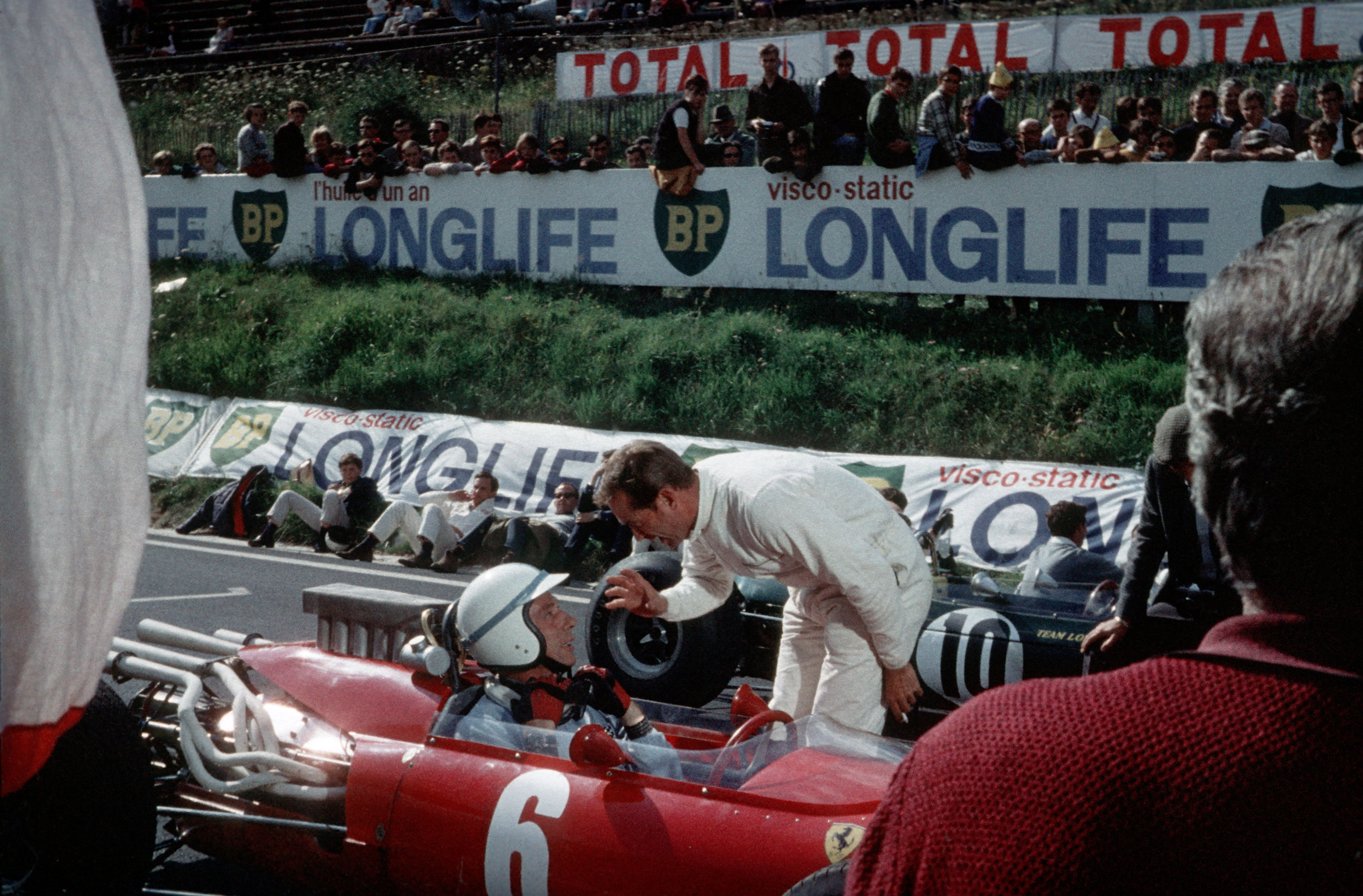
Yves Montand in a scene filmed at Circuit de Charade for the 1966 film, Grand Prix.

The 1964 Trophées d'Auvergne Formula 2 race podium was a sign of things to come: Denny Hulme, Jackie Stewart and Jochen Rindt showed their skill before the circuit hosted its first Formula 1 race when Jim Clark won the 1965 French Grand Prix for Team Lotus. In 1965, John Frankenheimer filmed a small part of his movie Grand Prix in front of 3,000 local inhabitants, who posed as race spectators watching actors like Yves Montand and Françoise Hardy. In total four Formula One French Grand Prix were held at Charade, in 1965, 1969, 1970 and 1972.

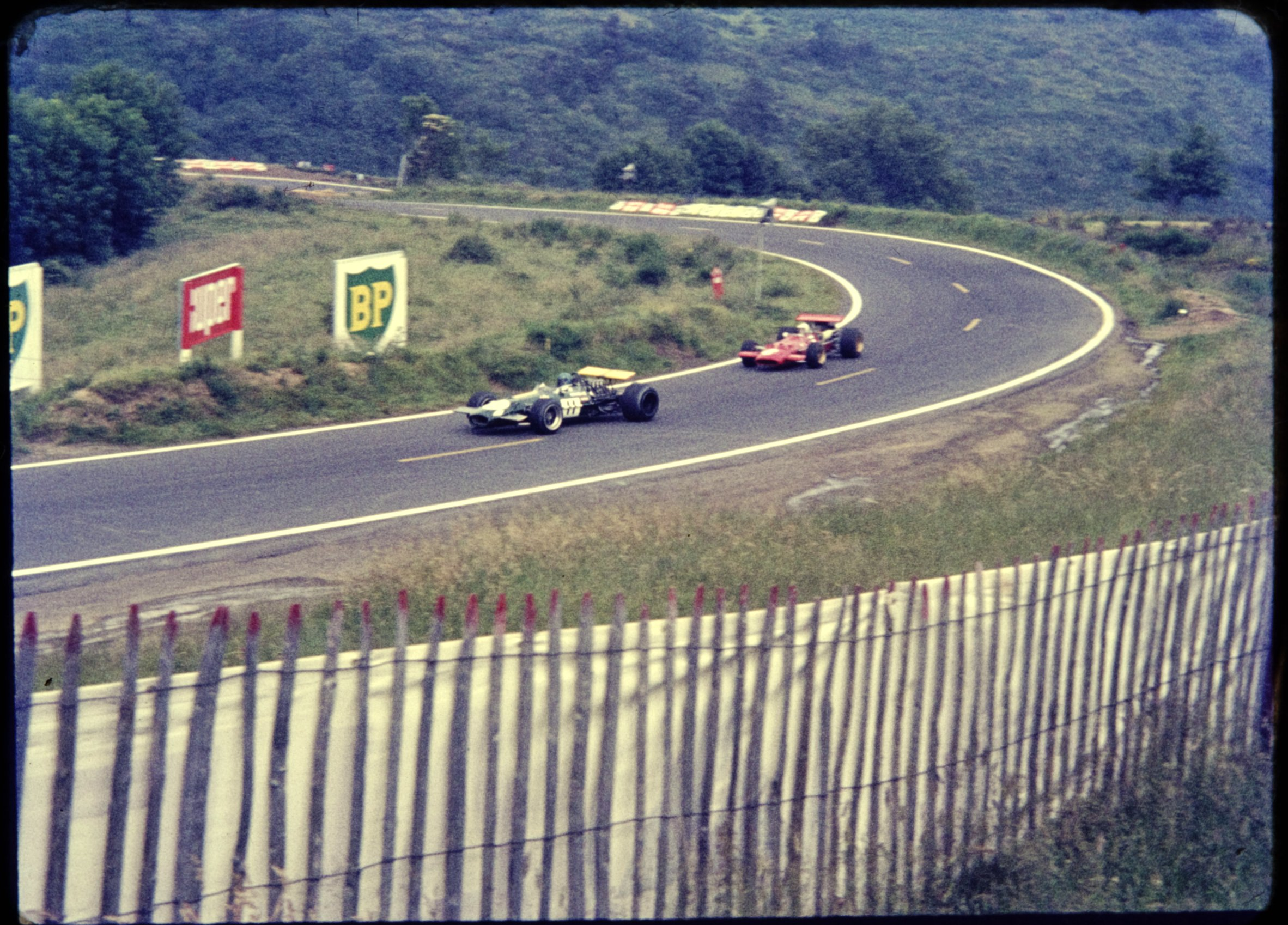
Jacky Ickx and Chris Amon competing during the 1969 French Grand Prix.

While the circuit's natural setting created conditions for a sinuous, challenging race course, it also created safety concerns due to the dark, volcanic rocks which routinely fell from the mountain onto both sides of the track. The rocks posed a perennial hazard at the Charade Circuit, as was shown during the 1972 French Grand Prix when ten drivers, including Chris Amon, suffered tire punctures. Drivers who skirted the track edge would send rocks flying in the middle of the road and into the path of pursuing competitors. One particular incident at the 1972 French Grand Prix involved a rock penetrating Helmut Marko's helmet visor after being kicked up from ahead of him, cutting his racing career short as his left eye was subsequently blinded. The mountainous topography also left no room to provide safe run-off areas in the event of competitors losing control of their vehicles and unintentionally leaving the race course.

The venue became increasingly shunned by international racing series as concerns about the public roads' dangerous nature rose. In 1971, the newly built and much safer Circuit Paul Ricard held the French Grand Prix for the first time, before becoming the event's permanent home from 1973 to 1990, alternating the French Grand Prix with the Circuit Dijon-Prenois. It continued to host smaller motorsports competitions such as Formula 3, sports car racing, touring car racing, rallying and hillclimbing as well as the Trophées d'Auverne. In 1980, three track marshals were killed at a touring car race, and in 1984 there was a drivers protest over track safety. Faced with increasing safety issues and with the natural topography preventing any chance of adding run-off areas, the final race on the original 8.055 km (5.005 mi) track was held on September 18, 1988.

== Modernization ==
The General Council of Puy-de-Dôme recognized the importance of the race track to the local economy and financed the building of a new 3.975 km (2.470 mi) circuit utilising only the southern portion of the original, with a new link road completing the circuit. The new Circuit de Charade opened in 1989 hosting national championship races in the 1994 French Supertouring Championship and the 1998 FFSA GT Championship.

Currently, the venue holds events such as track days, driving courses as well as historic motorsport events. In 2000, the roads were closed to the public, with the track becoming a truly permanent facility with new pit garages and a widened pit lane. The original sections of the 8.055 km (5.005 mi) street circuit are still in use as public roadways. Part of the circuit was ridden by riders on stage 10 of 2025 Tour de France.

== Lap records ==
As of June 1999, the fastest official race lap records at the Circuit de Charade are listed as:

Category	Time	Driver	Vehicle	Event
Modern Circuit (1989–present): 3.975 km (2.470 mi)
Formula Three	1:43.827	Sébastien Bourdais	Martini MK79	1999 Charade French F3 round
GT2 (GT1)	1:53.679	Jean-Pierre Jarier	Porsche 911 GT2	1998 Charade FFSA GT round
Formula Renault 2.0	1:56.600	Olivier Couvreur	Alpa FR90	1990 Charade French Formula Renault round
Original Circuit (1958–1988): 8.055 km (5.005 mi)
Formula One	2:53.900	Chris Amon	Matra MS120D	1972 French Grand Prix
Sports 2000	3:05.300	Derek Bell	Abarth-Osella PA2	1974 Charade European Sportscar Championship round
Group 6	3:10.800	Gérard Larrousse	Matra-Simca MS660	1971 Trophées d'Auvergne
Formula Three	3:15.500	Jacques Laffite	Martini MK14	1973 Charade French F3 round
Formula Renault 2.0	3:18.170	André Bourdon	Martini MK36	1990 Charade French Formula Renault round
500cc	3:32.400	Giacomo Agostini	Yamaha YZR500	1974 French motorcycle Grand Prix
350cc	3:33.800	Giacomo Agostini	Yamaha TZ 350	1974 French motorcycle Grand Prix
Formula Two	3:40.900	Richard Attwood	Lola T54	1964 Trophées d'Auvergne
Formula Junior	3:43.800	Richard Attwood	Lola Mk5A	1963 Trophées d'Auvergne Formula Junior
125cc	3:48.900	Bill Ivy	Yamaha 125 V4	1967 French motorcycle Grand Prix
250cc	3:36.000	Mike Hailwood	Honda RC166	1967 French motorcycle Grand Prix
Sports cars	3:50.100	Tony Hegbourne (Note: Both drivers took the same lap time independently.); Lorenzo Bandini	Lotus 23B; Ferrari 250 TRI61	1963 Trophées d'Auvergne
50cc	4:18.300	Henk van Kessel	Kreidler 50 GP	1974 French motorcycle Grand Prix
