= Austin-Healey Sebring Sprite =

Sports car produced by Donald Healey Motor Company

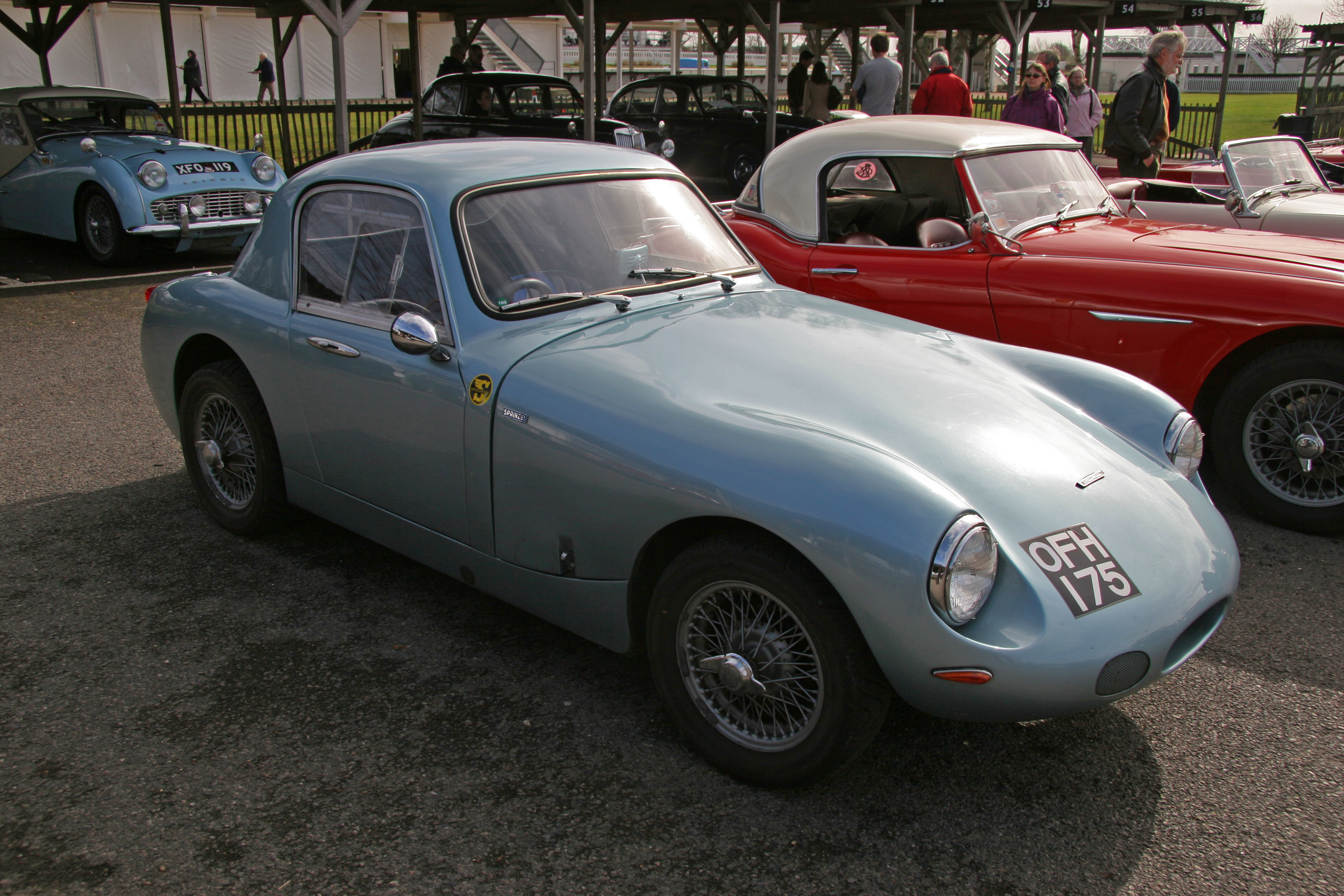
Modern replica of a Sprinzel Sebring Sprite produced by Brian Archer. Fitted with a replica of the Speedwell GT bonnet designed by Frank Costin

The Austin-Healey Sebring Sprite is a small sports car that was produced by the Donald Healey Motor Company at its Cape Works in Warwick and at the Healey's Speed Equipment Division in Grosvenor Street, London W1. Sebring Sprites were also produced by John Sprinzel Ltd. at their premises in Lancaster Mews, W2.

A modified version of the production Austin-Healey Sprite featuring Girling disc brakes as well as specified engine and chassis improvements, the Sebring Sprite was recognized by motorsport's governing body, the Fédération Internationale de l'Automobile (FIA), as a separate model in its own right. It was homologated on 17 September 1960. FIA regulations permitted the use of 'special bodies', so a small number of Sebring Sprites were subsequently fitted with coupé bodywork in aluminium alloy and glassfibre. The most attractive examples were those devised by race and rally driver John Sprinzel, who had won the 1959 RAC British Rally Championship. Sprinzel commissioned coachbuilders Williams & Pritchard to produce the bodies. Originally said to have numbered six, eight are now known to have been made. Later, other Sprites received similar alloy bodywork from Alec Goldie and Fred Faulkner of the firm Robert Peel Sheet Metal Works (commonly known as 'Peel Coachworks'). The name 'Sebring Sprite' became a generic term for any Sprite with disc brakes, and later for any Sprite with coupé or fastback bodywork.

== Class domination at the 1959 Twelve Hours of Sebring ==
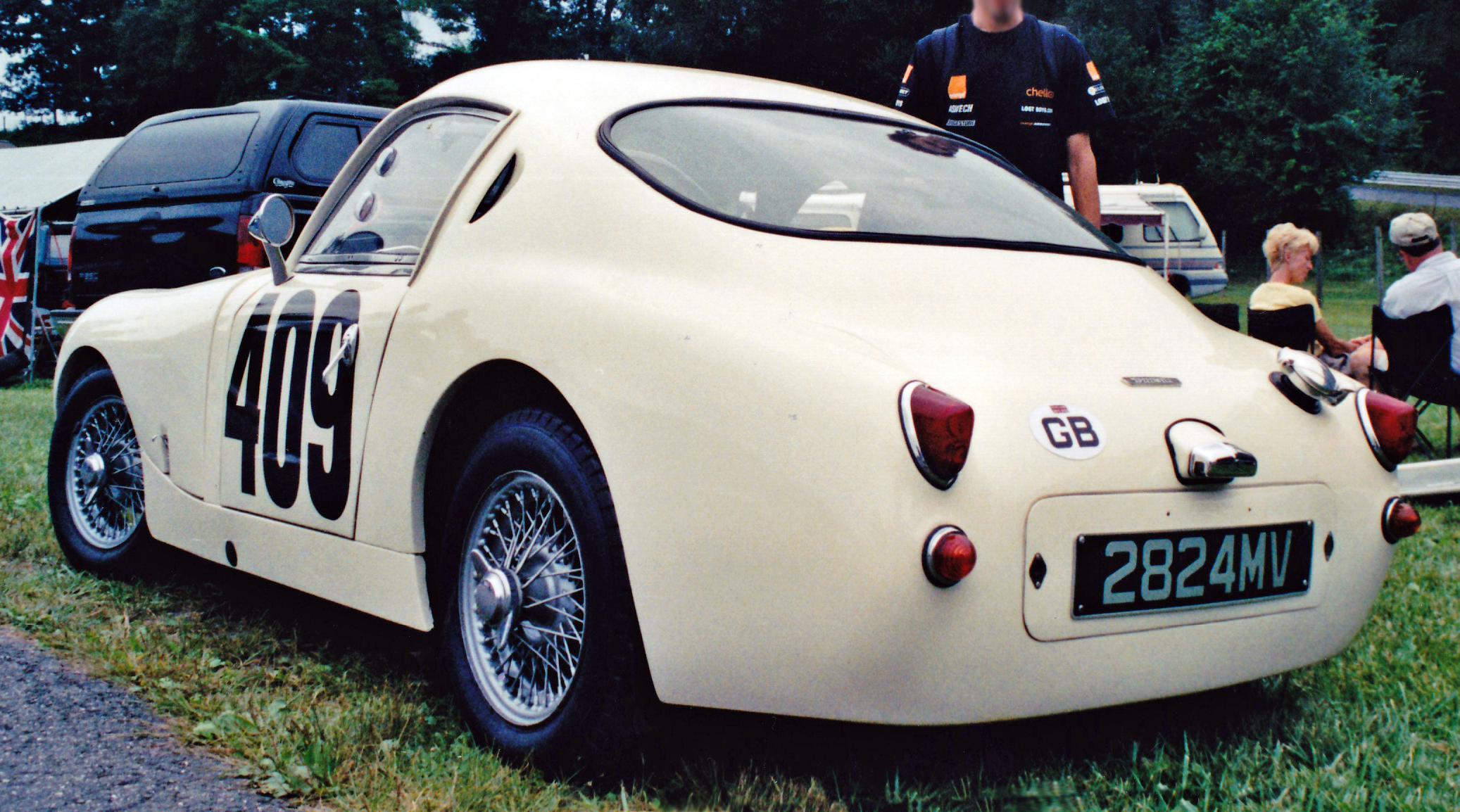
Rear view of a period Speedwell Sprite which competed on the 1960 Liège–Rome–Liège rally.

For the long-distance race at Sebring, Florida, in March 1959, the BMC Competition Department entered three Austin-Healey Sprites in the 12 Hours Grand Prix d'Endurance. The cars were prepared by Donald's son Geoffrey Healey at the company's Cape Works in Warwick, and were fitted with prototype disc brakes on all four wheels as well as wire wheels and tyres, all courtesy of Dunlop. Larger twin 1 1/4-inch SU carburettors gave the engines more performance and special twin-plate racing clutches took the drive to straight-cut close-ratio gearboxes. The cars were raced by Hugh Sutherland, Phil Stiles, Ed Leavens, Dr Harold Kunz, Fred Hayes, John Christy and John Colgate Jnr. Despite setbacks, the Sprites managed to finish first, second and third in their class, and their success in this premier sportscar race, which was part of FIA World Sportscar Championship, gave valuable publicity to BMC in the important North American market.

== Healey Sebring Sprites ==
The Healeys subsequently offered to bring customers' Sprites to a specification similar to that of the Sebring cars, though using twin 1 1/2-inch SU H4 carburettors and a complete replacement braking system by Girling. The brakes comprised 8 1/2-inch 'Type 9' calliper discs for the front wheels and 8-inch drums at the rear, with all brake lines, unions, flexibles and fluid replaced with Girling equipment. The Sebring Sprite registered 888 HPA was owned, tuned and raced by Beatrice Shilling, an aeronautical engineer now hailed a Second World War hero for making a small but life-saving improvement to the Rolls-Royce Merlin engines fitted to both the RAF's Hurricane and Spitfire fighter aircraft. These Healey Sebring Sprites were modified at The Cape Works, and from early 1960 also at the small workshop at the London showrooms in Grosvenor Street, where the Healey Speed Equipment Division was located, run by then-reigning British Rally Champion Sprinzel and with future F1 driver Paul Hawkins as chief mechanic.

In 1957, Sprinzel founded the successful tuning firm Speedwell Performance Conversions Ltd, where he was joined by future Formula 1 World Champion Graham Hill. Speedwell developed the Speedwell GT, a sleek, alloy-bodied Sprite coupe designed by aerodynamicist Frank Costin and built by Williams & Pritchard. In early 1960, Donald Healey managed to lure Sprinzel away from Speedwell by inviting him to set up the Healey Speed Equipment Division at Grosvenor Street, with the added incentive of Healey works drives at both Sebring and Le Mans.

== Sebring 1960 ==
Due to safety concerns arising from the speed differential between the smallest and largest-engined cars, a separate four-hour race for GT cars of under one litre was organized at Sebring in 1960. Stirling Moss drove a Sebring Sprite to a class win and second overall in this event. In the twelve-hour race, Sprinzel drove a prototype Sprite with a GRP Falcon kit-car body, built and entered by the Donald Healey Motor Company, to another class win and 41st place overall.

== Sprinzel Sebring Sprites ==
Leaving the Healeys to set up his own tuning and race preparation concern at Lancaster Mews in December 1960, Sprinzel launched his Williams & Pritchard-bodied coupé to immediate acclaim at the Racing Car Show in London. Sprinzel Sebring Sprites were soon being built for racers Cyril Simson (S 221), Chris Williams (52 LPH), Ian Walker (WJB 707), Andrew Hedges (410 EAO) and for BMC works rally driver David Seigle-Morris (D 20). Sprinzel's personal Sebring Sprite bore the registration number PMO 200, and he campaigned the car at Sebring and in international rallies as well as races throughout the 1961 season, culminating in an outright win in the Targa Rusticana rally at the beginning of 1962.

== Sebring 1961 ==
No less than 7 Sebring Sprites contested the long-distance races at Sebring in 1961. Five Healey-prepared BMC works cars were driven by Ed Leavens, Briggs Cunningham, Dick Thompson, Bruce McLaren and Walt Hansgen. There were also two of Sprinzel's striking coupes, piloted by one of the top-rated Grand Prix drivers of all time, Stirling Moss, together with his sister Pat Moss, Britain's most successful woman rally driver. The Sebring Sprites finished in six of the top eight places in the 4-hour race for one-litre homologated GT cars. In the 12-hour race, Sebring Sprites were driven by Ed Leavens, John Colgate, Joe Buzetta, Glenn Carlson, Cyril Simson and Paul Hawkins to strong performances, finishing 2nd, 3rd and 4th in the 1150 cc sports (prototype) class and 15th and 25th and 37th overall.

== Later Sebring Sprites ==
Over the years, the cars were sold to privateers who raced and rallied them. In later years, the Sebring Sprite became a prized possession and the object of veneration within the Austin-Healey fraternity. Enthusiasts sought out the cars, sometimes discovering them in advanced stages of deterioration. Today, the cars are cherished classics that can be driven to and from competitions just like the originals were in their day. Subsequently, numbers of other Sprites were modified as period replicas of the original Speedwell GTs and Sprinzel Sebring Sprites, built to the same homologation specification.

One such car is the "Lumbertubs" Sprite, built in 1963 by brothers Brian and Ken Myers and named for the lane they lived on. The alloy roof was crafted by Alan Thompson of Aston Martin and a fibreglass Williams & Pritchard Sprinzel Sebring bonnet was fitted. It later acquired a Ford engine and gearbox, gaining some success in sprints and hillclimbs and a class win at Silverstone on 24 June 1967.
