= Paul Hawkins (racing driver) =

Australian racing driver (1937–1969)

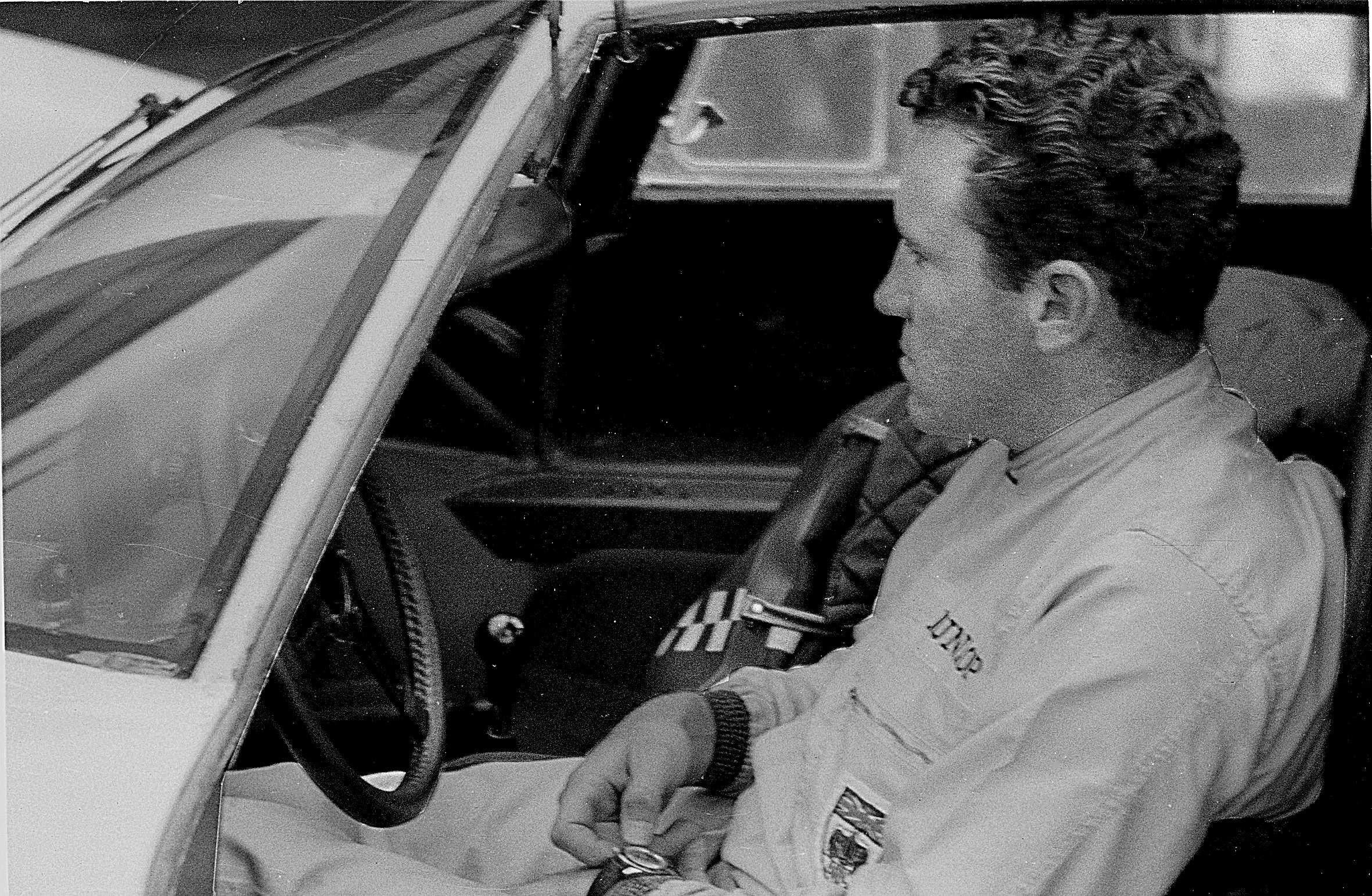
- Hawkins in 1966
- Born: 12 October 1937; Richmond, Melbourne, Victoria, Australia
- Died: 26 May 1969 (aged 31); Oulton Park, Cheshire, England, UK

Formula One World Championship career
- Nationality: (Australia) Australian
- Active years: 1965
- Team(s): non-works Brabham and Lotus
- Entries: 3
- Championships: 0
- Wins: 0
- Podiums: 0
- Career points: 0
- Pole positions: 0
- Fastest laps: 0
- First entry: 1965 South African Grand Prix
- Last entry: 1965 German Grand Prix

Robert Paul Hawkins (12 October 1937 – 26 May 1969) was an Australian motor racing driver. The son of a racing motorcyclist-turned-church minister, Hawkins was a capable single-seater driver but really made his mark as an outstanding sports car competitor driving Ford GT40s and Lola T70s. In 1969 Hawkins was included in the FIA list of graded drivers, an elite group of 27 drivers who by their achievements were rated the best in the world.

Hawkins was popular and known as Hawkeye; the son of a clergyman, he was described as a colourful character with a wide vocabulary. He was also known for being one of two racers to crash into the harbour at the Monaco Grand Prix.

== Early racing career ==
Hawkins began racing in Australia with an Austin-Healey in 1958. He left Australia and arrived in England in 1960. He found employment with the Donald Healey Motor Company Ltd., under John Sprinzel:

"I put an ad in the Evening Standard newspaper looking for a mechanic and employed a really good guy to be our works foreman; his name was Paul Hawkins. Paul literally came in straight off the boat from Australia. He’d done a little bit of racing and was a very good mechanic, very good as he knew his stuff, and certainly knew the best parts of the English language, too."

Hawkins was soon behind the wheel of an Austin-Healey Sprite, racing at the Aintree 200 meeting on 30 April 1960, and winning his class in the GT race. He then finished 38th at the 1960 Nürburgring 1000 km race, with co-driver Cyril Simson, known as Team 221, on a "miserable foggy day in May". In 1961 at Le Mans Hawkins teamed with John Colgate in an Austin-Healey Sprite, but they retired in the eighth hour with engine problems. On Whit Monday, 1962, at Crystal Palace Hawkins drove Ian Walker's Lotus-Ford to victory in the up to 1,150 c.c. sports car race, setting lap and race records. At Le Mans in 1965 Hawkins, with John Rhodes, finished twelfth overall, and first in class, in a 1.3-litre Austin-Healey Sebring Sprite entered by the Donald Healey Motor Company, completing 278 laps.

Hawkins also drove single-seaters, participating in the first race run to the new Formula Two regulations at Pau on 5 April 1964, finishing seventh in a pushrod Alexis. He was entered in a Team Alexis Alexis-Cosworth at Silverstone on 20 March 1965 but the race was abandoned due to heavy rain. He went on to win the Formula Two Eifelrennen race on the Nürburgring south circuit, in bad weather, in an Alexis-Cosworth Mk. 7 on 25 April 1965.

== Formula One racing ==
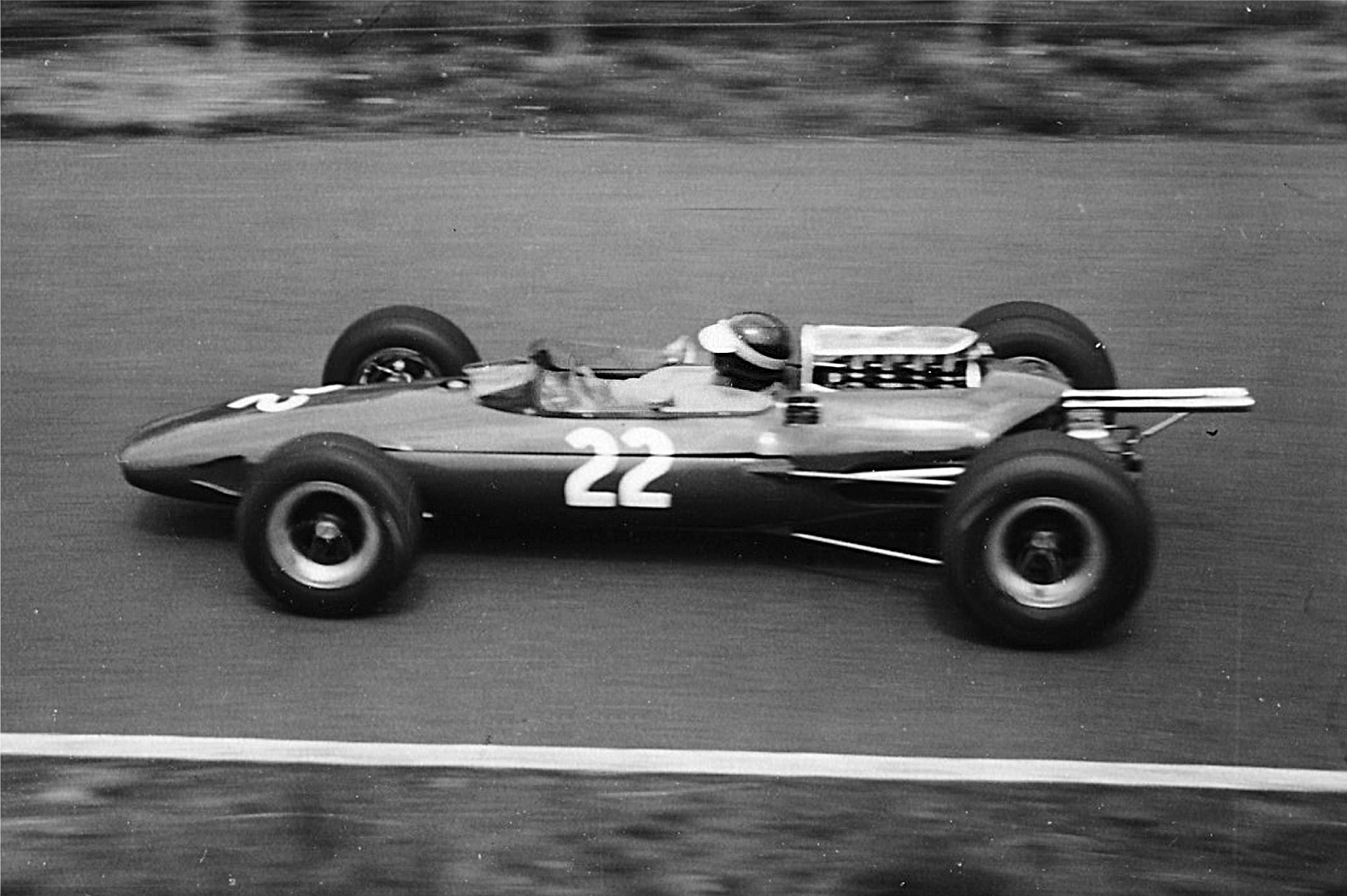
Hawkins driving a privately entered Lotus at the 1965 German Grand Prix.

Hawkins participated in three Formula One World Championship Grands Prix, debuting on 1 January 1965 at the South African Grand Prix in a pushrod Ford 1500cc-engined Brabham Formula Two car. Like fellow-Australian Frank Gardner he started with the John Willment Automobiles team. He scored no championship points, as his best finish was ninth on his debut. He did have two podium finishes in the non-championship Rand Grand Prix, held in South Africa. He finished second in 1964 and third in 1965. In 1964, he won the Rhodesian Grand Prix in the Brabham and in 1965, he also won the Cape South Easter Formula One Trophy. He was a non-starter in the 1965 British Grand Prix and retired from the German Grand Prix that year with an oil leak.

Hawkins is one of only two Formula One drivers, along with Italian Alberto Ascari, to have crashed into the harbour in Monaco during a Grand Prix. He did so during the 1965 race, when he spun at the chicane after 79 of the 100 laps. He escaped from the crash unhurt:

"At this point there was a bit of a furore at the chicane for Hawkins struck the wooden barrier at the entry and spun through the straw bales and over the edge of the quay and into the harbour. The Lotus sank to the bottom and the rugged Australian bobbed to the surface and struck out for shore, while boats went to his rescue."

== Sports car racing ==
Hawkins had some considerable success in the World Sports Car Championship. On 14 May 1967, he won the Targa Florio, in Sicily, teamed with Rolf Stommelen, in the factory-entered 8-cylinder Porsche 910. On 23 May 1967, he finished second in the Nürburgring 1000 km in a Porsche 910. He also won the Zeltweg 500 km race on 20 August 1967, in a Ford GT40. On 15 October 1967, at the end of the season Hawkins, paired with Jacky Ickx, won the Paris 1000 km race at Montlhéry in a J.W. Automotive Mirage.

Then on 25 April 1968, Hawkins won the Monza 1000 km race with David Hobbs in a Ford GT40, finished second in the Watkins Glen 6-hour, again with Hobbs, and scored thirds at the Nürburgring 1000 km with Jacky Ickx and Zeltweg 500 km races. On 23 November 1968, he won the Cape Town Three Hours solo in a Ferrari P4.

Hawkins was building a business as an owner/operator of racing cars, and in the spring of 1969 he moved his racing shop from North London to Slough. He was killed when his Lola T70 MkIIIB GT crashed and burned at Island Bend during the 1969 RAC Tourist Trophy at Oulton Park.

Contemporary Mike Hailwood gave the following quote in the Daily Mirror article concerning Hawkins' death: "The news of his death horrified me. I can hardly believe that a man as skilful and as experienced as he was should be killed in this way."

== Racing record ==
=== Complete Formula One World Championship results ===
(key)

Year	Entrant	Chassis	Engine	1	2	3	4	5	6	7	8	9	10	WDC	Points
1965	John Willment Automobiles	Brabham BT10 (F2)	Ford Straight-4	RSA; 9										NC	0
1965	DW Racing Enterprises	Lotus 33	Climax V8		MON; 10	BEL	FRA	GBR	NED	GER; Ret	ITA	USA	MEX	NC	0

=== Formula One Non-Championship results ===
(key)

Year	Entrant	Chassis	Engine	1	2	3	4	5	6	7	8
1964	John Willment Automobiles	Lola T55	Cosworth Straight-4	DMT	NWT	SYR	AIN	INT	SOL	MED; Ret	
1964	John Willment Automobiles	Brabham BT10 (F2)	Ford Straight-4								RAN; 2
1965	John Willment Automobiles	Brabham BT10	Climax Straight-4	CAP; 1							
1965	DW Racing Enterprises	Lotus 33	Climax V8		ROC; 10		SMT; Ret	INT; 10	MED; WD		
1965	DW Racing Enterprises	Lotus 24	Climax V8			SYR; WD					
1965	Reg Parnell (Racing)	Lotus 25	Climax Straight-4							RAN; 3	
1966	Reg Parnell Racing	Lotus 25	Climax Straight-4	RSA; Ret	SYR; Ret	INT; 8	OUL				

=== Complete British Saloon Car Championship results ===
(key) (Races in bold indicate pole position; races in italics indicate fastest lap.)

Year	Team	Car	Class	1	2	3	4	5	6	7	8	9	10	11	Pos.	Pts	Class
1966	John Willment Automobiles	Ford Cortina Lotus	C	SNE	GOO	SIL	CRY ovr:6† cls:2†	BRH	BRH	OUL	BRH				24th	6	7th
1967	Team Lotus	Ford Cortina Lotus	C	BRH	SNE	SIL	SIL	MAL	SIL ovr:4 cls:1	SIL ovr:4 cls:1	BRH	OUL	BRH		15th	16	4th
1968	Malcolm Gartlan Racing	Ford Falcon Sprint	D	BRH	THR	SIL	CRY	MAL; Ret†	BRH	SIL	CRO	OUL	BRH	BRH	NC	0	NC

† Events with 2 races staged for the different classes.

=== 24 Hours of Le Mans results ===
Year	Team	Co-drivers	Car	Class	Laps	Pos.	Class pos.
1961	(United Kingdom) Donald Healey Motor Company	(United States) John K. Colgate Jr.	Austin-Healey Sebring Sprite	S 1.0	64	DNF	DNF
1965	(United Kingdom) Donald Healey Motor Company	(United Kingdom) John Rhodes	Austin-Healey Sebring Sprite	P 1.3	278	12th	**1st**
1966	(United States) Ford Motor Company (United States) Holman & Moody	(United States) Mark Donohue	Ford GT40 Mk.II	P +5.0	12	DNF	DNF
1967	(United States) Ford Motor Company (United States) Shelby-American Inc.	(United States) Ronnie Bucknum	Ford GT40 Mk.IIB	P +5.0	271	DNF	DNF
1968	(United Kingdom) JW Automotive Engineering	(United Kingdom) David Hobbs	Ford GT40	S 5.0	107	DNF	DNF

=== Bathurst 500 results ===
Year	Team	Co-drivers	Car	Class	Laps	Pos.	Class pos.
1967	M.W. Motors Pty. Ltd.	(Australia) Syd Fisher	Alfa Romeo 1600 GTV	E	117	25th	5th
1968	Holden Dealer Racing Team	(Australia) Bill Brown	Holden HK Monaro GTS327	D	N/A	DSQ	DSQ

== See also ==
- Austin-Healey Sebring Sprite
