= Alexis Cars =

British constructor of racing cars

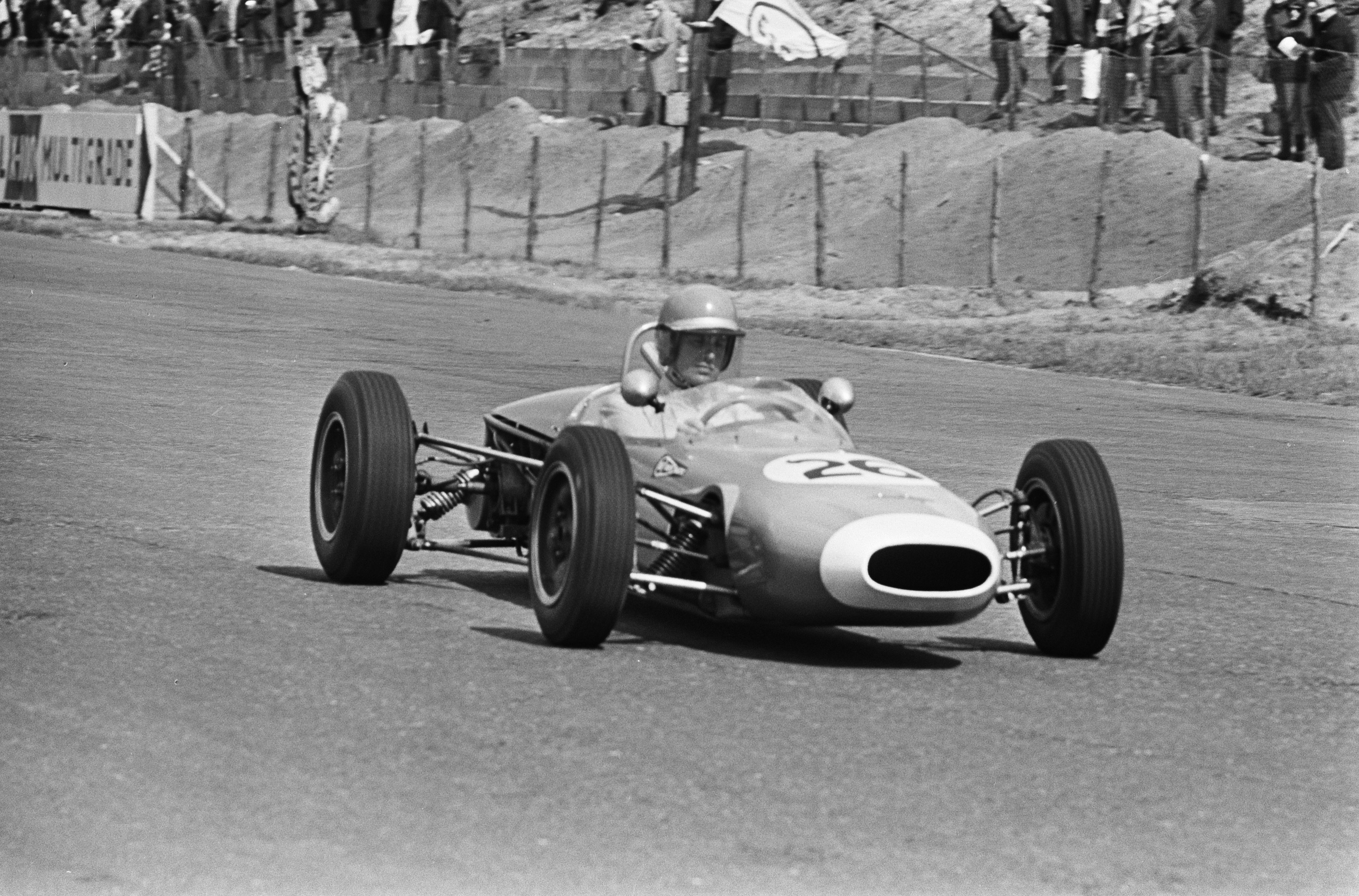
- Alexis Mk.5 at Zolder
- Industry: Automotive
- Genre: Racing cars
- Founded: 1959
- Founder: Alex Francis; Bill Harris
- Defunct: 1976
- Headquarters: Sutton Coldfield, Warwickshire, England
- Key people: Allan Taylor; Doug Christie
- Products: Single-seater racing cars

Alexis Cars was a British constructor of racing cars. It was formed in 1959 by Alex Francis and Australian Bill Harris. They built cars for Formula Junior, F100, Formula Ford, Formula 3, Formula B, Formula Atlantic and Formula 2 racing classes.

Alex Francis, originally a building contractor, was a trials car builder. Bill Harris was a speedway rider, racing mechanic, and racing car designer from Australia. The company was established in Ward End, Birmingham, where Francis lived. When Bill Harris returned to Australia in 1965, Allan Taylor took his place. Alexis operation remained small, usually building a few racing cars for its own racing team and selling them at the end of the season, until the late 1960's when Formula Ford was born and became popular.

By winning the first Formula Ford championships in England and Scotland with Mk.11 in 1967, Alexis gained a reputation as a racing car constructor. Mk.15 (Formula Ford) and Mk.18 (Formula Ford and Formula 3) became a big success, firmly establishing the financial foundation.
Disliking running the larger-scale company, Alex Francis sold the ownership to Allan Taylor in 1968; and Doug Christie, who was responsible for the engine shop, joined Taylor as the co-director. In 1970, the company moved to Hallaughton Farm, an old cheese dairy in Sutton Coldfield, on the outskirts of Birmingham.

== Cars ==
Year	Model	Racing class	Notable engines used	Notes	Drivers
1960-1961	HF1	Formula Junior	BMC A-series engine	Front engine. Drum brakes. Steel space frame. Aluminium body	Alex Francis
1960-1961	HF2	Formula Junior	Ford Anglia 1.0L 105E bored out to 1,098cc	Front engine. Drum brakes. Steel space frame. Aluminium body	
1960-1961	Mk.3	Formula Junior	Ford Anglia 1.0L 105E bored out to 1,098cc	Midship engine. All-disc brakes, Hewland Mk.III	
1962	Mk.4	Formula Junior	Cosworth Mk.IV	Midship engine. All-disc brakes, Hewland Mk.III	
1963-1964	Mk.4	Formula 2	Cosworth Mk.III (Note: Paul Hawkins obtained Cosworth SCA in 1965.)	Hewland Mk.III, 7th (Hawkins) at 1964 Pau Grand Prix	Paul Hawkins
1963-1964	Mk.4	Formula 3	Cosworth Mk.III	Converted to F3 spec, Hewland Mk.III	
1963-1964	Mk.5	Formula Junior	Cosworth Mk.IV	Fibreglass body	John Ampt
1963-1964	Mk.5	Formula 3	Cosworth Mk.III	One car sold to DAF, Variomatic transmission, raced in 1964-65	Henk van Zalinge; Rob Slotemaker
1963-1964	Mk.5	Formula 3	Cosworth Mk.III	For Team Alexis, 2nd (Ampt) at Eifelrennen in 1964	John Ampt (Note: This referenced website lists Cosworth Mk.III incorrectly as Cosworth MAE.); Terry Ogilvie-Hardy
1963-1964	Mk.5	Formula 2	Cosworth Mk.III	Team Alexis, 6th (Hawkins) at Eifelrennen in 1964	Paul Hawkins
1963-1964	Mk.6	Formula 3/2	Cosworth Mk.III / Cosworth SCA	Designed by Bill Harris for both F3 and F2, Hewland Mk.IV	John Ampt (Note: as Formula 3); Allan Taylor
1965	Mk.7	Formula 2	Cosworth SCA	Converted Mk.6. Paul Hawkins won Eifelrennen	Paul Hawkins
1965	Mk.8	Formula 3	Holbay-tuned MAE	Shorter spaceframe version of Mk.6, new uprights, Hewland Mk.VI. 10th (Smith) at Halle, 4th (Maglia) and 7th (Blokdyk) at Monza	George Smith
1965	Mk.8	Formula 3	Alexis-tuned MAE	Shorter spaceframe version of Mk.6, new uprights, Hewland Mk.VI. 10th (Smith) at Halle, 4th (Maglia) and 7th (Blokdyk) at Monza	Jacques Maglia; Trevor Blokdyk
1966	Mk.9	Formula 3	Alexis-tuned MAE	Designed by Allan Taylor, Hewland Mk.VI. 13th (Ogilvie-Hardy) at Brands Hatch	Terry Ogilvie-Hardy
1967	Mk.10	Formula Ford	Ford Pre-Crossflow	Designed by Allan Taylor, Hewland Mk.VI. Formula Ford proof of concept for John Webb, the founder of Formula Ford	
1967	Mk.11	Formula Ford	Ford Crossflow	Bourgoignie won the first Formula Ford championship in England. Walker won Scottish Championship	Claude Bourgoignie (Note: https://www.driverdb.com/drivers/claude-bourgoignie); Dave Walker
1967	Mk.12	Formula 3	Novamotor (Note: https://www.novamotor.it)-tuned MAE	Hewland Mk.VI, 7th (Ogilvie-Hardy) at non-championship Chimay	Terry Ogilvie-Hardy
1967	Mk.12	Formula 3	Alexis-tuned MAE	Hewland Mk.VI	Ken Crook
1968	Mk.14	Formula Ford	Ford Crossflow	About 60 examples named "Russell-Alexis" for Jim Russell Driving Development School at Snetterton	
1968	Mk.15	Formula Ford	Ford Crossflow	About 70 units sold	
1969-1970	Mk.17	Formula 3	Alexis-tuned MAE	Hewland Mk.VI	Ken Crook
1969-1970	Mk.17	Formula 3	Holbay-tuned MAE	Hewland Mk.VI	Ken Bailey
1969-1970	Mk.18	Formula 3	MAE various tuners	50 cars sold. Hewland Mk.VI	
1969-1970	Mk.18	Formula Ford	1.6L Ford Crossflow	24 units sold. Hewland Mk.VI	
1969-1970	Mk.19	F100 (Note: Unsuccessful attempt at creating an enclosed open body sports car series with 1.3L Ford Crossflow.)	1.3L Ford Crossflow	2 cars sold. Hewland Mk.VI	
1971	Mk.20	Formula 3	Vegantune (Note: https://www.totalkitcar.com/2023/05/25/the-story-of-george-robinsons-vegantune-vta-twin-cam/)-tuned MAE	Tubular monocoque. Side radiators. Hewland Mk.VI	
1971	Mk.20	Formula B	Cosworth BDD	Tubular monocoque. Side radiators. Hewland FT200	
1971	Mk.20	Formula Atlantic	Cosworth BDD	Tubular monocoque. Side radiators. Hewland FT200	
