= Peter Procter =

British cyclist and rally driver (1930–2024)

Peter Roderick Procter (16 January 1930 – 15 August 2024) was a British cycling champion, rally driver and racing driver.

== Life and career ==
Procter was born on 16 January 1930. Shortly after his birth he moved to Harrogate, and then to Alne Hall in the village of Alne, near York. Following the premature death of his parents, he moved back to Bradford, where he took up cycling. Procter competed in all types of cycle racing at home and on the Continent, but excelled in hill climbs, winning the British championship in 1951.

After becoming disillusioned with UK cycling, and after the British Olympic Committee failed to select both him and other top cyclists of the time to represent Great Britain in the Olympics, Procter dropped out of professional cycling to concentrate on his building company in Bradford. He was soon involved in rallying. He competed in events including the RAC Rally, Tulip Rally, Coupe des Alpes (Alpine Rally), Tour de France Automobile and Monte Carlo Rally. Procter also competed in the Le Mans 24 Heures race several times, and raced in many Grands Prix, his highest position second in the Berlin Grand Prix.

Procter's racing career ended in 1966 when he was hit from behind in a saloon car race at Goodwood. After several somersaults, the car burst into flames and Procter was left with third degree burns to 65 per cent of his skin. After many months of treatment and operations, he left hospital and returned home to Yorkshire, where he lived with his wife and family.

Procter returned to driving a few times, including racing his original Sunbeam Tiger at the Le Mans Historic in 2002, and remained involved in motorsport, as a member of the British Racing Drivers Club at Silverstone.

Procter died on 15 August 2024, at the age of 94.
