= Ferrari P =

Series of prototype sports racing cars produced by Ferrari

The Ferrari P (Posteriore) was a series of V12 rear mid-engined two seat Group 6 sports prototype racing car models produced by Ferrari from 1963 to 1973, to be raced mainly by the factory Scuderia Ferrari racing team. When a double digit number of identical cars was planned for Group 4 Sportscar homologation and sale to customers, the codes LM (Le Mans as in 250LM) or S (Sportscar, as in Dino 206S and 512S) were used instead.

Although Enzo Ferrari witnessed the rear mid-engined Auto Union racing cars of the 1930s, and with Cooper dominating F1 with back-to-back World Championship wins, 1959 and 1960, he resisted to move his V12 engines behind the driver. This even after Scuderia Ferrari put the Dino V6 engine in the rear of a single-seater, resulting in the Ferrari 246 P and the Ferrari 156 F1 "shark nose" that won the 1961 Formula One season.

The Dino V6 with 2.0 or 2.4 litres was also used in the first rear mid-engined Ferrari sport prototypes of the Ferrari SP series of 1961–1962. The 3 litres-plus V12 sports car racers followed in 1963, starting the P series. Although these cars shared their numerical designations (based on engine displacement) with road models, they were almost entirely different.

The production racers Ferrari 250 LM of 1964 and Ferrari Dino 206S of 1966 were intended for homologation in Groups 3 or 4, but Ferrari did built too few and homologation was denied, or in case of the 250LM, delayed by years. They could be made road legal, to be run with Prova plates, or as 'Stradale' for sale to customers in various countries. The first Ferrari mid-engine in a proper road car did not arrive until the 1967 Dino 206 GT, and it was 1971 when a road-going Ferrari 12-cylinder engine was placed behind the driver in the 365 GT4 BB, with V12 front engine GT 2+2 models never been discontinued.

== 250 P ==
Ferrari 250P
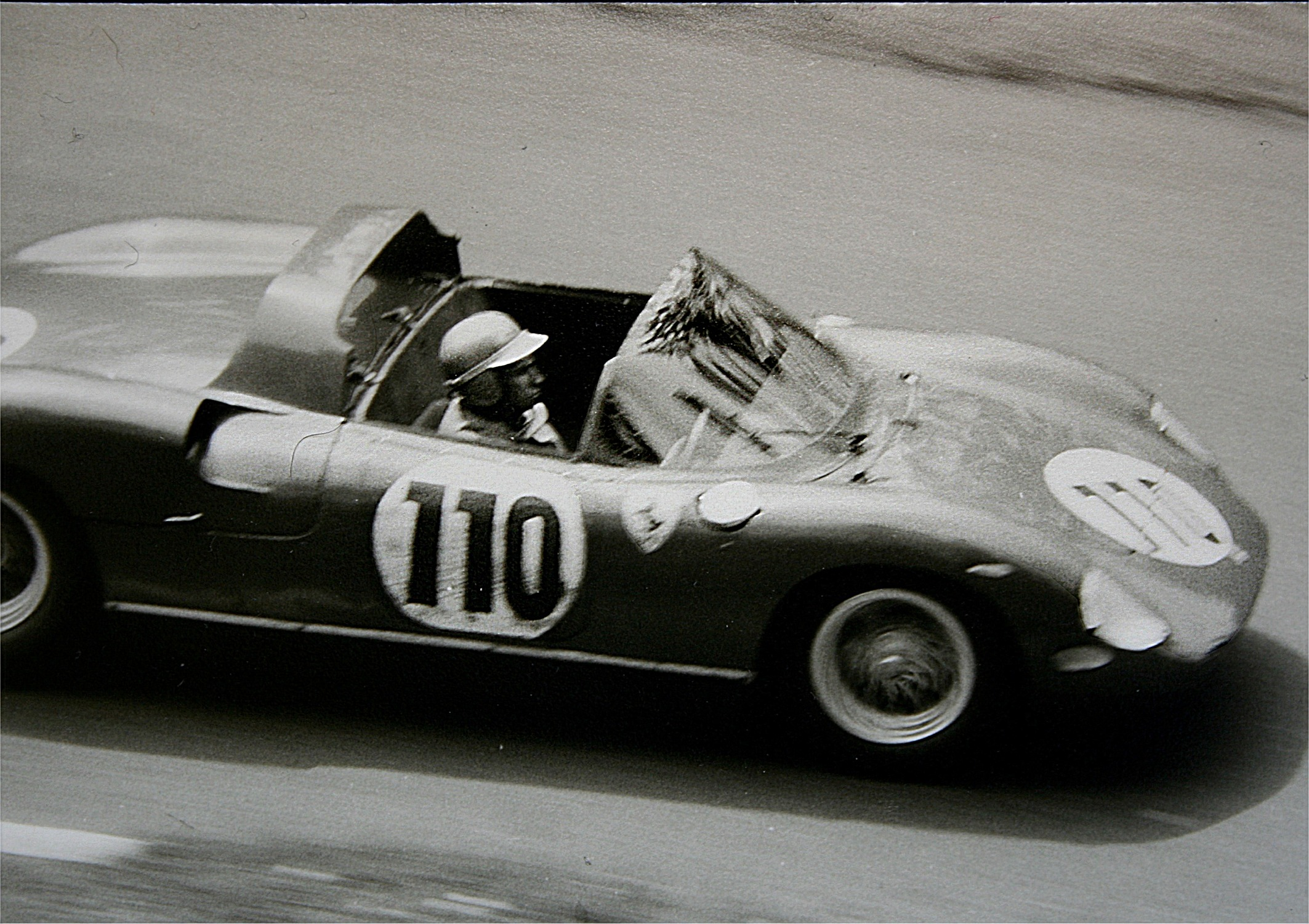
- The Willy Mairesse / John Surtees Ferrari 250 P heading for victory at the 1963 1000 km Nürburgring
- Category: World Sportscar Championship
- Designer: Mauro Forghieri
- Production: 4

Technical specifications
- Chassis: Tubular chassis
- Suspension: Double wishbone suspension
- Length: 158.1 inches (4,020 mm)
- Width: 65.8 inches (1,670 mm)
- Height: 42.5 inches (1,080 mm)
- Axle track: 53.2 inches (1,350 mm) (Front); 52.8 inches (1,340 mm) (Rear)
- Wheelbase: 94.5 inches (2,400 mm)
- Engine: Colombo V12 2,953.1 cubic centimetres (180.21 cu in; 2.9531 L) mid engine, RWD longitudinal
- Transmission: 5-speed manual
- Power: 228 kW (306 bhp; 310 PS) at 7,500 rpm 435.2 N⋅m (321.0 lbf⋅ft) at 5,500 rpm
- Weight: 820 kg (1,810 lb)

Competition history
- Notable drivers: Willy Mairesse; John Surtees; Ludovico Scarfiotti; Mike Parkes; Pedro Rodríguez; Lorenzo Bandini; Nino Vaccarella; Umberto Maglioli; Chuck Parsons
Entries	Races	Wins	Podiums	Poles
19	12	4	4	3

Ferrari produced a few of the V12 rear-engine 250 P in 1963 in response to the FIA introducing a prototype class for the upcoming season of the World Sportscar Championship. This was a new design, with a chassis unrelated to existing V12 3 litre front engine 250 GT-series Grand Touring cars that culminated in the Ferrari 250 GTO that were made and sold by the dozens. Designed by Mauro Forghieri, the 250 P was an open cockpit mid-engined rear wheel drive design, utilizing a tubular space-frame chassis, double wishbone suspension, rack and pinion steering, four wheel disc brakes and a longitudinally-mounted V12 engine with a 5-speed gearbox and transaxle. The 250 Testa Rossa-type single-cam 3.0-litre engine was supplied by six Weber 38 DCN carburetors and produced 310 bhp at 7,500 rpm. This was the first time a V12 engine was mounted in the rear of a Ferrari sports racing car.

The 250 P achieved immediate success on the racetrack, winning the 1963 24 Hours of Le Mans, 12 Hours of Sebring, 1000 km Nürburgring, and Canadian Grand Prix. The cars were raced by Scuderia Ferrari in Europe and NART in the Americas. Notable drivers included John Surtees, Ludovico Scarfiotti, Willy Mairesse, Lorenzo Bandini and Pedro Rodriguez.

In total Ferrari produced four 250 P chassis (serial numbers 0810, 0812, 0814 and 0816) and one development mule based on a Ferrari 246 SP chassis (number 0796). All 250 P chassis were converted to 275 P or 330 P specification following the 1963 racing season.

=== 275 P and 330 P ===
Ferrari 275P Ferrari 330P
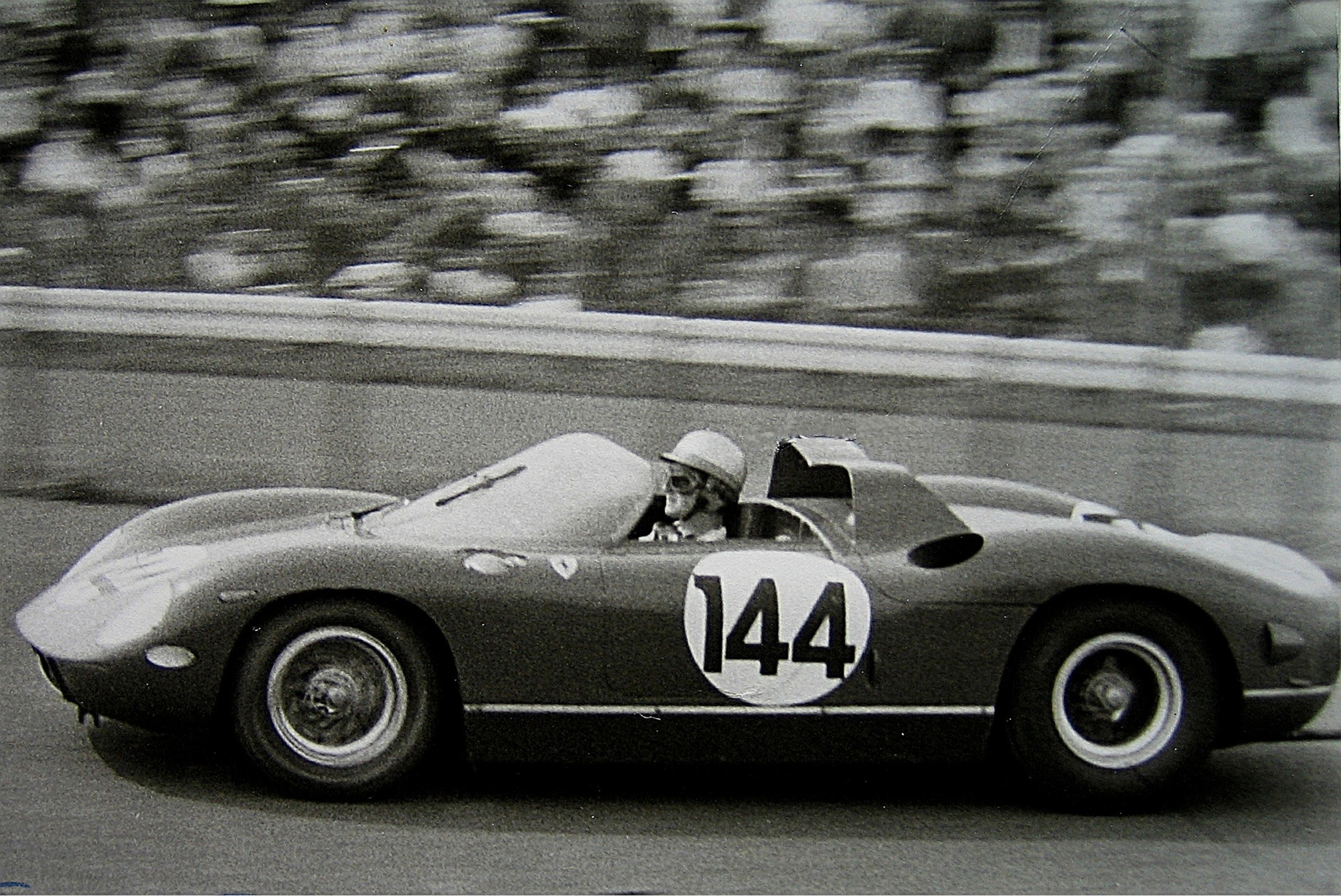
- A 275P driven by Ludovico Scarfiotti at the 1964 1000 km Nürburgring
- Category: World Sportscar Championship
- Production: 6 total, (3 275P and 3 330P)

Technical specifications
- Chassis: Tubular chassis
- Suspension: Double wishbone suspension
- Length: 4,160 millimetres (164 in)
- Width: 1,675 millimetres (65.9 in)
- Height: 1,055 millimetres (41.5 in)
- Axle track: 1,350 millimetres (53 in) (Front); 1,340 millimetres (53 in) (Rear)
- Wheelbase: 2,400 millimetres (94 in)
- Engine: Colombo V12 3,285.72 cubic centimetres (200.507 cu in; 3.28572 L) (275P) 3,967.44 cubic centimetres (242.108 cu in; 3.96744 L) (330P) Mid Engine, RWD Longitudinal
- Transmission: 5-Speed + 1 Reverse Manual
- Power: 275P; 235 kW (315 bhp; 320 PS) at 7,700 rpm 435 N⋅m (321 lb⋅ft) at 5,500 rpm 330P; 272 kW (365 bhp; 370 PS) at 7,200 rpm 450 N⋅m (332 lb⋅ft) at 5,000 rpm
- Weight: 275P; 755 kilograms (1,664 lb); 330P; 785 kilograms (1,731 lb)

Competition history
- Notable drivers: William Cooper; Ludovico Scarfiotti; Umberto Maglioli; Nino Vaccarella; Pedro Rodriguez; Mike Parkes; Giancarlo Baghetti; Tom O'Brien; Walt Hansgen; John Surtees; Graham Hill; Jo Bonnier; Bob Grossman; John Fulp; Skip Hudson; David Piper; Lorenzo Bandini; Gordon Tatum
Entries	Races	Wins	Podiums
61	45	10	14

For the 1964 season, Ferrari developed the 275 P and 330 P. These were improved versions of the 250 P with larger displacement engines and slightly modified bodywork. The tubular space-frame chassis and most other components remained the same as in the 250 P. The 275 P used a bored-out 3.3L version of the 250 Testa Rossa-type engine originally utilized by the 250 P. The 330 P used a different design, a 4.0L Colombo-designed V12 based on engines used in the 400 Superamerica road cars. The 330 P developed more power than the 275 P (370 bhp vs 320 bhp) but weighed more (785 kg vs 755 kg). Some drivers preferred the extra power of the 330 P while others appreciated the more nimble feel of the 275 P and the two models were raced concurrently. Production of these types included three brand new chassis and conversions of all four 250 P chassis. It is not possible to clearly determine the number of chassis produced with each engine type as 275 and 330 engines were swapped as needed between cars. 275 P and 330 P cars were actively and successfully raced by Scuderia Ferrari, NART and Maranello Concessionaires during 1964 and 1965 seasons. The most notable result was a 1-2-3 sweep at the 1964 24 Hours of Le Mans. The Scuderia Ferrari-run 275 P driven by Guichet and Vaccarella took first, followed by a Maranello Concessionaires 330 P (Hill/Bonnier) in second and a Scuderia Ferrari 330 P (Bandini/Surtees) in third.

275 P at the Museo Casa Enzo Ferrari

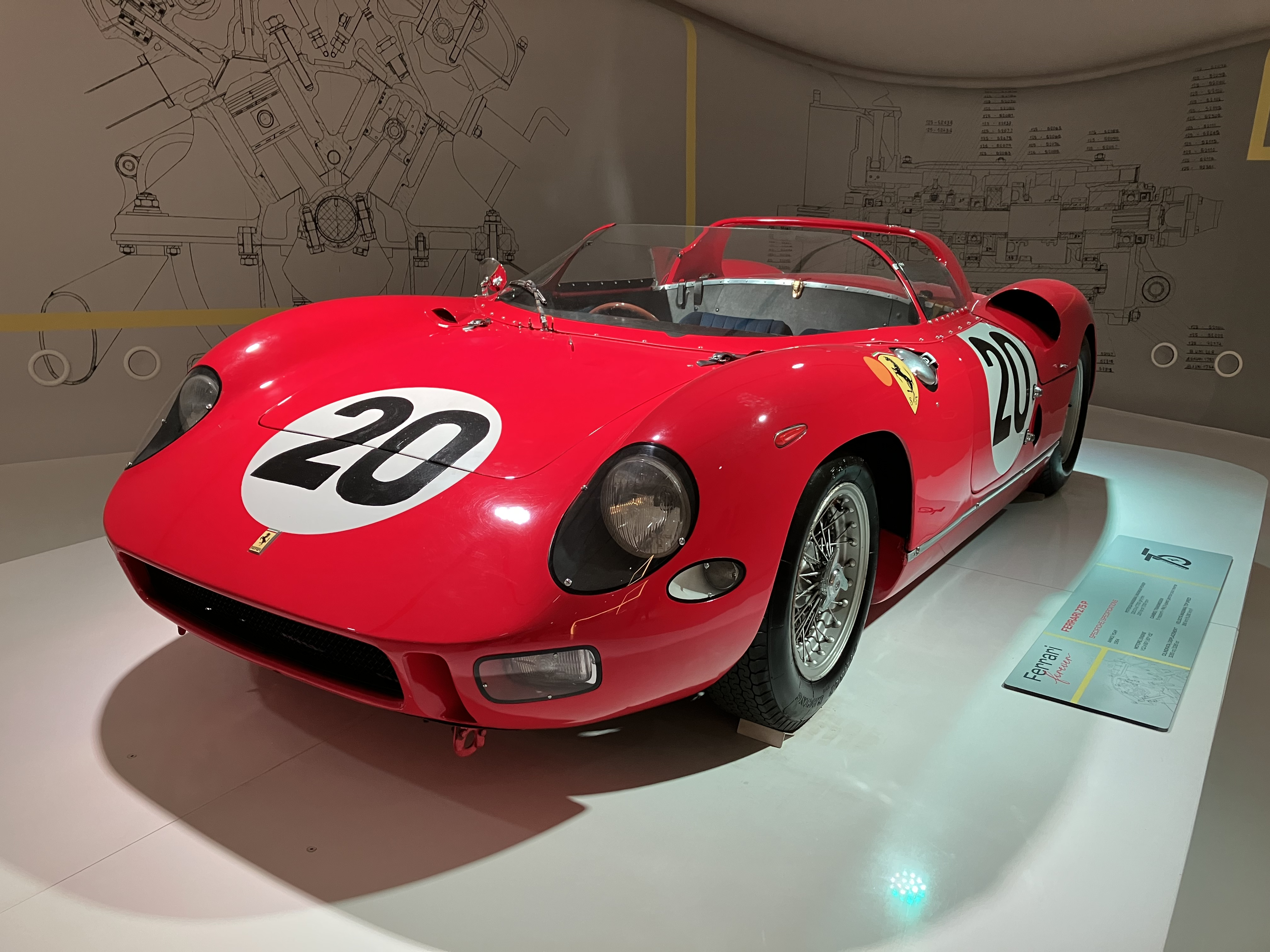

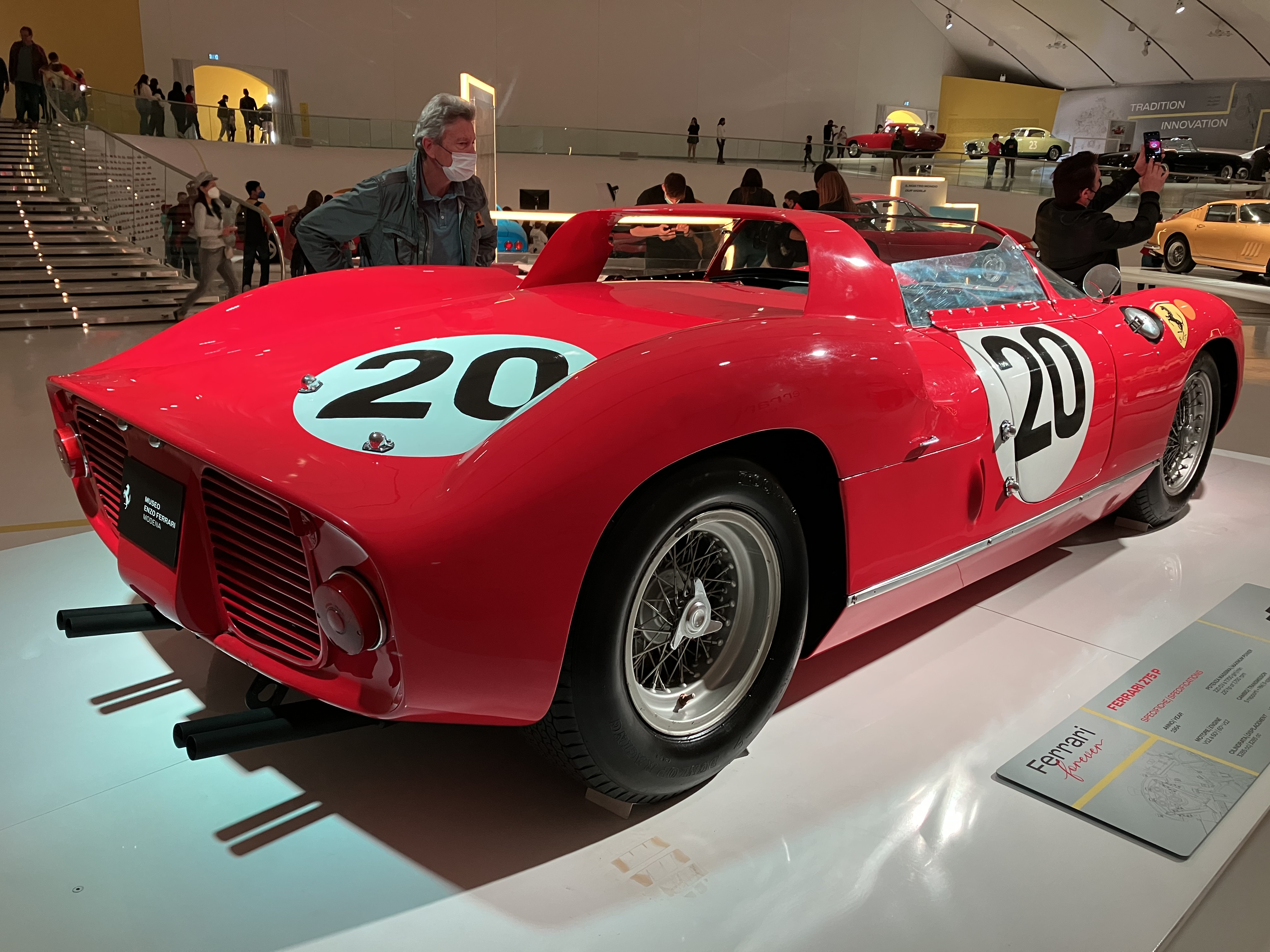

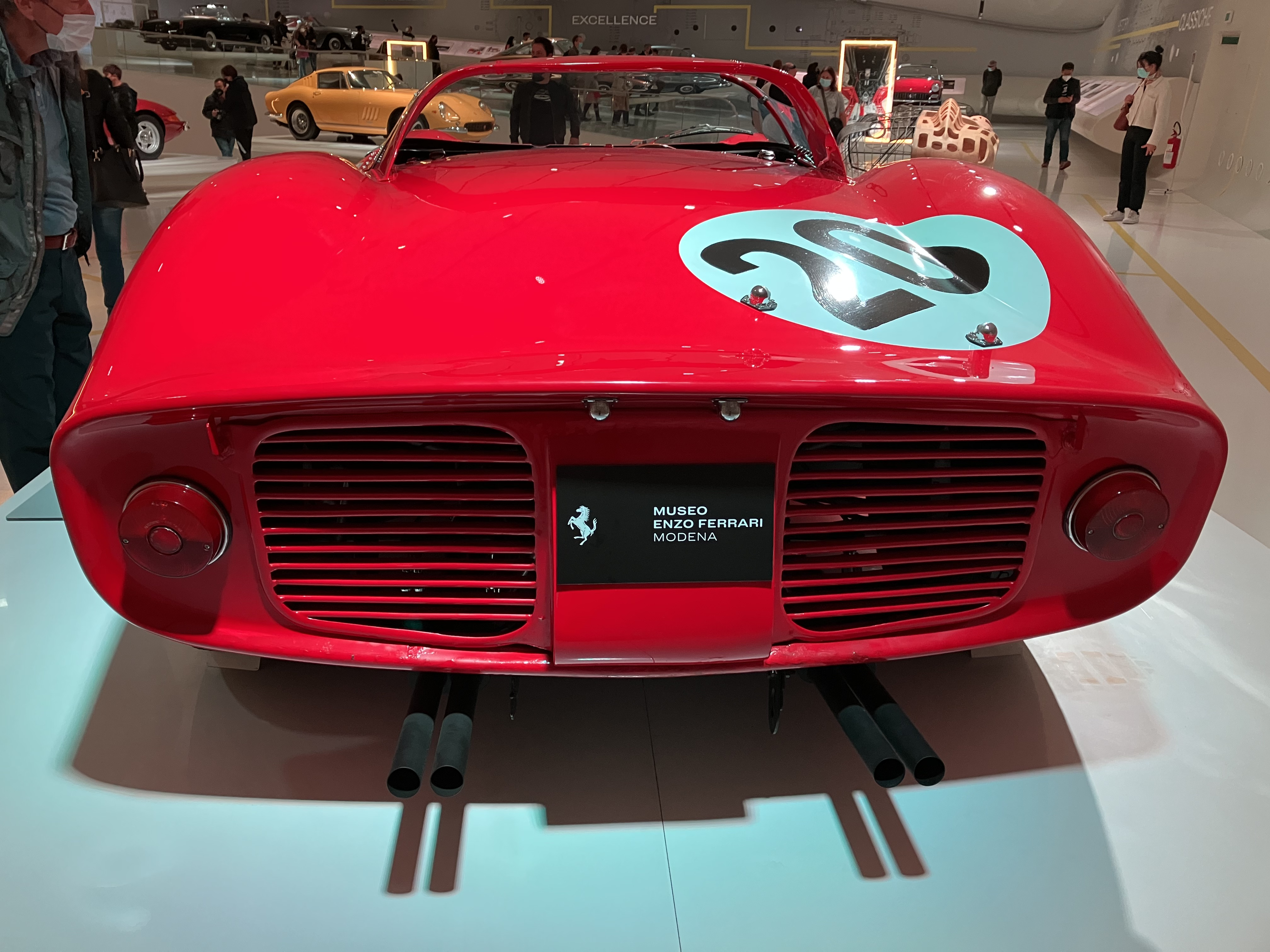

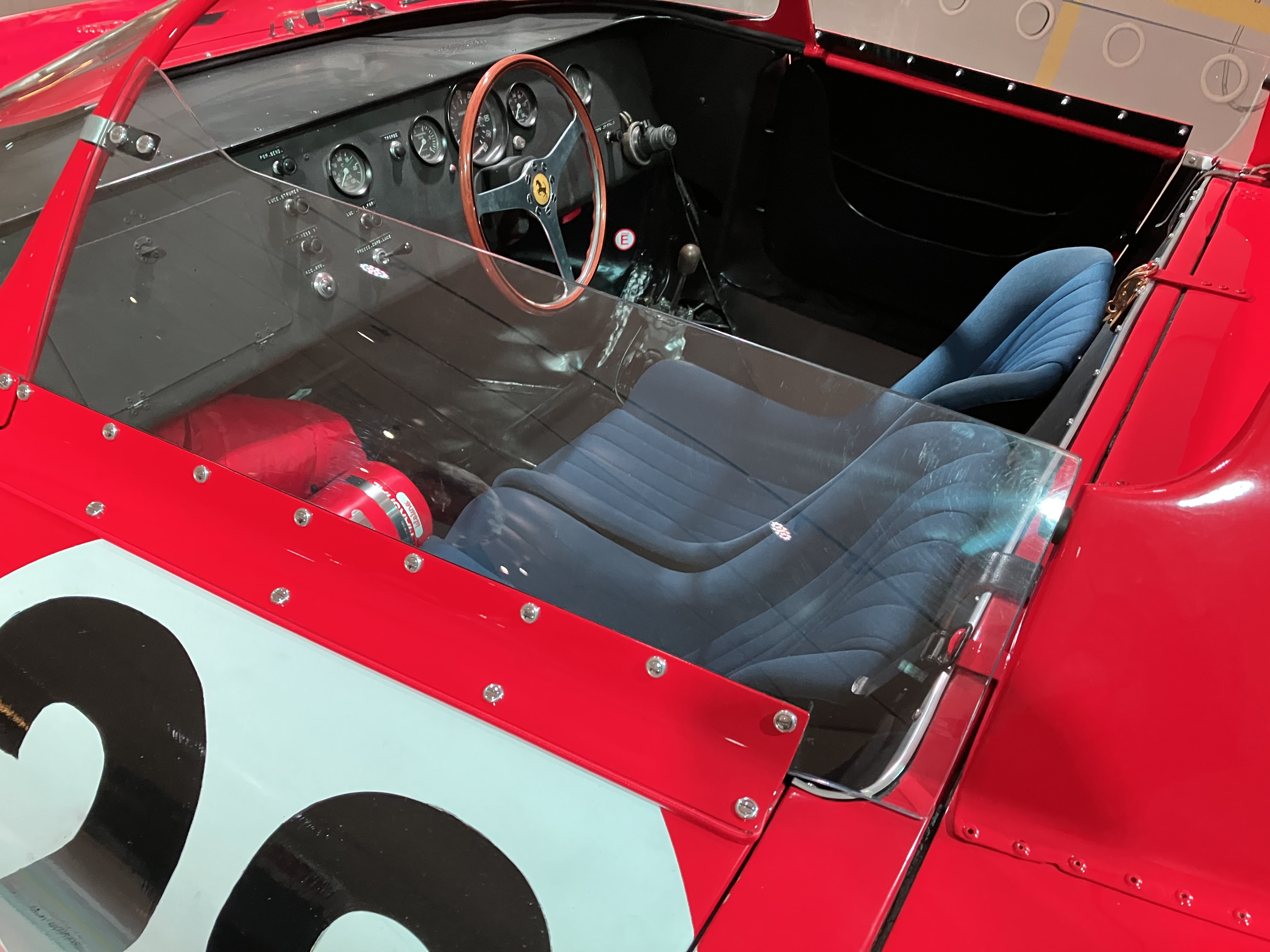

=== Racing Results ===
(key)

Year	Entrant	Chassis	(United States) SEB	(Italy) TGA	(Germany) NÜR	(France) LMS
1963	(Italy) S.E.F.A.C.	0810	1	Ret	Ret	3
1963	(Italy) S.E.F.A.C.	0812	2	Ret	1	Ret
1963	(Italy) S.E.F.A.C.	0814			DNS	
1963	(Italy) S.E.F.A.C.	0816				1
1964	(Italy) S.E.F.A.C.	0812	2			Ret
1964	(Italy) S.E.F.A.C.	0816	1			1
1964	(Italy) S.E.F.A.C.	0820			1	Ret
1964	(Italy) S.E.F.A.C.	0822	3		Ret	3
1964	(United States) N.A.R.T.	0810	Ret			Ret
1964	(United Kingdom) Maranello Concessionaires	0818	Ret		DSQ	2

=== 250 LM ===
Ferrari 250 LM
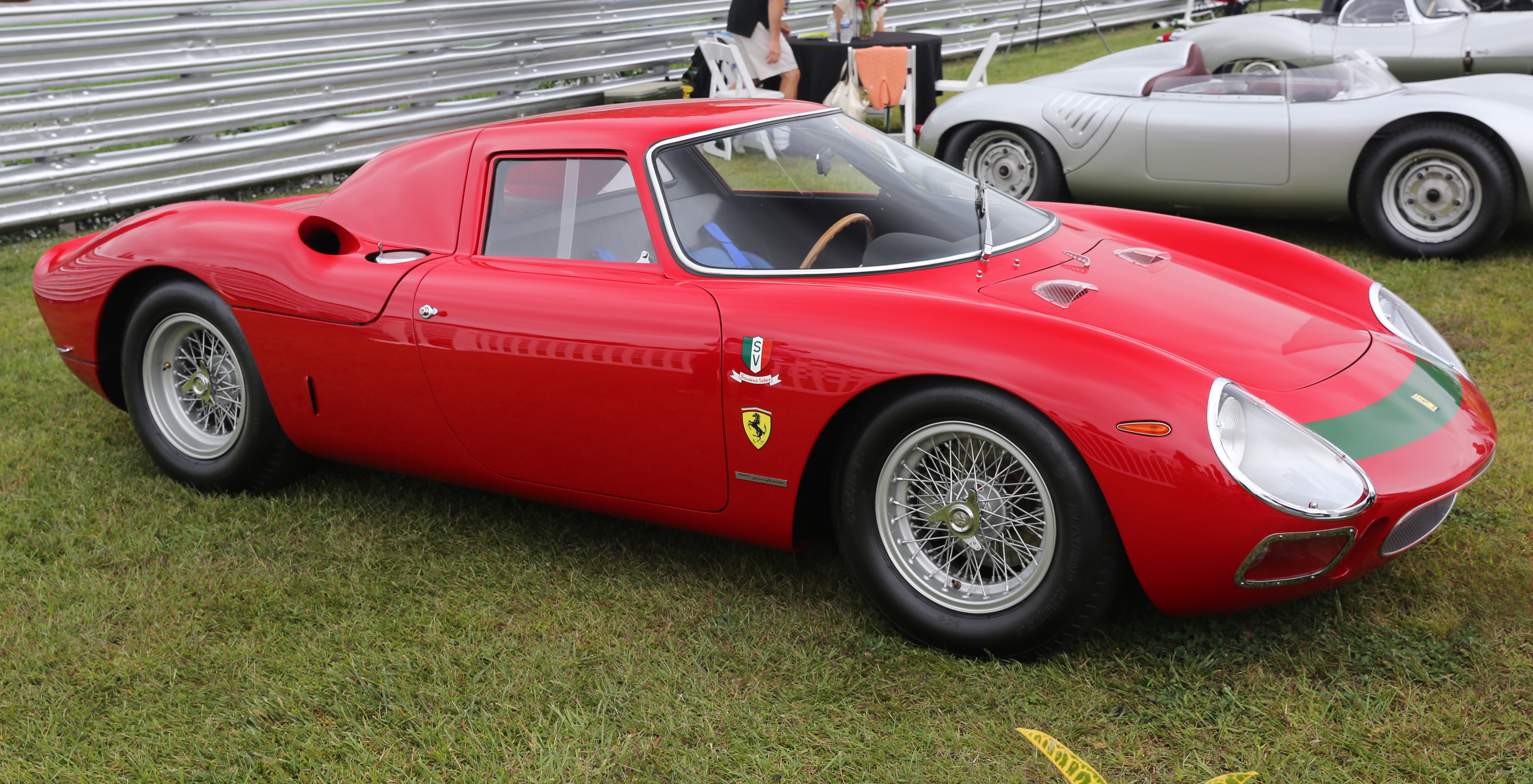
- 1964 Ferrari 250 LM (chassis 6321) owned by Ralph Lauren at the 2014 Lime Rock Concours d'Élegance
- Category: Group 4
- Designer: Aldo Brovarone
- Production: 32 (1963-1966)

Technical specifications
- Chassis: Tubular chassis
- Suspension: Double wishbone suspension
- Length: 4,270 millimetres (168 in)
- Width: 1,700 millimetres (67 in)
- Height: 1,150 millimetres (45 in)
- Axle track: 1,350 millimetres (53 in) (Front); 1,340 millimetres (53 in) (Rear)
- Wheelbase: 2,400 millimetres (94 in)
- Engine: Colombo V12 3,285.72 cubic centimetres (200.507 cu in; 3.28572 L) Mid Engine, RWD Longitudinal
- Transmission: 5-Speed + 1 Reverse Manual
- Power: 320 bhp (324 PS; 239 kW) at 7,500 rpm 294 N⋅m (217 lb⋅ft) at 5,500 rpm
- Weight: 850 kilograms (1,870 lb)

Competition history
- Notable drivers: David Piper; Peter Clarke; Rollo Fielding; Jeff Edmonds; Ron Fry; David Prophet; George Drummond; David Skailes; Richard Attwood; Sylvain Garant; Bob Grossman; Heini Walter; Jackie Epstein
Entries	Races	Wins	Podiums	Poles
383	211	69	91	11

At the November 1963 Paris Auto Show, Ferrari introduced the Ferrari 250 LM (Le Mans). It was developed as a coupé version of the 250 P and was ostensibly a new production car intended to meet FIA homologation requirements for the Group 3 GT class, 100 cars. The intention was for the mid-engine 250 LM to replace the aging front-engine 250 GTO as Ferrari's premier GT-class racer for customers. However, in April 1964 the FIA refused to homologate the model, as Ferrari had built considerably fewer than the required 100 units, and no similar earlier models to count in as with the GTO. The 250 LM thus had to run in the prototype class until it was homologated in late 1965 as a Group 4 Sports Car (minimum 50 units in 12 months) for the 1966 season.

32 total 250 LM chassis were built from 1963 to 1965, with all but the first chassis (s/n 5149, the Paris Auto Show car with a 250 P engine) powered by 3.3-litre 320 bhp (238 kW) engines as used in the 275 P. According to Ferrari naming convention, the 3.3 litre cars should have been designated "275 LM", however Enzo Ferrari insisted that the name remain 250 LM in order to facilitate the homologation process. The 250 LM shared fully independent double wishbone suspension, rack and pinion steering, four wheel disc brakes and 5-speed transaxle with the 250 P, however the tubular space frame chassis was significantly strengthened with the roof structure, additional cross-bracing and heavier gauge tubing. The interior was trimmed out as a nod to the ostensible production status of the car, but ultimately it was little different from a prototype racer.

The 250 LM was successfully raced around the world by both factory-supported and privateer racers. Unlike the 250/275/330 P cars, new 250 LMs were sold to private customers and campaigned by privateer teams. From 1964 through 1967, 250 LMs were raced by Scuderia Ferrari, NART, Maranello Concessionaires, Ecurie Filipinetti, Ecurie Francorchamps and others, even when this model was no longer competitive with the latest factory prototypes. Notably, a 250 LM (chassis 5893) entered by the North American Racing Team won the 1965 24 Hours of Le Mans driven by Jochen Rindt and Masten Gregory. This would be Ferrari's last overall victory in the endurance classic until the Ferrari 499P won the 2023 race. This car is now owned by the Indianapolis Motor Speedway Museum and was displayed at the 2004 Pebble Beach Concours d'Elegance and the 2013 Amelia Island Concours d'Elegance.

The 250 LM is highly sought after by serious auto collectors and individual cars are often featured at auctions, car shows and historic racing events. 250 LMs typically sell for more than US$10 million and auction records for this model have been repeatedly broken in the past 10 years.

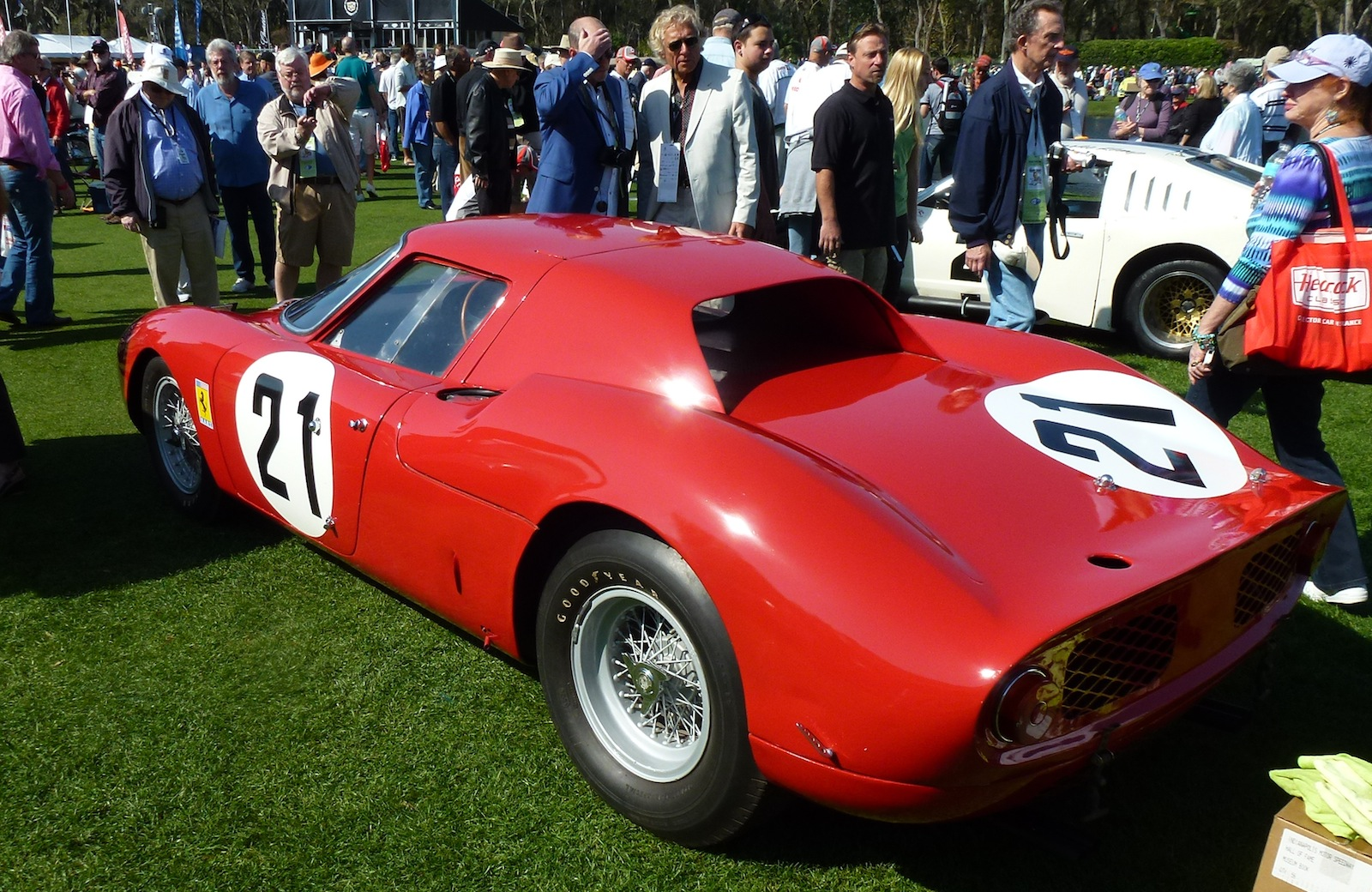
Ferrari 250 LM (chassis 5893), the last Ferrari to win the 24 Hours of Le Mans until 2023, on display at Amelia Island in 2013

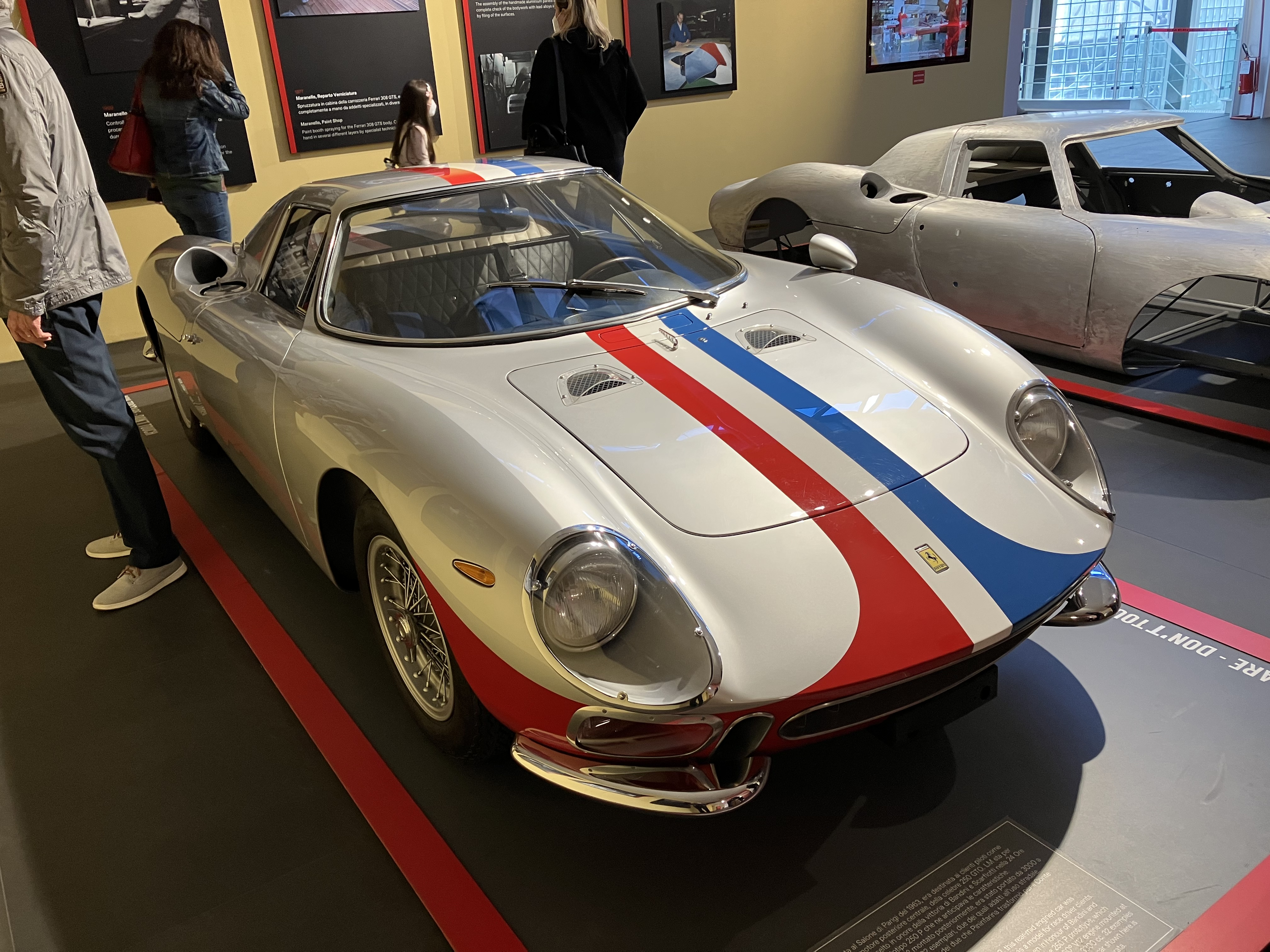
250 LM 'Stradale' at the Museo Ferrari

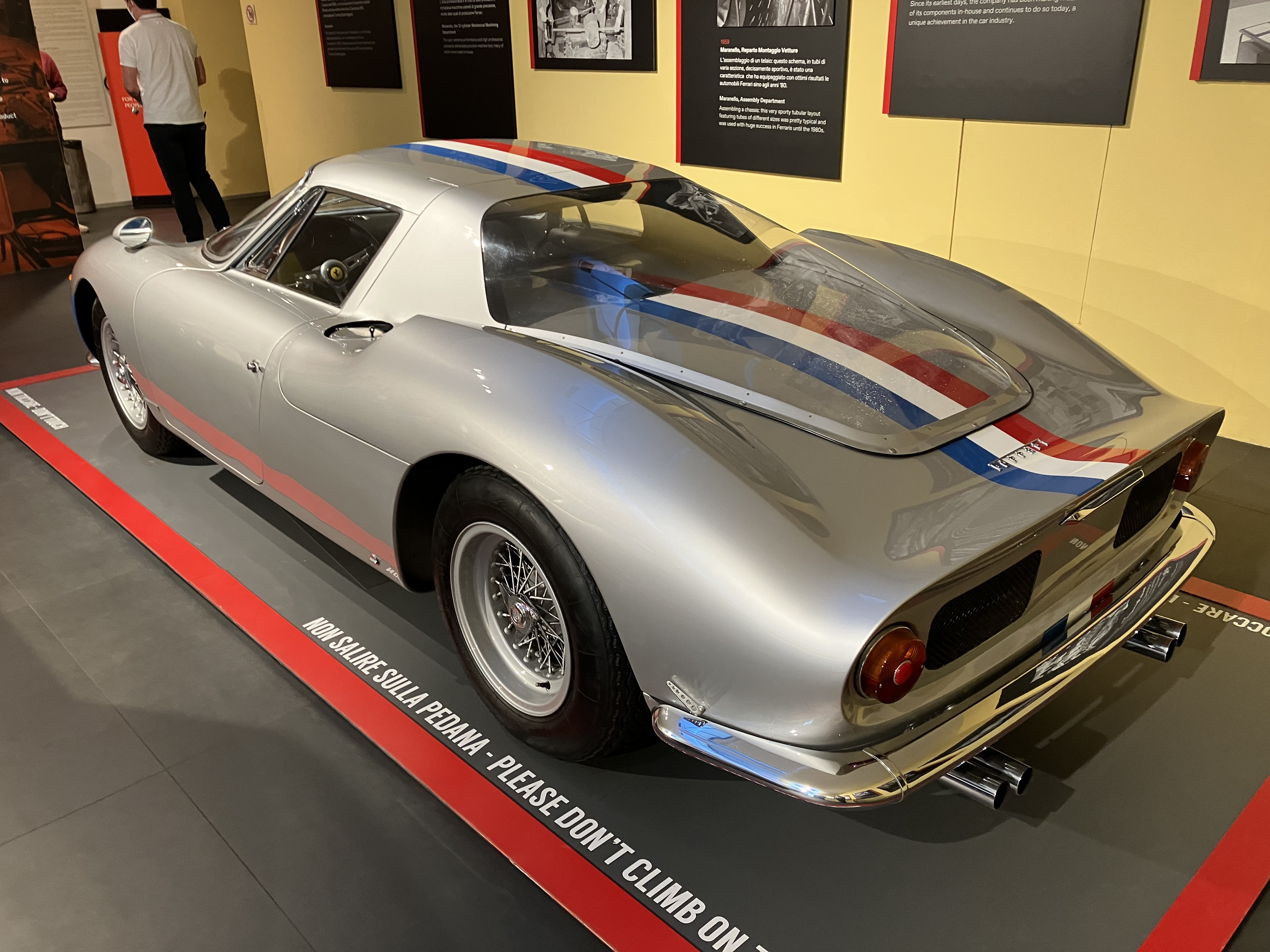
Note the elongated rear window on this specific car

== 275 P2 and 330 P2 ==
Two entirely new cars, the 275 P2 and 330 P2, followed in 1965. Featuring lower and lighter chassis and more aerodynamic body, the cars were paired with revamped versions of the previous 275 and 330 V12, now equipped with four camshafts and producing 350 hp and 410 hp, respectively. The 330 P2 was first used by Luigi Chinetti's North American Racing Team (NART) in the Daytona race that year. In 1965 275 P2 0836 won the 1000 km of Monza, 275 P2 0828 won the Targa Florio, 330 P2 0828 won the Nurburgring 1000 km, and 365 P2 0836 or 0838 won the 12 hr. Reims. The P2 cars were replaced by the P3 for 1966.

=== 275 P2 ===
Ferrari 275P2
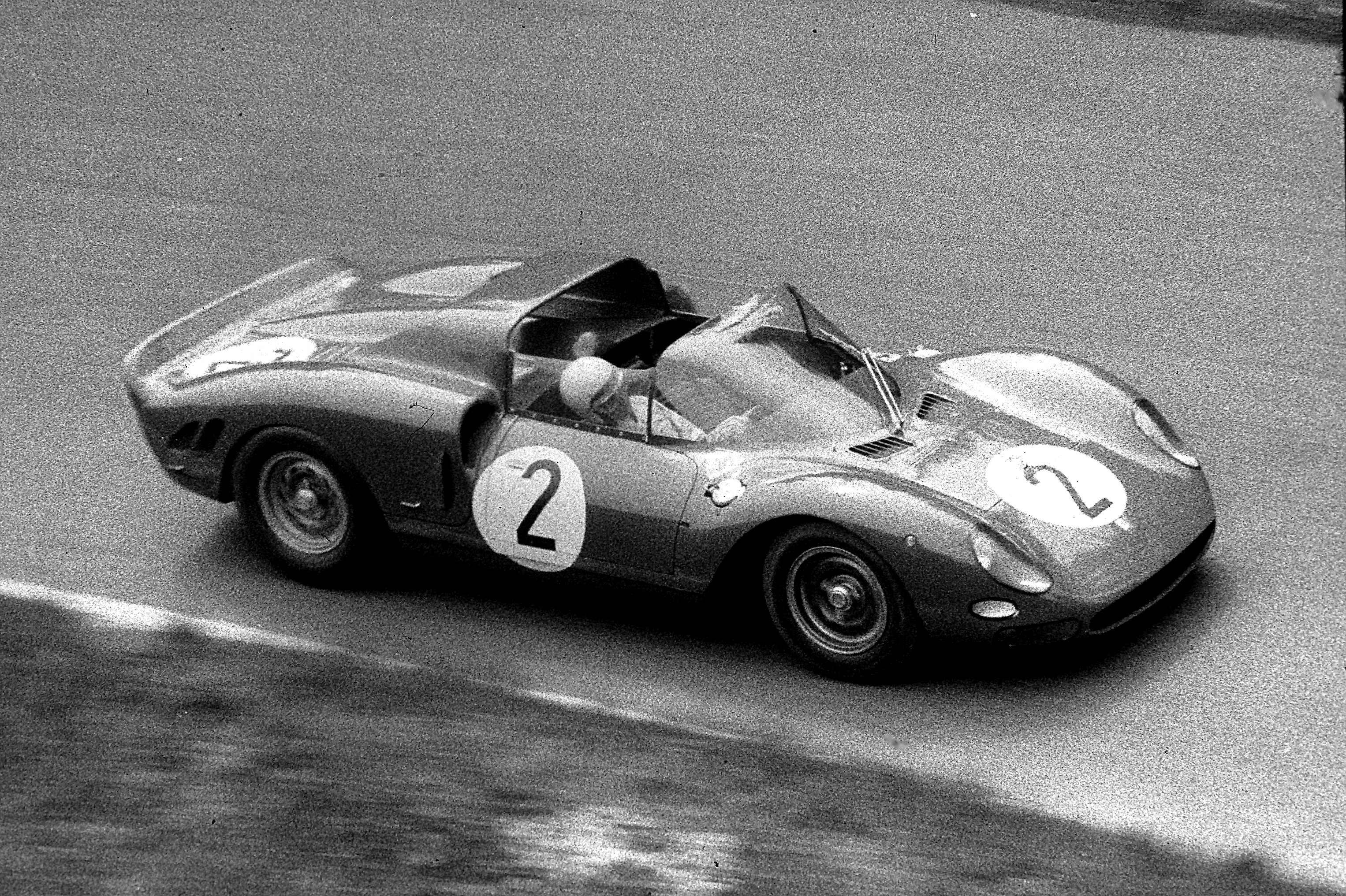
- A 275 P2 driven by Jean Guichet at the 1965 1000 km Nürburgring
- Production: 3 (1 Converted to 365P2)

Technical specifications
- Chassis: Tubular chassis
- Suspension: Ferrari 158 Double wishbone suspension
- Length: 4,260 millimetres (168 in)
- Width: 1,675 millimetres (65.9 in)
- Height: 1,040 millimetres (41 in)
- Axle track: 1,400 millimetres (55 in) (Front); 1,370 millimetres (54 in) (Rear)
- Wheelbase: 2,400 millimetres (94 in)
- Engine: Colombo V12 3,285.72 cubic centimetres (200.507 cu in; 3.28572 L) Mid Engine, RWD Longitudinal
- Transmission: 5-speed + 1 reverse Manual
- Power: 257 kW (345 bhp; 349 PS) at 8,500 rpm 334 N⋅m (246 lb⋅ft)
- Weight: 790 kilograms (1,740 lb)

Competition history
- Notable drivers: Jean Guichet; Mike Parkes; Lorenzo Bandini; Giampiero Biscaldi; Giancarlo Baghetti; Antonio Finiguerra; Jackie Stewart; Ludovico Scarfiotti; Giorgio Pianta; Nino Vaccarella; Graham Hill
Entries	Races	Wins	Podiums	Poles
10	7	3	4	2

In many publications, the 275 P2 is equated with the Ferrari 330 P2, a circumstance that is avoided here with good reason. This separation is carried out in all result lists of international sports car races, since the two types of car differ significantly in terms of engine performance, triggered by the displacement size of the 12-cylinder engine.

The 275 P2 no longer had a classic space frame. As practiced from 1963 with the Ferrari Formula 1 monoposto racing car, a self-supporting body made of riveted aluminium sheets was manufactured by Carrozzeria Fantuzzi. The rear suspension was carried over from the Formula 1 Ferrari 158. Unlike the previous 275 model, the 275 P2 had wider rims and tubeless Dunlop racing tyres. Power was transmitted via a newly developed 5-speed gearbox.

The 275 P2 received a new V12 engine with four overhead camshafts. The engine had six twin Weber carburetors and two spark plugs per cylinder. While the displacement of the 330 P2 was 4 liters, this type had the 3.3-liter variant. The specified engine output was 350 hp @ 7200 rpm.

The 275 P2 made its track debut in April 1965 on the test day of the 24 Hours of Le Mans. The first race was two weeks later at the 1000 km race in Monza, which ended with a victory for the driver pairing Mike Parkes/Jean Guichet. The next victory followed two weeks later; Nino Vaccarella and Lorenzo Bandini won the Targa Florio.

At the 1000 km race at the Nürburgring, Parkes and Guichet were beaten only by teammates John Surtees and Ludovico Scarfiotti in the more powerful 330 P2. The last time a 275 P2 was used, was in August 1965, when Giampiero Biscaldi finished third in the Ollon-Villars Hillclimb.

=== 330 P2 ===
Ferrari 330P2
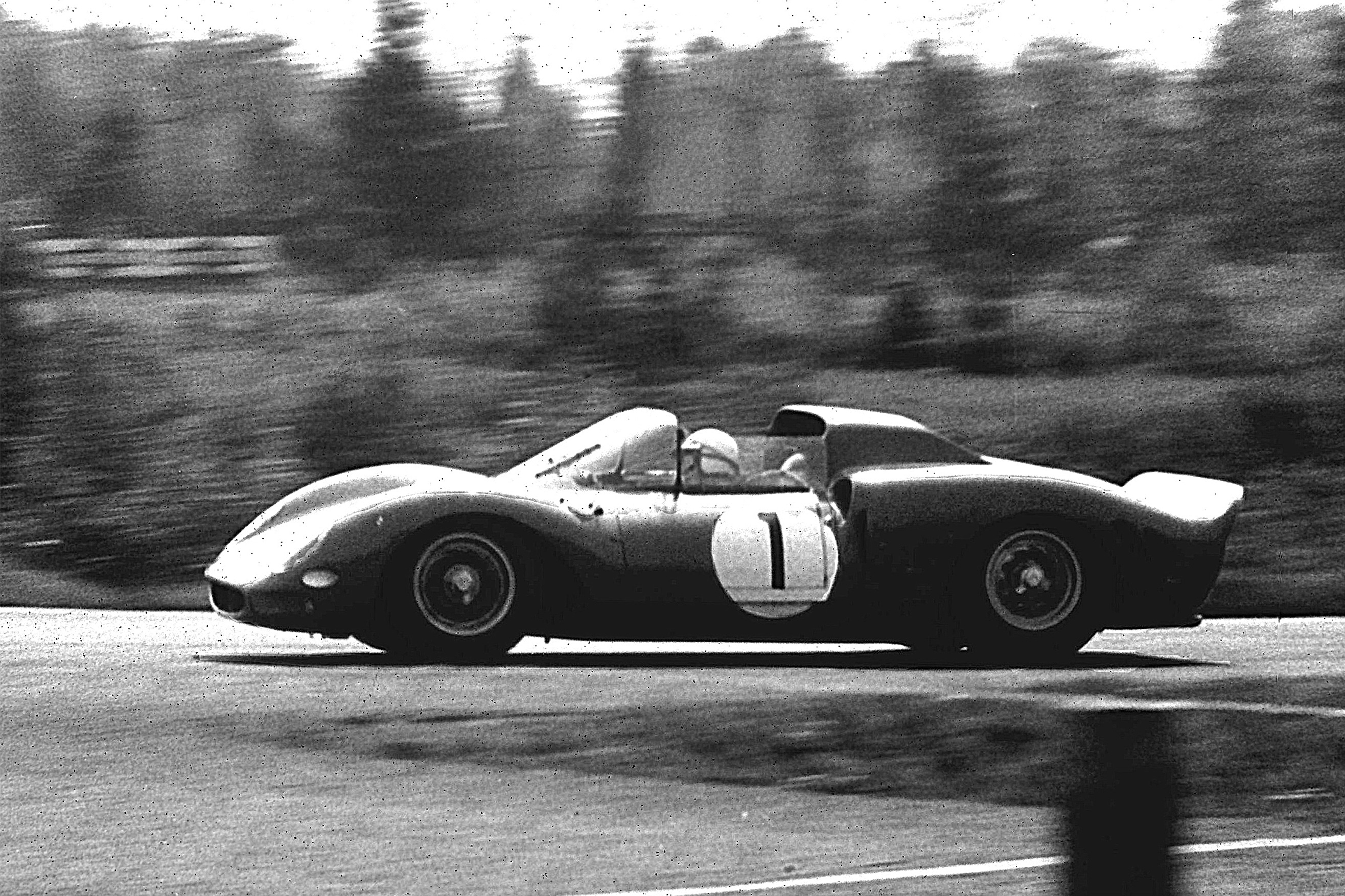
- A 330 P2 driven by John Surtees at the 1965 1000 km Nürburgring
- Production: 5

Technical specifications
- Chassis: Tubular chassis
- Suspension: Ferrari 158 Double wishbone suspension
- Length: 4,260 millimetres (168 in)
- Width: 1,675 millimetres (65.9 in)
- Height: 1,040 millimetres (41 in)
- Axle track: 1,400 millimetres (55 in) (Front); 1,370 millimetres (54 in) (Rear)
- Wheelbase: 2,400 millimetres (94 in)
- Engine: Colombo V12 3,967.44 cubic centimetres (242.108 cu in; 3.96744 L) Mid Engine, RWD Longitudinal
- Transmission: 5-speed + 1 reverse Manual
- Power: 301 kW (409 PS; 404 bhp) at 8,000 rpm 388 N⋅m (286 lb⋅ft)
- Weight: 820 kilograms (1,810 lb)

Competition history
- Notable drivers: John Surtees; Ludovico Scarfiotti; Mike Parkes; Lorenzo Bandini; Nino Vaccarella; Jean Guichet; Pedro Rodriguez
Entries	Races	Wins	Podiums	Poles
7	5	2	2	2

In many publications, the 330 P2 is equated with the Ferrari 275 P2, which is probably wrong. Because in all result lists of international sports car races, the types are separated because they differ significantly in terms of engine power and displacement of the 12-cylinder engines.

The 330 P2 no longer had a classic space frame. As practiced from 1963 with the Ferrari Formula 1 monoposto racing car, a self-supporting body made of riveted aluminium sheets was developed. It was made by Carrozzeria Fantuzzi. The rear suspension was carried over from the Ferrari 158 Formula One car. Unlike the previous 330 models, the 330 P2 had wider rims and tubeless Dunlop racing tires. The power was transmitted via a newly developed 5-speed gearbox.

The 330 P2 received a new V12 engine (bank angle 60°) with four overhead camshafts. The engine had six twin Weber carburetors and two spark plugs per cylinder. While the displacement of the 275 P2 was 3.3 liters, this type had the 4-liter variant or 3969 cm^{3} (bore 77 mm, stroke 71 mm). The engine output was 410 hp at 8200 rpm (according to other sources 420 hp at 8000 rpm). According to Ferrari, the car weighed around 820 kg dry and had a wheelbase of 2400 mm.

The 330 P2 made its racing debut in the 1965 World Sportscar Championship. At the first race of the year, the Daytona 2000 km race, chassis 0838 was entered for John Surtees and Pedro Rodríguez. Surtees set the best lap time in practice with a time of 2:00.600 minutes. The time corresponds to an average speed of 183.032 km/h. In the race, the car retired after 116 laps due to damage to the rear axle. The vehicle had been in the lead almost all the time until it retired. A 330 P2, this time chassis 0828, was also the fastest vehicle on the test day for the 24-hour race in Le Mans.

In the second race, the 1000 km race in Monza (25 April), Surtees and Ludovico Scarfiotti only had to admit defeat to teammates Mike Parkes and Jean Guichet in the 275 P2 sister model. At the race on the Nürburgring, Surtees and Scarfiotti took revenge and celebrated the first and only race victory with the 330P2. They drove the 1003.640 km in 6:53:05.4 hours or at an average speed of 145.775 km/h. Parkes/Guichet in the 275P2 finished second, 44.8 seconds back.

However, its use in the Le Mans 24-hour race turned out to be a fiasco. Both vehicles failed. The Surtees/Scarfiotti car suffered clutch failure after 225 laps and the second 330 P2 with Jean Guichet at the wheel rolled to a stop on Sunday morning with gearbox failure. The last racing action for a 330 P2 was in September 1965 at a Can-Am race, the Players Mont-Tremblant, in which David Piper finished second to John Surtees, who had entered a Lola T70 privately.

=== 365 P2 ===
Ferrari 365P2
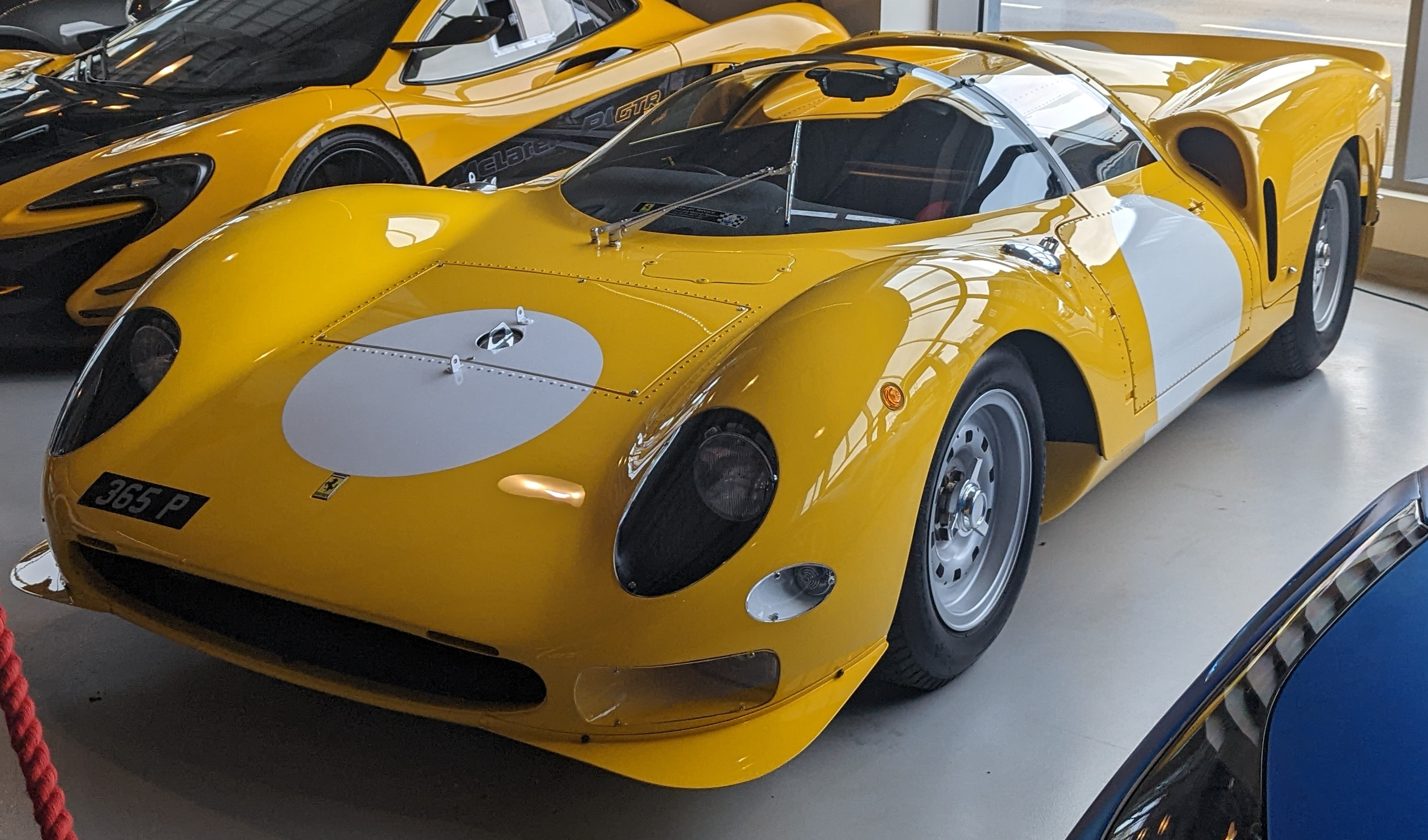
- Homologation: Ferrari 365 P Berlinetta Speciale
- Production: 2

Technical specifications
- Chassis: Tubular chassis
- Suspension: Double wishbone suspension
- Length: 4,191 millimetres (165.0 in)
- Width: 1,753 millimetres (69.0 in)
- Height: 1,092 millimetres (43.0 in)
- Axle track: 1,400 millimetres (55 in) (Front); 1,370 millimetres (54 in) (Rear)
- Wheelbase: 2,400 millimetres (94 in)
- Engine: Colombo V12 4,390.35 cubic centimetres (267.916 cu in; 4.39035 L) Mid Engine, RWD Longitudinal
- Transmission: 5-speed + 1 reverse Manual
- Power: 279 kW (374 bhp; 379 PS) at 7,200 rpm 363 N⋅m (268 lb⋅ft) at 5,000 rpm
- Weight: 850 kilograms (1,870 lb)

Competition history
- Notable drivers: David Piper; Jean Blaton; Richard Attwood; Pedro Rodriguez; Lucien Bianchi; Mike Parkes; Herbert Müller; Masten Gregory; Mario Andretti; Leon Dernier; Willy Mairesse; Tommy Spychiger; Nino Vaccarella
Entries	Races	Wins	Podiums	Poles
46	35	9	14	3

For 1965 Ferrari also built a customer version of P2 cars; they were equipped with a SOHC 4.4 L engine and thus were named 365 P2. In 1966 Ferrari upgraded their 365 P2 cars with new bodywork by Piero Drogo.

=== Racing Results ===
Chassis	(United States) SEB	(Italy) MON	(Italy) TGA	(Germany) NÜR	(France) LMS	(United States) BRI
0828		2	1	1	Ret	
0832		Ret	Ret	2	Ret	
0836		1	Ret		Ret	

== 330 P3 ==
Ferrari 330P3
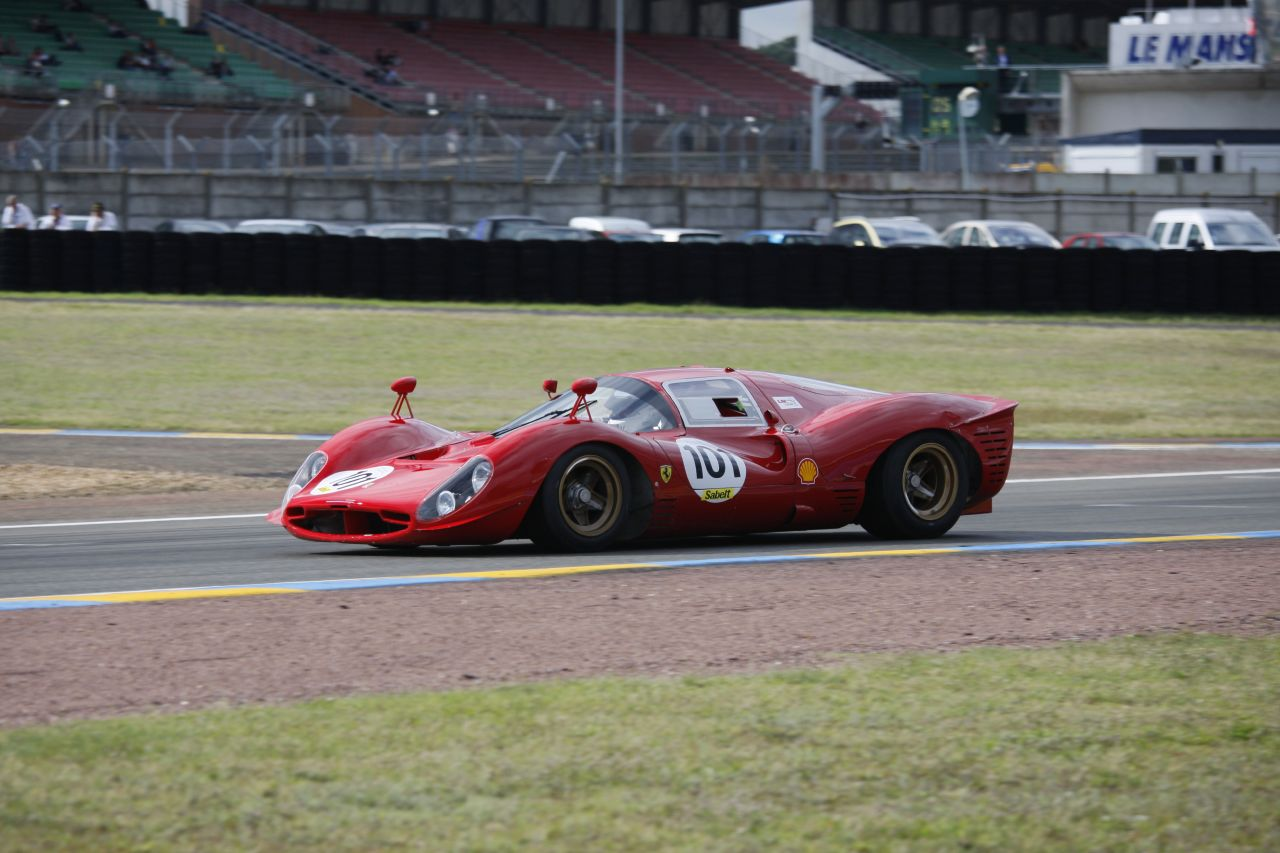
- Production: 3

Technical specifications
- Chassis: Tubular chassis
- Suspension: Double wishbone suspension
- Length: 4,185 millimetres (164.8 in)
- Width: 1,780 millimetres (70 in)
- Height: 1,000 millimetres (39 in)
- Axle track: 1,488 millimetres (58.6 in) (Front); 1,450 millimetres (57 in) (Rear)
- Wheelbase: 2,412 millimetres (95.0 in)
- Engine: Colombo V12 3,967.44 cubic centimetres (242.108 cu in; 3.96744 L) Mid Engine, RWD Longitudinal
- Transmission: ZF 5-speed + 1 reverse Manual
- Power: 309 kW (414 bhp; 420 PS) at 8,000 rpm 450 N⋅m (332 lb⋅ft)
- Weight: 851 kilograms (1,876 lb)

Competition history
- Notable drivers: Mike Parkes; Lorenzo Bandini; John Surtees; Nino Vaccarella; Chris Amon; Ludovico Scarfiotti; Richie Ginther; Bob Bondurant; Jean Guichet; Pedro Rodriguez
Entries	Races	Wins	Podiums	Poles
13	10	4	3	3

The 1966 330 P3 introduced fuel injection to the Ferrari stable. It used a P3 (Type 593) transmission whose gears were prone to failure.

There are no longer any Ferrari 330 P3s extant as the original 330 P3 0846 was converted to a P3/P4 and definitively written off and scrapped by Ferrari due to previous accident damage and fire damage it sustained at Le Mans 1967, and P3s 0844 and 0848 were converted to P3/412 Ps by Ferrari. At a later point P3/412 P 0844 was converted by Ferrari to a 330 Can-Am and in the 1990s returned to P3/412 P configuration in private ownership.

In order to be able to accept the challenge posed by the competition from the Ford GT40, the P2 was consistently further developed. Before 1969, when Fiat injected capital into History of Ferrari after acquiring it, Ferrari was facing a cash crunch, so Ferrari could only continue to exploit the potential of the Colombo engine rather than developing a new engine at the time. So better performance could only be achieved through reduced weight and improved aerodynamics. Three new bodies were therefore created in the workshop of Piero Drogo, who also gave the customer 365P2 a new shape.

In 1966, Ferrari used Lucas injection for the first time in the 330 P3. Like the P2, the 330 P3 had dual ignition and four overhead camshafts. Ferrari specified 420 hp at 8000 rpm as performance. The vehicle had a ZF gearbox and a Borg&Beck clutch.

The 330 P3 made its racing debut at the 1966 Sebring 12 Hour, with Mike Parkes and Bob Bondurant behind the wheel. After finishing second in qualifying, the duo retired after 178 laps in second place with a gearbox failure. But the second mission brought the Scuderia a historic success. Mike Parkes, this time with partner John Surtees, won the Monza 1000 km race ahead of the two Ford GT40s driven by Masten Gregory / John Whitmore and Herbert Müller/Willy Mairesse. This achievement is significant in that Monza was driven for the last time on the original 10 km track including the banked corners.

At the 1966 Targa Florio, Nino Vaccarella and Lorenzo Bandini failed because of Bandini's impetuous driving style, much to the chagrin of the Sicilian Vaccarella. In a superior position in the lead, Bandini lost control of the P3 in a narrow passage and damaged the front of the car so badly in the accident that it was unthinkable to continue. Victory at the 1000 km race at Spa-Francorchamps followed, driven out again by Mike Parkes and John Surtees.

In the 1966 1000 km race on the Nürburgring, the two Brits retired prematurely after taking pole position due to clutch damage. The Ferrari didn't stand a chance against the superiority of Ford in the Le Mans 24-hour race. Enzo Ferrari also made an exception to the usual vehicle policy at the Sarthe and ceded a P3 to Luigi Chinetti's North American Racing Team. There, chassis 0846 was converted into the only P3 Spyder, driven by Pedro Rodríguez and Richie Ginther. However, the car failed after just 151 laps with gearbox damage. The two factory cars didn't fare much better. Mike Parkes was involved in an accident in the number 20 car he shared with Ludovico Scarfiotti. The second works car, starting number 21 and driven by Jean Guichet and Lorenzo Bandini, had an engine failure.

In 1967 the 330 P3s were replaced by the 330 P4s and two copies were given to the Scuderia Filipinetti.

== 330 P4 ==
Ferrari 330P4
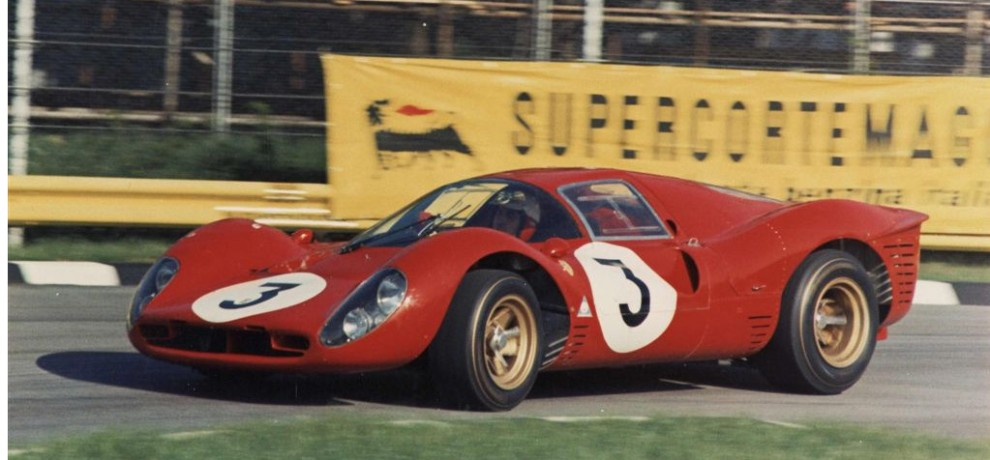
- Chassis 0856 at the 1967 1000km Monza
- Designer: Piero Drogo
- Production: 4
- Successor: Ferrari 312P

Technical specifications
- Chassis: Tubular chassis
- Suspension: Double wishbone suspension
- Length: 4,185 millimetres (164.8 in)
- Width: 1,810 millimetres (71 in)
- Height: 1,000 millimetres (39 in)
- Axle track: 1,488 millimetres (58.6 in) (Front); 1,450 millimetres (57 in) (Rear)
- Wheelbase: 2,400 millimetres (94 in)
- Engine: Colombo V12 3,967.44 cubic centimetres (242.108 cu in; 3.96744 L) Mid Engine, RWD Longitudinal
- Transmission: ZF 5-speed + 1 reverse Manual
- Power: 331 kW (450 PS; 444 bhp) at 8,000 rpm 523 N⋅m (386 lb⋅ft) at 6,000 rpm
- Weight: 792 kg (1,746 lb)

Competition history
- Notable drivers: Ludovico Scarfiotti; Chris Amon; Mike Parkes; Pedro Rodriguez; Jackie Stewart; Peter Sutcliffe; Gordon Tatum; Willy Mairesse; Günther Klass; Paul Hawkins; Jonathan Williams; Hans Herrmann; Lorenzo Bandini; Jean Blaton
Entries	Races	Wins	Podiums	Poles
20	14	1	4	0

1967 was a banner year for the Enzo Ferrari motor company, as it saw the production of the mid-engined 330 P4, a V12-engined endurance car intended to replace the previous year's 330 P3. Only four Ferrari P4-engined cars were ever made: three new 330 P4s and one upgraded P3 chassis (0846). Their three-valve cylinder head was modeled after those of Italian Grand Prix-winning Formula One cars. To this was added the same fuel injection system from the P3 for an output of up to 450 hp (331 kW).

The P3 had won the 1000 km Monza in 1966, and the P4 won the same race in 1967. Two P4s, and one 412 P crossed the finish line together (in first 0846, second 0856, and third place 0844) in the 1967 24 Hours of Daytona, for a photo finish to counter Ford's photo of the Ford GT40 Mk.II crossing the finish line together in first, second, and third at the 1966 24 Hours of Le Mans.

Since then, the fate of these four cars has been the subject of much attention.

- 0846. Built in 1966 as the first of 3 works 330 P3s and the only P3 Spyder. Retained by the works at the end of 1966 and used as the basis for the new P4 and partially converted to P4 specification for 1967. Ferrari states 0846 no longer exists. It was decided by the factory to scrap the chassis due to its previous accident history and fire damage sustained at Le Mans, 1967. The original chassis number has been written off Ferrari's books as an existing chassis, but the number is still in their ownership.
- 0856 was originally built as a Berlinetta but converted by the factory into a Spyder for Brands Hatch, 1967 as it remains today. 0856 was sold to a new owner in 2020.
- 0858 was originally a Berlinetta but converted by Ferrari into a Spyder for Brands Hatch, 1967 and later in the year converted into a 350 Can-Am by them. Now fitted with a P4 Berlinetta body and is in German ownership.
- 0860 was also originally a Berlinetta and converted to a Spyder for Brands Hatch, 1967 and like 0858 converted by Ferrari to a 350 Can-Am but was fitted with a P4 Spyder body in the early 1970s by its then French owner in whose family it remains today.
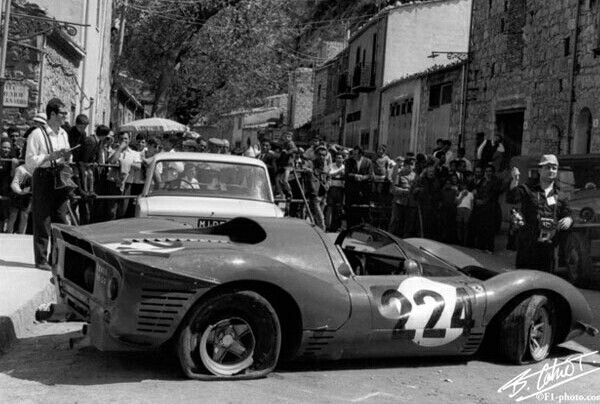
s/n 0846 at Targa Florio, 1967

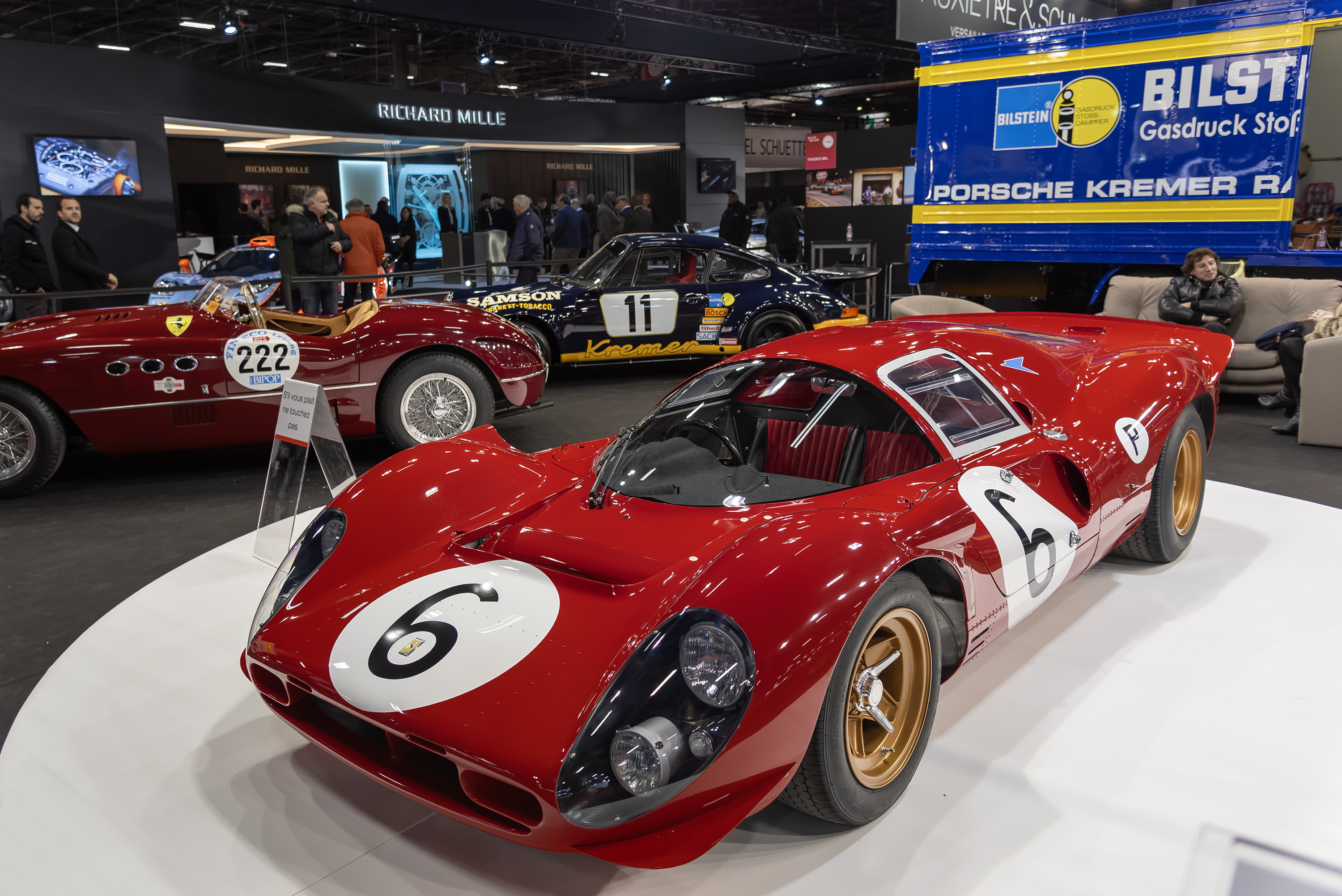
s/n 0858 at Retromobile, 2020

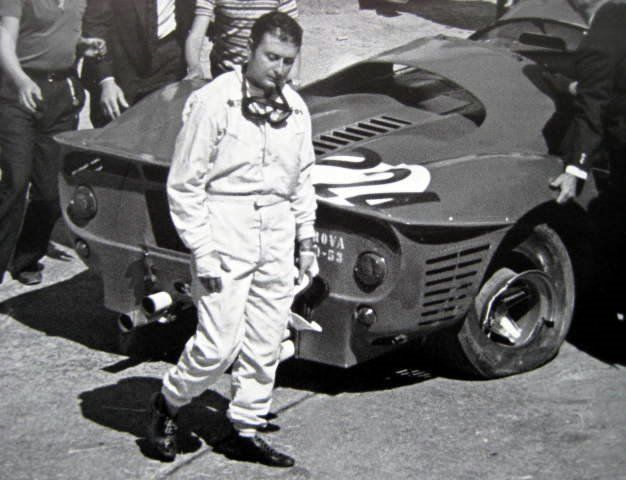
Nino Vaccarella walks away from his damaged Ferrari 330 P4 at Collesano during the Targa Florio on 14 May 1967.

== 412 P ==
Ferrari 412 P
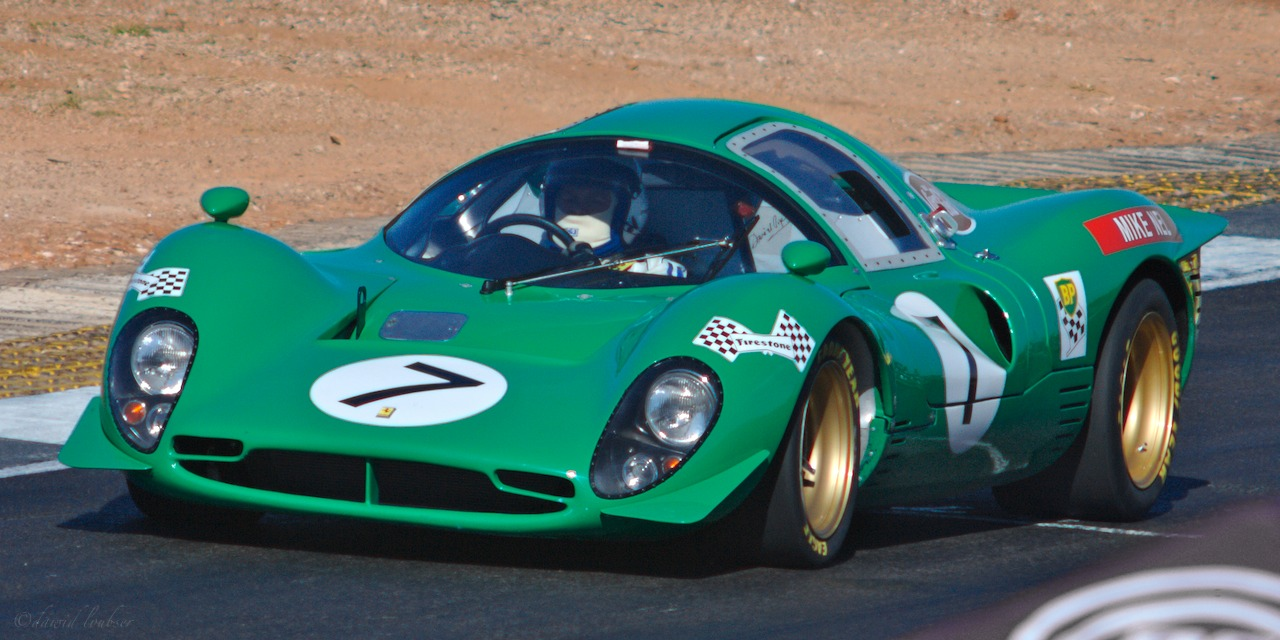
- Production: 2
- Successor: Ferrari 612P (Can Am Only)

Technical specifications
- Chassis: Tubular chassis
- Suspension: Double wishbone suspension
- Length: 4,180 millimetres (165 in)
- Width: 1,780 millimetres (70 in)
- Height: 1,000 millimetres (39 in)
- Axle track: 1,488 millimetres (58.6 in) (Front); 1,450 millimetres (57 in) (Rear)
- Wheelbase: 2,412 millimetres (95.0 in)
- Engine: Colombo V12 3,967.44 cubic centimetres (242.108 cu in; 3.96744 L) Mid Engine, RWD Longitudinal
- Transmission: ZF 5-speed + 1 reverse Manual
- Power: 309 kW (414 bhp; 420 PS) at 8,000 rpm 442 N⋅m (326 lb⋅ft)
- Weight: 835 kilograms (1,841 lb)

Competition history
- Notable drivers: David Piper; Richard Attwood; Herbert Müller; Jean Guichet; Pedro Rodriguez; Jean Blaton; Lucien Bianchi; Willy Mairesse; Ludovico Scarfiotti; Giancarlo Baghetti; Piers Courage; Jo Siffert; Mike Parkes; Nino Vaccarella; Mario Casoni
Entries	Races	Wins	Podiums	Poles
34	28	6	12	4

The Ferrari 412 P was a "customer version" of the famous 330 P3 race car, built for independent teams like NART (0844), Scuderia Filipinetti (0848), Francorchamps (0850), and Maranello Concessionaires (0854). These cars had carburetor engines instead of the factory Lucas fuel injection. Surviving 412 P cars are worth approximately $35–45 million USD according to Cavallino Magazines' current Buyers Guide.

There are only two cars that were originally built as 412 Ps: 0850 and 0854. P3 chassis. P3 Typo Motors except for carburetors in place of FI. P4 suspension 0844 and 0848 were originally P3 Factory Racecars but when Ferrari sold them to customers they removed the Lucas Mechanical Fuel Injection and replaced it with Weber carburetors which reduced their output, something Ferrari wanted to do so that they would win points but not beat the factory cars which were then P4 0846 (See Above), P4 0856, P4 0858, and P4 0860. The P3s and 412 P had the same 4-liter block which is different from the P4-4 liter block and all had P3 not P4 chassis. All of the P3 chassis were made in 1966 at the same time but because of labor strikes only three of the five P3 chassis were built up into cars in 1966. The unbuilt-up P3 chassis were eventually built up into 412P 0850 and 0854 in 1967. P4 0846 was unique having, after modification by Ferrari for the 1967 race season, a P3 chassis with a P4 engine.

The 412 P and P4 models weren't eligible for the International Championship of Makes in 1968 as their engines were too large for the new 3 litre Group 6 Prototype category and too few examples had been built to allow homologation for the 5 litre Group 4 Sports Car category which required production of at least 50 units. Ferrari did not contest the championship for a year in protest.

Two 412 P Berlinettas were originally built. Two P3s were converted to 412Ps by Ferrari:

- 0844 Originally a works Berlinetta was converted by Ferrari from a P3 to into a customer concessionaires P3/412 P, then by Ferrari and NART to an open Barchetta 330 Can-Am, and is currently in Germany fitted with a Berlinetta 412 P body.
- 0848 Originally a works Berlinetta was converted by Ferrari from a P3 to a customer concessionaires P3/412 P and is currently in Switzerland.
- 0850 Originally a customer concessionaire Berlinetta, was at one time, in private ownership, converted for road use as a spyder but was later refitted with a Berlinetta body and is currently owned by an American. Ferrari Classiche restoration was completed in 2017.
- 0854 Originally a customer concessionaire Berlinetta, in private ownership was heavily burned out and "virtually destroyed" at a race in East London, S.A. 1969 when it had an open/Barchetta GRP body fitted to it by modifying and cutting the rear of chassis. The remains were rebuilt, again as an open Barchetta and then further rebuilt into a 412P Esque Spyder and used on the road. It has now been returned to Berlinetta configuration using the original front and rear clips and doors but the main center part of the body, roof, and sills have been remade in the US. It is currently owned by collector, businessman, and racing driver, François Perrodo.

== 312 P ==
Ferrari 312 P
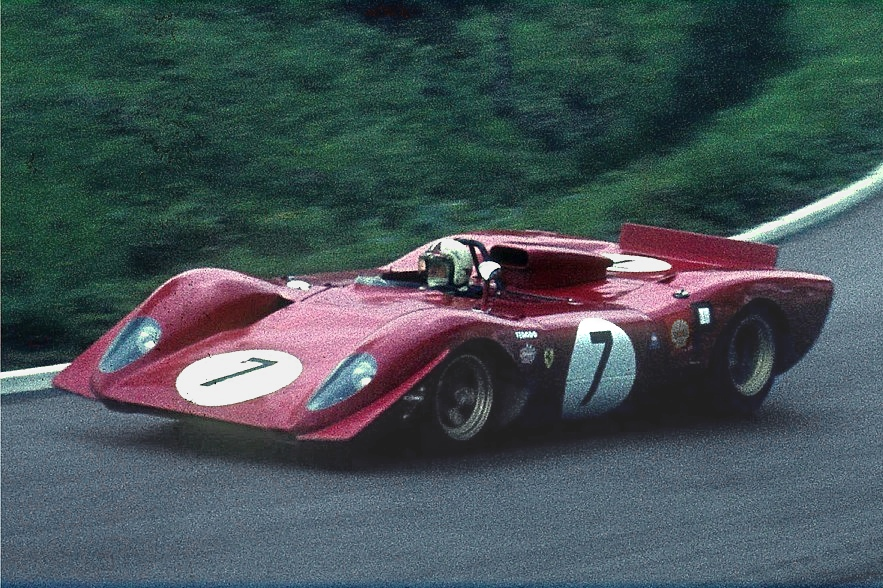
- A Ferrari 312 P driven by Chris Amon at the 1969 1000 km Nürburgring
- Category: Group 6
- Production: 3
- Successor: Ferrari 312 PB

Technical specifications
- Chassis: Semi-Monocoque
- Suspension: Double wishbone suspension
- Length: 3,500 millimetres (140 in)
- Width: 1,880 millimetres (74 in)
- Height: 956 millimetres (37.6 in)
- Axle track: 1,425 millimetres (56.1 in) (Front); 1,400 millimetres (55 in) (Rear)
- Wheelbase: 2,220 millimetres (87 in)
- Engine: Colombo V12 2,991.01 cubic centimetres (182.523 cu in; 2.99101 L) Mid Engine, RWD Longitudinal
- Transmission: 5-speed + 1 reverse Manual
- Power: 450 bhp (336 kW; 456 PS) at 10,800 rpm 465 N⋅m (343 lb⋅ft)
- Weight: 585 kilograms (1,290 lb)

Competition history
- Notable drivers: Pedro Rodriguez; Chris Amon; Luigi Chinetti; Tony Adamowicz; David Piper; Mario Andretti; Mike Parkes; Sam Posey; Chuck Parsons; Peter Schetty; George Eaton; Jean-Francois Jaunet
Entries	Races	Wins	Podiums	Poles
20	15	3	2	2

After boycotting sports car racing in 1968 to protest the rule change, Ferrari built another 3000cc prototype in 1968, named the 312 P.

The 3.0 Ferrari 312 P Barchetta and 3.0 Ferrari 312 P Berlinetta were hardly more than 3-litre F1 Ferrari 312s with prototype bodies. At the 12 Hours of Sebring the spyder finished second to a JWA Gulf Ford GT40. At the BOAC 500 at Brands Hatch the same spyder was fourth behind three Porsche 908-01s. At 1000km Monza, Chris Amon took the pole with the 312 P spyder, ahead of Jo Siffert's 908–01, but had to retire. At the 1000km Spa, a 312 P was second, behind the Siffert-Redman 908-01LH. At Le Mans two 312 P Berlinettas were entered. They were five and six on the grid, but did not finish. At the end of the season the 312 Ps were sold to NART, the American Ferrari importer belonging to Luigi Chinetti.

Three 312 Ps were built:

- 0868 Spyder configuration, dismantled after Monza accident
- 0870 Berlinetta configuration in Bardinon Collection
- 0872 Berlinetta configuration (and Spyder body available) in Switzerland

== 612P ==
Ferrari 612P
- Category: Can-Am
- Production: 1968-69
- Successor: Ferrari 712P

Technical specifications
- Length: 4,200 millimetres (170 in)
- Width: 2,240 millimetres (88 in)
- Height: 890 millimetres (35 in)
- Axle track: 1,603 millimetres (63.1 in); 1,591 millimetres (62.6 in)
- Wheelbase: 2,450 millimetres (96 in)
- Engine: Ferrari 512 Derived V12 6,222 cubic centimetres (379.7 cu in; 6.222 L) (92 by 78 millimetres (3.6 in × 3.1 in)) RMR
- Transmission: 4-speed manual, 1 reverse gear
- Power: 455 kW (610 bhp; 619 PS) at 7,000 rpm 588 N⋅m (434 lb⋅ft) at 5,600 rpm
- Weight: 680–700 kilograms (1,500–1,540 lb)

Competition history
- Notable entrants: Scuderia Ferrari
- Notable drivers: Jim Adams; Chris Amon
Entries	Races	Wins	Podiums	Poles
20	16	0	4	1

The Ferrari 612P (the "P" stands for prototype, the "6" refers to the engine displacement, and the "12" denotes the number of cylinders), is a purpose-built Group 7 prototype, designed, developed and built by Scuderia Ferrari, specifically intended to be used in the North American Can-Am sports car racing series in 1968-1971.

== 712P ==
Ferrari 712P
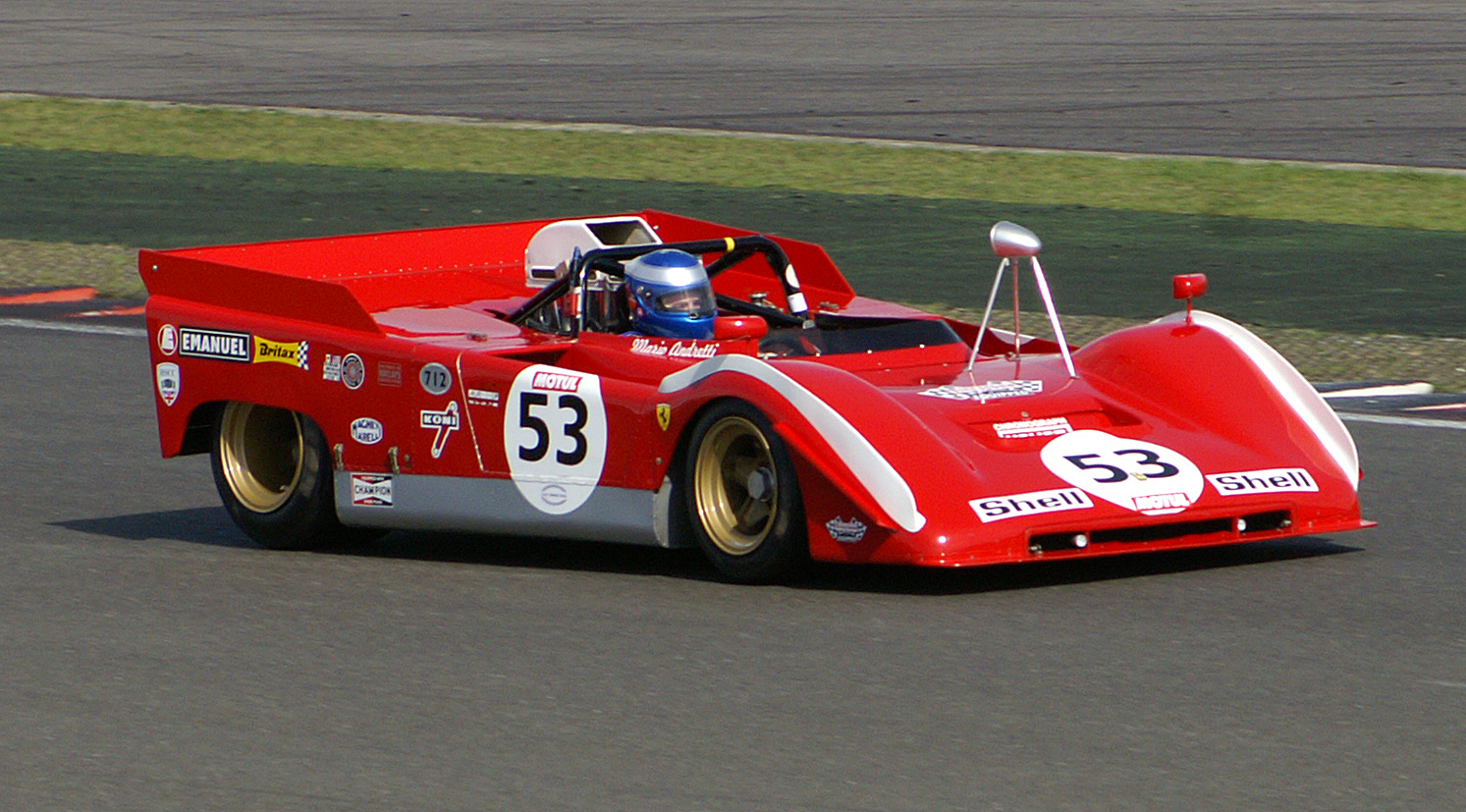
- Category: Can-Am
- Production: 2
- Predecessor: Ferrari 612P

Technical specifications
- Axle track: 1,603 millimetres (63.1 in); 1,590 millimetres (63 in)
- Wheelbase: 2,450 millimetres (96 in)
- Engine: Ferrari 512 Derived V12 6,860 cubic centimetres (419 cu in; 6.86 L) (92.0 by 86.0 millimetres (3.62 in × 3.39 in) RMR
- Transmission: 4-speed manual, 1 reverse gear
- Power: 750 bhp (760 PS; 559 kW) at 8,000 rpm 1,000 N⋅m (738 lb⋅ft)
- Weight: 680–650 kilograms (1,500–1,430 lb)

Competition history
- Notable entrants: Scuderia Ferrari
- Notable drivers: Sam Posey; Jean-Pierre Jarier; Mario Andretti; Brian Redman
Entries	Races	Wins	Podiums	Poles
4	3	0	0	1

The Ferrari 712P is a purpose-built Group 7 prototype, designed, developed and built by Scuderia Ferrari specifically designed to compete in Can-Am sports car races from 1970 to 1974. The 7 refers to the displacement of the engine in liters, the 12 refers to the number of cylinders, and the P stands for Prototype.

== 312 PB ==
Ferrari 312 P
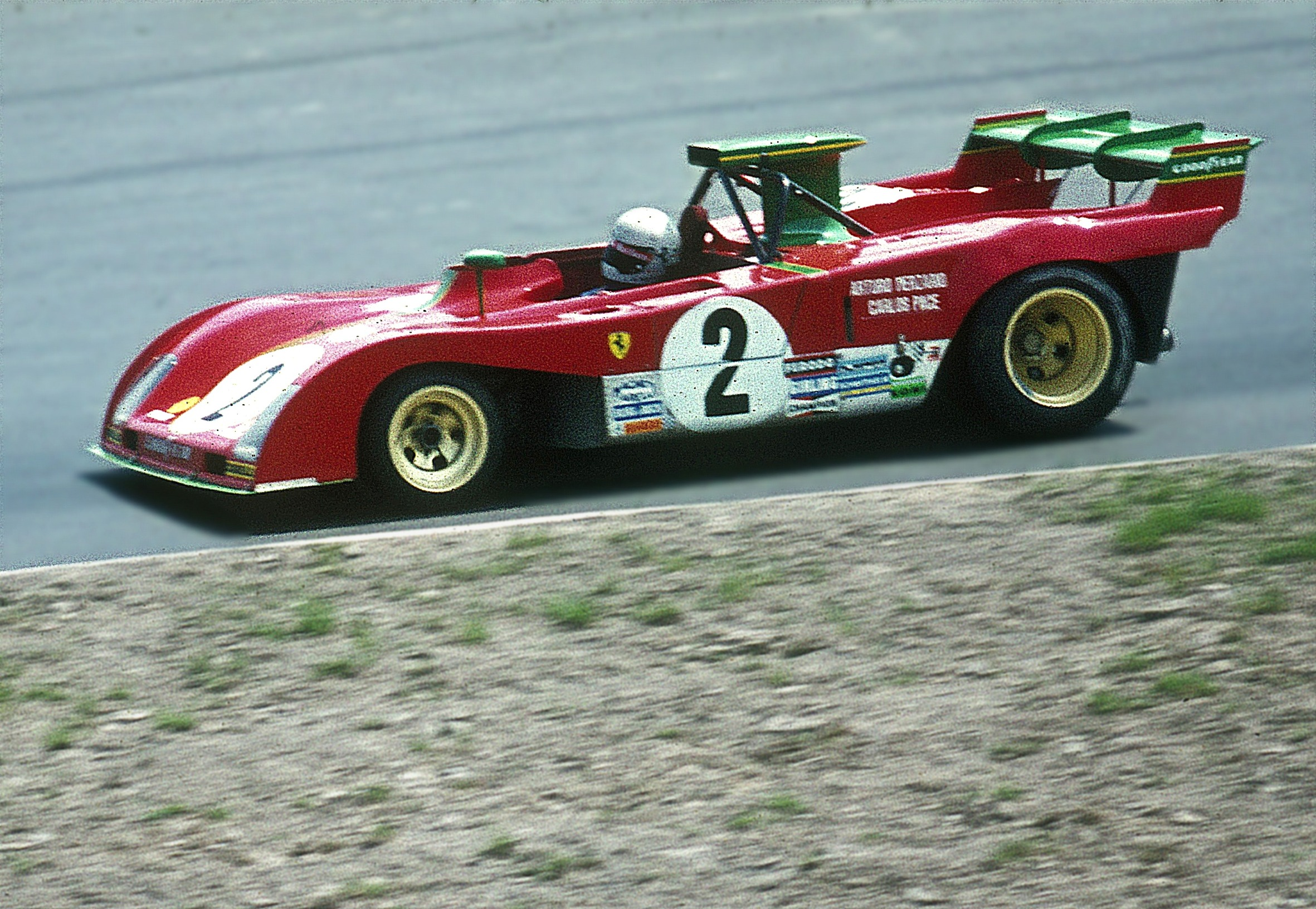
- Category: 1971:Group 6 Prototype-Sports Car; 1972-73:Group 5 Sports Car
- Constructor: Scuderia Ferrari
- Designer: Mauro Forghieri
- Predecessor: Ferrari 312 P
- Successor: Ferrari 333SP

Technical specifications
- Chassis: Aluminium central monocoque with steel spaceframe front and rear
- Suspension (front): Double wishbone, outboard coil spring/damper
- Suspension (rear): Single top-link, reversed lower wishbone, twin radius arms, outboard spring/damper
- Engine: Ferrari Tipo 001 2,991 cubic centimetres (182.5 cu in; 2.991 L) DOHC flat-12, naturally aspirated, mid-mounted
- Transmission: Ferrari 5-speed manual
- Power: 460 bhp (466 PS; 343 kW) at 10,800 rpm 399 lb⋅ft (541 N⋅m)
- Weight: 665 kilograms (1,466 lb)
- Fuel: Shell
- Tyres: Firestone/Goodyear

Competition history
- Notable entrants: Scuderia Ferrari
- Notable drivers: (Sweden) Ronnie Peterson; (Belgium) Jacky Ickx; (Switzerland) Clay Regazzoni; (United Kingdom) Brian Redman; (United States) Mario Andretti; (Italy) Arturo Merzario; (Italy) Sandro Munari; (Australia) Tim Schenken; (Argentina) Carlos Reutemann; (Brazil) Carlos Pace
- Debut: 1971 1000 km Buenos Aires
Entries	Races	Wins	Podiums	Poles
72	33	15	21	17
- Constructors' Championships: 1 (1972 WSC)

In 1971, another rule change was announced for 1972, and Ferrari abandoned further development of the 512M in order to focus on a new 3 Litre prototype based on the 312B F1 car. The 312P would prove fast but fragile in its debut at the 1971 Sebring 12 hours. Further development over the 1971 season brought increased reliability. The press added a "B" to the 312P's name, but in Ferrari's official records it is called the "Ferrari 312 P".

The 312Ps with the flat-12 boxer engine were very successful, winning ten out of eleven races in the 1972 World Championship for Makes and delivering the title to Ferrari. Scuderia Ferrari didn't enter the 1972 24 Hours of Le Mans, as Enzo Ferrari thought that the F1-based engine could not last the full 24 hours. He would be proven wrong.

The team competed in the 1973 24 Hours of Le Mans and finished second behind Matra, which would also be the teams' final standing in the 1973 championship. At the end of the 1973 season, Ferrari was forced by chief investor FIAT to abandon sports car racing, instead focusing on F1.

== P4/5 ==
Ferrari P4/5 by Pininfarina
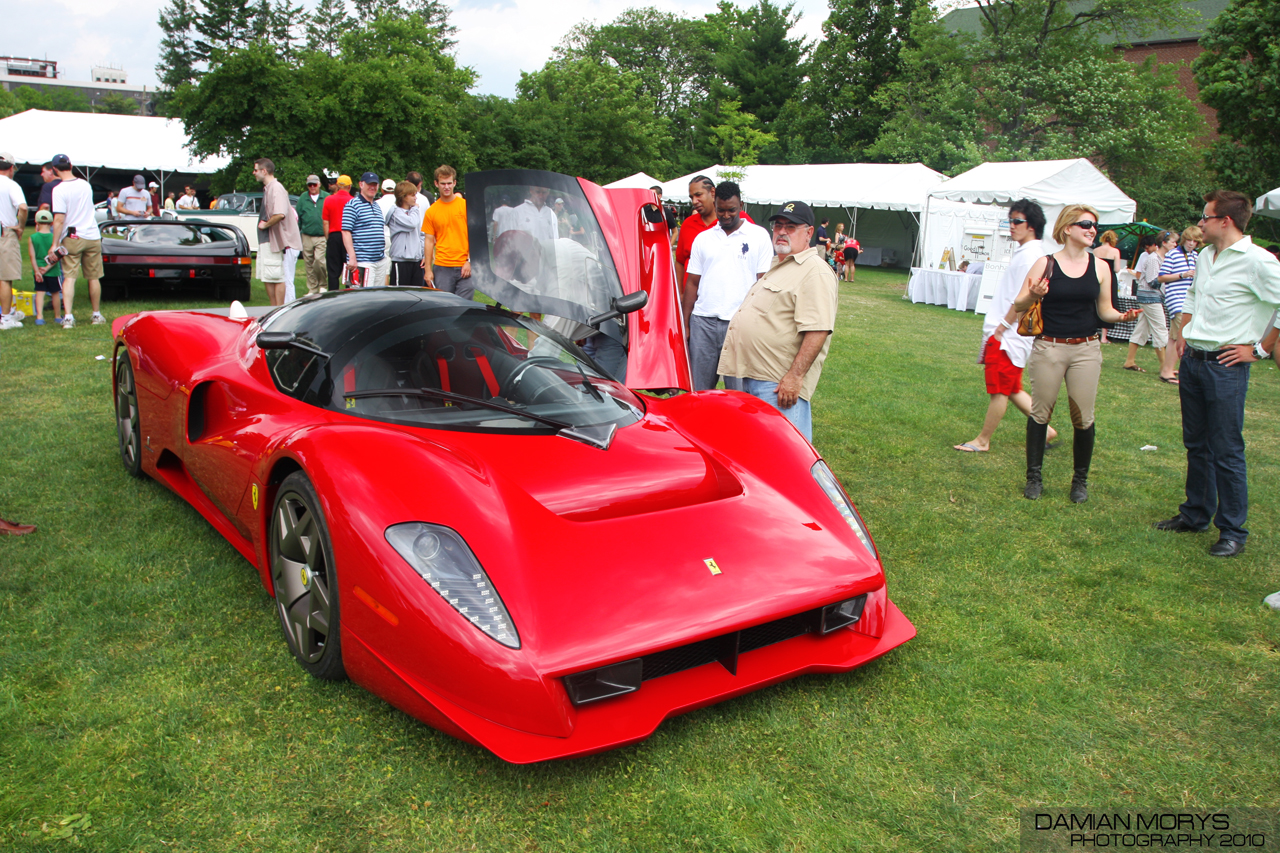

Overview
- Manufacturer: Ferrari / Pininfarina
- Also called: Scuderia Cameron Glickenhaus P4/5 Competizione
- Production: 2006 and 2011 (2 produced, 1 road car, 1 race car)
- Assembly: Turin, Italy
- Designer: Jason Castriota at Pininfarina

Body and chassis
- Body style: Coupe
- Layout: Mid engine, RWD
- Related: Ferrari Enzo; Ferrari F430 GT3

Powertrain
- Engine: Road Car: 5,999 cubic centimetres (366.1 cu in; 5.999 L) Tipo F140 B V12; Competizione: 3,996 cubic centimetres (243.9 cu in; 3.996 L) Ferrari F131 GT V8 engine
- Power output: Road Car: 652 bhp (661 PS; 486 kW) at 7,800 rpm 657 N⋅m (485 lb⋅ft) at 5,500 rpm Competizione: 440 bhp (446 PS; 328 kW) at 7,000 rpm 460 N⋅m (339 lb⋅ft) at 5,200 rpm
- Transmission: 6-speed AMT (Both)

Dimensions
- Curb weight: Road Car: 1,200 kilograms (2,600 lb); Competizione: 1,230 kilograms (2,710 lb)

Chronology
- Successor: Scuderia Cameron Glickenhaus SCG 003C

The Ferrari P4/5 (officially known as the Ferrari P4/5 by Pininfarina) is a one-off sports car made by Italian sports car manufacturer Ferrari but redesigned by Pininfarina for film director James Glickenhaus, son of stock exchange magnate Seth Glickenhaus. The car was initially a 2003 Enzo Ferrari but the owner James Glickenhaus preferred the styling of Ferrari's 1960s race cars, the P Series. The project cost Glickenhaus US$4 million and was officially presented to the public in August 2006 at the Pebble Beach Concours d'Elégance.

== 499P ==
Ferrari 499P
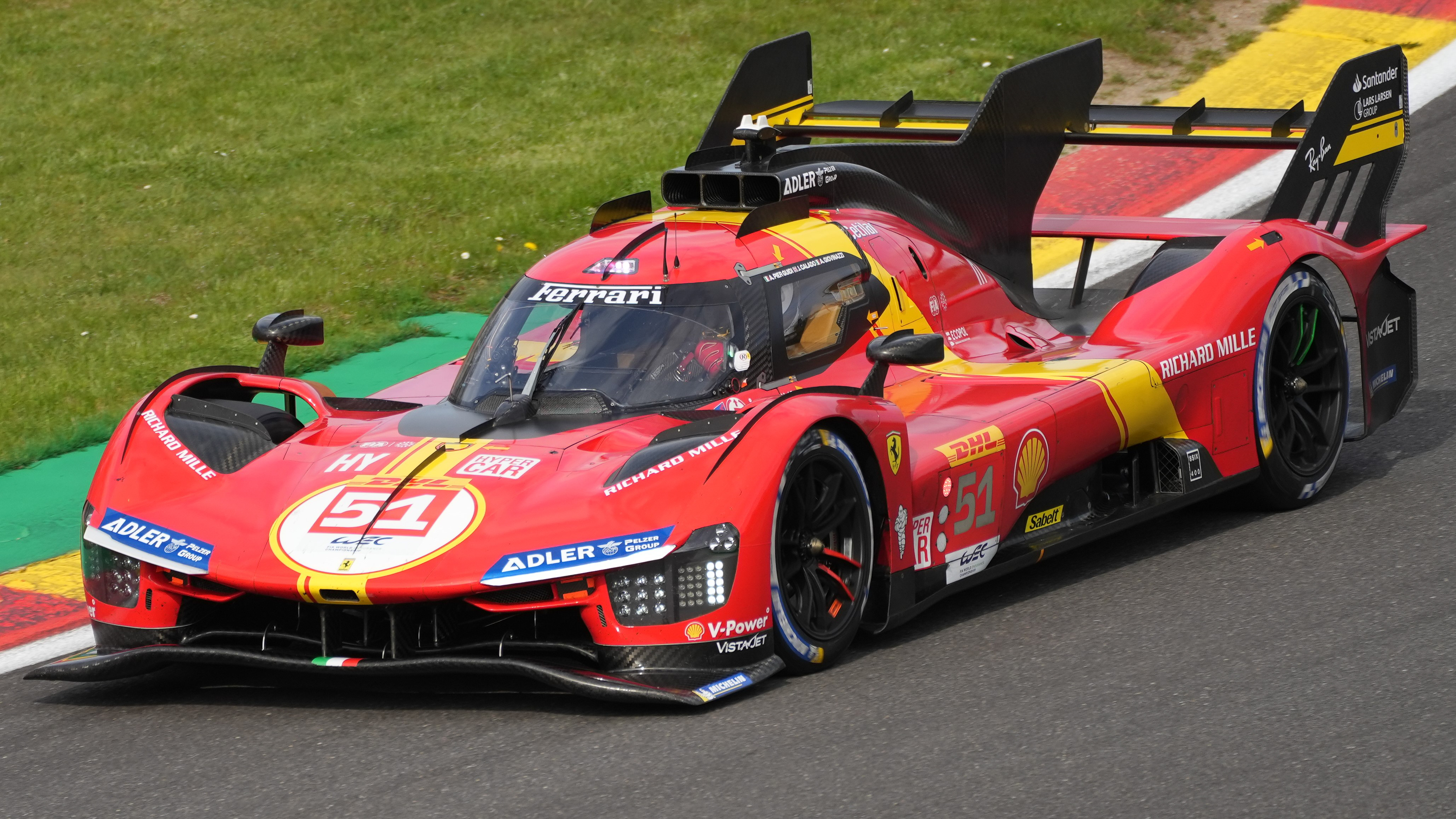
- Category: Le Mans Hypercar
- Designers: Flavio Manzoni (Design Director, Centro Stile Ferrari); Ferdinando Cannizzo (Technical Director); Stefano Carmassi (Technical Manager); Carlo Palazzani (Exterior Designer); Francesco Russo (Advanced Lead Designer); Silvia Cavallaro (Head of Color and Trim)
- Predecessor: Ferrari 333 SP

Technical specifications
- Chassis: Carbon fibre monocoque
- Suspension: Double wishbones with pushrods
- Engine: Ferrari F163 2,992 cc (182.6 cu in) 120° V6 twin-turbo, longitudinally-mounted
- Electric motor: 200 kW (272 PS; 268 hp); 275 pound-feet (373 N⋅m) mounted on the front axle
- Transmission: Xtrac 7-speed sequential manual
- Battery: Ferrari 900 V
- Power: 671 bhp (680 PS; 500 kW); 580 lb⋅ft (786 N⋅m) (Petrol); 268 bhp (272 PS; 200 kW); 275 lb⋅ft (373 N⋅m) (Electric)
- Weight: 1,030 kg (2,270.8 lb)
- Fuel: TotalEnergies
- Lubricants: Shell Helix Ultra
- Brakes: Brembo carbon 380/355mm with Brembo Monobloc 6-piston calipers
- Tyres: Michelin slicks with OZ one-piece forged alloys, 29/71-18 front and 34/71-18 rear

Competition history
- Notable entrants: (Italy) Ferrari – AF Corse; (Italy) AF Corse
- Notable drivers: (Italy) Antonio Giovinazzi; (Italy) Alessandro Pier Guidi; (Italy) Antonio Fuoco; (Spain) Miguel Molina; (Denmark) Nicklas Nielsen; (United Kingdom) James Calado; (Poland) Robert Kubica; (Israel) Robert Shwartzman; (China) Yifei Ye
- Debut: 2023 1000 Miles of Sebring
- First win: 2023 24 Hours of Le Mans
- Last win: 2025 24 Hours of Le Mans
- Last event: 2025 24 Hours of Le Mans
Races	Wins	Podiums	Poles	F/Laps
24	7	24	9	6
- Constructors' Championships: 1 (2025)

After 50 years, Ferrari returned to produce a prototype for 24 Hours of Le Mans racing. The Ferrari 499P belonging to the Le Mans Hypercar class, was unveiled to the public on the evening of 29 October 2022 at Finali Mondiali in Imola. On its first outing at the 2023 24 Hours of Le Mans, the 499P driven by Antonio Giovinazzi, Alessandro Pier Guidi and James Calado won the race. It was Ferrari's first overall victory at Le Mans since the 1965 24 Hours of Le Mans, ending the streak of five victories by Toyota Gazoo Racing. At the 2024 24 Hours of Le Mans, Ferrari achieved its eleventh victory, second consecutive at Le Mans since 1965 with the No. 50 499P driven by Antonio Fuoco, Miguel Molina and Nicklas Nielsen. While the Ferrari No. 51 499P driven by Alessandro Pier Guidi, James Calado, and Antonio Giovinazzi, winner of the last edition, came in third place. In 2025, Ferrari managed to win Le Mans for the third time consecutive, for the first time ever without wearing their typical red livery, when a yellow AF Corse #83 driven by Robert Kubica, Phil Hanson and Yifei Ye crossed finish line in 1st overall place after 387 completed laps.
