= Ferrari 612P =

- Category: Can-Am
- Designer(s): Giacomo Caliri
- Production: 1968-69
- Predecessor: Ferrari 412P
- Successor: Ferrari 712P

Technical specifications
- Length: 4,200 millimetres (170 in)
- Width: 2,240 millimetres (88 in)
- Height: 890 millimetres (35 in)
- Axle track: 1,603 millimetres (63.1 in); 1,591 millimetres (62.6 in)
- Wheelbase: 2,450 millimetres (96 in)
- Engine: Ferrari 512 Derived V12 6,222 cubic centimetres (379.7 cu in; 6.222 L) (92 by 78 millimetres (3.6 in × 3.1 in)) RMR
- Transmission: 4-speed manual, 1 reverse gear
- Power: 455 kilowatts (610 bhp; 619 PS) @ 7,000 rpm 588 newton-metres (434 lbf⋅ft) @ 5,600 rpm
- Weight: 680–700 kilograms (1,500–1,540 lb)

Competition history
- Notable entrants: Scuderia Ferrari
- Notable drivers: Jim Adams; Chris Amon
Entries	Races	Wins	Podiums	Poles
20	16	0	4	1

The Ferrari 612P (the "P" stands for prototype, the "6" refers to the engine displacement, and the "12" denotes the number of cylinders), is a purpose-built Group 7 prototype, designed, developed and built by Scuderia Ferrari, specifically intended to be used in the North American Can-Am sports car racing series in 1968-1971.

== Development history ==
In 1968, the management of Scuderia decided to build its own sports car for the CanAm racing series, popular in Canada and the United States, and to use it themselves. In 1967 a converted Ferrari 412P was used as a 412 Can-Am. The North American Racing Team from Luigi Chinetti organized the racing commitments.

The Ferrari 612 Can-Am had the 12-cylinder mid-engine initially used in the Ferrari 512S. The engine developed 620 hp with a displacement of almost 6.2 liters. In order to achieve sufficient traction for the rear wheels despite this performance, a powerful rear wing was mounted just behind the driver above the engine.

== Racing history ==
The car made its debut in the fall of 1968. New Zealander Chris Amon, Scuderia works driver in Formula One and the sports car world championship, crashed out of the race in Las Vegas after just one lap. The entire 1969 season was only partially successful, as the Scuderia operated the missions only with limited commitment. Chris Amon's second place in Edmonton remained the best place for the car for the entire season. With third places in Watkins Glen and Mid-Ohio, Amon made two more podium finishes. It was succeeded by the Ferrari 712P Can-Am in 1970, however, the 612P was raced through 1971

== Technical specifications (612P Can-Am) ==
- Year of construction 1968; used in 1968 and 1969
- Motor: 12-cylinder V mid-engine
- Bore × stroke: 92 mm (3.6 in) x 78 mm (3.1 in)
- Displacement : 6,222 cc (379.7 cu in)
- Compression: 10.5:1
- Power: 455 kW (620 HP) @ 7000 rpm
- Max. Torque: 588 N⋅m (434 lb⋅ft) @ 5600 rpm
- Mixture preparation: Lucas fuel injection
- Cooling: water
- Transmission: 4 aisles, 1 return aisle, installed longitudinally
- Chassis: Aluminum riveted panels over steel tube frame.
- Front suspension: Independent suspension on double wishbones, coil springs
- Rear suspension: Independent suspension on double wishbones, coil springs
- Shock absorber: Hydraulic telescopic shock absorbers front and rear
- Brakes: Internally ventilated disc brakes all around, on the outside of the wheel carriers
- Wheelbase: 2,450 mm (96 in)
- Track (Front/Rear): 1,603 mm (63.1 in)/1,591 mm (62.6 in)
- External dimensions (L/W/H): 4,200 mm (170 in)/2,240 mm (88 in)/890 mm (35 in)
- Dry weight : 700 kg (1,500 lb) (680 kg (1,500 lb) in 1969)
- Top speed: 300 km/h (190 mph)
