= Ferrari 712P =

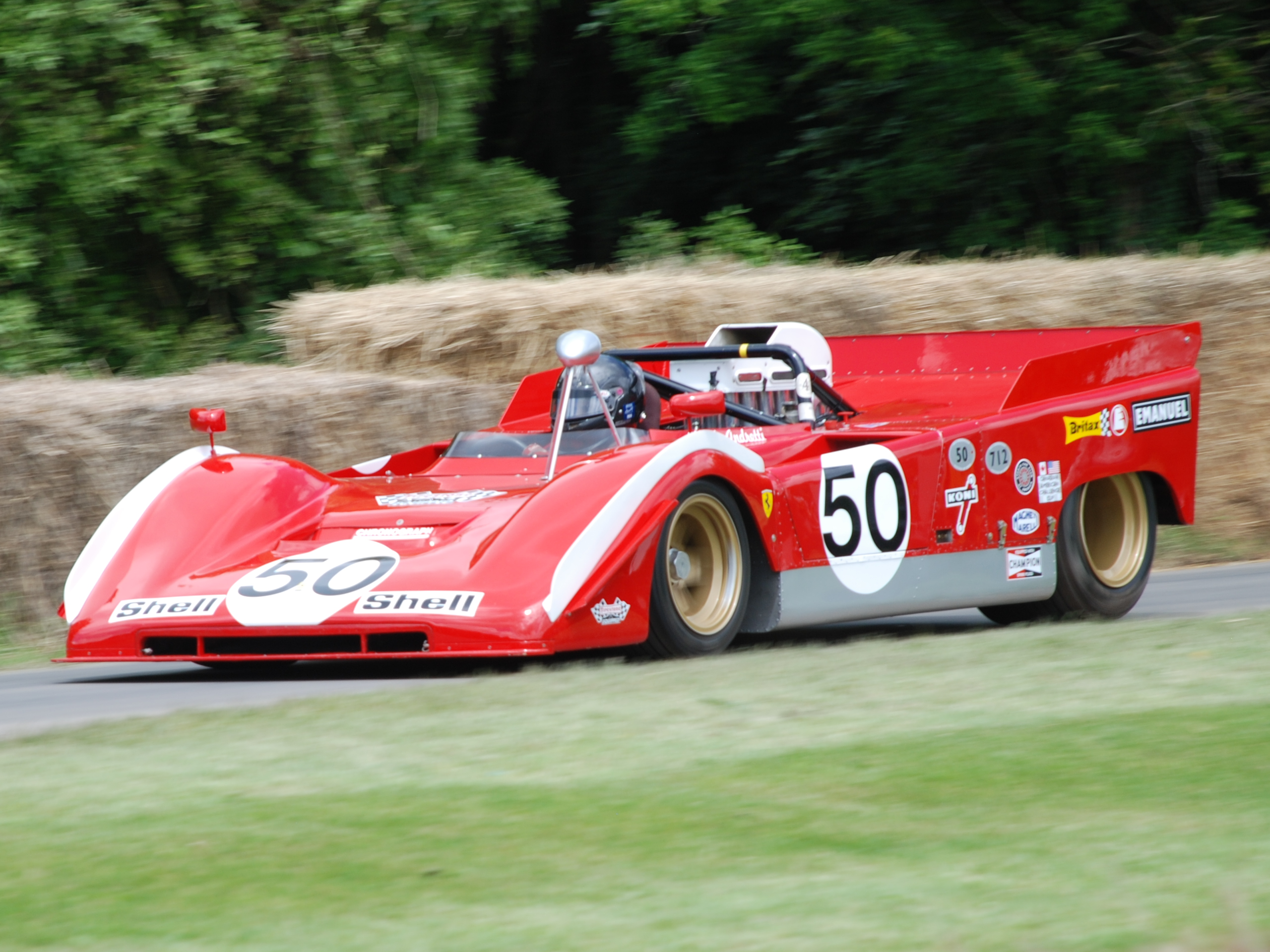
- Category: Can-Am
- Designer: Giacomo Caliri
- Production: 2 (1970-1971)
- Predecessor: Ferrari 612P

Technical specifications
- Axle track: 1,603 millimetres (63.1 in); 1,590 millimetres (63 in)
- Wheelbase: 2,450 millimetres (96 in)
- Engine: Ferrari 512 Derived V12 6,860 cubic centimetres (419 cu in; 6.86 L) (92.0 by 86.0 millimetres (3.62 in × 3.39 in)) RMR
- Transmission: 4-speed manual, 1 reverse gear
- Power: 750 brake horsepower (760 PS; 560 kW) @ 8,000 rpm 740 newton-metres (550 lbf⋅ft)
- Weight: 650–680 kilograms (1,430–1,500 lb)

Competition history
- Notable entrants: Scuderia Ferrari
- Notable drivers: Sam Posey; Jean-Pierre Jarier; Mario Andretti; Brian Redman
Entries	Races	Wins	Podiums	Poles
4	3	0	0	1

The Ferrari 712P is a purpose-built Group 7 prototype, designed, developed and built by Scuderia Ferrari specifically designed to compete in Can-Am sports car races from 1970 to 1974. The 7 refers to the displacement of the engine in liters, the 12 refers to the number of cylinders, and the P stands for Prototype.

== Development history ==
The Ferrari 712P was the successor model of the Ferrari 612P Can-Am car, and was based on the Ferrari 512S with chassis number 1010. The chassis had already had a checkered history and was given a new, open body. The 7-liter V12 engine was first used in the 612 Can-Am at the end of 1969; it developed 750 hp (560 kW) @ 8000 rpm.

== Racing history ==
The car made its debut at the 1970 Can-Am race at Watkins Glen. It was driven by Mario Andretti, who finished fourth in the race. The Can-Am missions were handled by the North American Racing Team of Luigi Chinetti, who signed the French Jean-Pierre Jarier in 1972. Jarier contested the races at Watkins Glen and Road Atlanta in 1972. Brian Redman drove the car in 1973.

Chinetti used the 712 Can-Am sporadically in races for five years until 1974, when the car was sold. In 2005, the racing car was driven at the AvD-Oldtimer-Grand-Prix at the Nürburgring in historic motorsport.

The 712 was rarely used. The Scuderia itself only used the prototype once, in a sports car race in Imola, which Arturo Merzario won.

== Gallery ==
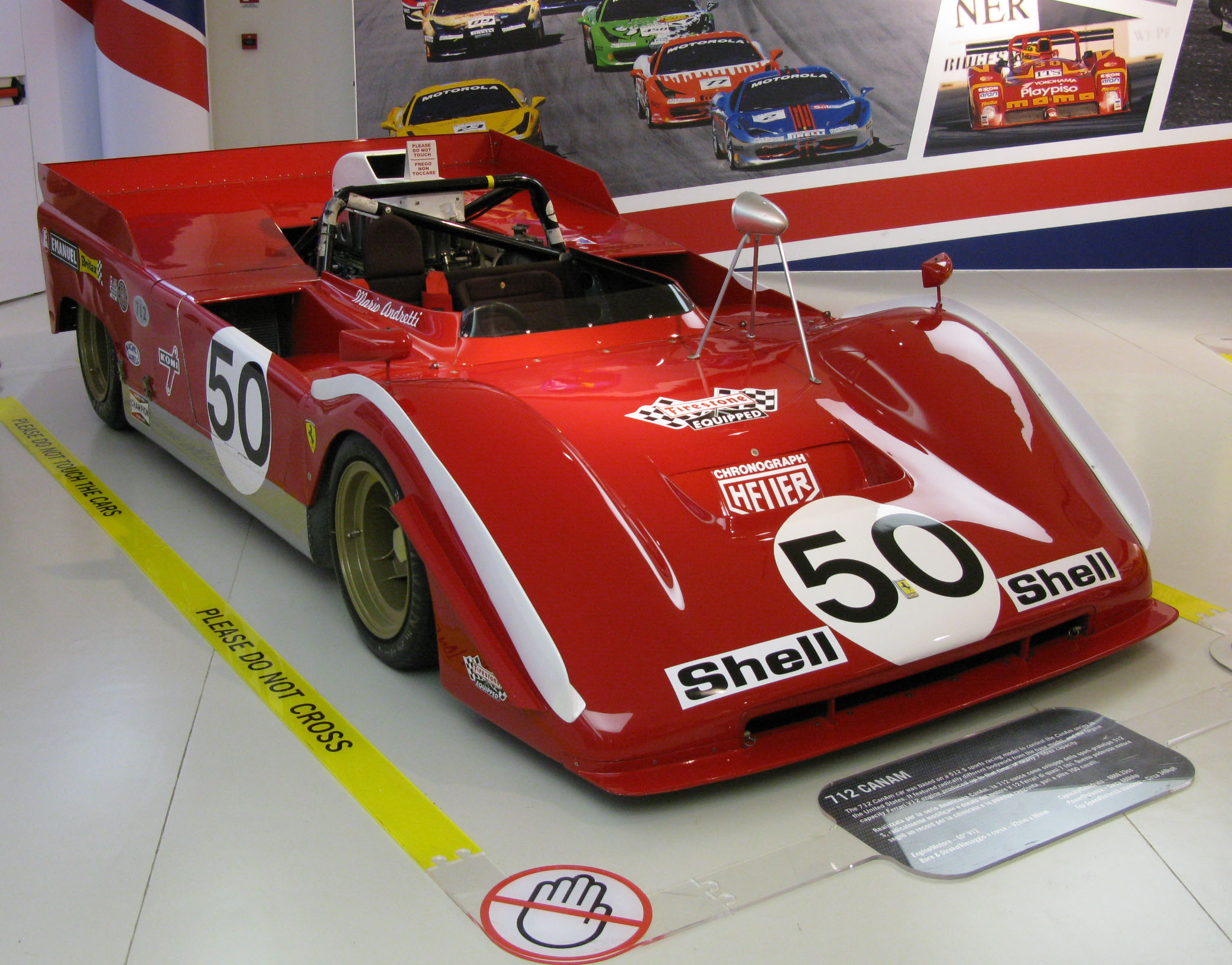
Ferrari 712P front-view

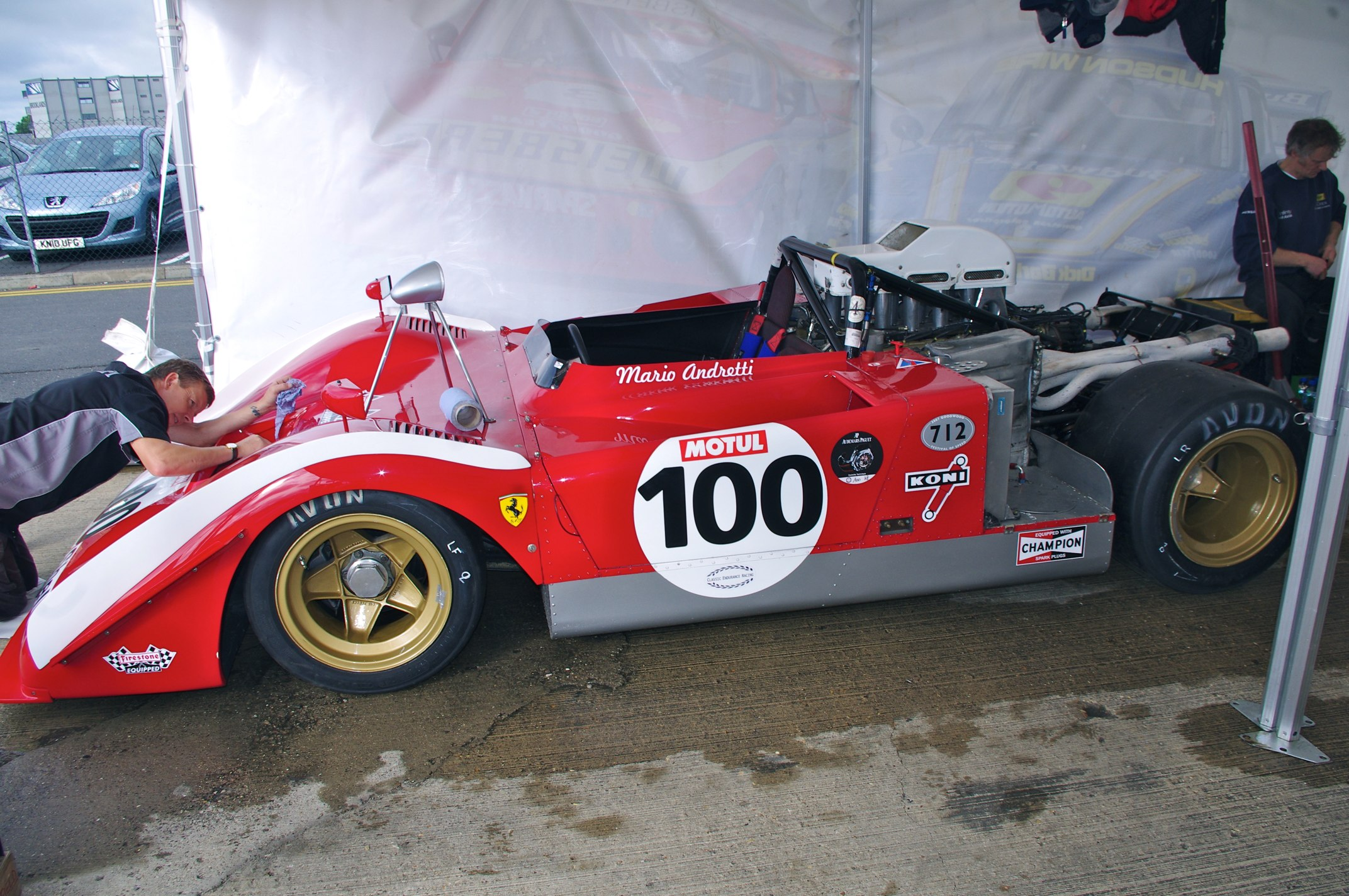
Mario Andretti's 712P on display

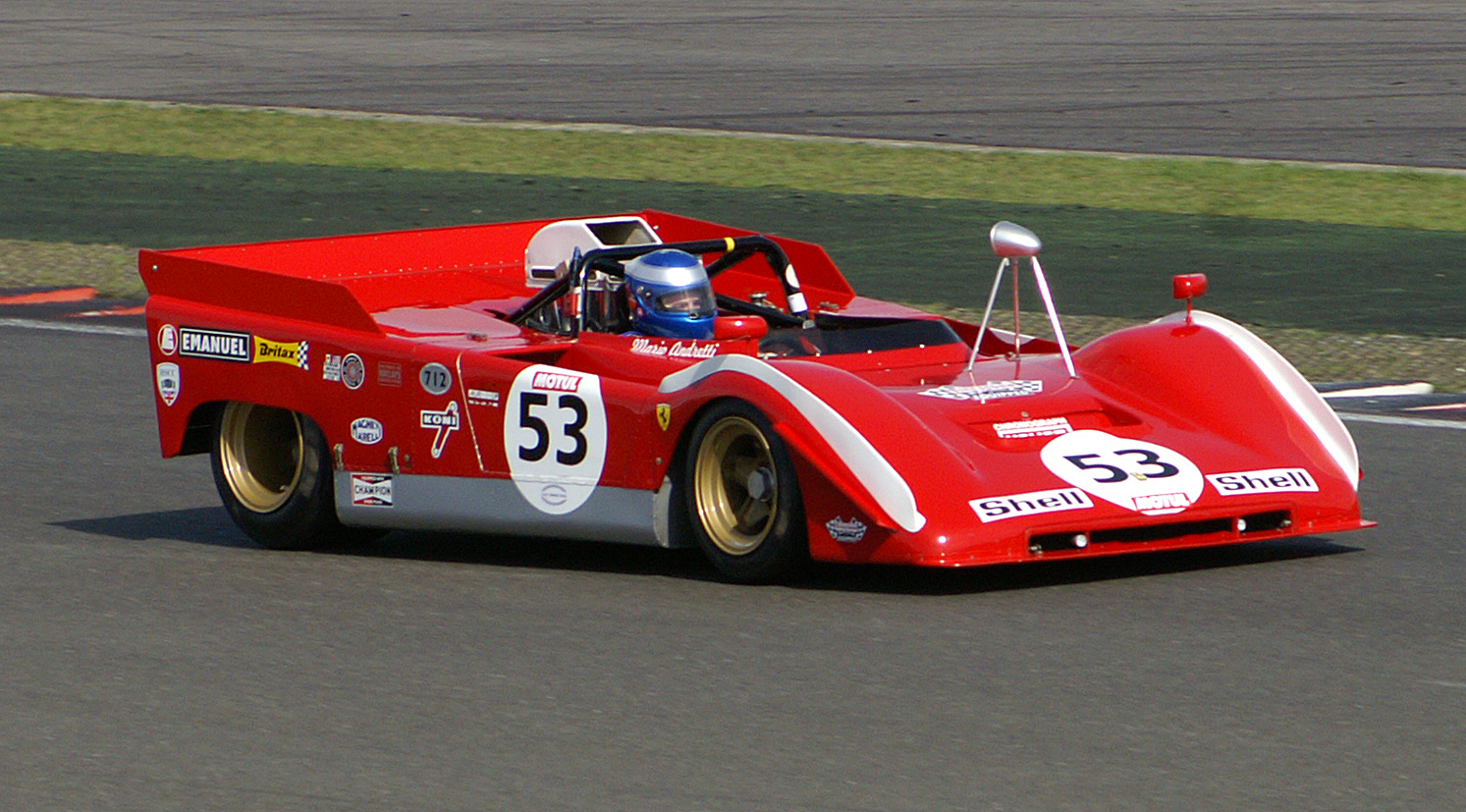
Ferrari 712P at Silverstone Circuit in 2009

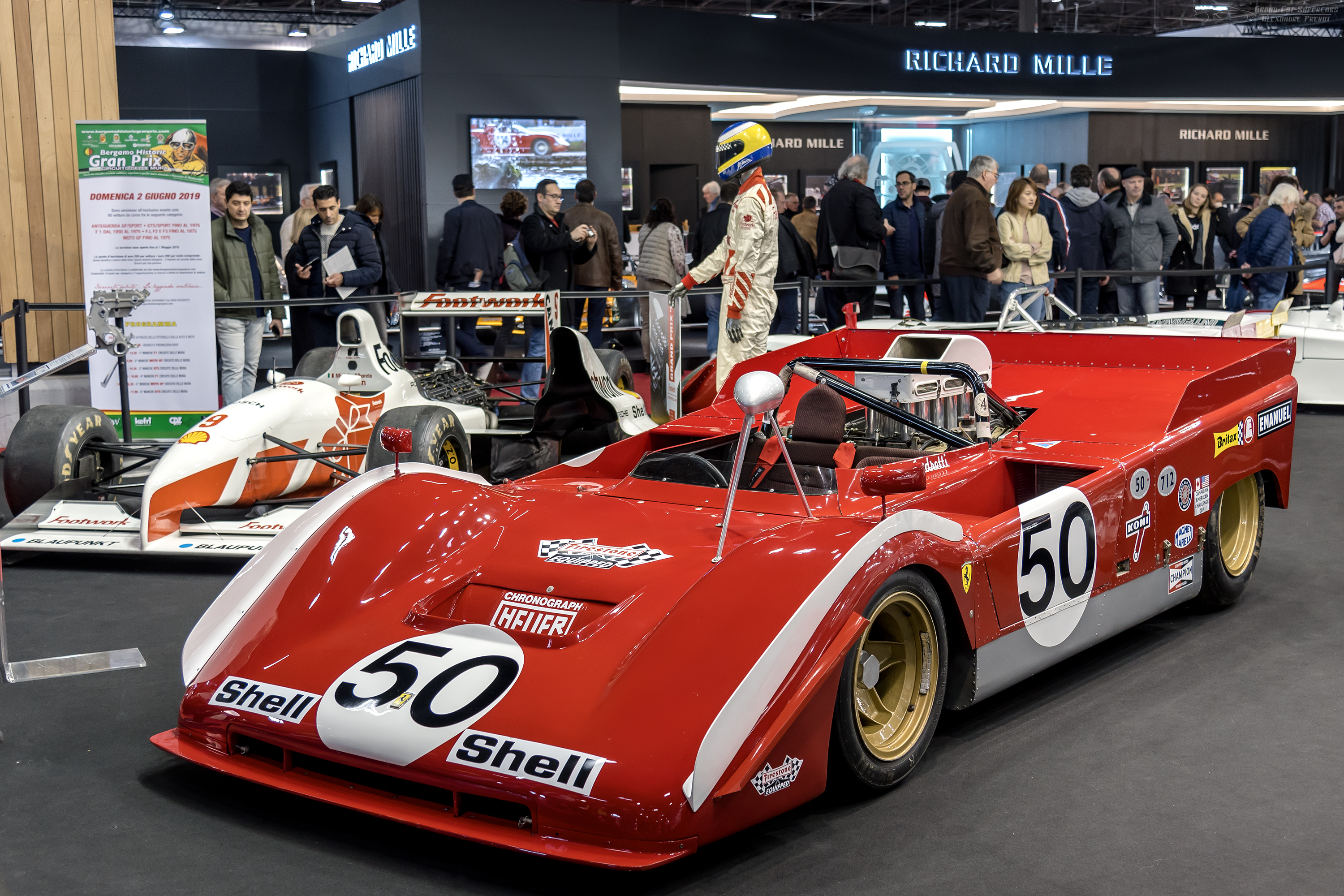
712P on display
