= 1966 24 Hours of Le Mans =

34th 24 Hours of Le Mans endurance race

Previous: 1965	Next: 1967
Index: Races | Winners

The 1966 24 Hours of Le Mans was the 34th Grand Prix of Endurance, and took place on 18 and 19 June 1966. It was also the seventh round of the 1966 World Sportscar Championship season. This was the first overall win at Le Mans for the Ford GT40 as well as the first win for an American constructor in a major European race since Jimmy Murphy's triumph with Duesenberg at the 1921 French Grand Prix. It was also the debut Le Mans start for two significant drivers: Henri Pescarolo, who went on to set the record for the most starts at Le Mans; and Jacky Ickx, whose record of six Le Mans victories stood until beaten by Tom Kristensen in 2005.

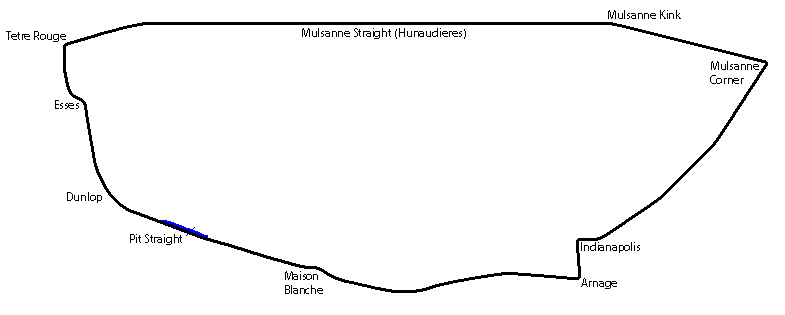
Le Mans in 1967

== Regulations ==
The year 1966 saw the advent of a completely new set of regulations from the CSI (Commission Sportive Internationale – the FIA's regulations body) – the FIA Appendix J, redefining the categories of motorsport in a numerical list. GT cars were now Group 3 and Prototypes were now Group 6, Sports Cars were still Group 4 and Special Touring Cars was a new category defined by Group 5. (Group 1 and 2 covered other Touring Cars, Group 7 led to the Can-Am series, with Group 8 and 9 for single-seaters).

As Group 7 were ineligible for FIA championship events, the Automobile Club de l'Ouest (ACO) opened its entry list to Group 3, 4 and 6. The FIA mandated minimum annual production runs of 500 cars for Group 3 (up from 100 previously) and 50 for Group 4, which also had a maximum engine capacity of 5000cc. There were no engine limits on the GTs or Prototypes. As before, the Groups were split up in classes based on engine size, there was a sliding scale of a minimum weight based on the increasing engine size (from 450 to 1000 kg for 500 to 7000cc) as was fuel-tank capacity (60 to 160 litres).

Along with the new Appendix J, after four years of focus on GT racing the FIA announced the International Manufacturer's Championship, for Group 6 Prototypes (2L / >2L), and the International Sports Car Championship for Group 4 (1.3L / 2L / 5L).

== Entries ==
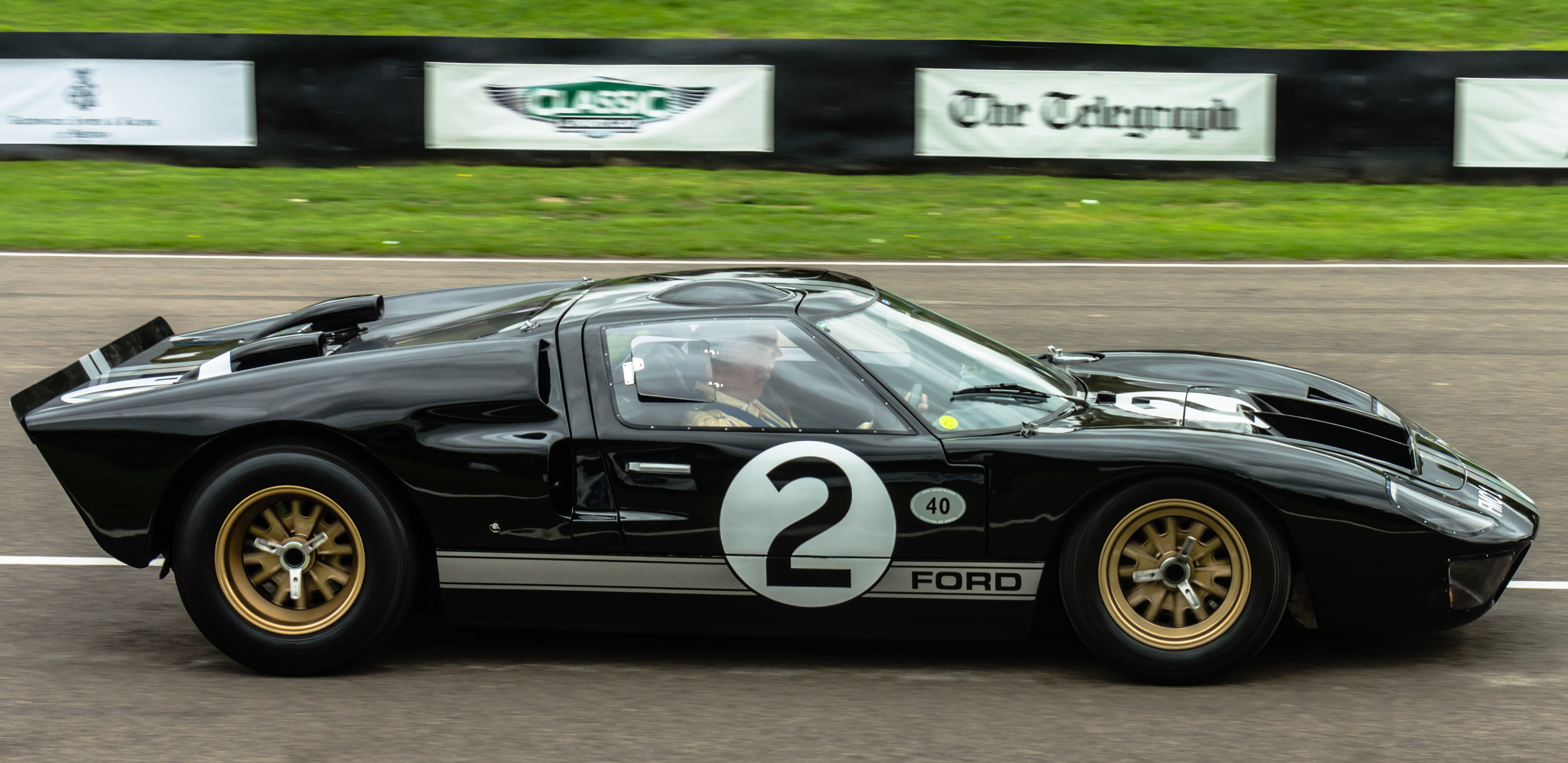
Ford GT40 Mark II

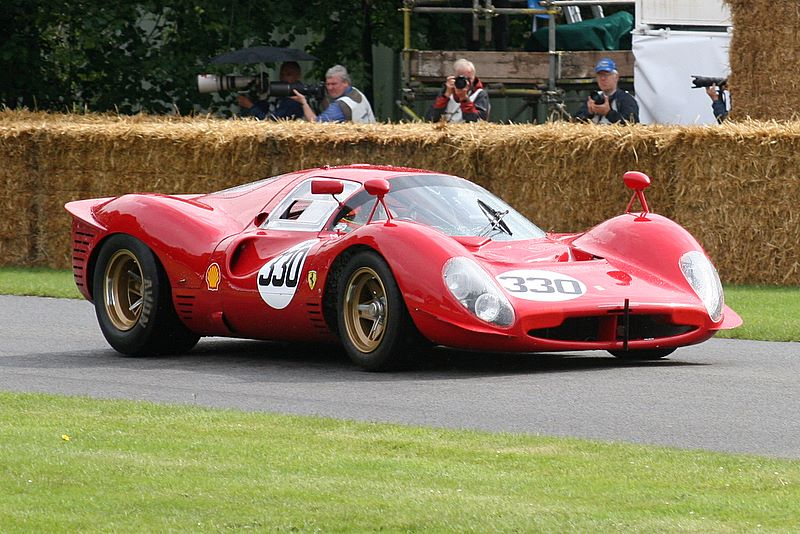
Ferrari 330 P3

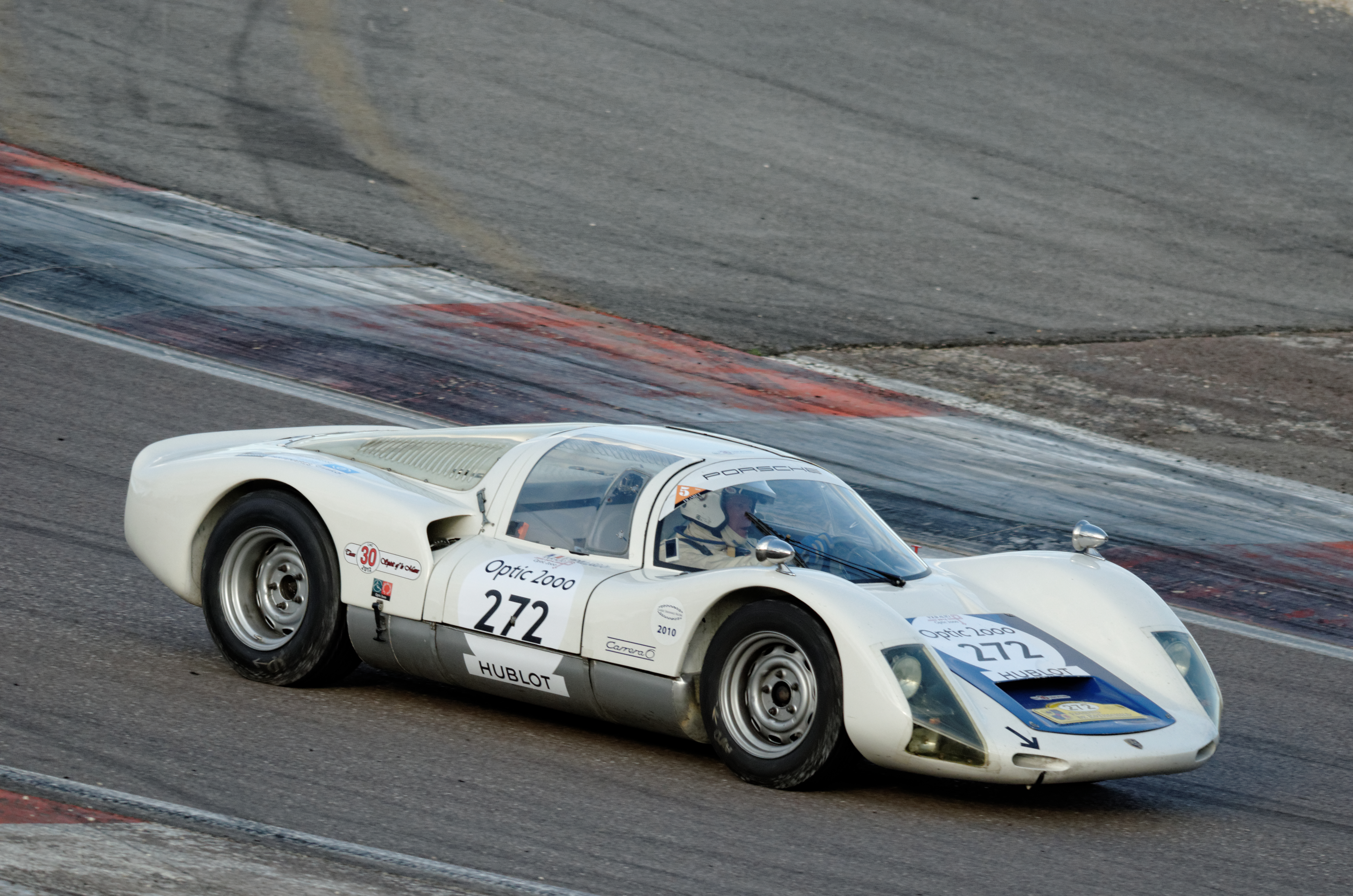
Porsche 906 Carrera

With the new regulations this year the ACO received a huge 103 entry requests. Such was the interest in Group 6 there were 43 prototypes on the starting grid and only 3 GT cars:

Category	Classes	Prototype Group 6	Sportscar Group 4	GT Group 3	Total entries
Large-engines	2.0 - 7.0L	21	5 (+3 reserve)	1 (+1 reserve)	27 (+4 reserves)
Medium-engines	1.6 - 2.0L	12	1 (+1 reserve)	2	15 (+1 reserve)
Small-engines	1.0 - 1.3L	13 (+2 reserves)	0	0	13 (+2 reserves)
Total cars		46 (+2 reserves)	6 (+4 reserves)	3 (+1 reserve)	55 (+7 reserves)

After 2 years of its 3-year program, Ford had very little to show for its immense investment. From the 1966 season onwards, the GT40 could race in two categories. The standard 4.7-litre Mk.I had been homologated in the new Group 4 Sportscars 5.0 class, to let customers teams compete mainly with older 3.3 litre Ferrari 250 LM. For the big prototype class, and overall wins, the factory Mk.II was developed. Extensive work was done in the wind tunnel, and improving the brakes, handling and engine – not least improving the fuel economy. The 7-litre Ford NASCAR race engine now put out ca. 550 bhp but was registered as "485 hp" as a result of Ford's lowered rev-limit setting for the 24h race. The new year started with promise with Ken Miles and Lloyd Ruby winning both the inaugural 24 Hours of Daytona, and then 12 Hours of Sebring. Copying Ferrari's tactic of overwhelming numbers, they put in fifteen Mark II entries; eight were accepted by the ACO, plus five Mk.I in Gr. 4 Sportscars 5.0 class. This time six Mk. II were built and prepared by Holman & Moody. Shelby ran three cars for Americans Dan Gurney and Jerry Grant, Miles was now paired with New Zealander Denny Hulme after Ruby had been injured in a plane crash a month earlier. The third car was the all-Kiwi pairing of Bruce McLaren and Chris Amon. Holman & Moody, the successful Ford NASCAR race team also brought another trio of GT40s as backups, – for Mark Donohue/Paul Hawkins, Ronnie Bucknum/Dick Hutcherson, and Lucien Bianchi/Mario Andretti. One of the big improvements Holman & Moody brought with them was a quick-change brake pad system to save time in the pits.

The British team Alan Mann Racing had two Mk.II cars prepared by Ford Advanced Vehicles, for Graham Hill/Dick Thompson and John Whitmore/Frank Gardner. Each of the eight cars was painted in a colour from the Mustang road-car range.

Ferrari's response to the Mk II was the new Ferrari 330 P3. Shorter and wider than the P2, it kept the same 4-litre engine but with fuel-injection now put out 420 bhp. The works team had a pair of closed-cockpit versions for John Surtees/Ludovico Scarfiotti and former winners Lorenzo Bandini/Jean Guichet. An open-cockpit variant was given to the North American Racing Team (NART) for Pedro Rodriguez/Richie Ginther. But their race preparation had been limited by strike action in Italy.

NART also entered a long-tailed P2, rebodied by Piero Drogo and driven by last year's winner Masten Gregory with Bob Bondurant. There were also P2/P3 hybrids for the Ecurie Francorchamps (Dumay/"Beurlys") and Scuderia Filipinetti (Mairesse/Müller). Finally there was a P2 Spyder for Maranello Concessionaires (Attwood/Piper). Fighting on two fronts, the company also took on the new Porsche 906 in the 2-litre prototype class with its Dino 206 S with a pair from NART, and another for Maranello. Nino Vaccarella, race winner in 1964, was furious when he found out he was ‘demoted’ to drive the Dino rather than the P3 and threatened to walk out, but did, in the end run the car.

Chevrolet as engine supplier was the other player in the over 2-litre class. Ex-Ferrari engineer Giotto Bizzarrini had fallen out with Renzo Rivolta and with his own company brought his new design, the P538, but still using the 5.3L Chevrolet engine. The other Chevy was in Texan Jim Hall's Chaparral 2D. The 5.3L small block put out 420 bhp and had a semi-automatic transmission. Driven by Phil Hill and Jo Bonnier, they made a big impact winning the 1000km Nürburgring round just two weeks earlier.

Porsche came with a new model – the Porsche 906 Carrera 6 designed by the team led by Ferdinand Piëch. With the 2.0L flat-6 engine from the 911 replacing the F4 of the Porsche 904 Carrera GTS, and carrying over some parts of the two-year-old design, it was intended mainly for sale to customers racing for Sportcars class wins. By May 1966 it was homologated for Group 4 as the requisite 50 cars were made. The standard model was race-proven too, after winning the 1966 Targa Florio the month before after the prototype version were crashed by infighting pilots. Three cars were entered in the S 2.0 class where no opposition showed up as the Ferrari Dino 206 S never was homologated, and older models from Alfa, Lotus etc. were inferior. In the P 2.0 prototype class, modifications were permitted, but the fuel-injected 906E was absent. Three regular carburettor engine prototypes fitted with "langheck" (long-tail) bodies were entered by the works team, driven by Hans Herrmann/Herbert Linge, Jo Siffert/Colin Davis and Udo Schütz/Peter de Klerk.

Alfa Romeo, and its works team Autodelta, had withdrawn from racing for a year to prepare a new car for 1967. But this year, a significant new manufacturer entered the fray: Matra had bought out Automobiles René Bonnet in 1964, rebadging the Djet as Matra. However it was a new design that was entered as prototype. Formula One had "returned to power", doubling engine size from 1500cc in 1965 to 3000cc in 1966. The BRM V8 Formula 1 engine could only be enlarged to approx. 2.1 litre, not enough for current F1, thus it was moved to endurance racing. The M620 had a 1.9-litre version of the BRM V8 Formula 1 engine developing 245 bhp that could match the Porsches in speed, making 275 kp/h (170 mph). The three cars were driven by up and coming young French single-seater drivers Jean-Pierre Beltoise/Johnny Servoz-Gavin, Jean-Pierre Jaussaud/Henri Pescarolo, and Jo Schlesser, with Welshman Alan Rees.

Remarkably, given British dominance of the race barely a decade earlier, there were only three British cars in this year's race. Defending class-champions Austin-Healey had two works entries. The other was a Marcos Engineering kit-car based on a Mini Cooper 'S' chassis. Entered by Frenchman Hubert Giraud and driven by Jean-Louis Marnat and Claude Ballot-Léna, the team was able to get a works engine and gearbox from BMC. The spectators laughed at the small car and its apparent resemblance to a flea. But the Mini Marcos would become the 'darling of the crowds' later on in the race.

Alpine, after its poor showing in the previous year, returned with 6 cars. The new A210 had a 1.3L Gordini-Renault engine with a Porsche gearbox making it more durable if only a little faster at 245 kp/h (150 mph). This year a new customer team, the Ecurie Savin-Calberson was supported by Alpine, with former Index winner Roger Delageneste.

Charles Deutsch (CD) brought his new aerodynamic SP66. The car was powered by a 1130cc Peugeot engine, marking the return of the French company last seen in the 1938 race. Another competitor in the small prototypes was ASA. Originally a Ferrari design by Carlo Chiti and Giotto Bizzarrini before their famous walk-out from Ferrari, it was sold to the new Italian company and uprated with a 1290cc engine giving 125 bhp. Two cars were entered, one by ASA and one by NART.

The new Group 4 Sportscar category started attracting interest as the earlier prototypes were meeting the homologation and production requirements. There were six Ford GT40 Mk.I entered by customer teams, with the 4.7L engine. Jochen Rindt, the previous year's winner in a then-prototype Ferrari 250 LM that was now eligible as Gr.4 S 5.0, had moved across from Ferrari to Ford, in the new Canadian Comstock Racing Team. They joined Ford France, Scuderia Filipinetti and new privateers Scuderia Bear and Essex Wire. Joining Skip Scott, team owner of the Essex Wire team, was a 21-year old Jacky Ickx in his Le Mans debut.

Up against them was Ed Hugus’ modified Ferrari 275 GTB and the Equipe Nationale Belge ran its 250 LM. Porsche also ran three regular Porsche 906 unopposed in the Sports 2.0 category, two works entries as well as one for their Paris importer Sonauto of Toto Veuillet.

With Shelby now fully concentrated on the Ford GT40 Mk. II program, the Cobra GTs were abandoned. There were only three GT entries: the Ferrari customer teams Écurie Francorchamps and Maranello Concessionaires both entered a Ferrari 275 GTB. The third was a quiet though significant entry: Jacques Dewes, ever the pioneering privateer, brought the first Porsche 911 to Le Mans. Production of what would become the ubiquitous Le Mans car had started in late 1964, and along with the development of similar engine in the Porsche 906, the new 1967 911 S model had its 2.0 litre ‘boxer’ flat-6-cylinder tuned to 160 bhp.

Finally, in a sub competition of its own, there was the tire race between Firestone, Dunlop, and Goodyear.

== Test weekend ==
Once again there was rain at the April testing weekend. And once again there was tragedy with a fatal accident. American Walt Hansgen's Ford hit water on the pit straight and aquaplaned. He aimed for the escape road at the end of the straight, not realising it was blocked by a sandbank, which he hit at about 190 km/h (120 mph). Taken with critical injuries to the American military hospital at Orléans, he died five days later.

A notable absentee at the test weekend was the Ferrari works team. Chris Amon was fastest at the test weekend in the experimental Ford J-car with a 3:34.4 lap.

== Practice ==
Come race-week it was Gurney who put in the fastest qualifying lap of 3:30.6, a second faster than his stablemates Miles, Gardner and McLaren. Ginther was 5th in the fastest Ferrari with a 3:33.0, with Parkes and Bandini in 7th and 8th respectively. Phil Hill, in the Chaparral, broke up the Ford-Ferrari procession in 10th.

In the 2.0 litre classes, Jo Siffert put the quickest Porsche 22nd on the grid with 3:51.0, with Nino Vaccarella's Ferrari Dino in 24th (3:53.5) and Jo Schlesser's Matra just behind it (3:53.5). Over the test weekend, Mauro Bianchi had surprised many in the 1-litre Alpine, going as fast as the 1959 Ferrari Testa Rossas. The quickest Alpine in practice was Toivonen/Jansson (4:20.1), well ahead of the best CD (Ogier/Laurent 4:27.5) and the Austin-Healey's (4:45.1) and ASAs (4:49.8).

There were also two significant dramas in practice. The biggest news was the walkout of Ferrari's lead driver John Surtees. He and team manager Eugenio Dragoni had decided that he, as the fastest Ferrari driver and driving with Mike Parkes, would act as the hare to bait and break the Fords. He was also still recovering from a big accident the previous year and would hand over to Scarfiotti if he got overly tired. Yet during raceweek, with news that new FIAT chairman Gianni Agnelli would be at the race, Dragoni changed the plan, putting Agnelli's nephew Scarfiotti in first, a case of nepotism. Surtees was furious and stormed off to Maranello to argue his case with Enzo Ferrari. Not listened to, Surtees, Ferrari's 1964 F1 World Champion, quit the team.

The second incident was more serious – Dick Thompson in the Alan Mann Ford Mk II collided with Dick Holqvist who was going far slower in the Scuderia Bear Ford GT40 Mk.I and pulled right in front of him at Maison Blanche. Holqvist spun off with heavy damage, while Thompson was able to get back to the pits. While repairing the damage, officials told the team that they were disqualified for Thompson leaving the scene of a major accident. Thompson was adamant he had advised pit officials, and in the hearing Ford's director of racing Leo Beebe threatened to withdraw all Fords. He was supported by Huschke von Hanstein who was prepared to withdraw the Porsche team as well. In the end, the car was reinstated though Thompson was banned. This still posed a problem for Ford as they were lacking spare drivers for their fleet of entries, with injuries to A. J. Foyt (fire crash at June 1966 Milwaukee Mile), Jackie Stewart (crashed at the 1966 Belgian Grand Prix) and Lloyd Ruby (spinal injuries in a plane crash). In the end Australian Brian Muir, who was in England, was flown over to France. He did his two laps, his first ever at Le Mans, on raceday morning to qualify.

== Race ==
=== Start ===
American businessman Henry Ford II was the honorary starter. Last-minute rain resulted in tire changes and some cars switched from Firestone to Goodyear or Dunlop. At the end of the first lap Ford's cars led – Hill ahead of Gurney then Bucknum, Parkes in the Ferrari, followed by Whitmore's Ford, the Chaparral, then the GT40s of Scott and Rindt. There had been instant excitement when Edgar Berney spun his Bizzarrini on the start-line amongst the crowd of departing cars. Miles had to pit after the first lap to fix his door because earlier, he had slammed the door on his helmet. Also pitting on the first lap was Paul Hawkins whose Ford broke a halfshaft going down the Mulsanne Straight lurching him sideways at nearly 350 km/h. The Holman & Moody crew took 70 minutes to repair it only for Mark Donohue to have the rear boot blow off down the Mulsanne and find the differential had been terminally damaged.

On the third lap Gurney took the lead, which he held onto until the first pit-stops. McLaren was being delayed by his tires going off, so the team quietly changed from Firestones to Goodyears. After only 9 laps, Rindt's Ford blew its engine at the end of the Mulsanne straight, so there would be no consecutive win. At the end of the first hour Fords were 1-2-3, with Gurney leading by 24 seconds from Graham Hill and Bucknum. Fourth, 20 seconds further back, was the first NART Ferrari, of Rodriguez. Meanwhile, Miles had been putting in extremely fast laps, breaking the lap record and getting back up to 5th place. Parkes was 6th ahead of Bonnier in the Chaparral who had already been lapped. Within another hour Miles and Hulme had taken the lead.

At 8pm, only the Miles and Gurney Fords and Rodriguez's Ferrari were on the lead lap (#64). At dusk it started to drizzle, reducing the power advantage of the big Fords, and allowing the Ferraris to keep in touch. The Fords were further delayed as a number chose to change brake pads early. By then all three Dinos were out with mechanical issues, removing one threat to Porsche. A major accident occurred when Jean-Claude Ogier's CD got loose on spilt oil at the Mulsanne kink and was hit hard side-on by François Pasquier in the NART ASA. Both cars hit the wall and caught fire, and Ogier was taken to the hospital with two broken arms.

=== Night ===
After 6 hours, heavy rain was pouring down. Ginther's NART Ferrari was leading from Parkes, chased by the Fords of Miles and Gurney on the same lap, McLaren a lap behind, then Bandini and Andretti two laps back. But Andretti was soon sidelined with a blown headgasket, as was the Hill/Muir Ford which had broken its front suspension coming out of Arnage corner. As the rain eased, the Fords of Miles and Gurney retook the lead. Just before midnight Robert Buchet aquaplaned coming over the crest at the Dunlop Bridge and crashed the French Porsche. The Chaparral had been running well initially, getting as high as 5th, until a broken alternator stopped them also just before midnight while running in 8th.

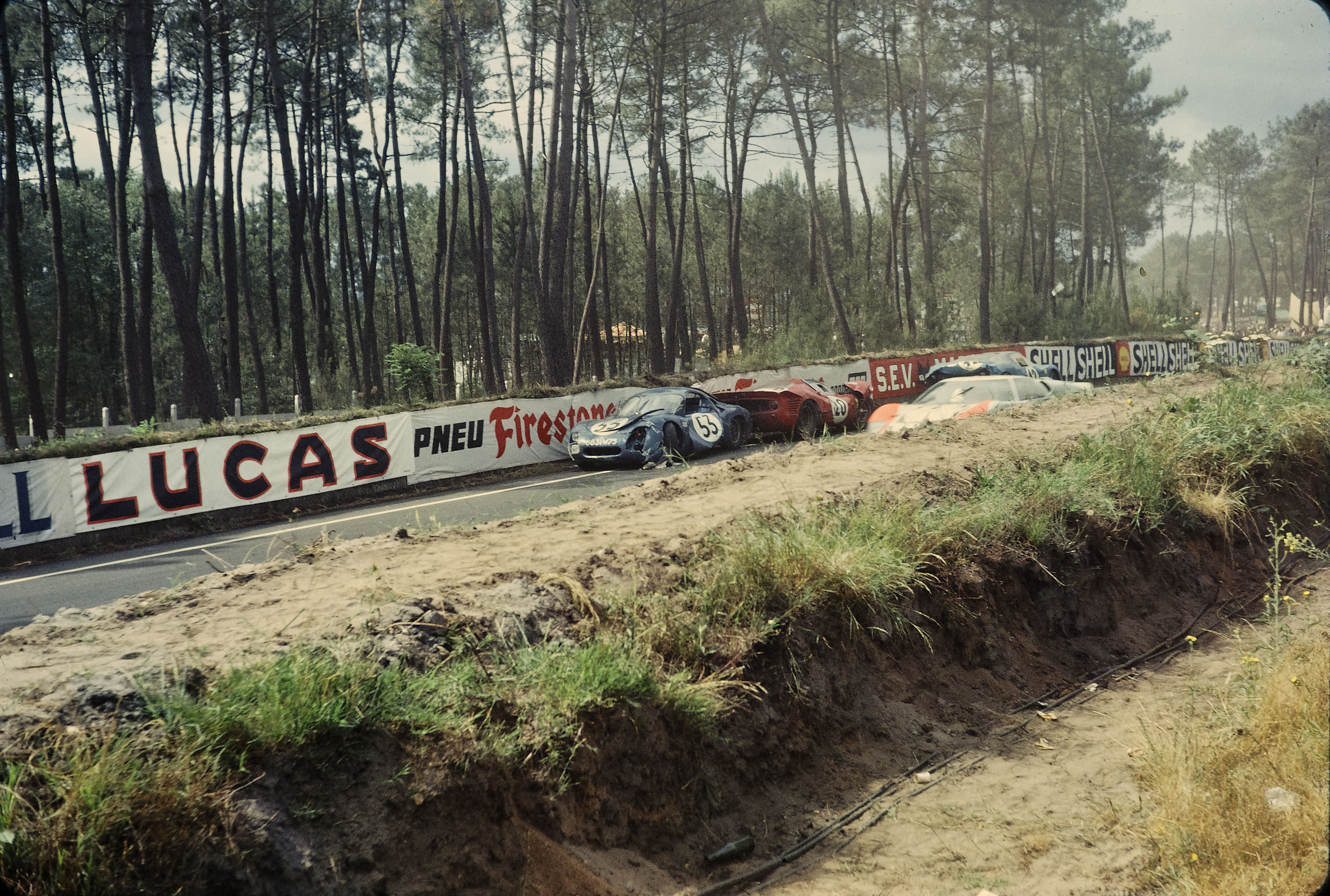
The aftermath of the nighttime accident at the Esses which resulted in the retirement of cars #20, #34, #42, and #53.

Another heavy downpour at 12.30 contributed to a big accident in the Esses. Guichet had just spun his Ferrari in the rain and got away when Buchet arrived and crashed his Porsche. Then Schlesser's Matra ran into the CD of Georges Heligouin avoiding the accident. As the damage was being cleared, Scarfiotti crashed his P3 into the Matra and all four cars were wrecked, although only Scarfiotti was taken to hospital, with minor bruising.

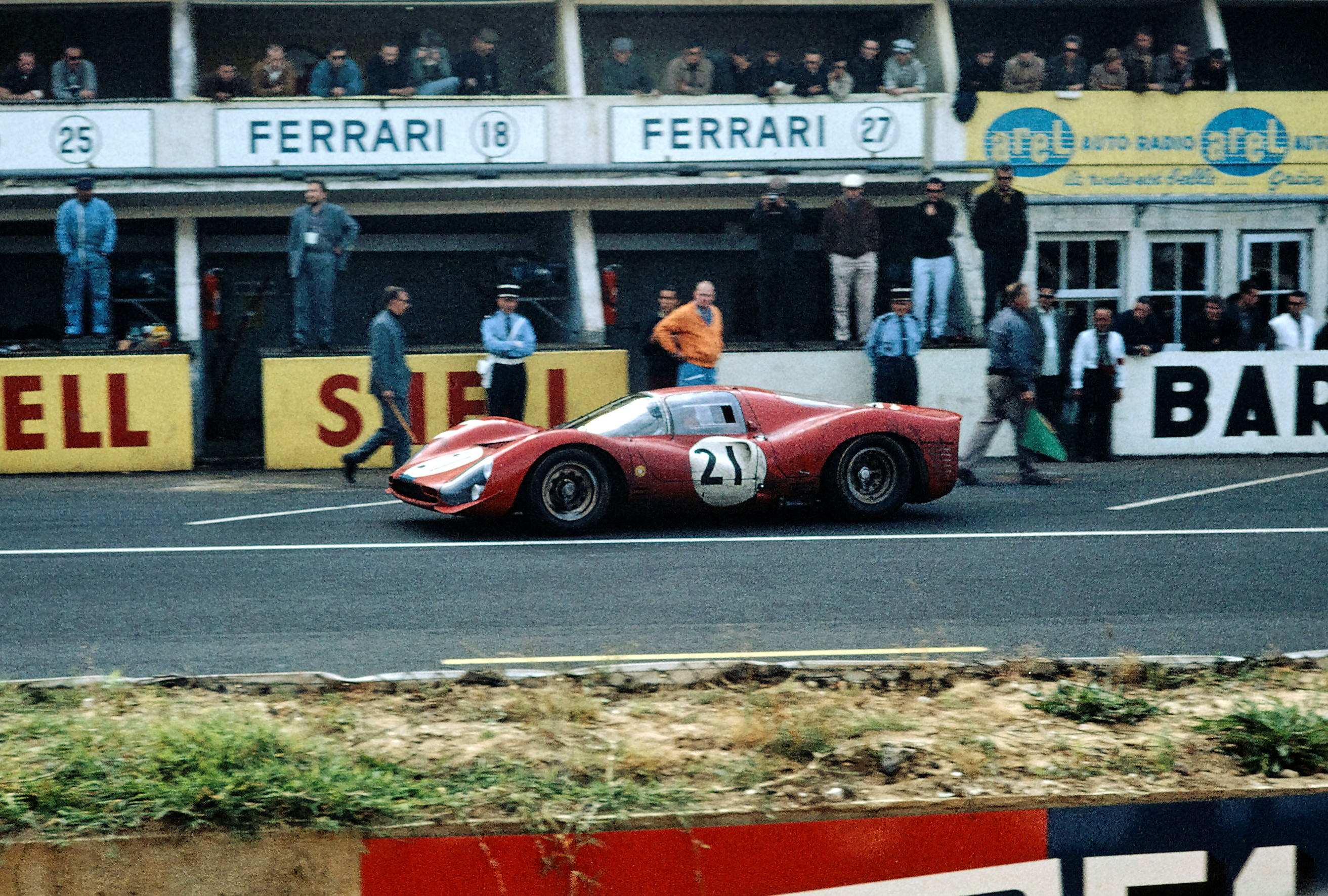
The Ferrari 330 P3 of Bandini/Guichet, which retired after 17 hours.

During the night the Ferraris started to suffer from overheating. When the NART P3 retired from 4th with a broken gearbox at 3am, and the Filipinetti car of Mairesse/Müller from 5th an hour later, the Ferrari challenge was spent – there would be no privateer-saviours for the marque this year. At halfway, Ford GT40s held the first 6 places: the Mk IIs held the top-4 places (Miles/Hulme, Gurney/Grant, McLaren/Amon, Bucknum/Hutcherson) with the Mk Is in 5-6-8: Essex, Filipinetti and Ford-France (Revson/Scott, Spoerry/Sutcliffe, Ligier/Grossman). Siffert/Davis were leading a train of Porsches in 7th and the nearest Ferrari was the Bandini/Guichet P3 limping in 12th. Ford told their cars to drop to 4-minute laps, but Gurney and Miles kept racing hard for the lead.

=== Morning ===
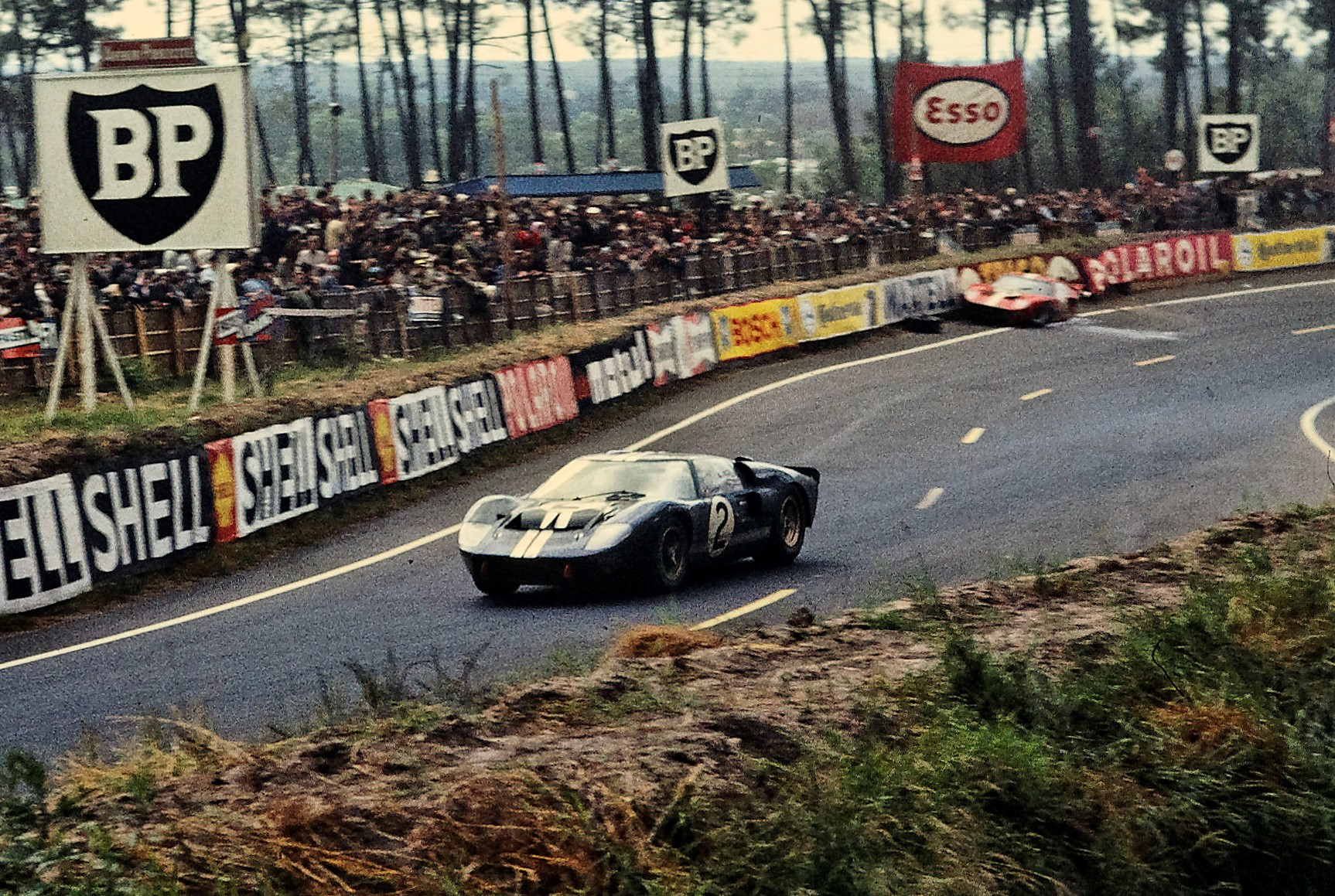
The #2 GT40 of McLaren/Amon passes the wrecked #14 GT40 of Spoerry/Sutcliffe at the Esses.

What could have been a procession was anything but for Ford. At 8 am, a pit-stop for the Filipinetti Ford running 5th spilled petrol on a rear tyre. On his out-lap Spoerry lost traction and spun at the Esses wrecking the car. The Ford France and Essex cars had already retired with engine issues during the night.

At 9am the Gurney/Grant car, which had been dicing for the lead with Miles & Hulme (against strict team orders), retired from 1st when the car blew a headgasket. That left Ford with only three Mk IIs left (albeit running 1-2-3) as all the GT40 Mk Is had retired as well. Porsches now held the next five places and the two Ferrari GTs were 9th and 10th chased by the Alpines.

=== Three Ford "photo" finish - ACO declares winner ===
At about the 6 hour mark (to the finish) it was clear that Miles / Hulme and McLaren/Amon were set to win, a "PR" plan was developed to have all three Ford cars cross the finish line together to thus commemorate the historical first Ford / USA victory at Le Mans. The notion was supported by Carrol Shelby as a means to totally "beat" Ferrari.

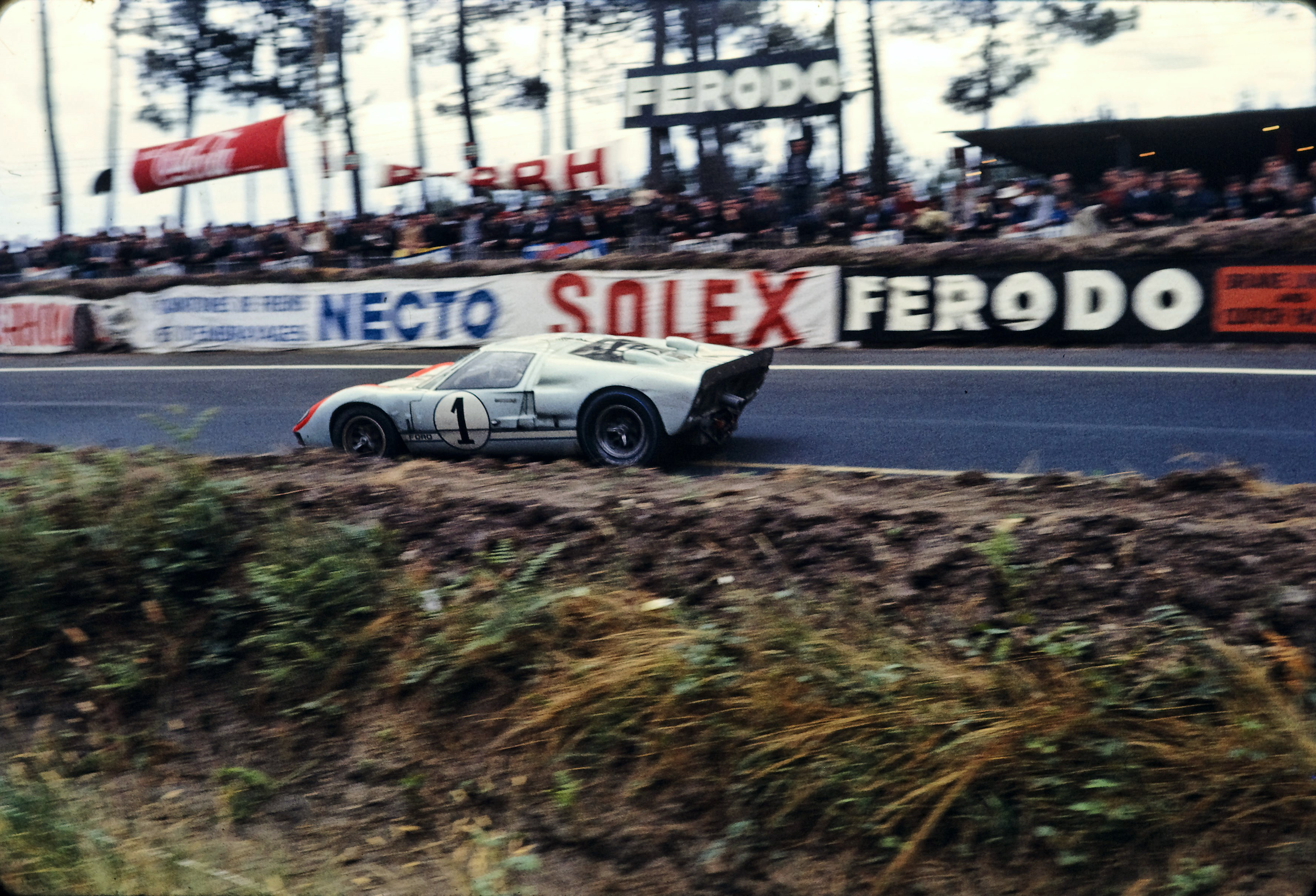
The GT40 of Miles/Hulme, who finished 2nd overall

At the 3 hour mark during the last driver change (Amon to McLaren) and (Hulme to Miles), Miles was directly instructed to slow down and allow McLaren to catch up to allow for a "dead heat finish". Miles and his crew team were upset but agreed. Accordingly, on the final lap the next car from Ford driven by Bruce McLaren/Chris Amon and the third-place car from Ford drew up, and they cruised to the line together. Miles's #1 car and McLaren's #2 car crossed the finish line almost at the same time, with photos and official track data showing McLaren's #2 as 6 metres ahead when crossing the line. Additionally, McLaren's #2 started just over 14 metres behind Miles's car and had therefore covered more distance during the race; the official rules regarding cars finishing together indicate that starting position should be taken into account, so McLaren was declared the winner.

This was all unbeknownst to the Ford team. They were under the impression that Miles had "won" the race, but McLaren was indeed declared the 1966 Le Mans winner. In a 1997 interview Shelby lamented the ACO "made up rule" and that indeed "Ken Miles won the race" and feelings of guilt about what had occurred.

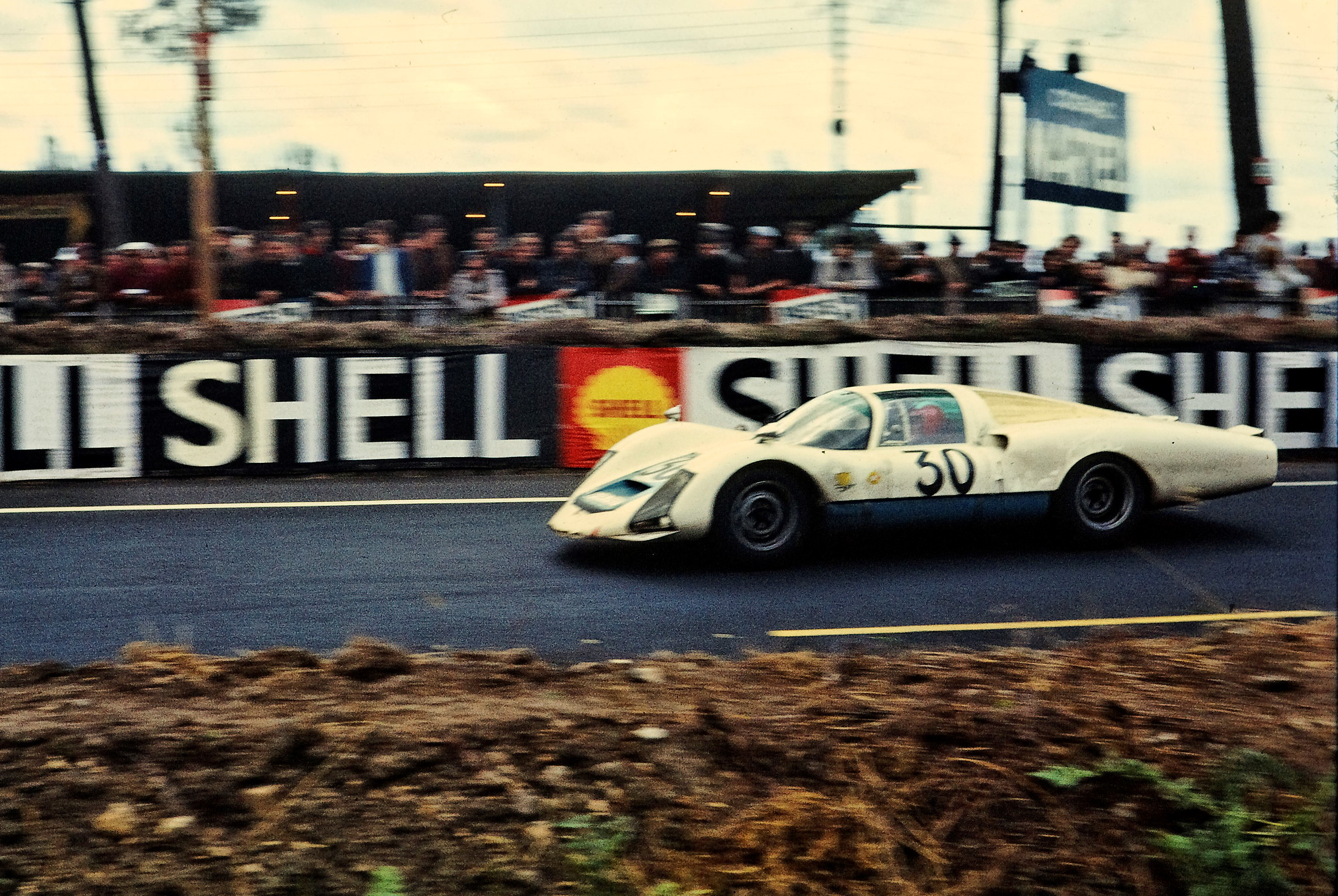
The Porsche 906/6 LH of Siffert/Davis, which finished 4th overall, won the 2.0 liter prototype class and claimed the index of performance.

At their last pitstop, the 7th-placed Gr.4 Porsche of Peter Gregg and Sten Axelsson was stopped by engine problems. Gregg parked the car waiting for the last lap, but at 3.50pm he could not get it restarted, missed the formation finish and was DNF. The other four Porsches came in 4th to 7th led by Siffert/Davis, who also claimed the Index of Performance. The Stommelen/Klass car in 7th was the first, and only, Sports car to finish, beating all Mk.I and Ferrari. Finally, the new 911S GT car ran well and finished 14th starting a long record of success.

Four Alpines finished this year, 9-11-12-13, with that of Delageneste/Cheinisse from the Ecurie Savin-Calberson winning the Thermal Efficiency Index. The final finisher was the little Mini Marcos. Formerly the object of laughter, it had become a crowd favourite running like clockwork. As car after car ran into trouble and dropped out, the little Marcos, by this time nicknamed 'la puce bleue' (the blue flea) wailed on. Despite finishing 26 laps behind the rest of the field. the car eventually came home at an incredible 15th overall.

It had taken three attempts for Ford to win Indianapolis in '65 and the NASCAR Championship, and now it added the Le Mans 24 Hours, with the Ford-Cosworth DFV Formula One engine in development. Chrysler had first entered in 1925, and after these 41 years it was the first win for an American car. The official Ford press release, dated July 5, 1966, claimed:

The McLaren-Amon and the Miles-Hulme cars were running within seconds of each other as the race neared its end, with the Bucknum-Hutcherson car hanging back as insurance. A decision was made in the Ford pits to have the cars finish side by side in what hopefully would be considered a dead heat. All three cars went over the finish in formation, but any chance for a dead heat disappeared when officials discovered a rule that in case of a tie, the car that had started further down the grid had travelled the farther distance. Since McLaren and Amon had started 60 feet behind Miles and Hulme, they were declared the winners. Both New Zealanders who now reside in England, it was the most important victory yet for the two youngsters. McLaren, who builds his own Formula and sports cars, is 28. Amon 22, is the youngest winner in the history of the event. It was a record shattering performance as the winning car covered more miles (3,009.3) at a faster speed (125.38 mph) than any previous entry. It demonstrated that production engines could compete with racing powerplants and that an American-built car could top Europe's best.

The Ford team's decision was a big disappointment for Ken Miles, who was aiming for the 'endurance racing Triple Crown'—winning Daytona-Sebring-Le Mans—as a reward for his investment in the GT40 development. "I'm disappointed, of course, but what are you going to do about it." Beebe also later admitted he had been annoyed with Miles racing Gurney, disregarding team orders by potentially risking the cars' endurance. Two months later, Ken Miles died at Riverside while testing the next generation Ford GT40 J-Car, which became the Mk IV that won Le Mans in 1967.

In a race of attrition it was fortunate the big teams brought such quantity – only 3 of the 13 Fords finished, and only the two GTs finished from the 14 Ferraris entered. By contrast, 5 of the 7 Porsches finished (including their 911 in the GT class), as did four of the six Alpines, showing much better reliability. It was the first time that the 3000 miles/125 mph mark had been exceeded.

With the bitter failure of Ferrari's 330 P3 mirroring the failure of the Ford prototypes the previous year (and with salt rubbed into the wound with Ford's formation finish), the "Ford-Ferrari War" moved into its climactic phase. The Le Mans results boosted Ford over Ferrari for the 1966 Manufacturers' Championship. Ford's answer to Ferrari's next weapon, the 330 P4, was delayed by development problems, handing Ferrari a rematch with the Mk IIs that so dominated them at Le Mans, at the 1967 Daytona 24 Hours. After a defective batch of transaxle shafts sank Ford's effort, Ferrari took a 1-2-3 finish with their new P4s and returned the favor of Ford's victory formation. Ford's Mark IV was ready in time for the 12 Hours of Sebring, where it won on its maiden outing. Three more examples were produced and prepared for the Le Mans 24 Hours, while Ford's championship hopes rested on the older Ford GT40 and the new GT40-derived Mirage M1 to gain points in the intervening races. After a disappointing showing at Monza and a controversial denial of championship points from a Mirage win at the Spa event, Ford saw limited opportunity for taking the Manufacturers' title again in 1967 and instead concentrated on a last hurrah at Le Mans, where the leading Mark IV, driven by Dan Gurney and A. J. Foyt, won handily. Ferrari took the Manufacturers' title for 1967, edging up-and-coming Porsche by two points.

The Ford-Ferrari War was ended by new rules for 1968 that eliminated large capacity engines as in the P4s and Mark IVs from eligibility for the Sports Prototype class with a 3-litre engine capacity limit, as in Formula One. The GT40 Mk.I already in 1966 had met the production requirement for homologation in the new Group 4 class, and fitted under the 5 litre limit for 1968. Ferrari found the production requirement for homologating the P4 under Group 4 daunting and withdrew from competition in the sport-racer classes. Neither Ford nor Ferrari fielded a factory team for the Manufacturers' Championship that year; however, the John Wyer team running the Group 4 Ford GT40 Mk.I with permitted updates brought home the title for Ford and in 1969 achieved wins with the GT40 at Sebring and a fourth time at Le Mans. When Ferrari was able to enter the homologated 512S car for 1970, the class they competed in was already dominated by the Porsche 917.

Several cars of the original 24-hours race have survived and have been restored to their former glory. The crowd-pleasing Mini Marcos was club raced, rallied and hill climbed, road registered twice and repainted five times only to be stolen in the night of 30 October 1975 from beneath a flat in Paris. Three days earlier Marcos-boss Harold Dermott had made a deal to buy the car with the intention to restore it and put on museum display. Several people searched for the car ever since, but it was only found back in December 2016 in Portugal by Dutchman Jeroen Booij.

== Official results ==
=== Finishers ===
Results taken from Quentin Spurring's book, officially licensed by the ACO Class Winners are in Bold text.

Pos	Class	No	Team	Drivers	Chassis	Engine	Laps
1	P +5.0	**2**	(United States) **Ford Motor Company** (United States) **Shelby American**	(New Zealand) **Bruce McLaren** (New Zealand) **Chris Amon**	Ford GT40 Mk.II	Ford 7.0L V8	360
2	P +5.0	1	(United States) Ford Motor Company (United States) Shelby American	(United Kingdom) Ken Miles (New Zealand) Denny Hulme	Ford GT40 Mk.II	Ford 7.0L V8	360
3	P +5.0	5	(United States) Ford Motor Company (United States) Holman & Moody	(United States) Ronnie Bucknum (United States) Dick Hutcherson	Ford GT40 Mk.II	Ford 7.0L V8	348
4	P 2.0	**30**	(Germany) **Porsche System**; **Engineering**	(Switzerland) **Jo Siffert** (United Kingdom) **Colin Davis**	Porsche 906/6 LH	Porsche 1991cc F6	339
5	P 2.0	31	(Germany) Porsche System; Engineering	(Germany) Hans Herrmann (Germany) Herbert Linge	Porsche 906/6 LH	Porsche 1991cc F6	338
6	P 2.0	32	(Germany) Porsche System; Engineering	(Germany) Udo Schütz (South Africa) Peter de Klerk	Porsche 906/6 LH	Porsche 1991cc F6	337
7	S 2.0	**58** (reserve)	(Germany) **Porsche System**; **Engineering**	(Germany) **Günter Klass** (Germany) **Rolf Stommelen**	Porsche 906/6 Carrera 6	Porsche 1991cc F6	330
8	GT 5.0	**29**	(United Kingdom) **Maranello Concessionaires**	(United Kingdom) **Piers Courage** (United States) **Roy Pike**	Ferrari 275 GTB; Competizione	Ferrari 3.3L V12	313
9	P 1.3	**62** (reserve)	(France) **Société Automobiles**; **Alpine**	(France) **Henri Grandsire** (Italy) **Leo Cella**	Alpine A210	Renault-Gordini 1296cc S4	311
10	GT 5.0	57 (reserve)	(Belgium) Ecurie Francorchamps	(Belgium) Pierre Noblet (Belgium) Claude Dubois	Ferrari 275 GTB; Competizione	Ferrari 3.3L V12	310
11	P 1.3	44	(France) Ecurie Savin-Calberson	(France) Roger Delageneste (France) Jacques Cheinisse	Alpine A210	Renault-Gordini 1296cc S4	307
12	P 1.3	45	(France) Société Automobiles; Alpine	(France) Robert Bouharde (France) Guy Verrier	Alpine A210	Renault-Gordini 1296cc S4	307
13	P 1.3	46	(France) Société Automobiles; Alpine	(Switzerland) Mauro Bianchi (France) Jean Vinatier	Alpine A210	Renault-Gordini 1296cc S4	306
14	GT 2.0	**35**	(France) **J. Franc** (private entrant)	(France) **"Franc" (Jacques Dewes)** (France) **Jean Kerguen**	Porsche 911S	Porsche 1991cc F6	284
15	P 1.3	50	(France) J-L Marnat & Cie (private entrant)	(France) Jean-Louis Marnat (France) Claude Ballot-Léna	Mini Marcos GT 2+2	BMC 1287cc S4	258

=== Did not finish ===
Pos	Class	No	Team	Drivers	Chassis	Engine	Laps	Reason
DNF	S 2.0	33	(Germany) Porsche System; Engineering	(United States) Peter Gregg (Sweden) Sten Axelsson	Porsche 906/6 Carrera 6	Porsche 1991cc F6	321	Engine (24hr)
DNF	P +5.0	3	(United States) Ford Motor Company (United States) Shelby American	(United States) Dan Gurney (United States) Jerry Grant	Ford GT40 Mk.II	Ford 7.0L V8	257	Radiator (18hr)
DNF	P 1.3	49	(United Kingdom) Donald Healey Motor Company	(United Kingdom) Paddy Hopkirk (United Kingdom) Andrew Hedges	Austin-Healey Sprite	BMC 1293cc S4	237	Head gasket (21hr)
DNF	S 5.0	14	(Switzerland) Scuderia Filipinetti	(Switzerland) Dieter Spoerry (United Kingdom) Peter Sutcliffe	Ford GT40 Mk.I	Ford 4.7L V8	233	Accident (17hr)
DNF	P 4.0	21	(Italy) SpA Ferrari SEFAC	(Italy) Lorenzo Bandini (France) Jean Guichet	Ferrari 330 P3	Ferrari 4.0L V12	226	Engine (17hr)
DNF	S 5.0	26	(United States) E. Hugus (private entrant)	(Italy) Giampiero Biscaldi (France) Prince Michel de Bourbon-Parma	Ferrari 275 GTB; Competizione	Ferrari 3.3L V12	218	Clutch (20hr)
DNF	S 5.0	28	(Belgium) Equipe Nationale Belge	(Belgium) Gustave ‘Taf’ Gosselin (Belgium) Eric de Keyn	Ferrari 250 LM	Ferrari 3.3L V12	218	Engine (18hr)
DNF	P 1.3	47	(France) Société Automobiles; Alpine	(Sweden) Berndt Jansson (Finland) Pauli Toivonen	Alpine A210	Renault 1296cc S4	217	Gearbox (21hr)
DNF	S 5.0	59 (reserve)	(United States) Essex Wire Corporation	(United States) Peter Revson (United States) Skip Scott	Ford GT40 Mk.I	Ford 4.7L V8	212	Engine (15hr)
DNF	S 5.0	15	Ford France S.A.	(France) Guy Ligier (United States) Bob Grossman	Ford GT40 Mk.I	Ford 4.7L V8	205	Ignition (16hr)
DNF	P 5.0	19	(Switzerland) Scuderia Filipinetti	(Belgium) Willy Mairesse (Switzerland) Herbert Müller	Ferrari 365 P2	Ferrari 4.4L V12	166	Gearbox (12hr)
DNF	S 5.0	60 (reserve)	(United States) Essex Wire Corporation	(Germany) Jochen Neerpasch (Belgium) Jacky Ickx	Ford GT40 Mk.I	Ford 4.7L V8	154	Engine (11hr)
DNF	P 4.0	27	(United States) North American Racing Team	(United States) Richie Ginther (Mexico) Pedro Rodríguez	Ferrari 330 P3 Spyder	Ferrari 4.0L V12	151	Gearbox (11hr)
DNF	P 1.3	48	(United Kingdom) Donald Healey Motor Company	(United Kingdom) John Rhodes (United Kingdom) Clive Baker	Austin-Healey Sprite Le Mans	BMC 1293cc S4	134	Clutch (16hr)
DNF	P 5.0	17	(Belgium) Ecurie Francorchamps	(Belgium) "Beurlys" (Jean Blaton) (France) Pierre Dumay	Ferrari 365 P2	Ferrari 4.4L V12	129	Engine (14hr)
DNF	P 4.0	20	(Italy) SpA Ferrari SEFAC	(Italy) Ludovico Scarfiotti (United Kingdom) Mike Parkes	Ferrari 330 P3	Ferrari 4.0L V12	123	Accident (9hr)
DNF	P 1.15	55	(France) Société Automobiles; Alpine	(France) André de Cortanze (France) Jean-Pierre Hanrioud	Alpine A210	Renault-Gordini 1005cc S4	118	Water pump (20hr)
DNF	P 2.0	41	(France) Matra Sport	(France) Johnny Servoz-Gavin (France) Jean-Pierre Beltoise	Matra MS620	BRM 1915cc V8	112	Gearbox (13hr)
DNF	P +5.0	9	(United States) Chaparral Cars	(United States) Phil Hill (Sweden) Jo Bonnier	Chaparral 2D	Chevrolet 5.4L V8	111	Electrics (8hr)
DNF	P +5.0	7	(United States) Ford Motor Company (United Kingdom) Alan Mann Racing	(United Kingdom) Graham Hill (Australia) Brian Muir	Ford GT40 Mk.II	Ford 7.0L V8	110	Front suspension (8hr)
DNF	S 2.0	34	(France) Auguste Veuillet	(France) Robert Buchet (Germany) Gerhard 'Gerd' Koch	Porsche 906/6 Carrera 6	Porsche 1991cc F6	110	Accident (9hr)
DNF	P 2.0	42	(France) Matra Sport	(France) Jo Schlesser (United Kingdom) Alan Rees	Matra MS620	BRM 1915cc V8	100	Accident (9hr)
DNF	P +5.0	6	(United States) Ford Motor Company (United States) Holman & Moody	(United States) Mario Andretti (Belgium) Lucien Bianchi	Ford GT40 Mk.II	Ford 7.0L V8	97	Head gasket (8hr)
DNF	P 1.15	53	(France) Automobiles CD	(France) Georges Heligouin (France) Jean ‘Johnny’ Rives	CD SP66	Peugeot 1130cc S4	91	Accident (9hr)
DNF	P 5.0	18	(United States) North American Racing Team	(United States) Masten Gregory (United States) Bob Bondurant	Ferrari 365 P2	Ferrari 4.4L V12	88	Transmission (9hr)
DNF	P 1.15	51	(France) Automobiles CD	(France) Claude Laurent (France) Jean-Claude Ogier	CD SP66	Peugeot 1130cc S4	54	Accident (6hr)
DNF	P 1.3	54	(United States) North American Racing Team	(France) François Pasquier (France) Robert Mieusset	ASA GT RB-613	ASA 1290cc S4	50	Accident (6hr)
DNF	P 5.0	24	(Italy) Scuderia San Marco	(France) Jean-Claude Sauer (France) Jean de Mortemart	Serenissima Spyder	Serenissima 3.5L V8	40	Gearbox (5hr)
DSQ	P +5.0	11	(Italy) Prototipi Bizzarrini	(United States) Sam Posey (Italy) Massimo Natili	Bizzarrini P538 Super America	Chevrolet 5.4L V8	39	Pit violation (5hr)
DNF	P 2.0	43	(France) Matra Sport	(France) Jean-Pierre Jaussaud (France) Henri Pescarolo	Matra MS620	BRM 1915cc V8	38	Oil pump (8hr)
DNF	P 5.0	16	(United Kingdom) Maranello Concessionaires	(United Kingdom) Richard Attwood (United Kingdom) David Piper	Ferrari 365 P2	Ferrari 4.4L V12	33	Water pump (8hr)
DNF	P 1.3	61 (reserve)	(Italy) Autocostruzione Societa per Azione	(Italy) Ignazio Giunti (Italy) Spartaco Dini	ASA GT RB-613	ASA 1290cc S4	31	Transmission (8hr)
DNF	P +5.0	8	(United States) Ford Motor Company (United Kingdom) Alan Mann Racing	(United Kingdom) Sir John Whitmore (Australia) Frank Gardner	Ford GT40 Mk.II	Ford 7.0L V8	31	Clutch (6hr)
DNF	P 1.15	52	(France) Automobiles CD	(France) Pierre Lelong (France) Alain Bertaut	CD SP66	Peugeot 1130cc S4	19	Clutch (6hr)
DNF	P 2.0	36	(United Kingdom) Maranello Concessionaires	(United Kingdom) Mike Salmon (United Kingdom) David Hobbs	Dino 206 S	Ferrari 1986cc V6	14	Rear axle (3hr)
DNF	P +5.0	4	(United States) Ford Motor Company (United States) Holman & Moody	(United States) Mark Donohue (Australia) Paul Hawkins	Ford GT40 Mk.II	Ford 7.0L V8	12	Differential (5hr)
DNF	P 2.0	38	(United States) North American Racing Team	(United States) Charlie Kolb (United States) George Follmer	Dino 206 S	Ferrari 1986cc V6	9	Engine (3hr)
DNF	P +5.0	10	(Italy) Prototipi Bizzarrini	(Switzerland) Edgar Berney (Switzerland) André Wicky	Bizzarrini P538 Sport	Chevrolet 5.4L V8	8	Steering arm (3hr)
DNF	S 5.0	12	(Canada) Comstock Racing (United Kingdom) F.R. English Ltd	(Austria) Jochen Rindt (United Kingdom) Innes Ireland	Ford GT40 Mk.I	Ford 4.7L V8	8	Engine (3hr)
DNF	P 2.0	25	(Italy) Scuderia San Marco (United States) North American Racing Team	(Italy) Nino Vaccarella (Italy) Mario Casoni	Dino 206 S	Ferrari 1986cc V6	7	Water leak (3hr)

=== Did not start ===
Pos	Class	No	Team	Drivers	Chassis	Engine	Reason
DNS	P 1.15	56	(France) Société Automobiles; Alpine	(France) Henri Grandsire (France) André de Cortanze	Alpine A110 M64	Renault-Gordini 1005cc S4	Did not start
DNS	S 5.0	63 (reserve)	(United States) Scuderia Bear	(United States) Dick Holqvist (United States) M.R. Wylie	Ford GT40	Ford 4.7L V8	practice accident
DNA	P 4.0	22	(Italy) SpA Ferrari SEFAC	(Italy) Giancarlo Baghetti (Italy) Umberto Maglioli	Ferrari 330 P3	Ferrari 4.0L V12	Did not arrive
DNA	P 5.0	23	(Italy) Scuderia San Marco	(France) Louis Corbero	Serenissima Spyder	Serenissima 3.5L V8	Did not arrive
DNA	P 2.0	37	(Italy) SpA Ferrari SEFAC	(Italy) Giampiero Biscaldi (Italy) Mario Casoni	Dino 206 S	Ferrari 1986cc V6	Did not arrive
DNA	P 2.0	39	(Italy) P.Dumay (private entrant)	(France) Pierre Dumay (Belgium) Gustave ‘Taf’ Gosselin	Dino 206 S	Ferrari 1986cc V6	Did not arrive
DNA	GT 1.6	44	(Belgium) Equipe Nationale Belge	(Belgium) Georges Harris (Belgium) Gerhard Langlois van Ophem	Alfa Romeo Giulia TZ2	Alfa Romeo 1570cc S4	Did not arrive

=== Class winners ===
Class	Prototype winners		Class	Sports winners		Class	GT winners	
Prototype 5000+	#2 Ford GT40 Mk.II	Amon / McLaren *	Sports 5000+	-		Grand Touring 5000+	no entrants	
Prototype 5000	no finishers		Sports 5000	no finishers		Grand Touring 5000	no entrants	
Prototype 4000	no finishers		Sports 4000	no finishers		Grand Touring 4000	#29 Ferrari 275 GTB; Competizione	Courage / Pike
Prototype 3000	no entrants		Sports 3000	no entrants		Grand Touring 3000	no entrants	
Prototype 2000	#30 Porsche 906/6 LH	Siffert / Davis *	Sports 2000	#58 Porsche 906/6	Stommelen / Klass *	Grand Touring 2000	#35 Porsche 911 S	"Franc" / Kerguen
Prototype 1600	no entrants		Sports 1600	no entrants		Grand Touring 1600	no entrants	
Prototype 1300	#62 Alpine A210 M64	Grandsire / Cella *	Sports 1300	no entrants		Grand Touring 1300	no entrants	
Prototype 1150	no finishers		Sports 1150	no entrants		Grand Touring 1150	no entrants	

* Note: setting a new Distance Record.

=== Index of thermal efficiency ===
Pos	Class	No	Team	Drivers	Chassis	Score
1	P 1.3	44	(France) Ecurie Savin-Calberson	(France) Roger Delageneste (France) Jacques Cheinisse	Alpine A210	1.35
2	P 1.3	46	(France) Société Automobiles; Alpine	(Switzerland) Mauro Bianchi (France) Jean Vinatier	Alpine A210	1.33
3=	P 1.3	45	(France) Société Automobiles; Alpine	(France) Robert Bouharde (France) Guy Verrier	Alpine A210	1.32
3=	P +5.0	1	(United States) Shelby American	(United Kingdom) Ken Miles (New Zealand) Denny Hulme	Ford GT40 Mk.II	1.32
5	P 1.3	62	(France) Société Automobiles; Alpine	(France) Henri Grandsire (Italy) Leo Cella	Alpine A210	1.30
6	P +5.0	2	(United States) Shelby American	(New Zealand) Bruce McLaren (New Zealand) Chris Amon	Ford GT40 Mk.II	1.24
7	P +5.0	5	(United States) Holman & Moody	(United States) Ronnie Bucknum (United States) Dick Hutcherson	Ford GT40 Mk.II	1.14
8	P 2.0	30	(Germany) Porsche System; Engineering	(Switzerland) Jo Siffert (United Kingdom) Colin Davis	Porsche 906/6 LH	1.09
9	P 2.0	31	(Germany) Porsche System; Engineering	(Germany) Hans Herrmann (Germany) Herbert Linge	Porsche 906/6 LH	1.04
10	P 2.0	32	(Germany) Porsche System; Engineering	(Germany) Udo Schütz (South Africa) Peter de Klerk	Porsche 906/6 LH	1.03

- Note: Only the top ten positions are included in this set of standings.

=== Index of performance ===
Taken from Moity's book.

Pos	Class	No	Team	Drivers	Chassis	Score
1	P 2.0	30	(Germany) Porsche System; Engineering	(Switzerland) Jo Siffert (United Kingdom) Colin Davis	Porsche 906/6 LH	1.263
2	P 2.0	31	(Germany) Porsche System; Engineering	(Germany) Hans Herrmann (Germany) Herbert Linge	Porsche 906/6 LH	1.259
3	P 1.3	62	(France) Société Automobiles; Alpine	(France) Henri Grandsire (Italy) Leo Cella	Alpine A210	1.258
4	P 2.0	32	(Germany) Porsche System; Engineering	(Germany) Udo Schütz (South Africa) Peter de Klerk	Porsche 906/6 LH	1.256
5	P 1.3	45	(France) Société Automobiles; Alpine	(France) Robert Bouharde (France) Guy Verrier	Alpine A210	1.240
6	P 1.3	44	(France) Ecurie Savin-Calberson	(France) Roger Delageneste (France) Jacques Cheinisse	Alpine A210	1.239
7	P 1.3	46	(France) Société Automobiles; Alpine	(Switzerland) Mauro Bianchi (France) Jean Vinatier	Alpine A210	1.235
8	S 2.0	58	(Germany) Porsche System; Engineering	(Germany) Günter Klass (Germany) Rolf Stommelen	Porsche 906/6 Carrera 6	1.230
9=	P +5.0	1	(United States) Shelby American	(United Kingdom) Ken Miles (New Zealand) Denny Hulme	Ford GT40 Mk.II	1.204
9=	P +5.0	2	(United States) Shelby American	(New Zealand) Bruce McLaren (New Zealand) Chris Amon	Ford GT40 Mk.II	1.204

- Note: Only the top ten positions are included in this set of standings. A score of 1.00 means meeting the minimum distance for the car, and a higher score is exceeding the nominal target distance.

=== Statistics ===
Taken from Quentin Spurring's book, officially licensed by the ACO

- Fastest Lap in practice – D.Gurney, #3 Ford GT40 Mk II – 3:30.6secs; 230.10 km/h (142.98 mph)
- Fastest Lap – D.Gurney, #3 Ford GT40 Mk II – 3:30.6secs; 230.10 km/h (142.98 mph)
- Distance – 4,843.09 km (3,009.36 mi)
- Winner's Average Speed – 201.80 km/h (125.39 mph)
- Attendance – 350 000

=== Challenge Mondial de Vitesse et Endurance standings ===
As calculated after Le Mans, Round 4 of 4

Pos	Manufacturer	Points
1	(United States) Ford	20
2	(West Germany) Porsche	18
3	(Italy) Ferrari	14
4	(United States) Chaparral	9
5	(Italy) Alfa Romeo	3
6	(France) Alpine	1

== Legacy in popular culture ==
=== Go Like Hell ===
The race became the subject of a 2009 book, detailing the race and the famous background rivalry between Enzo Ferrari and Henry Ford II, by A. J. Baime titled Go Like Hell—the words shouted by Bruce McLaren to Chris Amon as they drove to their famous victory.

Rumors of a movie adaptation of the book, an Amazon best seller, circulated from 2013 to 2015. The book attained a "4.5 star" rating by book review website GoodReads.com.

=== The 24 Hour War ===
A 2016 documentary film, produced and directed by Americans Nate Adams and comedian Adam Carolla, features the Le Mans rivalry between Ferrari and Ford. The production was well received critically, attaining a "86%" rating on review aggregate website Rotten Tomatoes.

=== Ford v Ferrari ===
Ford v Ferrari (known as Le Mans '66 in the UK and other territories) is a sports drama film distributed by 20th Century Fox, based on the rivalry between Ford and Ferrari for dominance at Le Mans. Directed by James Mangold, starring Matt Damon and Christian Bale in the roles of Carroll Shelby and Ken Miles, respectively. The film was released on 15 November 2019. At the 92nd Academy Awards, the film received four nominations, including Best Picture and Best Sound Mixing, and won for Best Sound Editing and Best Film Editing.
