= Alpine A210 =

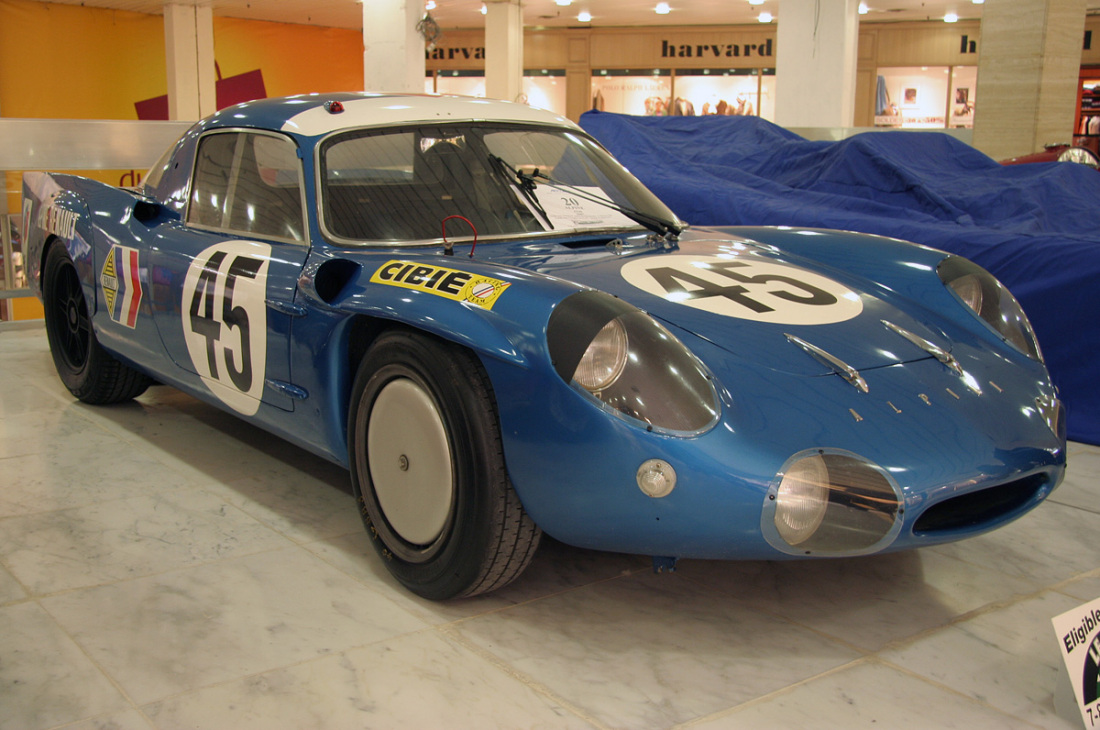
- Category: Group 6 sports prototypes (Le Mans 1967)
- Constructor: Alpine
- Predecessor: Alpine M65
- Successor: Alpine A220

Technical specifications
- Chassis: Steel tubular platform frame chassis, 2-door coupe fiberglass bodywork
- Suspension (front): Double wishbone suspension, coil springs over dampers
- Suspension (rear): Lower wishbones, top links, twin trailing arms, coil springs over dampers
- Engine: Renault mid-mounted
- Transmission: Hewland; Porsche; ZF (V8-powered version); 5 manual
- Weight: 670 kg (1,477 lb)
- Fuel: Elf Aquitaine
- Brakes: Steel discs
- Tires: Michelin A1 (and others)

Competition history
- Notable entrants: Société des Automobiles Alpine
- Debut: 1966 Spa 1000 km
Wins	Poles	F/Laps
1	0	0
- Constructors' Championships: 0
- Drivers' Championships: 0

The Alpine A210 is a sports car prototype manufactured by Alpine that competed in sports car racing from 1966 to 1969. The car is derived from the M series prototypes (M63, M64, and M65) introduced by the company in the early 1960s and powered by Gordini-tuned Renault engines with small displacements. In 1967, a short-lived V8-powered version of the A210, named as A211, was introduced. A major redesign of the A211, the A220, was unveiled the following year. As a consequence of the poor racing results for the two redesigns, Alpine withdrew from sports car racing all of 1970 to 1973, returning for the 1974 European 2 Liter Sports Car Championship with the Alpine A441, finally achieving the overall win at the 1978 24 Hours of Le Mans with the Renault Alpine A442.

== History ==
=== M63, M64, and M65 ===
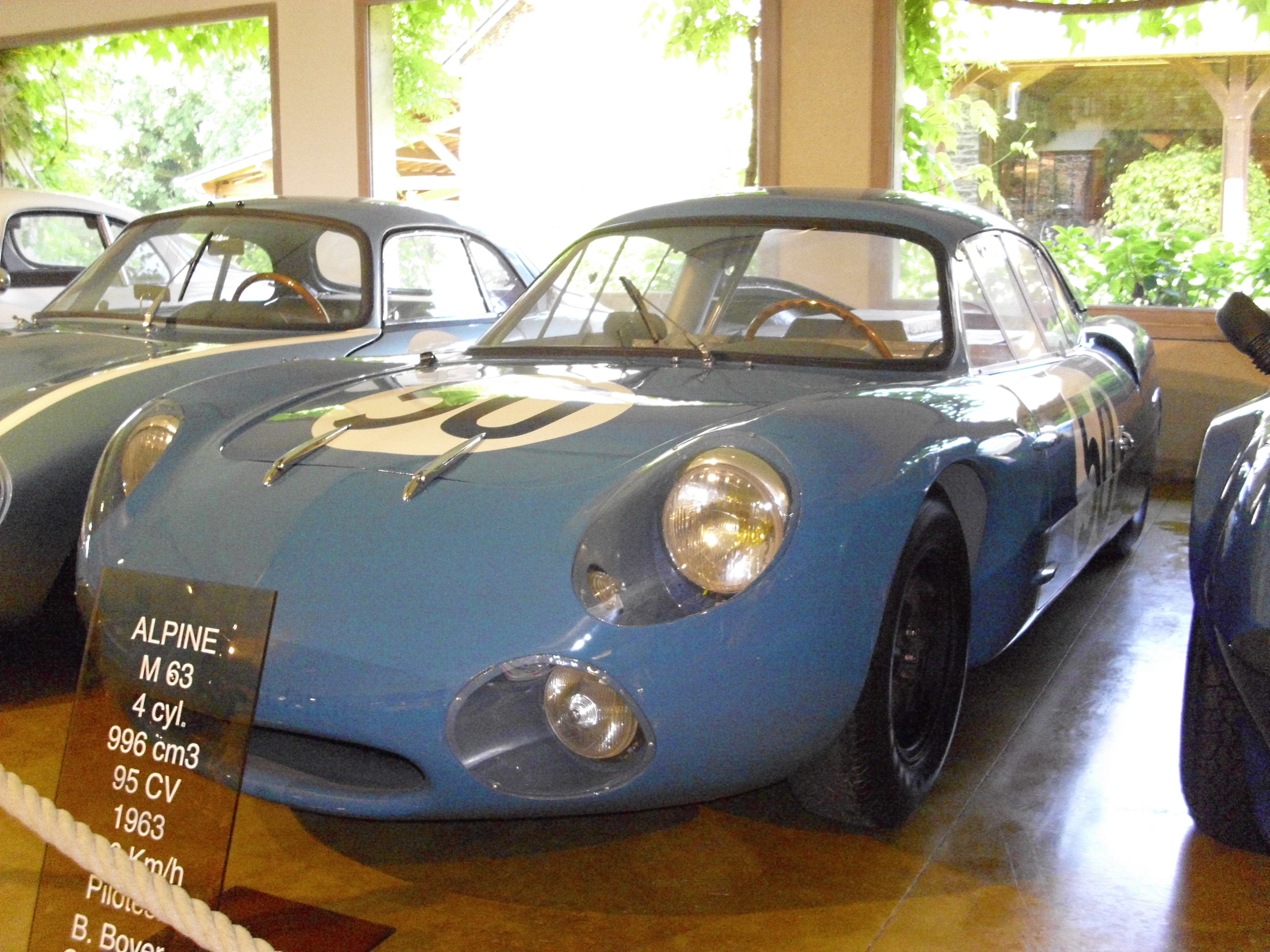
Alpine M63

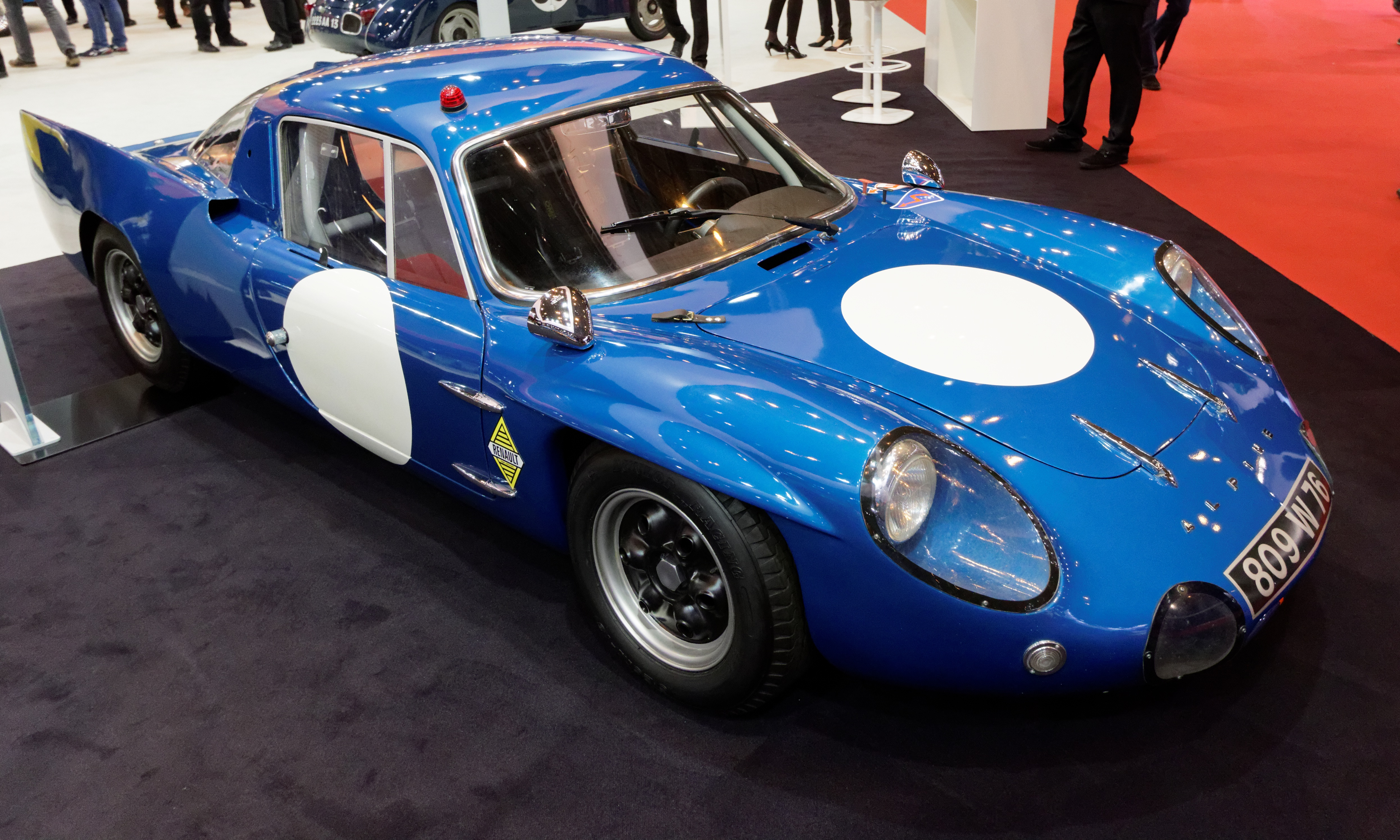
Alpine M65

In 1962, the founder and chief of the Société des Automobiles Alpine, Jean Rédélé, with the support of Shell, requested to Renault Gordini-tuned engines for a sports car programme centred on the 24 Hours of Le Mans, similar to the ones used by BP-sponsored rival Bonnet. Rédélé got a 1-litre inline-four engine and his objective was to build a prototype capable of winning the index of performance award. He contacted Colin Chapman for the design, with the idea of mounting the engine on a Lotus 23-based car, but the latter refused and the basic design development was left in charge of British engineer Len Terry, who created a concept similar to the Lotus. The final chassis design was made by heavy vehicle engineer Richard Bouleau and the external design by Bernard Boyer. The new car was named M63, and, although having some structural problems, it won a class victory in its competition debut at the 1963 edition of the Nürburgring 1000 km. At the 1963 24 Hours of Le Mans, however, none of the three M63s entered finished the race and one of their drivers, Brazilian Christian Heins, died.

After the problems encountered, Alpine built three units of a revised model based on the M63, named as M64. The new cars were entered alongside some of their predecessors into the 1964 24 Hours of Le Mans where an M64 powered by a 1.1-litre engine won its class and the index of performance (chassis 1711). An M64 also won its class at the 12 Hours of Reims of that year (chassis 1711). In 1965, Alpine introduced yet another revised version of its prototypes, named as M65. At the 1965 24 Hours of Le Mans, none of the Alpine prototypes entered finished the race, although M65s won their class at the 12 Hours of Reims and the Nürburgring 1000 km of that year.

=== A210 ===
Following the Le Mans results, Alpine decided to overhaul completely its prototype design and introduced the Alpine A210 (although some lightly modified M65s also participated in some races badged as A210). In the 1966 24 Hours of Le Mans, Alpine made a 1-2-3 in the energy efficiency index, with speeds of up to 270 km/h using a 1.3-litre engine. An A210 driven by Mauro Bianchi won the overall classification of the 1966 Macau Grand Prix for touring cars. Rédéle used the results to convince Renault of giving him support for the construction of a car aimed at the overall victory in Le Mans. Gordini was commissioned to build a new 3-litre V8 to be fitted on the A210 chassis, although it would not be ready for the 1967 edition. Before the race, the A210 was used for the early test of the first radial treadless tire for racing (the Michelin A1). At the 1967 24 Hours of Le Mans, the official Alpine team and the satellite Écurie Savin-Calberson entered with seven A210 (five with the 1.3-litre inline-four engine, one with a 1.5-litre engine and one with a 1-litre engine) and a M64 (with a 1-litre engine). A 1.3-litre and the 1.5-litre A210s won their class, although none get an index win.

==== A211 ====
The V8-powered A210 (named as A211) was unveiled at the 1967 Paris Motor Show and presented to Charles de Gaulle by Jean Rédélé and Renault's president, Pierre Dreyfus. The Gordini engine was compact as requested by Alpine, but proved to be unreliable. Alpine engineers also discovered it was impossible to adequately adapt the engine to the car. They adopted a transitional solution, modifying the A210's rear-end for the engine and adding new wheels, a new 5-speed ZF gearbox and larger rear brakes' cooling inlets. Its debut was at a non-championship race, the Paris 1000 km in the Montlhéry track, where the car problems became evident.

=== A220 ===
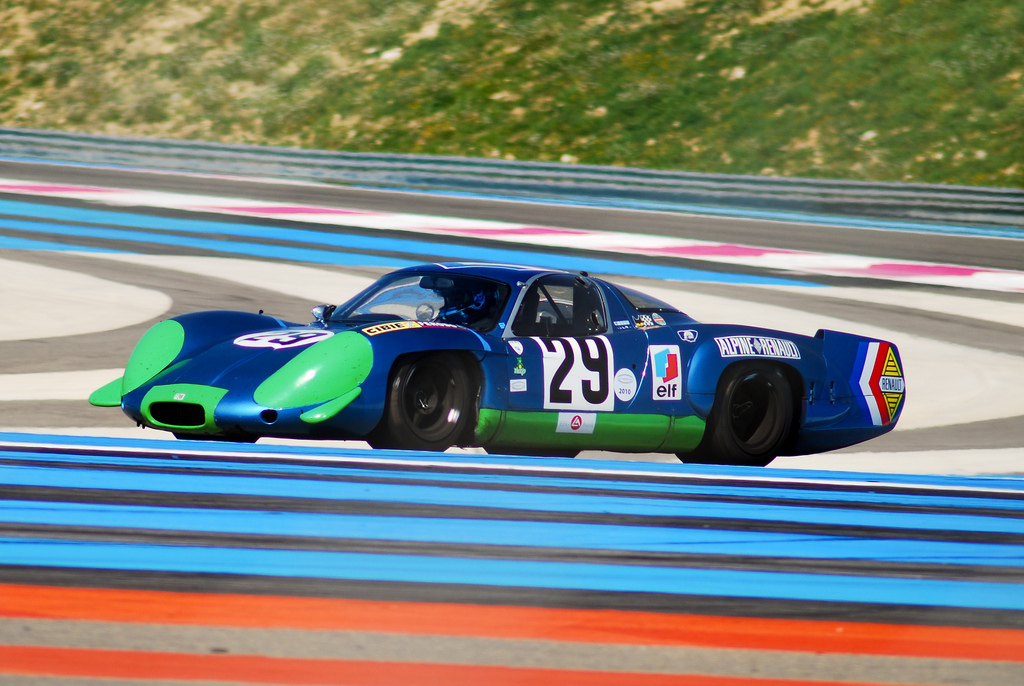
An Alpine A220

For 1968, new regulations banned the four to seven litres engines used by various Alpine rivals such as Chaparral, Ferrari, and Ford which increased Alpine's hopes. The new Alpine contender, the A220, was very different than its predecessor. It was wider, larger, and had bigger wheels. It adopted a right-hand drive layout different from all of its predecessors which were left-hand. This was judged better as most of the turns on circuits are right-handers. At the 1968 24 Hours of Le Mans, only one of the four A220s that entered finished. It was just ahead of three A210s, which again did a 1-2-3 on the performance index. More bad results followed in 1969.

=== Aftermath and legacy ===
With results far below expectations and increased competence, Alpine pulled out of sports car racing in 1970 and focused their resources on rallying. Alpine, in partnership with its then parent company Renault, returning for the 1974 European 2 Liter Sports Car Championship with the Alpine A441, finally achieving a Le Mans overall victory in 1978 with the Renault Alpine A442.

== Bibliography ==
- Smith, Roy (2008). Alpine and Renault: The Development of the Revolutionary Turbo F1 Car 1968 to 1979. Veloce Publishing. ISBN 978-1-8458-4177-5.
- Smith, Roy (2010). Alpine and Renault: The Sports Prototypes 1963 to 1969. Veloce Publishing. ISBN 9781845841911.
