= Günter Klass =

German racing driver

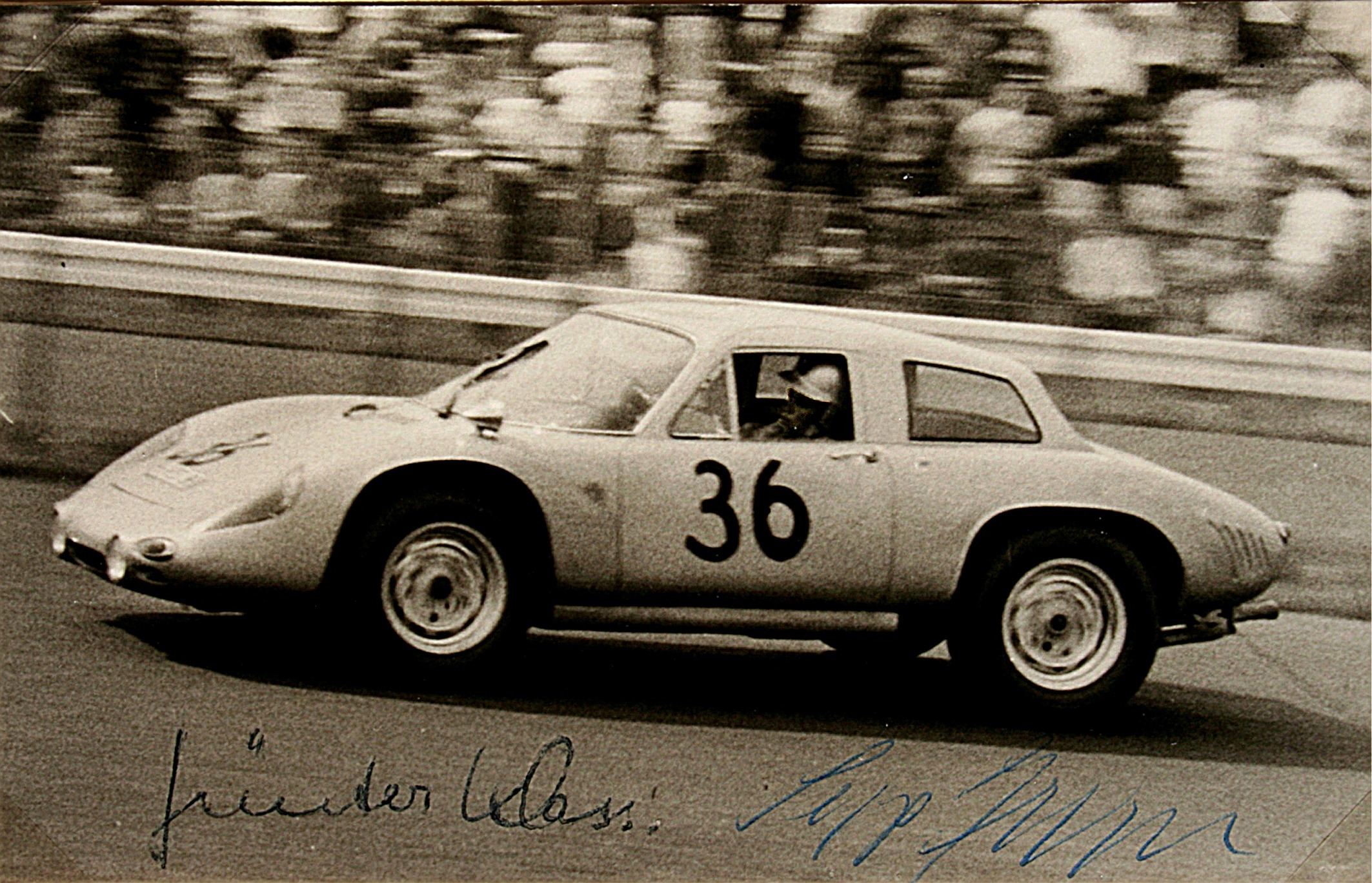
Günter Klass in a Porsche 356 B 1600 GS-GT (Dreikantschaber), 1000 km Nürburgring 1964

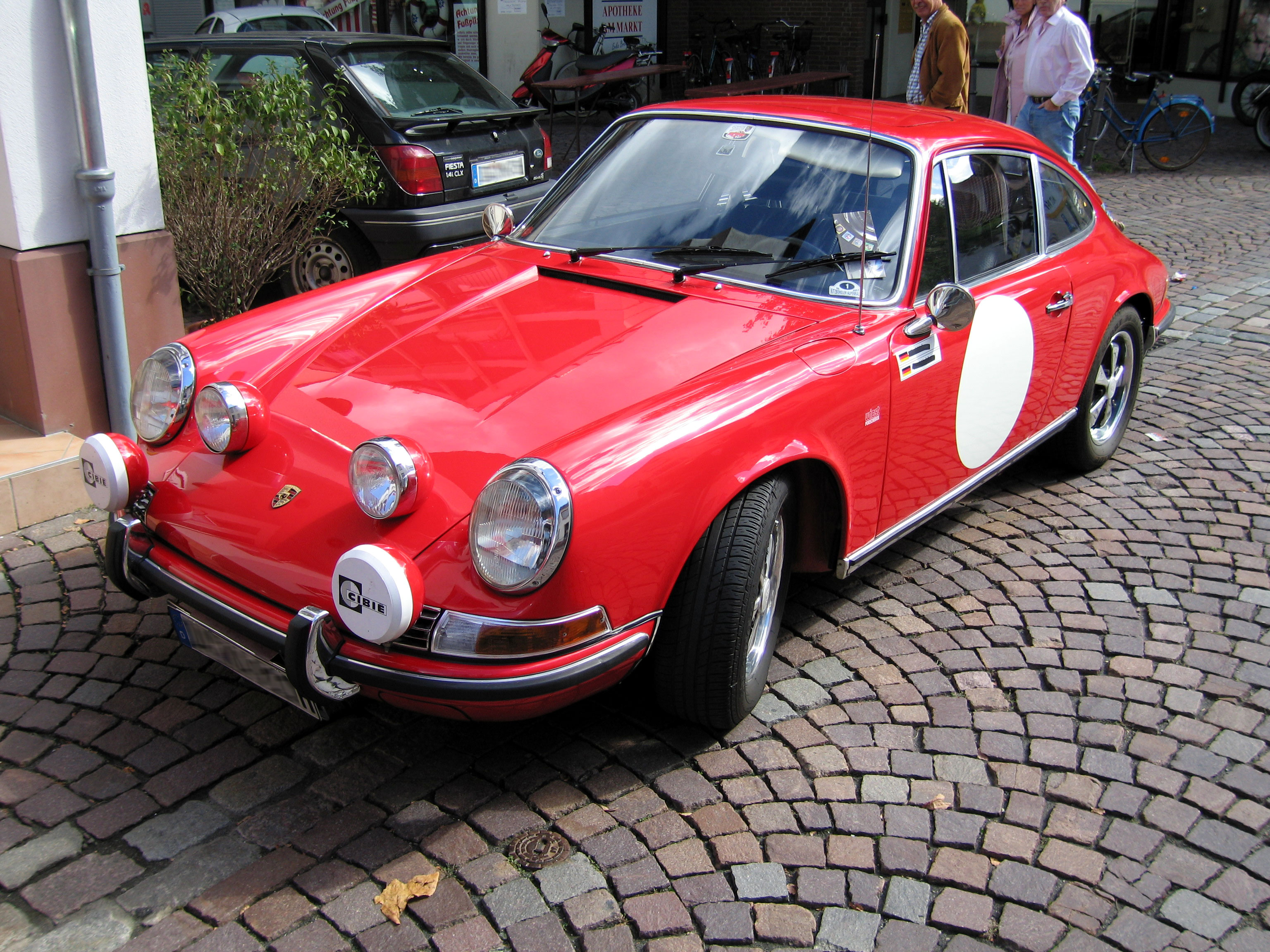
A 1965 Porsche 911 similar to that driven in 1966 by Klass

Günter "Bobby" Klass (13 June 1936 in Stuttgart – 22 July 1967 near Florence) was a versatile German racing driver, competing in hillclimbing, rallying, and the World Sportscar Championship as factory driver for Porsche and the Scuderia Ferrari.

== Career ==
Günter Klass's career began in the early 1960s. In 1963, Klass took part in a World Sportscar Championship event, the 1000 km Nürburgring, in which he and Sepp Greger shared a factory-entered Porsche 356 B Carrera Abarth GTL. In rallying, e.g., at Wiesbaden, he entered driving a private Porsche 356 B Carrera 2, with Rolf Wütherich as co-driver. Wütherich, a Porsche mechanic, had also been co-driver for James Dean, and was serving in that capacity during Dean's fatal car crash. Wütherich was badly injured in the incident.

In 1964, Klass continued to enter road races, sometimes representing the factory and sometimes with private entries. At the time, Porsche's cars had a maximum capacity of 2000 cc and were considered to be underdogs in major events. At the Targa Florio, Klass and Jochen Neerpasch finished seventh, with veteran racer and team manager Fritz Huschke von Hanstein having been entered in the same car, without competing. On the Nürburgring, Klass/Greger finished fifteenth overall and third in their class. In the Tour de France for automobiles, Klass/Wütherich finished fourth after 2200 km in a factory-entered new Porsche 904, while at the 1000 km of Paris at Autodrome de Linas-Montlhéry, he and Robert Buchet did not finish while driving a privately entered car of the same type.

In the 1965 World Sportscar Championship season Klass was entered into races several times by Porsche, which had not yet started the ambitious race program that would lead to the development of the 917. Klass did not finish the race in Le Mans, but ranked fifth both in Sebring and at the Targa Florio, and came in sixth place at Nürburgring. A Porsche 904 of the Swiss team Scuderia Filipinetti carried Klass to a sixth-place finish at the Schauinsland hillclimb in Germany.

In 1966, he became a European rallying champion driving a Porsche 911R. Vic Elford, competing in the Rally Corsica, drove a second 911 given to him by Huschke von Hanstein, Porsche's man in charge of racing. Elford later recalled that the service van provided by Porsche contained only wheels and tires, and no spare parts at all, and that he complained about the lack. Hanstein, however, assured him that, “Porsches, even rally-prepared Porsches, simply don't break.”

The same year, Porsche, under Ferdinand Piëch, started a serious effort toward improving their sports car racing and developed the new Porsche 906. At the Targa Florio, Klass was selected to drive the special hill climb 906 with the 2200 cc, eight-cylinder engine that was derived from the 1962 F1-winning Porsche 804. He duly put the 270 bhp car on pole, his only pole in WSC races, one second ahead of the much more powerful 12-cylinder Ferrari 330P3 driven by Sicily's local heroes, Nino Vaccarella and Lorenzo Bandini.

After battling the Ferrari's drivers while it was “raining the proverbial pushrods”, Klass reclaimed the lead lost by his ill teammate Colin Davis. Soon after, however, he brushed with Porsche teammate Gerhard Mitter who, with a standard 2000 cc six-cylinder version, had set the fastest race lap, and both drivers were out of the race. With three factory Porsches now out due to crashes, the possible 1-2-3 triumph was lost, a disappointment for which Klass seems to have received the lion's share of blame from Zuffenhausen. Klass raced twice more for Porsche, in major races Nürburgring and Le Mans, at the latter of which Klass and Rolf Stommelen won the 2000 cc sports car class. Klass also raced for Porsche at the first Grosser Preis von Hockenheim at the new Hockenheimring. This event only counted in the small classes towards the World Sportscar Championship, and in the absence of major competition, Porsche gave three factory-entered 906Es to the local hero drivers from Stuttgart, Hans Herrmann, Gerhard Mitter, and Klass, with several private 906s, driven by Udo Schütz, Jo Bonnier and others, completing the parade. Klass clocked his only WSC fastest lap in that slipstream battle.

== At Ferrari ==
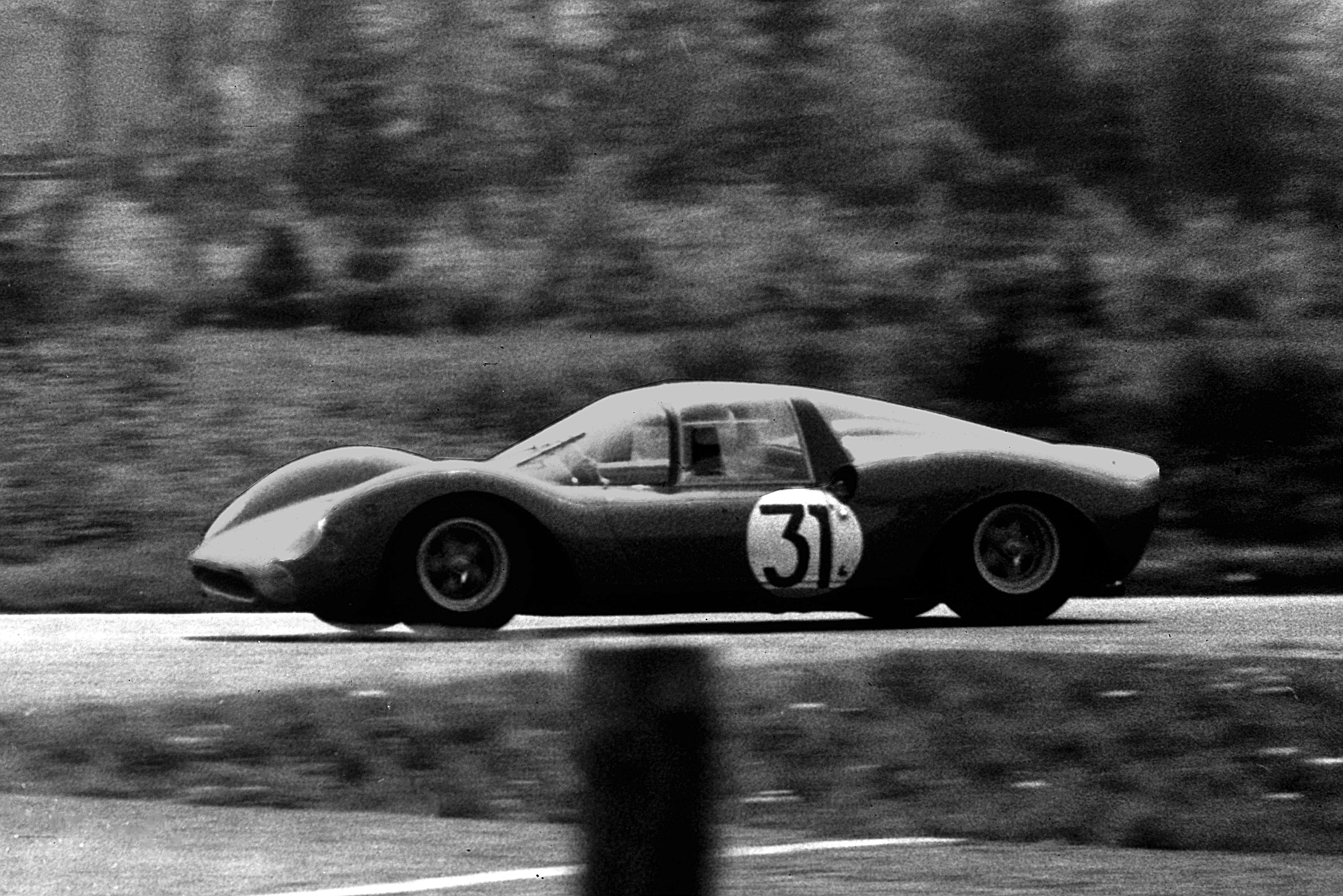
Lorenzo Bandini's Dino 166 P, 1000km Nürburgring 1965

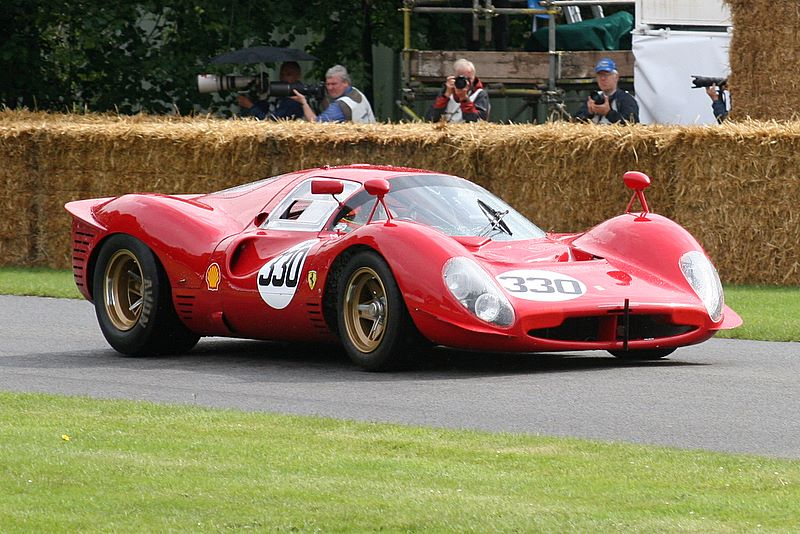
Similar to the factory 330P4, but with a detuned engine: customer Ferrari 412P (chassis 0844) at the 2007 Goodwood Festival of Speed

In 1967, after being a factory driver for Porsche for several years, Klass moved to Ferrari. The season opener at Daytona saw a 1-2-3 triumph of the Italian 12cyl prototypes, which was commemorated by the naming of the Ferrari Daytona. Klass drove a V6 Dino 206 S shared with Herbert Müller, but the car's suspension failed in the banked corners. The Scuderia skipped Sebring, while the factory Fords were absent at the 1000 km Monza, as they focused on the American races and the prestigious 24 Hours at Le Mans. Ferrari won at Monza, although Klass did not get to drive in the race because the Dino engine failed early, while Jonathan Williams was still at the wheel. The 1000 km Spa occurred only a week later on a similar high speed rack, and the Scuderia remained absent.

At the Targa, Porsche challenged Ferrari again on their home soil. In the first 72 kilometres (45 mi) long lap of the Sicilian mountain roads, Mitter's 8-cylinder Porsche 910, Klass in the factory Dino, and the Vaccarella/Scarfiotti 330P4 crashed out. After the private 330P3/4 of Müller and the privately entered Dinos also succumbed or were outpaced, three Porsches took the podium.

By now, it was obvious that Ferrari was finding it difficult to provide competitive and reliable cars both for Formula 1 and sports car racing. They were facing challenges in the big sports car category from the Ford GT40 program, and in the small 2000cc category from Porsche. In addition, Bandini died after being trapped under his 312F1 in Monte Carlo and suffering burns. The Nürburgring event was held only two weeks before Le Mans, and as the bumpy track favored nimble cars anyway, the factory big-bangers of Ford and Ferrari remained absent. The Scuderia equipped Klass' Dino with the 2400cc V6 previously used by Bandini in F1, but that engine did not survive the practice session.

For the all-important Le Mans event, the Scuderia entered four Ferrari 330P4s, backed by two private 330P3/4s. The car driven by Klass and Peter Sutcliffe, (the #19 P4: chassis #0860), ended in the 19th hour, after 296 laps, when the 12-cylinder engine failed. Ford prevailed with a 7-litre Mk. IV ahead of two P4s.

== Death ==
On Saturday 22 July 1967, Klass was killed on the then-66 km-long road course Circuito del Mugello while practicing in the T-car, the hill climb Dino 206 S (Chassis 0842). His car went off the road on the downhill from Giogo Pass to Firenzuola and burst into flames when it crashed into a tree on the right (driver's) side. Klass was trapped behind the steering wheel and suffered fatal chest and internal injuries. Rescuers were able to free him from the burning Ferrari and transported him by helicopter to Careggi Hospital in Florence, where he was pronounced dead upon arrival. Ferrari retired not only the race car (Dino 206 S Chassis 010, #19) Klass would have shared with Jonathan Williams, but also the factory Dino of Ludovico Scarfiotti and Vaccarella.

Sporting positions
| Preceded by Rauno Aaltonen | European Rally Champion G3 Class; 1966 | Succeeded by G1: Sobiesław Zasada; G2: Bengt Söderström; G3: Vic Elford |
