= Pierre Dumay =

French racing driver (1928–2021)

- Born: 21 November 1928
- Died: 22 August 2021 (aged 92); Saint-Tropez
- Occupation: Racing Driver

Pierre Dumay (21 November 1928 – 22 August 2021) was a French racing driver.
