= Superior Essex =

American magnet wire manufacturer

- Type: Subsidiary
- Industry: Electrical cable
- Founded: April 1999 1930 (Essex Wire Corporation); 1954 (Superior Cable)
- Headquarters: Atlanta, United States
- Key people: Daniel Choi (CEO)
- Products: Magnet Wire, Communication Cables
- Revenue: $2.99 billion (2007)
- Number of employees: 3,800
- Parent: LS I&D
- Website: spsx.com

Superior Essex is the parent brand of Essex Solutions, Superior Essex Communications, and Essex Brownell. It has over 3,000 employees in 11 countries. Essex is among the leading global manufacturers of magnet wire. It is active in the electrification of the automotive, energy, and industrial sectors.

== Brands ==
=== Essex Solutions ===
Essex Solutions manufactures magnet wire for the automotive industry and energy, industrial, as well as the commercial and residential sectors.

=== Superior Essex Communications ===
Founded in 1998, is a manufacturer and supplier of communications cable in North America. It is active in the development of power over Ethernet applications, intelligent buildings and smart cities, and 5G Fiber infrastructure as part of the Cisco Digital Ceiling ecosystem. In 2021, Superior Essex Communications announced its appointment as a corporate board member of the Continental Automated Buildings Association (CABA).

=== Essex Brownell ===
Is a distributor of lead wire, motors, drives, electrical and electronic insulation, tapes, repair parts, and shop and test equipment. Essex Brownell operates 16 facilities in the United States, Mexico and Canada.

== History ==
Essex Wire Corporation was founded in 1930 and was an original equipment manufacturer. It operated 44 plants in North America by 1965 and had sales of $355 million.

Superior Cable came into existence in 1954 and had sales passing $500 million in 1997.

In April 1999, Superior Essex was formed by a merger of Essex Wire Corporation and Superior Cable.

In 2008, the Korean LS Group acquired Superior Essex for roughly $900 million to extend its reach into the North American and European market.

Superior Essex's PowerWise cable won a 2018 Top Product of the Year Award for its 4PPoE innovation, and it was also the first cable manufacturer to ever be awarded the International Living Future Institute's Living Product Challenge certification for its Category 6+ low smoke, halogen free (LSHF) cable.
