= Robert Buchet =

French racing driver

- Nationality: French
- Born: May 18, 1922 La Trimouille, France
- Died: December 7, 1974 (aged 52) near Poitiers, France
- Retired: 1969

Sports car racing
- Years active: 1950s–1969
- Teams: Privateer Porsche
- Wins: Multiple national rally wins
- Best finish: 1st in GT <2L class in 1964 24 Hours of Le Mans

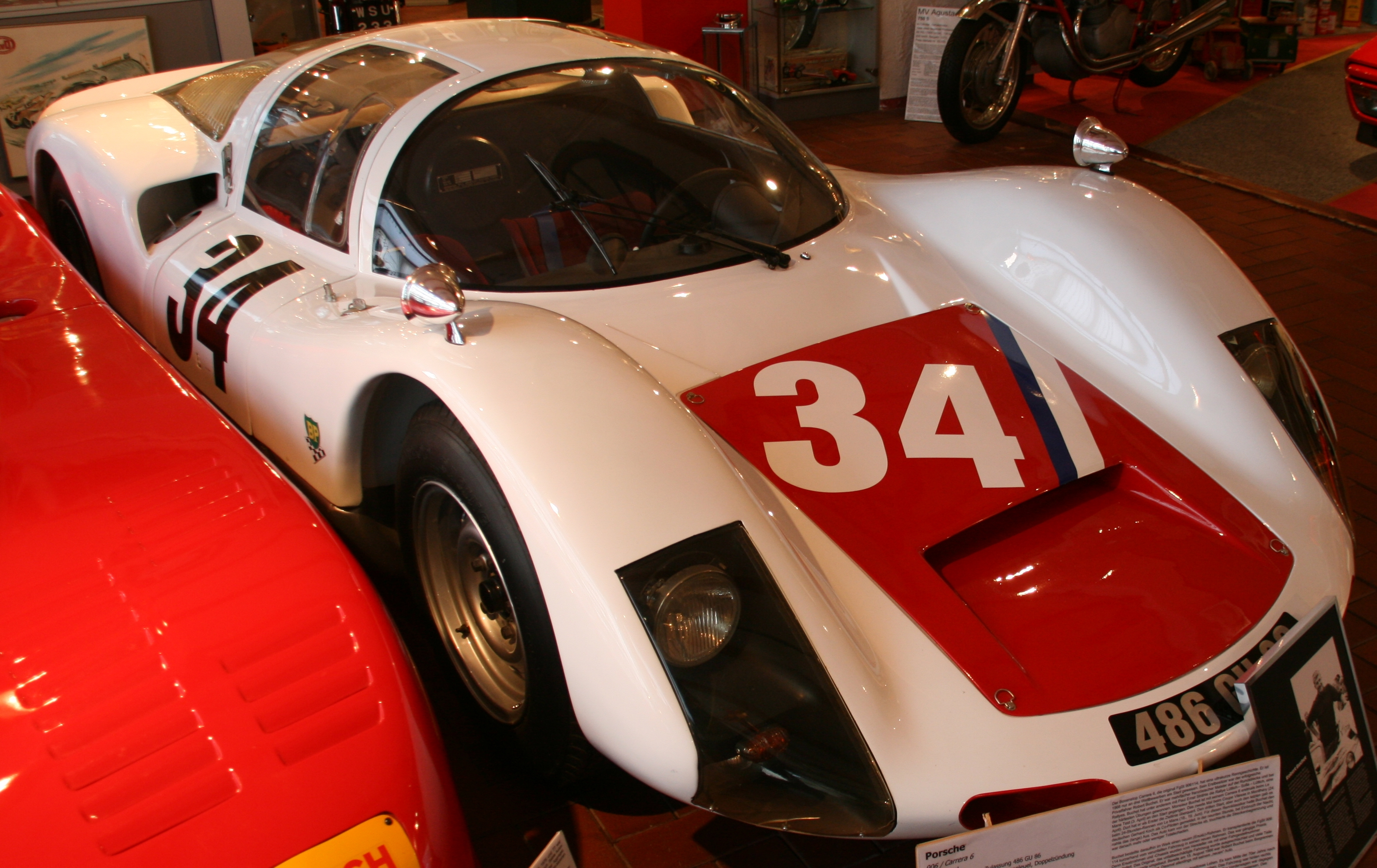
The Porsche 906 that Robert Buchet drove in the 1966 24 Hours of Le Mans

Robert Buchet (known as Bubu; 18 May 1922 – 7 December 1974) was a French racing driver.

== Biography ==
Robert Buchet was born 18 May 1922 in La Trimouille, France.

Buchet achieved his first victories in 1956, winning successively the Rallye des Routes du Nord, the Coupe des Alpes (tied), and the Armagnac Rally, with Claude Storez as co-driver, driving a Porsche 356. In 1957, he and Storez also won the Liège–Rome–Liège Rally. He repeated his success in that event in 1959, this time with Paul Ernst Strähle, driving a Porsche 356B Abarth GTL (with Jacques Féret being the other category winner). His racing record also includes victories in the Bordeaux Rally, the Limousin Rally (1959 and 1961, both in Porsches), the Rallye de l'Ouest, the Cognac Rally, and the La Baule Rally.

From 1961 to 1968, Buchet participated six times in the 24 Hours of Le Mans. In 1964, driving a Porsche 904 with Guy Ligier, he won the GT class under 2 litres at Le Mans. That same year, he finished third in the Tour de France Automobile (GT class) with German driver Herbert Linge. He won the Rallye d'Automne twice in a row, in 1965 and 1966, driving first a Porsche 904 GTS and then a Porsche 911, and also won the Rallye de l'A.C.O. (also known as the Rallye de l'Ouest) in the Grand Touring category in 1965.

In 1967, he became French Circuit Racing Champion, again with Porsche.

A Porsche dealer in Poitiers, Buchet raced various Porsche models throughout his career, including the 356, 904, 906, 907, 910, and 911.

He retired from driving in 1969 after an accident during the Critérium de Touraine. In the early 1970s, he founded the Écurie Robert Buchet, achieving further national and European successes with drivers such as Claude Ballot-Léna and Bob Wollek. Other drivers who raced for Écurie Robert Buchet include Jacques Bienvenue, Vic Elford, Cyril Grandet, and Jacques Hoden.

Robert Buchet died in 1974 at the age of 52, in a road accident that occurred near Poitiers. After his death, his wife ran the Écurie Robert Buchet for several years.

== Major Wins ==
Year	Rally	Co-driver	Car
1956	Rallye des Routes du Nord	Claude Storez	Porsche 356
1957	Liège–Rome–Liège	Claude Storez	Porsche Carrera Speedster
1958	Critérium Neige et Glace	Claude Storez	Porsche Carrera Speedster
1959	Limousin Rally	Bouillaud	Porsche Carrera
1959	Liège–Rome–Liège	Paul Ernst Strähle	Porsche Carrera
1961	Limousin Rally	Villain	Porsche Carrera
1962	Rallye des Routes du Nord	Stanislas Motte	Porsche Carrera
1965	Rallye de l'Ouest	Eduardo Valadas	Porsche 904 GTS
1965	Limousin Rally	Eduardo Valadas	Porsche 904 GTS
1966	Rallye des Routes du Nord (GT)	Jacques Ferrand	Porsche 904 GTS
