= 1966 RAC Tourist Trophy =

The 1966 RAC Tourist Trophy saw the world’s oldest motor race, organised by the Royal Automobile Club, return to Oulton Park on 29 April, for the 31st running of the RAC International Tourist Trophy Race sponsored by Daily Express. The TT, was the second round of the British Sports Car Championship.

== Report ==
=== Entry ===
Despite the race being dropped from the World Sportscar Championship, the event still attracted a total of 30 sports cars, across two classes. However, just 21 took part in qualifying.

=== Qualifying ===
The Formula One (F1) regular, and winner of the previous year’s TT, Denny Hulme took pole position for the Sidney Taylor team, in their Lola-Chevrolet T70 Mk.2, averaging a speed of 102.012 mph (164.172 km/h), around the 2.761 mi (4.443 km) circuit. Dick Protheroe lost his life at the wheel of a Ferrari 330P-64 following an accident during a practice session.

=== Race ===
The race was held over 140 laps of the circuit, split into two heats of 70 laps. Hulme took overall victory, winning with an aggregated time of 4hrs 06:11.200mins., averaging a speed of 94.760 mph (152.501 km/h). Second place went to Tony Dean, in his Brabham-Climax BT8. The podium was completed by Peter Sutcliffe, in his Ford GT40. As Sutcliffe was also the Group 6 class winner, he was awarded The Oulton Trophy. For Hulme, this victory was his second Tourist Trophy, he would go on and win a further two, the last being in 1986.

== Classification ==
=== Aggregate Results ===
Pos.	No.	Group	Driver(s)	Entrant	Car - Engine	Time, Laps	Reason Out
1st	4	Gr. 7	(New Zealand) Denny Hulme	Sidney Taylor	Lola-Chevrolet T70 Mk.2	4hrs 06:11.200; 140 laps	
2nd	14	Gr. 7	(United Kingdom) Tony Dean	Race Proved by Willment	Brabham-Climax BT8	135	
3rd	48	Gr. 6	(United Kingdom) Peter Sutcliffe	Peter Sutcliffe	Ford GT40	134	
4th	58	Gr. 7	(United Kingdom) Geoff Breakell	G.H. Breakell	Brabham-Climax BT8	132	
5th	18	Gr.7	(United Kingdom) Tommy Weber	Vegantune Engineering	Lotus-BRM 23	131	
6th	36	Gr.6	(South Africa) Peter de Klerk	Porsche Cars (GB) Ltd.	Porsche 906	131	
7th	26	Gr. 7	(United Kingdom) John Coundley	John O. Coundley	McLaren Elva M1A Oldsmobile	126	
8th	24	Gr. 7	(United Kingdom) Peter Gethin (United Kingdom) Derek Bennett	Robert Ashcroft Racing Ltd.	Crosslé-BMW 9S	125	
9th	38	Gr. 6	(United Kingdom) David Piper	David Piper	Ferrari 365 P2	123	
10th	56	Gr. 7	(United Kingdom) Peter Sadler	Peter Sadler	Lotus-Ford 30	122	
11th	50	Gr. 6	(United Kingdom) Alan Rees	Maranello Concessionaires Ltd.	Ferrari 250 LM	119	
12th	20	Gr. 7	(United Kingdom) Mike Garton	Vegantune Engineering	Lotus-Ford 23	114	
13th	28	Gr. 7	(United Kingdom) Brian Redman	Red Rose Racing Team	Lola-Chevrolet T70 Mk.2	111	2: Final drive
DNF	54	Gr. 7	(United Kingdom) Malcolm Wayne	Malcolm Wayne	Elva-BRM		DNF
DNF	6	Gr.7	(United Kingdom) Hugh Dibley	Racing Partnership (Jersey) Ltd.	Lola-Chevrolet T70 Mk.2		2: Oil pressure
DNF	30	Gr. 7	(United Kingdom) Keith St. John	Radio London Racing	McLaren Elva-Ford Mk II		DNF
DNF	16	Gr.7	(United Kingdom) Mac Daghorn	Felday Engineering Ltd.	Felday-BRM 4		Mechanical
DNF	8	Gr.7	(Australia) Frank Gardner	Alan Brown	McLaren Elva-Ford Mk I		DNF
DNF	2	Gr.7	(Australia) Jack Brabham	Brabham Racing Organisation Ltd.	Brabham-Repco BT17 Repco		2: Oil Leak
DNF	32	Gr.7	(United Kingdom) David Prophet	David Prophet	McLaren Elva-Chevrolet		DNF
DNF	42	Gr.6	(United Kingdom) Mike Parkes	Maranello Concessionaires Ltd.	Ferrari Dino 206 S		1: Ring & pinion
DNS	44	Gr.6	(United Kingdom) Dick Protheroe	Dick Protheroe	Ferrari 330 P-64		Fatal accident in practice
DNS	46	Gr.6	(United Kingdom) Richard Bond	Nick Cussons	Ford GT40		

- Fastest lap: Denny Hulme, 1:37.400secs. (102.646 mph)
