= RAC Tourist Trophy =

FIA World Endurance Championship
- Venue: Silverstone Circuit
- Location: Silverstone, England
- First race: 1948
- Last race: 2019
- Laps: Various
- Duration: Various
- Most wins (driver): Stirling Moss (7)
- Most wins (manufacturer): BMW (5)

The RAC Tourist Trophy (sometimes called the International Tourist Trophy) was a motor racing award presented by the Royal Automobile Club (RAC) to the overall victor of a motor race in the United Kingdom.

== History ==
Established in 1905, it is the world's oldest automobile race. The race was organised and formulated by senior members of the Automobile Club of Great Britain and Northern Ireland in 1904. They believed there was a major demand for a race to develop and encourage the design and performance of road-going cars.

It was first contested on the Isle of Man in 1905 and continued to be held on the island until 1922. It moved to the Ards Circuit on Northern Ireland's public roads in 1928 after an article written by the journalist Wallace McLeod in a Belfast newspaper suggested it occur in the area and the inventor Harry Ferguson helped the RAC to find a suitable track. Donington Park staged the trophy's following two races in 1937 and 1938 after a major accident involving a Riley car during the 1936 edition killed eight onlookers and injured another 25. Following World War II, it returned to Northern Ireland and was held on the shorter Dundrod Circuit; a second major crash that killed three competitors in 1955 led the local authorities to bar all future car races on the track. Since then, the race has occurred on permanent racing circuits rather than closed public road tracks.

John Napier in an Arrol-Johnston was the event's inaugural winner in 1905. The first non-British driver to win the race was the Frenchman Jean Chassagne, who drove a Sunbeam Tourist Trophy car to victory in the 1922 race. Italian driver Tazio Nuvolari became the first driver in history to claim the trophy in 1933 to accompany it with an overall victory in the 24 Hours of Le Mans in the same year. The winners has been decided by the disqualification of drivers on three occasions, in 2010 to the Nissan pair of Jamie Campbell-Walter and Warren Hughes after the Aston Martin Young Driver AMR pair of Darren Turner and Tomáš Enge lost the victory due to excess wear on their car's plank, in 2016 when Audi's Marcel Fässler, André Lotterer and Benoît Tréluyer were disqualified for a skid block infringement and promoted Porsche's Romain Dumas, Neel Jani and Marc Lieb to first, and in 2018 after two Toyota TS050 Hybrids were disqualified for a failed post-race test and elevated Rebellion Racing drivers Mathias Beche, Thomas Laurent and Gustavo Menezes to the victory. The last winners were Mike Conway, Kamui Kobayashi and José María López for Toyota.

RAC Tourist Trophy, St James Motoring Pageant, Pall Mall, London, 2026

Series to have featured the trophy include the World Sportscar Championship, the FIA GT Cup, the World Touring Car Championship, the European Touring Car Championship, the FIA GT Championship, the British Touring Car Championship, the FIA GT1 World Championship, and the overall winners of the British GT Championship in the 1999, 2000, 2003 and 2004 seasons. (Note: It is unclear whether the RAC considers the Tourist Trophy winners from 1999, 2000, 2003 and 2004 are official because they were not awarded based on a single race.) It has been presented to the overall winners of the Silverstone Circuit round of the FIA World Endurance Championship from 2013 on.

== Trophy ==
The 18-carat gold trophy is based on Giambologna's sculpture of the Greek god Hermes.

== Winners ==
RAC Tourist Trophy winners
Year	Nationality	Drivers	Car	Type	Series	Circuit	Ref(s)
1905	United Kingdom	John Napier	Arrol-Johnston	Touring car	No series	Highlands Course	
1906	United Kingdom	Charles Rolls	Rolls-Royce 20 hp	Touring car	No series	'Short' Highlands Course	
1907	United Kingdom	Ernest Courtis	Rolls-Royce 20 hp	Touring car	No series	'Short' Highlands Course	
1908	United Kingdom	William Watson	Hutton (Napier)	Grand Prix	No series	Four Inch Course	
1909–1913	Not held						
1914	United Kingdom	Kenelm Lee Guinness	Sunbeam	Grand Prix	No series	Isle of Man Mountain Circuit	
1915–1921	Not held due to World War I						
1922	France	Jean Chassagne	Sunbeam Tourist Trophy	Grand Prix	No series	Isle of Man Mountain Circuit	
1923–1927	Not held						
1928	United Kingdom	Kaye Don	Lea-Francis Hyper S	Sports car	No series	Ards Circuit	
1929	Germany	Rudolf Caracciola	Mercedes-Benz SSK	Sports car	No series	Ards Circuit	
1930	Italy	Tazio Nuvolari	Alfa Romeo 6C 1750 GS	Sports car	No series	Ards Circuit	
1931	United Kingdom	Norman Black	MG C-type Midget	Sports car	No series	Ards Circuit	
1932	United Kingdom	Cyril Whitcroft	Riley Brooklands Nine	Sports car	No series	Ards Circuit	
1933	Italy	Tazio Nuvolari	MG Magnette K3	Sports car	No series	Ards Circuit	
1934	United Kingdom	Charles Dodson	MG Magnette NE	Sports car	No series	Ards Circuit	
1935	United Kingdom	Freddie Dixon	Riley TT Sprite	Sports car	No series	Ards Circuit	
1936	United Kingdom	Freddie Dixon	Riley TT Sprite	Sports car	No series	Ards Circuit	
1936	United Kingdom	Charles Dodson	Riley TT Sprite	Sports car	No series	Ards Circuit	
1937	Italy	Franco Comotti	Talbot-Lago T150C	Sports car	No series	Donington Park	
1938	France	Louis Gérard	Delage D6-70	Sports car	No series	Donington Park	
1939–1949	Not held due to World War II						
1950	United Kingdom	Stirling Moss	Jaguar XK120	Sports car	No series	Dundrod Circuit	
1951	United Kingdom	Stirling Moss	Jaguar C-Type	Sports car	No series	Dundrod Circuit	
1952	Planned for 13 September but called off in late August by the Council of the Ulster Automobile Club due to too few entries and the essential international element of the 1951 event largely lacking						
1953	United Kingdom	Peter Collins	Aston Martin DB3S	Sports car	World Sportscar Championship	Dundrod Circuit	
1953	United Kingdom	Pat Griffith	Aston Martin DB3S	Sports car	World Sportscar Championship	Dundrod Circuit	
1954	United Kingdom	Mike Hawthorn	Ferrari 750 Monza	Sports car	World Sportscar Championship	Dundrod Circuit	
1954	France	Maurice Trintignant	Ferrari 750 Monza	Sports car	World Sportscar Championship	Dundrod Circuit	
1955	United States	John Fitch	Mercedes-Benz 300 SLR	Sports car	World Sportscar Championship	Dundrod Circuit	
1955	United Kingdom	Stirling Moss	Mercedes-Benz 300 SLR	Sports car	World Sportscar Championship	Dundrod Circuit	
1956	Not held after the Ulster Motor Club could not reach an agreement with the Royal Automobile Club on the restrictions of entry to the race because the latter believed they would change the event's character						
1957	Not held after the Royal Automobile Club could not find a track to hold the race in Britain "without departing from its original character"						
1958	United Kingdom	Tony Brooks	Aston Martin DBR1/300	Sports car	World Sportscar Championship	Goodwood Circuit	
1958	United Kingdom	Stirling Moss	Aston Martin DBR1/300	Sports car	World Sportscar Championship	Goodwood Circuit	
1959	United Kingdom	Jack Fairman	Aston Martin DBR1/300	Sports car	World Sportscar Championship	Goodwood Circuit	
1959	United Kingdom	Stirling Moss	Aston Martin DBR1/300	Sports car	World Sportscar Championship	Goodwood Circuit	
1959	United States	Carroll Shelby	Aston Martin DBR1/300	Sports car	World Sportscar Championship	Goodwood Circuit	
1960	United Kingdom	Stirling Moss	Ferrari 250 GT	Grand tourer	FIA GT Cup	Goodwood Circuit	
1961	United Kingdom	Stirling Moss	Ferrari 250 GT	Grand tourer	FIA GT Cup	Goodwood Circuit	
1962	United Kingdom	Innes Ireland	Ferrari 250 GTO	Grand tourer	World Sportscar Championship	Goodwood Circuit	
1963	United Kingdom	Graham Hill	Ferrari 250 GTO	Grand tourer	World Sportscar Championship	Goodwood Circuit	
1964	United Kingdom	Graham Hill	Ferrari 330P	Sports car	World Sportscar Championship	Goodwood Circuit	
1965	New Zealand	Denny Hulme	Brabham BT8-Climax	Sports car	British Sports Car Championship	Oulton Park	
1965	New Zealand	Denny Hulme	Brabham BT8-Climax	Sports car	International Championship of Makes	Oulton Park	
1966	New Zealand	Denny Hulme	Lola T70-Chevrolet	Sports car	British Sports Car Championship	Oulton Park	
1967	Italy	Andrea de Adamich	Alfa Romeo GTA	Touring car	European Touring Car Challenge	Oulton Park	
1968	New Zealand	Denny Hulme	Lola T70-Chevrolet	Sports car	British Sports Car Championship	Oulton Park	
1969	United Kingdom	Trevor Taylor	Lola T70-Chevrolet	Sports car	British Sports Car Championship	Oulton Park	
1970	Australia	Brian Muir	Chevrolet Camaro Z28	Touring car	European Touring Car Championship	Silverstone Circuit	
1971	Not held						
1972	West Germany	Dieter Glemser	Ford Capri RS2600	Touring car	European Touring Car Championship	Silverstone Circuit	
1972	West Germany	Jochen Mass	Ford Capri RS2600	Touring car	European Touring Car Championship	Silverstone Circuit	
1973	United Kingdom	Derek Bell	BMW 3.0 CSL	Touring car	European Touring Car Championship	Silverstone Circuit	
1973	Austria	Harald Ertl	BMW 3.0 CSL	Touring car	European Touring Car Championship	Silverstone Circuit	
1974	United Kingdom	Stuart Graham	Chevrolet Camaro Z28	Touring car	European Touring Car Championship	Silverstone Circuit	
1975	United Kingdom	Stuart Graham	Chevrolet Camaro Z28	Touring car	European Touring Car Championship	Silverstone Circuit	
1976	Belgium	Pierre Dieudonné	BMW 3.0 CSL	Touring car	European Touring Car Championship	Silverstone Circuit	
1976	Belgium	Hughes de Fierlandt	BMW 3.0 CSL	Touring car	European Touring Car Championship	Silverstone Circuit	
1976	Belgium	Jean Xhenceval	BMW 3.0 CSL	Touring car	European Touring Car Championship	Silverstone Circuit	
1977	Austria	Dieter Quester	BMW 3.0 CSL	Touring car	European Touring Car Championship	Silverstone Circuit	
1977	United Kingdom	Tom Walkinshaw	BMW 3.0 CSL	Touring car	European Touring Car Championship	Silverstone Circuit	
1978	Belgium	Eddy Joosen	BMW 3.0 CSL	Touring car	European Touring Car Championship	Silverstone Circuit	
1978	Belgium	Raijmond van Hove	BMW 3.0 CSL	Touring car	European Touring Car Championship	Silverstone Circuit	
1979	Italy	Carlo Facetti	BMW 3.0 CSL	Touring car	European Touring Car Championship	Silverstone Circuit	
1979	Italy	Martino Finotto	BMW 3.0 CSL	Touring car	European Touring Car Championship	Silverstone Circuit	
1980	Italy	Umberto Grano	BMW 635CSi	Touring car	European Touring Car Championship	Silverstone Circuit	
1980	Austria	Harald Neger	BMW 635CSi	Touring car	European Touring Car Championship	Silverstone Circuit	
1980	Austria	Heribert Werginz	BMW 635CSi	Touring car	European Touring Car Championship	Silverstone Circuit	
1981	United Kingdom	Chuck Nicholson	Mazda RX-7	Touring car	European Touring Car Championship	Silverstone Circuit	
1981	United Kingdom	Tom Walkinshaw	Mazda RX-7	Touring car	European Touring Car Championship	Silverstone Circuit	
1982	United Kingdom	Chuck Nicholson	Jaguar XJS	Touring car	European Touring Car Championship	Silverstone Circuit	
1982	United Kingdom	Tom Walkinshaw	Jaguar XJS	Touring car	European Touring Car Championship	Silverstone Circuit	
1983	France	René Metge	Rover Vitesse	Touring car	European Touring Car Championship	Silverstone Circuit	
1983	United Kingdom	Steve Soper	Rover Vitesse	Touring car	European Touring Car Championship	Silverstone Circuit	
1984	Italy	Gianfranco Brancatelli	BMW 635CSi	Touring car	European Touring Car Championship	Silverstone Circuit	
1984	West Germany	Helmut Kelleners	BMW 635CSi	Touring car	European Touring Car Championship	Silverstone Circuit	
1985	United Kingdom	Win Percy	Rover Vitesse	Touring car	European Touring Car Championship	Silverstone Circuit	
1985	United Kingdom	Tom Walkinshaw	Rover Vitesse	Touring car	European Touring Car Championship	Silverstone Circuit	
1986	United Kingdom	Jeff Allam	Rover Vitesse	Touring car	European Touring Car Championship	Silverstone Circuit	
1986	New Zealand	Denny Hulme	Rover Vitesse	Touring car	European Touring Car Championship	Silverstone Circuit	
1987	Switzerland	Enzo Calderari	BMW M3	Touring car	World Touring Car Championship	Silverstone Circuit	
1987	Italy	Fabio Mancini	BMW M3	Touring car	World Touring Car Championship	Silverstone Circuit	
1988	France	Alain Ferté	Ford Sierra RS500	Touring car	European Touring Car Championship	Silverstone Circuit	
1988	United Kingdom	Andy Rouse	Ford Sierra RS500	Touring car	European Touring Car Championship	Silverstone Circuit	
1989–1993	Not held						
1994	New Zealand	Paul Radisich	Ford Mondeo Ghia	Touring car	FIA Touring Car World Cup	Donington Park	
1995	Not held						
1996	Switzerland	Alain Menu	Renault Laguna	Touring car	No series	Donington Park	
1997	Switzerland	Alain Menu	Renault Laguna	Touring car	No series	Donington Park	
1998	France	Emmanuel Collard	Ferrari 333 SP	Sports car	International Sports Racing Series	Donington Park	
1998	Italy	Vincenzo Sospiri	Ferrari 333 SP	Sports car	International Sports Racing Series	Donington Park	
1999	United Kingdom	Julian Bailey	Lister Storm GTL	Sports car	British GT Championship	N/A	
1999	United Kingdom	Jamie Campbell-Walter	Lister Storm GTL	Sports car	British GT Championship	N/A	
2000	United Kingdom	Calum Lockie	Marcos LM600	Sports car	British GT Championship	N/A	
2001–2002	Not held						
2003	United Kingdom	Tom Herridge	Mosler MT900R	Sports car	British GT Championship	N/A	
2004	United Kingdom	Jonny Cocker	Porsche 911 GT3-RSR	Sports car	British GT Championship	N/A	
2005	Netherlands	Peter Kox	Aston Martin DBR9	Grand tourer	FIA GT Championship	Silverstone Circuit	
2005	Portugal	Pedro Lamy	Aston Martin DBR9	Grand tourer	FIA GT Championship	Silverstone Circuit	
2006	Germany	Michael Bartels	Maserati MC12	Grand tourer	FIA GT Championship	Silverstone Circuit	
2006	Italy	Andrea Bertolini	Maserati MC12	Grand tourer	FIA GT Championship	Silverstone Circuit	
2007	Italy	Thomas Biagi	Maserati MC12	Grand tourer	FIA GT Championship	Silverstone Circuit	
2007	Finland	Mika Salo	Maserati MC12	Grand tourer	FIA GT Championship	Silverstone Circuit	
2008	Austria	Karl Wendlinger	Aston Martin DBR9	Grand tourer	FIA GT Championship	Silverstone Circuit	
2008	United Kingdom	Ryan Sharp	Aston Martin DBR9	Grand tourer	FIA GT Championship	Silverstone Circuit	
2009	Austria	Karl Wendlinger	Saleen S7-R	Grand tourer	FIA GT Championship	Silverstone Circuit	
2009	United Kingdom	Ryan Sharp	Saleen S7-R	Grand tourer	FIA GT Championship	Silverstone Circuit	
2010 (Note: The Aston Martin Young Driver AMR duo of Tomáš Enge and Darren Turner were the provisional winners of the 2010 RAC Tourist Trophy before the team's DBR9 was disqualified for excessive wear on its underbody plank. The team lost a later appeal with the FIA International Court of Appeal.)	United Kingdom	Jamie Campbell-Walter	Nissan GT-R GT1	Grand tourer	FIA GT1 World Championship	Silverstone Circuit	
2010	United Kingdom	Warren Hughes	Nissan GT-R GT1	Grand tourer	FIA GT1 World Championship	Silverstone Circuit	
2011	Germany	Michael Krumm	Nissan GT-R GT1	Grand tourer	FIA GT1 World Championship	Silverstone Circuit	
2011	Germany	Lucas Luhr	Nissan GT-R GT1	Grand tourer	FIA GT1 World Championship	Silverstone Circuit	
2012	Not held						
2013	France	Loïc Duval	Audi R18 e-tron quattro	Sports car	FIA World Endurance Championship	Silverstone Circuit	
2013	Denmark	Tom Kristensen	Audi R18 e-tron quattro	Sports car	FIA World Endurance Championship	Silverstone Circuit	
2013	United Kingdom	Allan McNish	Audi R18 e-tron quattro	Sports car	FIA World Endurance Championship	Silverstone Circuit	
2014	Switzerland	Sébastien Buemi	Toyota TS040 Hybrid	Sports car	FIA World Endurance Championship	Silverstone Circuit	
2014	United Kingdom	Anthony Davidson	Toyota TS040 Hybrid	Sports car	FIA World Endurance Championship	Silverstone Circuit	
2014	France	Nicolas Lapierre	Toyota TS040 Hybrid	Sports car	FIA World Endurance Championship	Silverstone Circuit	
2015	Switzerland	Marcel Fässler	Audi R18 e-tron quattro	Sports car	FIA World Endurance Championship	Silverstone Circuit	
2015	Germany	André Lotterer	Audi R18 e-tron quattro	Sports car	FIA World Endurance Championship	Silverstone Circuit	
2015	France	Benoît Tréluyer	Audi R18 e-tron quattro	Sports car	FIA World Endurance Championship	Silverstone Circuit	
2016 (Note: The Audi trio of Marcel Fassler, André Lotterer and Benoît Tréluyer were disqualified from the race victory because of excess wear on their Audi R18's skid block caused by a significant vertical movement on the vehicle. An appeal by Audi was withdrawn five days after the race.)	France	Romain Dumas	Porsche 919 Hybrid	Sports car	FIA World Endurance Championship	Silverstone Circuit	
2016	Switzerland	Neel Jani	Porsche 919 Hybrid	Sports car	FIA World Endurance Championship	Silverstone Circuit	
2016	Germany	Marc Lieb	Porsche 919 Hybrid	Sports car	FIA World Endurance Championship	Silverstone Circuit	
2017	Switzerland	Sébastien Buemi	Toyota TS050 Hybrid	Sports car	FIA World Endurance Championship	Silverstone Circuit	
2017	United Kingdom	Anthony Davidson	Toyota TS050 Hybrid	Sports car	FIA World Endurance Championship	Silverstone Circuit	
2017	Japan	Kazuki Nakajima	Toyota TS050 Hybrid	Sports car	FIA World Endurance Championship	Silverstone Circuit	
2018 (Note: Two Toyota TS050 Hybrids that finished in first and second positions were disqualified for failing frontal skid block deflection examinations underneath the cars. Toyota elected not to appeal the decision.)	Switzerland	Mathias Beche	Rebellion R13	Sports car	FIA World Endurance Championship	Silverstone Circuit	
2018	France	Thomas Laurent	Rebellion R13	Sports car	FIA World Endurance Championship	Silverstone Circuit	
2018	United States	Gustavo Menezes	Rebellion R13	Sports car	FIA World Endurance Championship	Silverstone Circuit	
2019	United Kingdom	Mike Conway	Toyota TS050 Hybrid	Sports car	FIA World Endurance Championship	Silverstone Circuit	
2019	Japan	Kamui Kobayashi	Toyota TS050 Hybrid	Sports car	FIA World Endurance Championship	Silverstone Circuit	
2019	Argentina	José María López	Toyota TS050 Hybrid	Sports car	FIA World Endurance Championship	Silverstone Circuit	

== Statistics ==
Multiple winners
Name	Wins
Stirling Moss	7
Denny Hulme	4
Tom Walkinshaw	4
Sébastien Buemi	2
Anthony Davidson	2
Freddie Dixon	2
Charles Dodson	2
Stuart Graham	2
Graham Hill	2
Chuck Nicholson	2
Tazio Nuvolari	2
Ryan Sharp	2
Karl Wendlinger	2

Multiple winners by vehicle
Car	Wins
BMW 3.0 CSL	5
Chevrolet Camaro Z28	3
Lola T70-Chevrolet	3
Rover Vitesse	3
Aston Martin DBR1/300	2
Aston Martin DBR9	2
Audi R18 e-tron quattro	2
Ferrari 250 GT	2
Ferrari 250 GTO	2
Maserati MC12	2
Nissan GT-R GT1	2
Renault Laguna	2
Riley TT Sprite	2
Toyota TS050 Hybrid	2

Winners by nationality
Nationality	Winners	Drivers
British	49	37
Italian	12	10
French	11	11
German	9	9
Swiss	8	6
Austrian	6	5
Belgian	5	5
New Zealander	5	2
American	3	3
Japanese	2	2
Argentine	1	1
Australia	1	1
Danish	1	1
Dutch	1	1
Finnish	1	1
Portuguese	1	1
