= 1965 RAC Tourist Trophy =

1965 saw the revival of the world’s oldest motor race when the Royal Automobile Club brought the 30th RAC International Tourist Trophy Race with the Senior Service Trophy to Oulton Park. The TT, was the fourth round of the International Championship for Manufacturers (Division III). In addition, it was also round three of the British Sports Car Championship. This was the held at the Oulton Park circuit, in Cheshire, England, on 1 May.

== Report ==
=== Entry ===
A total of 30 sports cars were entered for the event, across two classes, however just 25 took part in qualifying.

=== Qualifying ===
The reigning World Drivers Champion, John Surtees took pole position for this own outfit, Team Surtees, in his Lola-Chevrolet T70, averaging a speed of 103.495 mph, around 2.761 miles circuit.

=== Race ===
The final was held over four hour duration of the Oulton Park circuit, split into two heats of two hours. Denny Hulme took impressive overall victory, after winning the first heat in his Sidney Taylor Racing prepared Brabham-Climax BT8, and subsequently taking a second place in the second heat. Hulme won in an aggregated time of 4hrs 03:01.400mins., averaging a speed of 94.618 mph. Second place went to David Hobbs, in his Lola-Ford T70. The podium was completed by David Piper, in his Ferrari 250 LM. Hulme victory was his first win in the TT, he would go on and win a total of four, the last being in 1986.

== Classification ==
=== Aggregate Results ===
Pos.	No.	Group	Driver(s)	Entrant	Car - Engine	Time, Laps	Reason Out
1st	16	SR/P+1.6	(New Zealand) Denny Hulme	Sidney Taylor Racing	Brabham-Climax BT8	4hrs 03:01.400, 138	
2nd	2	SR/P+1.6	(United Kingdom) David Hobbs	Harold Young Ltd.	Lola-Ford T70	137	
3rd	14	SR/P+1.6	(United Kingdom) David Piper	David Piper (Auto Racing) Ltd.	Ferrari 250 LM	133	
4th	21	GT+2.0	(United Kingdom) John Whitmore	Alan Mann Racing	Shelby Cobra roadster	130	
5th	28	GT+2.0	(United Kingdom) Peter Sutcliffe	Peter Sutcliffe	Ferrari 250 GTO	130	
6th	25	GT+2.0	(United States) Allen Grant	Radford Racing	Shelby Cobra roadster	128	
7th	22	GT+2.0	(United Kingdom) Jack Sears	Alan Mann Racing	Shelby Daytona Cobra Coupe	127	
8th	26	GT+2.0	(United Kingdom) Neil Dangerfield (United Kingdom) John Sparrow	Radford Racing	Shelby Cobra roadster	126	
9th	6	SR/P+1.6	(United Kingdom) David Prophet	David Prophet (Racing) Ltd.	Lotus-Ford 30	122	
10th	23	GT+2.0	(Australia) Frank Gardner	Willment Racing Team	Shelby Cobra Willment Coupe	119	
11th	30	GT+2.0	(United Kingdom) David Wansbrough	D. Protheroe Ltd.	Jaguar E-Type Lightweight	117	2: DNF
12th	27	GT+2.0	(United Kingdom) Mike Salmon	John Dawnay Racing	Ferrari 250 GTO/64	114	1: Brakes
13th	31	GT+2.0	(United Kingdom) Richard Bond	Red Rose Racing	Jaguar E-Type Lightweight	107	
14th	4	SR/P+1.6	(United Kingdom) Jim Clark	Team Lotus	Lotus-Ford 30	102	2: Transmission
15th	11	SR/P+1.6	(United Kingdom) John Coundley	John Coundley Racing Partnership	McLaren Elva M1A Oldsmobile	101	
DNF	8	SR/P+1.6	(United Kingdom) Chris Williams	C. M. M. Williams	Lotus-BMW 23	81	1: Gearbox; 2: Head gasket
DNF	17	SR/P+1.6	(United States) Tommy Hitchcock	Celebrity Incorporated	Brabham-Climax BT8	72	2: Valves
DNF	7	SR/P+1.6	(United Kingdom) Vic Wilson	Team Chamaco-Collect	Lotus-Ford 30	68	2: Clutch
DNF	10	SR/P+1.6	(New Zealand) Chris Amon	Bruce McLaren Motor Racing Ltd.	Elva-BMW Mk. VIII	60	1: Overheating; 2: Valves
DNF	9	SR/P+1.6	(New Zealand) Bruce McLaren	Bruce McLaren Motor Racing Ltd.	McLaren Elva-Oldsmobile M1A	30	1&2: Oil Leak
DNF	24	GT+2.0	(United Kingdom) Roger Mac	The Chequered Flag Ltd.	Shelby Cobra roadster	29	1: Broken wheel
DNF	19	SR/P+1.6	(United Kingdom) Tony Lanfranchi	Weybridge Engineering Co. Ltd.	Attila-Ford Mk.3	19	1: Drive shaft
DNF	1	SR/P+1.6	(United Kingdom) John Surtees	Lola Cars/Team Surtees Ltd.	Lola-Chevrolet T70	13	1: Steering
DNF	3	SR/P+1.6	(United Kingdom) Hugh Dibley	H. P. K. Dibley	Lola-Chevrolet T70	13	1: Suspension
DNS	15	SR/P+1.6	(United Kingdom) Roger Nathan	Roger Nathan (Racing)	Brabham-Oldsmobile BT8		Clutch

- Fastest lap: Bruce McLaren, 1:39.000secs. (100.400 mph)

=== Heat 1 ===
Pos.	Driver	Laps	Reason Out
1st	Hulme	69	
2nd	Hobbs	67	
3rd	Coundley	67	
4th	Piper	67	
5th	Hitchcock	66	
6th	Sutcliffe	65	
7th	Gardner	65	
8th	Whitmore	65	
9th	Grant	64	
10th	Bond	63	
11th	Dangerfield / Sparrow	63	
12th	Prophet	62	
13th	Wansbrough	62	
14th	Wilson	62	
15th	Sears	61	
16th	Clark	61	
DNF	Amon		Overheating
DNF	Williams		Gearbox
DNF	Salmon	48	Brakes
DNF	Mac	29	Lost wheel
DNF	Lanfranchi	19	Drive shaft
DNF	Mclaren	14	Gearbox
DNF	Surtees	13	Steering
DNF	Dibley	12	Suspension
DNS	Nathan		Engine

=== Heat 2 ===
Pos.	Driver	Time, Laps	Reason Out
1st	Hobbs	70	
2nd	Hulme	69	
3rd	Sears	66	
4th	Salmon	66	
5th	Piper	66	
6th	Whitmore	65	
7th	Peter Sutcliffe	65	
8th	Grant	64	
9th	Dangerfield / Sparrow	63	
10th	Prophet	60	
11th	Gardner	54	
12th	Bond	44	
13th	Coundley	33	
DNF	Williams		Head gasket
DNF	Amon		Valves
DNF	Wansbrough	55	DNF
DNF	Clark	41	Transmission
DNF	McLaren	16	Engine
DNF	Hitchcock	6	Transmission
DNF	Vic Wilson	6	Clutch
DNS	Surtees		
DNS	Dibley		
DNS	Nathan		
DNS	Lanfranchi		
DNS	Mac		
