= 1968 RAC Tourist Trophy =

The 1968 RAC Tourist Trophy was a motor race which was held at the Oulton Park circuit, in Cheshire, England, on the 3 June. Although the 1967 race was part of the European Touring Car Championship, the 1968 and 33rd running of the RAC International Tourist Trophy Race saw a return to Group 7 sportscars. The world's oldest motor race was the fourth round of the 1968 British Sports Car Championship.

== Report ==
=== Entry ===
The event attracted a total of 33 sports cars, with every entrant taking part in qualifying. Amongst the entries was the reigning World Drivers Champion, Denny Hulme.

=== Qualifying ===
Fresh from his second place in the 1968 Monaco Grand Prix, Richard Attwood took pole position for the Alan Mann Racing team, in their Ford P68, averaging a speed of 103.500 mph, around 2.761 miles circuit. Alongside Attwood would be Jo Bonnier, in his self-entered Lola T70.

=== Race ===
The race was held over 110 laps of the Oulton Park circuit. Denny Hulme took his Sid Taylor Racing prepared Lola T70 Mk.3 to his third TT win in four years, winning with an aggregated time of 3hrs 03:57.200mins., averaging a speed of 99.074 mph. Just 9.4 seconds behind in second place was David Piper, who shared his Ferrari 412 P with Richard Attwood. Attwood joined Piper following the demise of his pole winning Ford P68. Third place was attained by Paul Hawkins, in his Ford GT40, albeit one lap adrift.

== Classification ==
=== Result ===
Pos.	No.	Driver(s)	Entrant	Car - Engine	Time, Laps	Reason Out
1st	42	(New Zealand) Denny Hulme	Sid Taylor Racing	Lola-Chevrolet T70 Mk.3 GT	3hrs 03:57.200; 110 laps	
2nd	34	(United Kingdom) David Piper (United Kingdom) Richard Attwood	David Piper	Ferrari 412 P	3hrs 04:06.600; 110	
3rd	38	(Australia) Paul Hawkins	Paul Hawkins Racing	Ford GT40	109	
4th	14	(United Kingdom) Tony Dean	A. G. Dean (Racing)	Ferrari Dino 206 S	104	
5th	18	(United Kingdom) William Bradley	Midland Racing Partnership	Porsche 906	103	
6th	16	(United Kingdom) Jeff Edmonds	Jeff Edmonds	Porsche 906	103	
7th	19	(United Kingdom) Jeremy Delmar-Morgan	Jeremy Delmar-Morgan	Porsche 906	102	
8th	37	(United Kingdom) Peter Sadler	Peter Sadler	Ford GT40	102	
9th	36	(United Kingdom) David Prophet (United Kingdom) Richard Bond	David Prophet	Ford GT40	101	
10th	7	(United Kingdom) John Miles	Gold Leaf Team Lotus	Lotus 47	100	
11th		(United Kingdom) John Bridges (United Kingdom) John Lepp	John Bridges	Chevron-Ford B6	96	Clutch
12th		(United Kingdom) Alain de Cadenet (United Kingdom) Alan McKay	Alain de Cadenet	Ferrari Dino 206 S	94	
13th		(United Kingdom) John Moore	Richard Groves	Ginetta-Lotus G12	92	
14th	3	(United Kingdom) John Nicholson	John Nicholson	Lotus 47	81	
DNF	1	(United Kingdom) Trevor Taylor	Team Elite	Lotus 47	63	Front Suspension
DNF		(United Kingdom) John Markey	Racing Preparations	Chevron-Climax B8	62	
DNF		(United Kingdom) Mike Beckwith	A. G. Dean (Racing)	Porsche 906	59	Chassis breakage
DNF		(United Kingdom) John Calvert (United Kingdom) Jim Lumsden-Taylor	John Calvert	Lotus 47	56	
DNF		(United Kingdom) John Blades	Northumbria Racing Association	Chevron-BMW B8	37	Fuel pump
DNF	22	(United Kingdom) John Lepp	John Lepp	Chevron-BMW B8	35	Valve springs
DNF		(United Kingdom) Phil Silverston	Phil Silverston	Chevron-BMW B8	29	Accident
DNF		(United Kingdom) John Hine	Chris Barber	Lotus 47	28	Con rod
DNF	23	(United Kingdom) Alan Rollinson	Techspeed Racing	Chevron-BMW B8	20	Throttle linkage
DNF	40	(Sweden) Jo Bonnier	Ecurie Bonnier	Lola-Chevrolet T70 Mk.3 GT	17	Split fuel tank
DNF		(United Kingdom) Roger Nathan	Roger Nathan Motor Racing	Nathan-BMW	16	Head gasket
DNF		(United Kingdom) Chris Ashmore	Jeff Edmonds	Ferrari 250 LM	12	Brakes
DNF	39	(United Kingdom) Eric Liddell	Paul Hawkins Racing	Ford GT40	12	Gearbox
DNF		(United Kingdom) Richard Attwood	Alan Mann Racing	Ford P68	11	Differential
DNF		(United Kingdom) Geoff Breakell	Tom Clapham	Chevron-Ford B8	4	Cracked block
DNS		(United Kingdom) John Burton	Worcestershire Racing Association	Ginetta-Ford G16		Unraceworthy
DNS	21	(United Kingdom) Trevor Twaites		Chevron-BMW B8		
DNS		(United Kingdom) Edward Nelson	Edward Nelson	Ford GT40		Cracked block
DNS		(United Kingdom) David Skailes	David Skailes	Ferrari 250 LM		Valve-seat
