= British Sports Car Championship =

- Category: Sportscar
- Country: United Kingdom
- Inaugural season: 1964
- Folded: 1976

The British Sports Car Championship, was a British domestic motor racing championship which was originally created for sports cars complying with Appendix C of the International Sporting Code. For 1966 the championship was for Group 7 Sports Racing Cars and for 1967 it was restricted to Group 4 Sports Cars. By 1970, the 2-litre sports category had become very popular across Europe, therefore the organisers decided to change the championship regulations, admitting only these cars. The championship was abandoned during the 1972 season, after one race, because of a lack of entries. An attempt to re-launch the championship lead to a one-off single season being run in 1976.

The series began in 1964 with the Lavant Cup at Goodwood being won by John Coundley, however by the end of the inaugural season, established Formula One drivers were taking part, with the reigning World Drivers Champion, Jim Clark and Bruce McLaren among the race winners.

== Championship winners ==
Year	Champion driver	Car
1964		
1965	David Hobbs	Lola T70-Ford
1966	Denny Hulme	Lola T70 Mk 2-Chevrolet
1967	David Piper	Ford GT40
1968	Bill Bradley	Porsche Carrera 6
1969	John Lepp	Chevron B8
1970	Trevor Twaites	Chevron B8
1971	Karl von Wendt	Lola T212
1972	Guy Edwards	Lola T290
1973 - 1975	Not contested	
1976	Iain McLaren	Chevron B26
