= 1966 Rothmans 12 Hour International Sports Car Race =

Coordinates: 28°0′59″S 153°22′34″E

The 1966 Rothman's 12-Hour was an international sports car race held at the Surfers Paradise International Motor Circuit in Queensland, Australia on 21 August 1966. It was the first of four annual sports car endurance races held at the Queensland circuit between 1966 and 1969.

The race was won by Jackie Stewart and Andrew Buchanan driving a Ferrari 250LM.

== Classes ==
Cars competed in three classes:

- Class A – For Group 7 Two-Seater Racing Cars and Group A Sports Racing cars, divided into two sections, Under 2000cc and Over 2000cc
- Class B – For Group B Improved Production cars divided into two sections, Under 2000cc and Over 2000cc
- Class C – For Group D Series Production cars divided into two sections, Under 2000cc and Over 2000cc

== Results ==
Position	Drivers	No.	Car	Entrant	Laps
1	Jackie Stewart, Andy Buchanan	3	Ferrari 250LM	Scuderia Veloce	493
2	Peter Sutcliffe, Frank Matich	2	Ford GT40	Peter Sutcliffe (Racing) Ltd	492
3	Kevin Bartlett, Doug Chivas	9	Alfa Romeo Giulia TZ2	Alec Mildren Racing Pty Ltd	471
4	Alan Hamilton, Brian Reed	8	Porsche Spyder	Porsche Distributors Pty Ltd	451
5	Jackie Epstein, Paul Hawkins	4	Ferrari 250LM	Epstein Enterprises Ltd	441
6	Brian Foley, John French	13	Morris Cooper S	British Motor Corporation (Australia) Pty Ltd	437
	Sports Racing Over 2000cc				
1	Jackie Stewart, Andrew Buchanan	3	Ferrari 250LM	Scuderia Veloce	493
2	Peter Sutcliffe, Frank Matich	2	Ford GT40	Peter Sutcliffe (Racing) Ltd	492
3	Jackie Epstein, Paul Hawkins	4	Ferrari 250LM	Epstein Enterprises Ltd	441
4	Bill Ford, Gerry Lister, Dave Seldon	6	Volvo 122S	British & Continental Cars Pty Ltd	273
5	Ray Morris, Laurie Stewart	7	Ford XP Falcon V8	Ray Morris Motors	216
6	Tony Osborne, Murray Carter, Ray Gibbs	5	Monaco Oldsmobile	Argo Racing	96
7	David Piper, Richard Attwood	1	Ferrari 365 P2	David Piper (Racing) Ltd	45
	Sports Racing Under 2000cc				
1	Kevin Bartlett, Doug Chivas	9	Alfa Romeo Giulia TZ2	Alec Mildren Racing Pty Ltd	471
2	Alan Hamilton, Brian Reed	8	Porsche Spyder	Porsche Distributors Pty Ltd	451
3	Brian Foley, John French	13	Morris Cooper S	British Motor Corporation (Australia) Pty Ltd	437
4	Frank Demuth, John Harvey	10	Lotus 23B	RC Phillips Sports Car World Pty Ltd	408
5	Ken Stacey, Bruce McIntyre, Malcolm Henderson	16	Morris Cooper S	Marque Motors	402
6	Malcolm Bailey, John Hicks	17	Prince Skyline GT	MS Bailey	389
7	Charlie Smith, Barry Seton	15	Morris Sports	CG Smith	311
8	Don Gorringe, Richard Crawford	11	Lola	Donald Gorringe	54
9	Dick Thurston, Tom Roddy, Hugh Bryson	14	Nota Clubman	Pitstop Car Sales	48
	Improved Production Over 2000cc				
1	Ron Thorpe, Tom Sulman	18	AC Cobra	Ron Thorpe's Bargain Barn Pty Ltd	420
2	Brian Lawler, Harry Gapps	21	Daimler SP250	Brian Lawler	372
3	Ross Bond, Digby Cooke, Bill Stanley	19	Austin-Healey 3000	BP Castlecove Service Station	358
	Improved Production Under 2000cc				
1	David McKay, Bill Brown	22	Volvo P1800S	Scuderia Veloce	427
2	John Roxburgh, Doug Whiteford, Edward Colwell	31	Datsun Fairlady 1600	Datsun Australia	424
3	Richard Booty, Bill Jamieson	28	Austin-Healey Sprite	R Booty	397
4	Noel Riley, Fred Gibson	34	Honda S600	Campbell Scott Pty Ltd	397
5	Errol Sakzewski, Henk Woelders, Geoff Sakzewski	23	Porsche Carrera	DG Sakzewski	386
6			Austin-Healey Sprite		376
7			Austin-Healey Sprite		330
8			Austin-Healey Sprite		195
9			Austin-Healey Sprite		195
10	Colin Weat, Ron Kearns	24	MGA Twin Cam	MG Car Club (NSW)	142
11	Max Stewart, Bob Young	33	Triumph Spitfire SII	Max Stewart Motors	69
	Series Production Over 2000cc				
1	Bryan Thomson, Glyn Scott	35	Jaguar E-Type	Shepparton Truck Sales	418
	Series Production Under 2000cc				
1	Jim Quinn, Paul Mander	37	Lotus Elan S2	HQ Performance Motors (Canberra)	418
2	Bob Holden, John Underwood, John Collins	39	MGB	Everybody's Magazine	406
3	Colin Bond, Barry Ferguson, Arthur Treloar	43	Isuzu Bellett GT	Griffon Motors	402
4	Barry Tapsall, Bill Gates	45	Datsun SSS	Barry Tapsall	399
5	Johnny Maroulis, Ian Ferguson	38	Lotus Elan	Cominos Pharmacy	375
6	Albert Sedaitis, Peter Brown, Grahame Wood	42	Morgan +4 SS	Ecurie Canberra	372
7	John Leffler, Les Carne	41	Austin-Healey Sprite	John Leffler	229
8	Noel Riley, Leo Stanton, Jim Palmer	44	Honda S600	Stanton Motors Ltd	227
