= 1967 British Sports Car Championship =

Seasons
- ← 1966 1968 →

The 1967 British Sports Car Championship was the fourth season of the British Sports Car Championship.

== Results ==
Races in bold, when also rounds of the World Championship for Makes.

Round	Date	Circuit	Winning driver(s)	Team	Winning car
1	23 March	Snetterton	(Australia) Paul Hawkins	Paul Hawkins Racing	Ford GT40
2	19 April	Silverstone	(New Zealand) Denny Hulme	Sid Taylor	Ford GT40
3	29 April	Silverstone	(United Kingdom) David Piper	D. Piper	Ferrari 250 LM
4	20 May	Silverstone	(Australia) Paul Hawkins	Paul Hawkins Racing	Ford GT40
5	**30 July**	**Brands Hatch**	(United Kingdom) **Mike Spence** (United States) **Phil Hill**	**Chaparral Cars**	**Chaparral 2F-Chevrolet**
6	28 August	Brands Hatch	(United Kingdom) David Piper	D. Piper	Ferrari 250 LM
7	16 September	Oulton Park	(Australia) Paul Hawkins	Paul Hawkins Racing	Ford GT40
