= 2007 FIA GT Tourist Trophy =

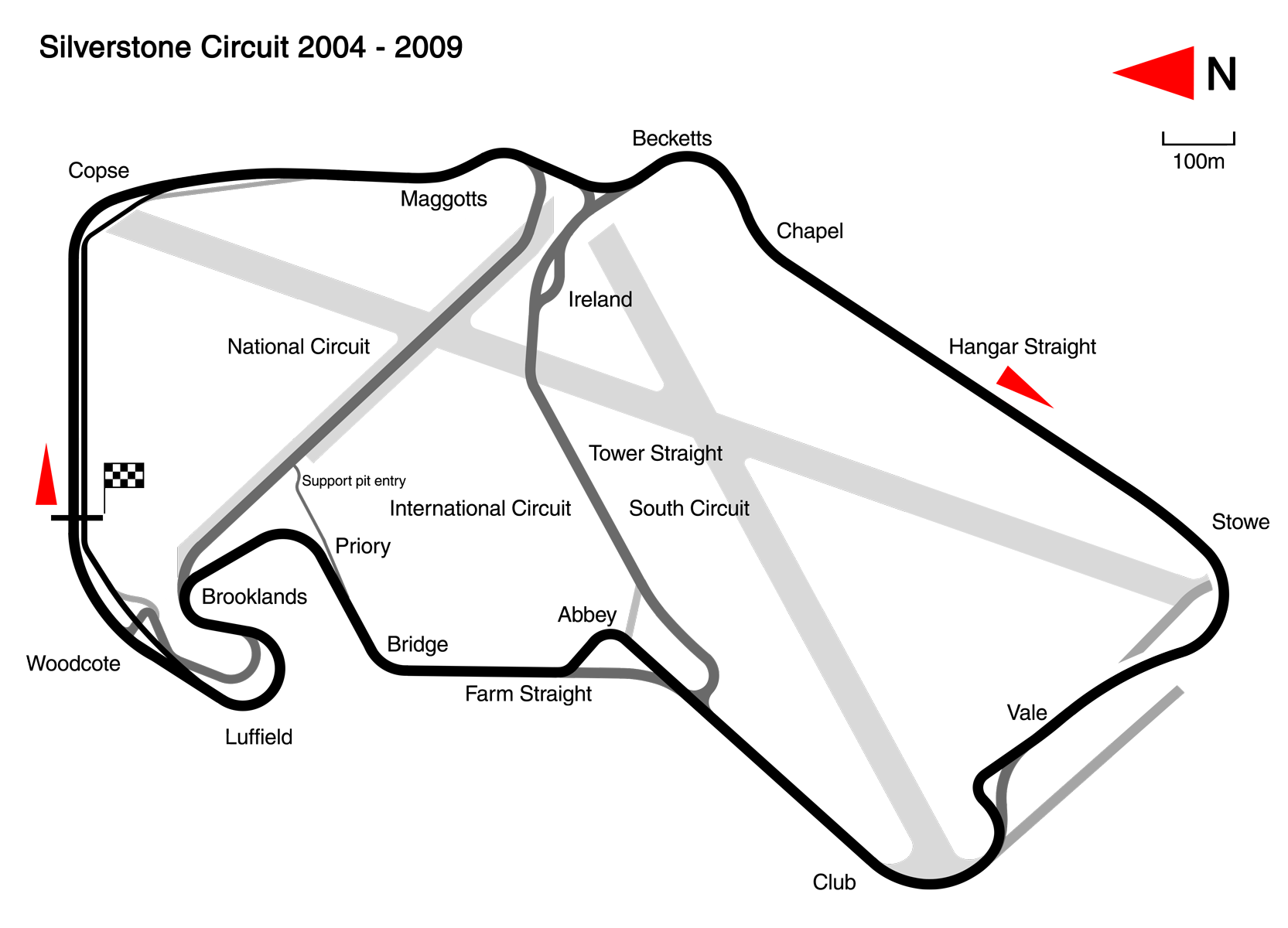
Map of the Silverstone Circuit (2004-2009)

The 2007 FIA GT RAC Tourist Trophy was the second race of the 2007 FIA GT Championship season. It took place at Silverstone Circuit on May 6, 2007. It was the third time the RAC Tourist Trophy was held as a round of the FIA GT Championship.

== Official results ==
Class winners in bold. Cars failing to complete 75% of winner's distance marked as Not Classified (NC). Cars with a C under their class are running in the Citation Cup, with the winner marked in bold italics.

| Pos | Class | No | Team | Drivers | Chassis | Tyre | Laps |
| Pos | Class | No | Team | Drivers | Engine | Tyre | Laps |
|---|---|---|---|---|---|---|---|
| 1 | **GT1** | **1** | **(Germany) Vitaphone Racing Team** | **(Finland) Mika Salo (Italy) Thomas Biagi** | **Maserati MC12 GT1** | MI | **66** |
| 1 | **GT1** | **1** | **(Germany) Vitaphone Racing Team** | **(Finland) Mika Salo (Italy) Thomas Biagi** | **Maserati 6.0L V12** | MI | **66** |
| 2 | GT1 | 5 | (Netherlands) Carsport Holland (Germany) Phoenix Racing | (Netherlands) Mike Hezemans (Switzerland) Jean-Denis Délétraz | Chevrolet Corvette C6.R | MI | 66 |
| 2 | GT1 | 5 | (Netherlands) Carsport Holland (Germany) Phoenix Racing | (Netherlands) Mike Hezemans (Switzerland) Jean-Denis Délétraz | Chevrolet 7.0L V8 | MI | 66 |
| 3 | GT1 | 4 | (Belgium) PK Carsport | (Belgium) Anthony Kumpen (Belgium) Bert Longin | Chevrolet Corvette C5-R | MI | 66 |
| 3 | GT1 | 4 | (Belgium) PK Carsport | (Belgium) Anthony Kumpen (Belgium) Bert Longin | Chevrolet 7.0L V8 | MI | 66 |
| 4 | GT1 | 33 | (Austria) Jetalliance Racing | (Austria) Karl Wendlinger (United Kingdom) Ryan Sharp | Aston Martin DBR9 | MI | 66 |
| 4 | GT1 | 33 | (Austria) Jetalliance Racing | (Austria) Karl Wendlinger (United Kingdom) Ryan Sharp | Aston Martin 6.0L V12 | MI | 66 |
| 5 | GT1 | 11 | (Italy) Scuderia Playteam Sarafree | (Italy) Andrea Bertolini (Italy) Andrea Piccini | Maserati MC12 GT1 | P | 66 |
| 5 | GT1 | 11 | (Italy) Scuderia Playteam Sarafree | (Italy) Andrea Bertolini (Italy) Andrea Piccini | Maserati 6.0L V12 | P | 66 |
| 6 | GT1 | 2 | (Germany) Vitaphone Racing Team | (Portugal) Miguel Ramos (San Marino) Christian Montanari | Maserati MC12 GT1 | MI | 65 |
| 6 | GT1 | 2 | (Germany) Vitaphone Racing Team | (Portugal) Miguel Ramos (San Marino) Christian Montanari | Maserati 6.0L V12 | MI | 65 |
| 7 | GT1 | 23 | (Italy) Aston Martin Racing BMS | (United Kingdom) Jamie Davies (Italy) Fabio Babini | Aston Martin DBR9 | P | 65 |
| 7 | GT1 | 23 | (Italy) Aston Martin Racing BMS | (United Kingdom) Jamie Davies (Italy) Fabio Babini | Aston Martin 6.0L V12 | P | 65 |
| 8 | GT1 | 12 | (Italy) Scuderia Playteam Sarafree | (Italy) Giambattista Giannoccaro (Italy) Alessandro Pier Guidi | Maserati MC12 GT1 | P | 65 |
| 8 | GT1 | 12 | (Italy) Scuderia Playteam Sarafree | (Italy) Giambattista Giannoccaro (Italy) Alessandro Pier Guidi | Maserati 6.0L V12 | P | 65 |
| 9 | GT1 | 7 | (Germany) All-Inkl.com Racing | (Germany) Marc Basseng (Germany) Stefan Mücke | Lamborghini Murcielago R-GT | MI | 65 |
| 9 | GT1 | 7 | (Germany) All-Inkl.com Racing | (Germany) Marc Basseng (Germany) Stefan Mücke | Lamborghini 6.0L V12 | MI | 65 |
| 10 | GT1 | 17 | (United Kingdom) Barwell Motorsports | (United Kingdom) Piers Johnson (United Kingdom) Jonathan Cocker | Aston Martin DBR9 | MI | 65 |
| 10 | GT1 | 17 | (United Kingdom) Barwell Motorsports | (United Kingdom) Piers Johnson (United Kingdom) Jonathan Cocker | Aston Martin 6.0L V12 | MI | 65 |
| 11 | GT1 | 36 | (Austria) Jetalliance Racing | (Austria) Lukas Lichtner-Hoyer (Austria) Robert Lechner | Aston Martin DBR9 | MI | 64 |
| 11 | GT1 | 36 | (Austria) Jetalliance Racing | (Austria) Lukas Lichtner-Hoyer (Austria) Robert Lechner | Aston Martin 6.0L V12 | MI | 64 |
| 12 | GT1 | 22 | (Italy) Aston Martin Racing BMS | (Italy) Enrico Toccacelo (Italy) Ferdinando Monfardini | Aston Martin DBR9 | P | 64 |
| 12 | GT1 | 22 | (Italy) Aston Martin Racing BMS | (Italy) Enrico Toccacelo (Italy) Ferdinando Monfardini | Aston Martin 6.0L V12 | P | 64 |
| 13 | GT1 | 19 | (Belgium) PSI Experience | (United Kingdom) Luke Hines (Austria) Philipp Peter | Chevrolet Corvette C6.R | P | 64 |
| 13 | GT1 | 19 | (Belgium) PSI Experience | (United Kingdom) Luke Hines (Austria) Philipp Peter | Chevrolet 7.0L V8 | P | 64 |
| 14 | **GT2** | **50** | **(Italy) AF Corse Motorola** | **(Finland) Toni Vilander (Germany) Dirk Müller** | **Ferrari F430 GT2** | MI | **63** |
| 14 | **GT2** | **50** | **(Italy) AF Corse Motorola** | **(Finland) Toni Vilander (Germany) Dirk Müller** | **Ferrari 4.0L V8** | MI | **63** |
| 15 | **GT1**; **C** | **18** | **(Belgium) Selleslagh Racing Team** | **(Belgium) Tom Cloet** **(Finland) Pertti Kuismanen** | **Chevrolet Corvette C5-R** | MI | **62** |
| 15 | **GT1**; **C** | **18** | **(Belgium) Selleslagh Racing Team** | **(Belgium) Tom Cloet** **(Finland) Pertti Kuismanen** | **Chevrolet 7.0L V8** | MI | **62** |
| 16 | GT2 | 52 | (Italy) Racing Team Edil Cris | (Italy) Paolo Ruberti (France) Damien Pasini | Ferrari F430 GT2 | P | 62 |
| 16 | GT2 | 52 | (Italy) Racing Team Edil Cris | (Italy) Paolo Ruberti (France) Damien Pasini | Ferrari 4.0L V8 | P | 62 |
| 17 | GT2 | 53 | (Italy) Racing Team Edil Cris | (Italy) Matteo Cressoni (Italy) Michele Rugolo | Ferrari F430 GT2 | P | 62 |
| 17 | GT2 | 53 | (Italy) Racing Team Edil Cris | (Italy) Matteo Cressoni (Italy) Michele Rugolo | Ferrari 4.0L V8 | P | 62 |
| 18 | GT2 | 97 | (Italy) BMS Scuderia Italia | (France) Emmanuel Collard (Italy) Matteo Malucelli | Porsche 997 GT3-RSR | P | 62 |
| 18 | GT2 | 97 | (Italy) BMS Scuderia Italia | (France) Emmanuel Collard (Italy) Matteo Malucelli | Porsche 3.8L Flat-6 | P | 62 |
| 19 | GT2 | 62 | (United Kingdom) Scuderia Ecosse | (United Kingdom) Tim Mullen (United Kingdom) Andrew Kirkaldy | Ferrari F430 GT2 | P | 62 |
| 19 | GT2 | 62 | (United Kingdom) Scuderia Ecosse | (United Kingdom) Tim Mullen (United Kingdom) Andrew Kirkaldy | Ferrari 4.0L V8 | P | 62 |
| 20 | GT2 | 99 | (United Kingdom) Tech9 Motorsport | (Russia) Leo Machitski (United Kingdom) Sean Edwards | Porsche 997 GT3-RSR | MI | 62 |
| 20 | GT2 | 99 | (United Kingdom) Tech9 Motorsport | (Russia) Leo Machitski (United Kingdom) Sean Edwards | Porsche 3.8L Flat-6 | MI | 62 |
| 21 | GT2 | 63 | (United Kingdom) Scuderia Ecosse | (Canada) Chris Niarchos (United Kingdom) Nigel Mansell | Ferrari F430 GT2 | P | 61 |
| 21 | GT2 | 63 | (United Kingdom) Scuderia Ecosse | (Canada) Chris Niarchos (United Kingdom) Nigel Mansell | Ferrari 4.0L V8 | P | 61 |
| 22 | GT1; C | 16 | (Monaco) JMB Racing | (United Kingdom) Joe Macari (United Kingdom) Ben Aucott | Maserati MC12 GT1 | MI | 60 |
| 22 | GT1; C | 16 | (Monaco) JMB Racing | (United Kingdom) Joe Macari (United Kingdom) Ben Aucott | Maserati 6.0L V12 | MI | 60 |
| 23 | GT1; C | 15 | (Monaco) JMB Racing | (Netherlands) Dirk Waaijenberg (Netherlands) Peter Kutemann | Maserati MC12 GT1 | MI | 59 |
| 23 | GT1; C | 15 | (Monaco) JMB Racing | (Netherlands) Dirk Waaijenberg (Netherlands) Peter Kutemann | Maserati 6.0L V12 | MI | 59 |
| 24 | GT1; C | 14 | (France) Solution F | (France) François Jakubowski (Switzerland) François Labhardt | Ferrari 550-GTS Maranello | MI | 59 |
| 24 | GT1; C | 14 | (France) Solution F | (France) François Jakubowski (Switzerland) François Labhardt | Ferrari 5.9L V12 | MI | 59 |
| 25 | **G2; C** | **102** | **(France) Red Racing** | **(Luxembourg) Sébastien Carcone (Luxembourg) Thierry Stepec** | **Chrysler Viper GTS-R** | MI | **58** |
| 25 | **G2; C** | **102** | **(France) Red Racing** | **(Luxembourg) Sébastien Carcone (Luxembourg) Thierry Stepec** | **Chrysler 8.0L V10** | MI | **58** |
| 26 DNF | GT2 | 51 | (Italy) AF Corse Motorola | (Italy) Gianmaria Bruni (Brazil) Jaime Melo | Ferrari F430 GT2 | MI | 44 |
| 26 DNF | GT2 | 51 | (Italy) AF Corse Motorola | (Italy) Gianmaria Bruni (Brazil) Jaime Melo | Ferrari 4.0L V8 | MI | 44 |
| 27 DNF | GT1; C | 21 | (Switzerland) Kessel Racing | (Switzerland) Loris Kessel (Switzerland) Massimo Cattori | Ferrari 575-GTC Maranello | MI | 43 |
| 27 DNF | GT1; C | 21 | (Switzerland) Kessel Racing | (Switzerland) Loris Kessel (Switzerland) Massimo Cattori | Ferrari 6.0L V12 | MI | 43 |
| 28 DNF | G2 | 101 | (Belgium) Belgian Racing | (Belgium) Bas Leinders (Belgium) Renaud Kuppens | Gillet Vertigo Streiff | MI | 41 |
| 28 DNF | G2 | 101 | (Belgium) Belgian Racing | (Belgium) Bas Leinders (Belgium) Renaud Kuppens | Alfa Romeo 3.6L V6 | MI | 41 |
| 29 DNF | GT2 | 74 | (Italy) Ebimotors | (Italy) Emanuele Busnelli (Italy) Marcello Zani | Porsche 997 GT3-RSR | MI | 32 |
| 29 DNF | GT2 | 74 | (Italy) Ebimotors | (Italy) Emanuele Busnelli (Italy) Marcello Zani | Porsche 3.8L Flat-6 | MI | 32 |
| 30 DNF | GT1 | 8 | (Germany) All-Inkl.com Racing | (Netherlands) Jos Menten (Netherlands) Peter Kox | Lamborghini Murcielago R-GT | MI | 26 |
| 30 DNF | GT1 | 8 | (Germany) All-Inkl.com Racing | (Netherlands) Jos Menten (Netherlands) Peter Kox | Lamborghini 6.0L V12 | MI | 26 |

== Statistics ==
- Pole Position – #5 Carsport Holland – 1:43.504
- Average Speed – 167.74 km/h

FIA GT Championship
| Previous race: 2007 FIA GT Zhuhai 2 Hours | 2007 season | Next race: 2007 FIA GT Bucharest 2 Hours |
