= 1968 British Sports Car Championship =

Seasons
- ← 1967 1969 →

The 1968 RAC British Sports Car Championship was the fifth season of the British Sports Car Championship.

The championship was won by Bill Bradley driving a Porsche Carrera 6.

== Results ==
Races shown in bold were also rounds of the 1968 International Championship for Makes.

Round	Date	Circuit	Winning driver(s)	Team	Winning car
Rd. 1	**7 April**	**Brands Hatch**	(Belgium) **Jacky Ickx** (United Kingdom) **Brian Redman**	**J.W. Automotive Engineering**	**Ford GT40**
Rd. 2	12 April	Oulton Park	(United Kingdom) Brian Redman	Sid Taylor Racing	Lola T70 Mk.3-Chevrolet
Rd. 3	27 April	Silverstone	(New Zealand) Denny Hulme	The Steering Wheel Club of West Bromwich	Lola T70 Mk.3-Chevrolet
Rd. 4	3 June	Oulton Park	(New Zealand) Denny Hulme	Sid Taylor Racing	Lola T70 Mk.3-Chevrolet
Rd. 5	23 June	Mallory Park	(Australia) Frank Gardner	The Steering Wheel Club of West Bromwich	Lola T70 Mk.3-Chevrolet
Rd. 6	27 July	Silverstone	(New Zealand) Denny Hulme	Sid Taylor Racing	Lola T70 Mk.3-Chevrolet
Rd. 7	17 August	Oulton Park	(United Kingdom) Mike de Udy	Mike de Udy	Lola T70 Mk.3-Chevrolet
Rd. 8	2 September	Brands Hatch	(Australia) Frank Gardner	The Steering Wheel Club of West Bromwich	Lola T70 Mk.3-Chevrolet
