= 1969 British Sports Car Championship =

Seasons
- ← 1968 1970 →

The 1969 British Sports Car Championship was the sixth season of the British Sports Car Championship. With exception of the Brands Hatch 6 Hours, all races were won by a Lola T70 Mk.3/Mk.3B.

The championship was won by John Lepp driving a Chevron B8.

== Results ==
Races in bold, were also rounds of the International Championship for Makes.

Round	Date	Circuit	Winning driver(s)	Team	Winning car
1	30 March	Silverstone	(New Zealand) Denny Hulme	John Woolfe Racing	Lola-Chevrolet T70 Mk.3 GT
2	4 April	Snetterton	(Australia) Paul Hawkins	Paul Hawkins Racing	Lola-Chevrolet T70 Mk.3B GT
3	7 April	Thruxton	(United Kingdom) Brian Redman	Sidney Taylor	Lola-Chevrolet T70 Mk.3B GT
4	**13 April**	**Brands Hatch**	(Switzerland) **Jo Siffert** (United Kingdom) **Brian Redman**	**Porsche System Engineering**	**Porsche 908/02**
5	17 May	Silverstone	(United Kingdom) Chris Craft	Techspeed Racing	Lola-Chevrolet T70 Mk.3 GT
6	26 May	Oulton Park	(United Kingdom) Trevor Taylor	Team Elite	Lola-Chevrolet T70 Mk.3B GT
7	13 July	Croft	(United Kingdom) Chris Craft	Techspeed Racing	Lola-Chevrolet T70 Mk.3 GT
8	10 August	Thruxton	(New Zealand) Denny Hulme	Sid Taylor Racing	Lola-Chevrolet T70 Mk.3B GT
