= Gardner Douglas =

GD Mk3
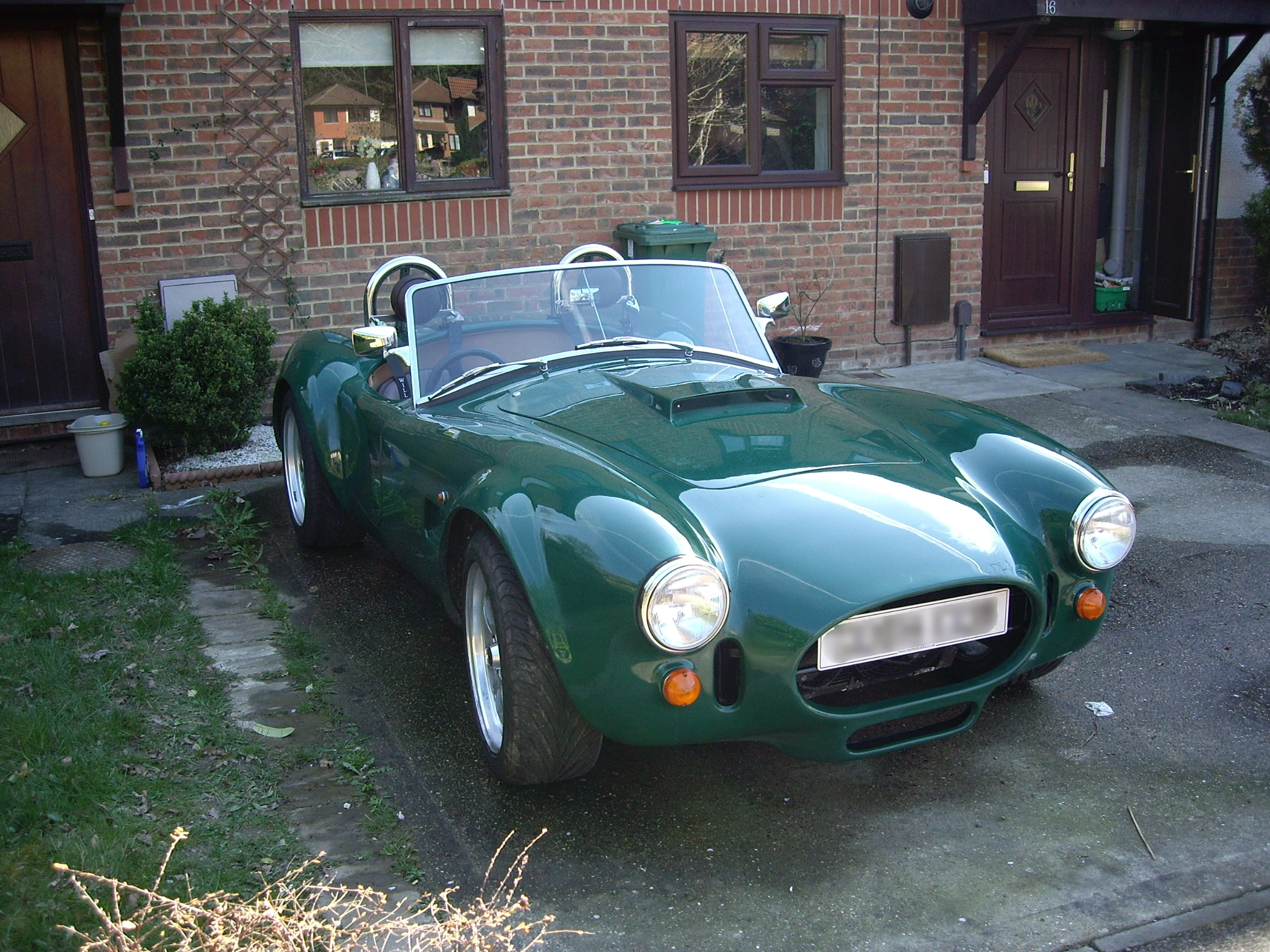

Overview
- Production: 1990 to date

Powertrain
- Engine: 5.7L V8

GD Mk4

Overview
- Production: 2007 to date

Powertrain
- Engine: 6.0L V8 7.0L V8

GD T70 Spyder

Overview
- Production: 2007 to date

Powertrain
- Engine: 6.0L V8 7.0L V8

Gardner Douglas is a British low volume sports car manufacturer, based in Grantham, Lincolnshire, England. Their models include replicas of the AC Cobra and the Lola T70.

== History and development ==
Just 26 MkIII 289 Cobras were made before AC collapsed in 1967 and so the enduring popular image of the marque is the Shelby 427 Cobra which became legend after winning class honours at Le Mans in 1965.

== Models ==
=== GD Mk3 ===
Based on the AC Mk.3 289, the Mk.3 comes with two chassis options. The first utilises refurbished Jaguar suspension whereas the second "Euro" option uses bespoke racing suspension, with double wishbone coilover suspension and cast alloy uprights. The chassis is a steel triangulated backbone type with a GRP semi-monocoque body mounted on top. It's available as a factory built car or in component form for self-assembly.

=== GD Mk4 ===
Demand for AC Cobra 427 replicas saw the launch of the Mk.IV. With the same proven chassis, the Mk.IV enables owners to specify sidepipes which were difficult to fit on the earlier model. Component form for self-assembly is available and allows many types of engine to be fitted including Rover, Ford and Chevrolet small block V8's. As of 2003, the standard factory fitted engine is the GM LS series V8 with five and six speed transmissions options.e

=== GD T70 Spyder ===
Based on the iconic Lola T70 from the 1960s. The chassis differs from the mk3 and mk4, it being a fully triangulated tubular spaceframe with alloy and GRP composite panels. The transmission is borrowed from Porsche and factory engine options are from the GM LS series of V8's, from 450bhp up to 700bhp.

=== GD T70 Moda ===
The Moda is similar to the T70 Spyder but comes with better weather protection in the form of a modular roof system. It's available as a factory built car or in component form for self-assembly.

=== GD 350 ===
The 350 has the standard GD backbone chassis with a body shape loosely based on the AC Cobra. The car is limited to 50 units and is sold as a limited edition.
