= 1965 British Sports Car Championship =

Seasons
- ← 1964 1966 →

The 1965 British Sports Car Championship was the second season of the British Sports Car Championship.

== Results ==
Races in bold, when also rounds of the World Championship for Makes.

Round	Date	Circuit	Winning driver	Team	Winning car
1	20 March	Silverstone	(United Kingdom) Jim Clark	Team Lotus	Lotus 30 Ford
2	19 April	Goodwood	(United Kingdom) Jim Clark	Team Lotus	Lotus 30 Ford
3	**1 May**	**Oulton Park**	**(New Zealand) Denny Hulme**	**Sidney Taylor Racing**	**Brabham BT8 Climax**
4	15 May	Silverstone	(New Zealand) Bruce McLaren	Bruce McLaren Motor Racing Ltd	McLaren Elva M1A Oldsmobile
5	6 June	Mallory Park	(United Kingdom) David Hobbs	Harold Young Racing	Lola T70 Ford
6	24 July	Silverstone	(New Zealand) Chris Amon	Bruce McLaren Motor Racing Ltd	McLaren Elva M1A Oldsmobile
7	15 August	Croft	(United Kingdom) David Hobbs	Harold Young Racing	Lola T70 Ford
8	30 August	Brands Hatch	(United Kingdom) John Surtees	Team Surtees Ltd.	Lola T70 Mk. 2 Chevrolet
