= 1966 British Sports Car Championship =

List British Sports Car Championship

Seasons
- ← 1965 1967 →

The 1966 British Sports Car Championship was the third season of the British Sports Car Championship. The season was dominated by Brabham's Formula One driver, Denny Hulme, by winning the first five races of the season, abroad Sidney Taylor's Lola T70 Mk2. This model of car was also victorious in the remaining two races, in the hands of the 1964 World Champion, John Surtees.

== Results ==
Round	Date	Circuit	Winning driver	Team	Winning car
Rd. 1	8 April	Snetterton	(New Zealand) Denny Hulme	Sid Taylor	Lola T70 Mk.2-Chevrolet
Rd. 2	29 April	Oulton Park	(New Zealand) Denny Hulme	Sidney Taylor	Lola T70 Mk.2-Chevrolet
Rd. 3	14 May	Silverstone	(New Zealand) Denny Hulme	Sidney Taylor Racing	Lola T70 Mk.2-Chevrolet
Rd. 4	28 May	Mallory Park	(New Zealand) Denny Hulme	Sidney Taylor Racing	Lola T70 Mk.2-Chevrolet
Rd. 5	9 July	Silverstone	(New Zealand) Denny Hulme	Sidney Taylor Racing	Lola T70 Mk.2-Chevrolet
Rd. 6	14 August	Croft	(United Kingdom) John Surtees	Team Surtees	Lola T70 Mk.2-Chevrolet
Rd. 7	29 August	Brands Hatch	(United Kingdom) John Surtees	Team Surtees	Lola T70 Mk.2-Chevrolet
