= Hugh Dibley =

British aviator, racing driver, and racecar constructor

- Born: April 29, 1937 (age 89); Hong Kong

Hugh Palliser Kingsley Dibley is a former commercial airline pilot and flight crew trainer who developed methods to conserve fuel and limit noise during aircraft operations. He was also a successful racing driver and race car builder.

== Early years ==
Dibley was born in Hong Kong. His parents were Engineer Rear-Admiral Albert Kingsley Dibley and Penelope Dibley (née Frend, a descendant of Admiral Sir Hugh Palliser). When Dibley was born his father was chief engineer at the Royal Navy's Hong Kong dockyard. The family returned to England in 1939 just before the war, moving frequently. His father's final naval posting was to the Devonport dockyard.

Upon his retirement, Dibley's father pursued his interest in farming and in 1948 bought a smallholding in the district of Lee-on-the-Solent, with a house just metres from the end of Runway 36 at the Air Fleet Arm's RNAS Lee-on-Solent (HMS Daedalus). The sight of the planes taking off and landing there sparked Dibley's interest in aviation.

He attended school at Pinewood, and then at Marlborough College.

== Military career ==
Dibley joined the Combined Cadet Force, initially enlisting in the Royal Navy section. He later transferred to the Royal Air Force section to take the RAF pilot aptitude selection with the goal of obtaining a private pilot's licence (PPL). He completed his required 30 hours in a De Havilland Tiger Moth from the Royal Naval Flying Club, Gosport, and received his PPL shortly after turning seventeen.

Dibley began as a Naval Airman Second Class I, then was appointed a Midshipman (A) Royal Naval Volunteer Reserve (RNVR) after a two month long officer training course. This qualified him to start flying training in Piston Provosts at RAF Syerston near Grantham. Deep defence cuts that arrived in 1957 put an end to all Volunteer Reserve flight training, so Dibley completed his two years of National Service aboard HMS Ark Royal.

== Aviation career ==
As his military service was ending, Dibley was advised both by the future Admiral Sir Frank Hopkins, who was his Captain aboard the Ark Royal, and by his maternal uncle Captain Peter Frend, RN, to pursue a career in civil aviation. He submitted an application to British Overseas Airways Corporation (BOAC), who recommended that he take a short course at Air Service Training, Hamble to upgrade his license to a Commercial Pilots Licence (CPL) and obtain his Instrument rating. His CPL was granted in September 1958, and he was subsequently hired by BOAC as part of the Pilots’ Initial Navigation (PIN) Scheme."

Early in his career he flew on the Douglas DC-7C, then went on to crew the Bristol Britannia 312, the Bristol Britannia 102, and the De Havilland Comet 4.

When the Boeing 707 entered service at BOAC the flight crew was made up of two pilots and a navigator, but the British Airline Pilots' Association (BALPA) wanted crews of three pilots, so the decision was made to transfer all the PIN pilots to the 707 as pilot-navigators. Dibley did his pilot's course after one year, and qualified as First Officer. He started with routes in the North Atlantic, and later transferred to routes to Africa and the Far East.

In 1966 he joined the 707 Check Nav Office, where his duties included inspecting all navigators’ logs and charts for problems, performing annual checks to confirm their individual competence, and training new pilots to navigate in service.

...like landing a block of flats from the second floor.

— Hugh Dibley, on landing a Boeing 747.

BOAC received its first Boeing 747 in April 1970, but did not put the aircraft into service for almost a year. Due to concerns with the plane's new Inertial Navigation System (INS), Dibley was assigned to the first 747 course as a nav instructor in the event the INS failed and the third crew member was required to act as navigator. As the INS proved to be very reliable, Dibley then became a First Officer Assistant Instructor on the 747 flight simulator. He completed the UK Civil Aviation Authority (CAA) Flight Instrument Examiners Course, after which he conducted annual simulator checks on First Officers needing to renew their 747 Type and Instrument Ratings, and taught 747 transition courses and annual recurrent training to captains and First Officers.

The Civil Aviation Act of 1971 included the establishment of a British Airways Board with control over all activities of BOAC and British European Airways (BEA). The British Airways Board was officially formed on 1 April 1972, with oversight of both BOAC and BEA, although the two companies continued to operate as separate entities. In 1972 Dibley began working to find ways to improve the fuel efficiency of BOAC's Boeing 747 fleet.

BOAC and BEA were brought under the British Airways brand, which began flying on 1 April 1974. The old names were replaced by British Airways Overseas Division (BAOD) and British Airways European Division (BAED) respectively, but these continued to operate separately.

Early in 1975, at age 37, Dibley became the first of BA's First Officers to be given direct command of the 747. Since he had already qualified as a Type Rating Examiner, the CAA permitted him to become a Training/Check Captain after logging two hundred hours of line flying. After that, as the most junior captain in the company, he become a Training Captain on both the 747 aircraft and simulator.

Also in 1975, BA decided to return two Lockheed L-1011 TriStars to service on routes to the Persian Gulf and through to India. A dozen of these aircraft had been ordered by BEA. Dibley was asked to join the group of captains selected for the operation as Training Captain. Although it meant leaving the 747 Flight, it offered him the opportunity to be trained directly by the Lockheed Corporation. He was appointed Flight Technical Manager in 1977 and served in that role until April 1978.

In 1978 Dibley was appointed chairman of a newly formed Fuel Policy and Fuel Conservation Working Group.

British Airways had contracts to operate private aircraft for the Heads of States in Abu Dhabi and Qatar. They also obtained a contract for a private Saudi 707. In 1982 BA authorized its commercial divisions to choose their own aircraft and Dibley was among those asked to help re-launch the legacy 707 operation. From October 1982 to March 1983 BA 707s operated Middle East and African routes to Baghdad and Lilongwe, Malawi until a final around-the-world charter flight in May 1983, after which he returned to the 747 Flight, first as a management pilot, and then as Flight Manager Technical in 1987. He continued flying the Air Mauritius and VIP 707s in the Private Flight of Zayed bin Sultan Al Nahyan in Abu Dhabi. These Flight Crew Contracts became known as Dibley’s Air Force.

On 20 March 1984, while piloting the same 747 that was involved in the 1982 Jakarta incident, Dibley was on approach to Perth, Australia when a starboard engine exploded while the aircraft was just 49 ft (14.9 m) above the tarmac. Dibley notified the tower, then diverted over water to dump excess fuel, and landed the plane safely.

On 22 May 1984 Dibley accompanied the CAA's Chief Test Pilot on a Certificate of Airworthiness Test Flight of the last British Airtours 707 prior to its sale. He was subsequently cleared to fly 707 C/A Test Flights, which he later performed for British Caledonian, Transcorp and Air Hong Kong.

In 1989 Dibley became the fleet's technical manager. That same year he was seconded to the Private Flight of Sheikh Zayed in Abu Dhabi to bring a specially fitted 747 into service. In 1990 he was appointed Acting Director Operations and Chief Pilot over a fleet of eight aircraft that also included some Airbus models.

Dibley retired from BA in 1992.

In April 1992 he joined Air Hong Kong as Technical Advisor. He became their Chief Pilot in 1993. Air Hong Kong was later bought by Cathay Pacific.

In May 1994, after completing the Airbus A340 course, he joined Air Mauritius as Director Operations, just as that airline was taking delivery of their own A340s.

After leaving Air Mauritius in August 1995 he joined Airbus Training in Toulouse as Flight Instructor. He stayed there seven years, instructing new airline crews on various aircraft, assisting in the design of flight simulator Instructor Stations, and working on flight crew procedures included in Flight Crew Operating Manuals.

Dibley retired from Airbus in 2002, but continued working as an instructor and consultant for Airbus Training UK and others.

Dibley is a Fellow of the Royal Aeronautical Society (FRAeS), a Liveryman of GAPAN, and an elected member of the French Académie de l'air et de l'espace. He is also Chairman of the Royal Aeronautical Society (RAeS) Toulouse Branch and a member of the RAeS Council.

Since the mid-1970s he has presented papers on a variety of aviation related topics including fuel conservation, operational efficiency, noise reduction, safety training, and flight simulation, among others. He was consulted on the disappearance of Malaysian Airlines Flight 370.

== Racing career ==
Dibley started his racing career in 1959 in an AC Aceca-Bristol coupé. His first race was the Nottingham Sports Car Club Silverstone meeting.

In 1961 Dibley began driving open wheeled cars in Formula Junior. He started in a Lola Mk3 fielded by Écurie Light Blue. Dibley was the driver of Mk3 chassis BRJ38 when it appeared in the 1961 Lewis-Evans Trophy. This marked the first time a Lola appeared in a Formula 1 race. In 1962 Dibley stayed with Écurie Light Blue, but switched to the Lola Mk5. It was in a Mk5 that Dibley placed second in the 1962 Nassau Speed Week Formula Junior Championship.

In 1964 Dibley switched to sports car racing with the purchase of Brabham BT8 chassis SC-2-64, driven mainly under the Stirling Moss Auto Racing Team (SMART) banner. He posted five wins and set four lap records in the Brabham that year, as well as being awarded the first "Goodwood Ton".

In 1965 Dibley switched to a Lola T70 — a model he would continue to appear in right up until 1969. In 1965 the car was entered either by Dibley himself or as a SMART entry, but in 1966 he drove T70 Mk II SL71/19 as part of the "Racing Partnership" team headed by Tony Sargeant.

Dibley was scheduled to appear in the first ever Can-Am race to be held on 11 September 1966 at the Circuit Mont-Tremblant near the former town of Saint-Jovite. In practice his Lola T70 backflipped into the air, cleared a fence and landed in the spectators' area. Dibley escaped the crash without injuries. Anyone whose car subsequently performed that manoeuvre was said to have "done a Dibley".

In 1967 Dibley continued to drive T70s, now the Mk3 GT chassis SL73/105 being fielded by Michael Grace de'Udy.

From 1967 to 1969 Dibley raced a Chevrolet Camaro in the British Saloon Car Championship. The car was a Z-28 model originally sold by Gorries Downtown Chevrolet Oldsmobile in Toronto, Canada, and was one of Gorries' in-house Black Panther specials. Dibley bought it without an engine from Craig Fisher.

In 1968 Dibley was doing promotional work for the upcoming BOAC 500 race when he encountered the Howmet TX turbine-powered car. He was part of the crew on the flight that the car was shipped to the UK on, during which the car was accompanied by 36 tons of gold bullion. The car was created by Ray Heppenstall using a chassis from Bob McKee's McKee engineering, and was powered by a pair of turbines on loan from Continental Aviation & Engineering.

Dibley partnered with Dick Thompson in the car in the BOAC race at Brands Hatch. On that occasion Thompson put the car into the bank, ending their race. The car was repaired and appeared the next weekend at Oulton Park. The Howmet was lying third when Dibley pitted for fuel on lap 60, after which the engine could not be restarted because the wiring for the starter had burned out.

In 1968 Dibley made his only appearance at the 24 Hours of Le Mans. He was partnered with Bob Tullius in one of the two Howmets entered. His car went out with a failed wheel bearing.

In 1969 Dibley made another appearance at Brands Hatch in a Lola T70, this time in chassis SL76/144, partnered with Trevor Taylor as part of Taylor's Team Elite. The car did not finish.

Dibley had effectively wound up his racing career by 1973. His final appearance in a sport car event was in the 1974 1000 Kilometres of Brands Hatch, where he finished third in a Mirage GR7.

=== Day of the Champion (film) ===
In 1965 actor Steve McQueen and director John Sturges began planning a movie set in the world of Formula One (F1) racing, based on the book The Cruel Sport by American journalist and author Robert Daley. The movie, to be produced by the Warner Bros. studio, was titled Day of the Champion. At nearly the same time Metro-Goldwyn-Mayer (MGM) started work on another movie based on the same source material and starring James Garner. This movie was called Grand Prix.

A Warner Bros. film crew went to the RAC Tourist Trophy race at Oulton Park in April 1966 to capture racing footage for the McQueen movie. On this occasion Dibley stood in for McQueen, being filmed driving his SMART Lola T70 on the track with the name of McQueen's character in the movie — "PEARCE" — displayed on the rear side of the car.

Anticipating that the MGM film would hit theaters before McQueen and Sturges could finish theirs, and likely already in the midst of planning the sale of his company, studio head Jack L. Warner cancelled work on Day of the Champion. Grand Prix was released in 1966.

== Palliser Racing Design Ltd. ==
Dibley's involvement in building racing cars originated with Len Wimhurst, a tool maker who had worked for Lola and Brabham. Dibley first met Wimhurst when he bought a Formula Junior Lola, then again when Wimhurst sorted out Dibley's Brabham BT8. Wimhurst was the workshop foreman at Brabham, but wanted to build his own racing cars, and sought Dibley's help to do it.

In 1966 Wimhurst proposed that the two produce and field a racing car of their own, with Wimhurst designing the car and Dibley providing the engine and gearbox, and driving the car in competition. Wimhurst built the first chassis in the backyard of his home in Catford, South London, completing it by December 1966.

The car debuted in October 1967 at Castle Combe, where it retired with a blocked fuel line. The car was unnamed for its first few races, being entered at Mallory Park circuit as "TBN" — "To Be Notified".

At this point Bob Winkelmann got involved. Winkelmann was a former member of the Royal Navy and former BOAC traffic officer who had moved to the United States, eventually becoming owner of Robert Winkelmann Racing, a buyer and seller of racing cars. Dibley and Winkelmann had both driven in the United States Road Racing Championship (USRRC) in 1963 and 1964. After seeing Dibley's photos of the new car, Winkelmann convinced him that there was a market for it in the US. Winkelmann placed an order for three Formula B cars that were also built in Wimhurst's garage and delivered in 1968. Dibley and Winkelmann mutually agreed that the cars would be sold as Winkelmanns in the US.

In October 1968 Palliser Racing Design Limited was formed, taking Dibley's second given name for the company. The company had three directors: Dibley, Wimhurst, and Winkelmann. As principal financier, Dibley became managing director. Production was moved to a location at North Street, Clapham, South London.

The car was eventually named the WDB1; "W" for Wimhurst, "D" for Dibley, "B" for Formula B, and "1" for Series 1. Other models would follow targeted at different racing classes but following the same naming convention, including WDF for Formula Ford, WDA for Formula A, WDV for Super Vee, and WD3 for Formula 3.

In 1969 production totaled just under fifty cars, with over forty being WDF1s and the rest WDB2s. In 1970 most of the cars built went to the US again.

In mid-1970 Palliser acquired the rights to a Formula 5000 project that had been started by Frank Gardner and designer Len Bailey. The car, which had originally been named the Franklen, was renamed the Palliser WDA1.

In 1970 the company's chief market remained the US, but plans were made to increase sales in Britain after the American orders had been filled. That year another fifty Formula Ford models were built, as well as three Formula Bs and prototypes of both a Super Vee and Formula Atlantic cars.

Around 1970, to help Dibley with the workload that came with managing the company, an office manager and a secretary were hired. Australian racing driver Vern Schuppan joined Palliser as both driver and general assistant.

Palliser contracted out construction of their cars' space frames to Arch Motors in Huntingdon, who did similar work for other constructors.

Palliser also became a supplier of components for individuals and other companies building cars. They offered cast wheels, magnesium uprights, steering racks and many other parts, which were used in cars from March Engineering, McNamara, Daren and others. The oil pumps produced by Palliser were a favourite of British Racing Motors (BRM), who used them in the BRM twin-cam and Formula Ford engines. Casting of the parts was handled by Kent Alloys.

In 1971 the company expanded their workshop space, and sought to expand into other markets as sales in the US slowed. Workshop space was increased to a total of 5,000 sq ft (465 m^{2}), with the old space reserved for prototypes.

In 1971 Palliser entered into an agreement to manufacture a 2.0 L Group 5 sports car for John Green's Daren company. The car was named the Daren-Palliser Mk3. Palliser built four of the cars.

Palliser built two cars specifically for hillclimbing: WDH1 and WDH2. The first car was expected to be a one-off. Built for Mike MacDowel, it used a WDB4 Formula Two chassis and was powered by a 1967 3.0 L Repco-Brabham T740 engine that was later enlarged to 4.2 L. The second car was built for Jack Maurice. It differed from WDH1 in having a full-width nose. Power came from a lightweight 4.2 L V8 from General Motors that had been salvaged, along with the transmission, from Tony Marsh's four wheel drive March Special that Maurice had bought from Johnty Williamson and wrecked in June.

Palliser Racing Design was offered for sale in the middle of February 1972. The majority of the stock was purchased by Cambridge Sports Cars, run by Ian Mawby. A liquidator of Palliser Racing Design Ltd. was appointed on 2 March 1972.

In total Palliser built approximately 150 cars.

Wimhurst built cars under his own name for the 1972 Formula Atlantic season, then revived the old name in 1974 for the new Formula Ford 2000 series in 1975 with a car called the Palliser P742.

Over the course of their operation Palliser cars won four championships. They won the first Formula Atlantic Championship in England with Schuppan driving. In 2019 driver Cameron Jackson won the Historic Formula Ford championship in a Winkelmann.

== Personal life ==
On 27 February 1965 Dibley married Doris Jean Lockhart in Scarsdale, New York. Doris was the daughter of Chicago newspaper editor Jack H. Lockhart, and was working as a copy group head at the London office of American advertising agency Benton & Bowles at the time. The couple separated in 1967. Doris married Charles Saatchi in 1973. She died on 6 August 2025.

On 22 January 1971 Dibley married Marianne Lotta Kristina Ahlborn. The couple had two children: fraternal twins Natasha C. and Nicholas Kingsley Palliser. In July 2010 Marianne suffered hydrocephalus and a stroke that left her paralysed. She died on 29 December 2014. Son Nicholas died of a heart attack on 26 March 2020.

== Honours ==
Dibley was awarded the 1971/72 Alan Cobham prize, given to the most meritorious student pilot graduating from a college or school of civil or military aviation. This prize was renamed the Glover Trophy in 2016.

For 1979/1980 he was awarded the Guild of Air Pilots Brackley Memorial Trophy "for pioneering work on high altitude descents and noise/fuel reduction methods."

== Racing record ==
=== Complete British Saloon Car Championship results ===
(key) (Races in bold indicate pole position; races in italics indicate fastest lap.)

Year	Team	Car	Class	1	2	3	4	5	6	7	8	9	10	11	12	Pos.	Pts	Class
1967	Hugh Dibley	Chevrolet Camaro	D	BRH	SNE	SIL	SIL	MAL	SIL	SIL; Ret	BRH; 4	OUL; Ret†	BRH			24th	6	5th
1969	Hugh Dibley	Chevrolet Camaro	D	BRH	SIL	SNE	THR	SIL	CRY	MAL	CRO	SIL	OUL	BRH; Ret^	BRH	NC	0	NC

† Events with 2 races staged for the different classes.

^ Race with 2 heats - Aggregate result.

=== Complete 12 Hours of Sebring results ===
Year	Team	Co-Drivers	Car	Class	Laps	Pos.	Class Pos.
1964	(United Kingdom) Stirling Moss Auto Racing Team	(United Kingdom) R. G. Rossler	Lotus Elan	GT1.6		DNF	
1968	(United Kingdom) Michael de'Udy	(United Kingdom) Michael de'Udy	Lola T70	S5.0		DNF	

=== Complete 24 Hours of Le Mans results ===
Year	Team	Car	Teammate	Teammate	Placement	Cause of retirement
1968	United States Howmet Castings	Howmet TX	United Kingdom Bob Tullius		Disqualified	
