= Peter Sutcliffe (racing driver) =

British textile manufacturer and race driver

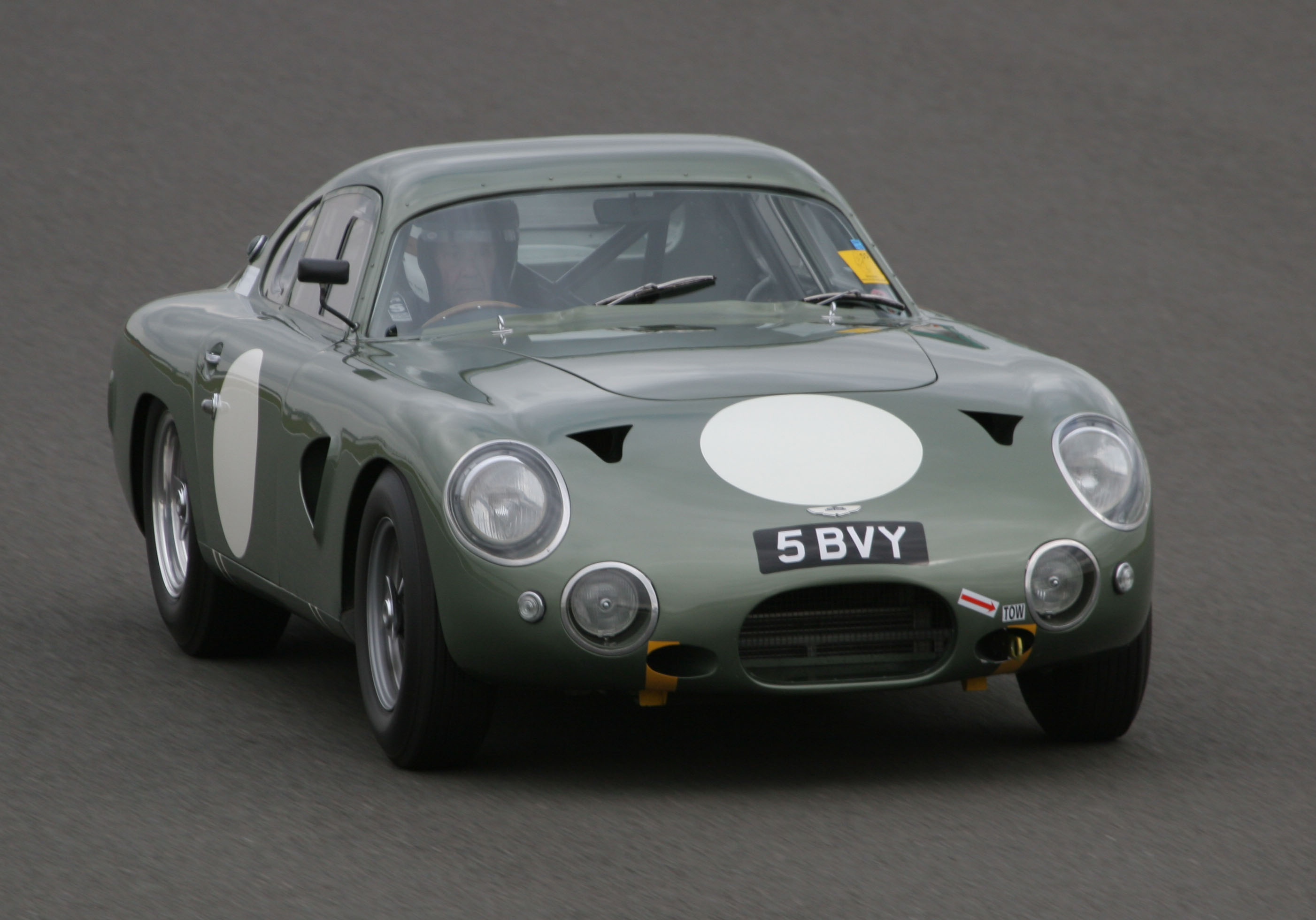
Aston Martin DP214 replica

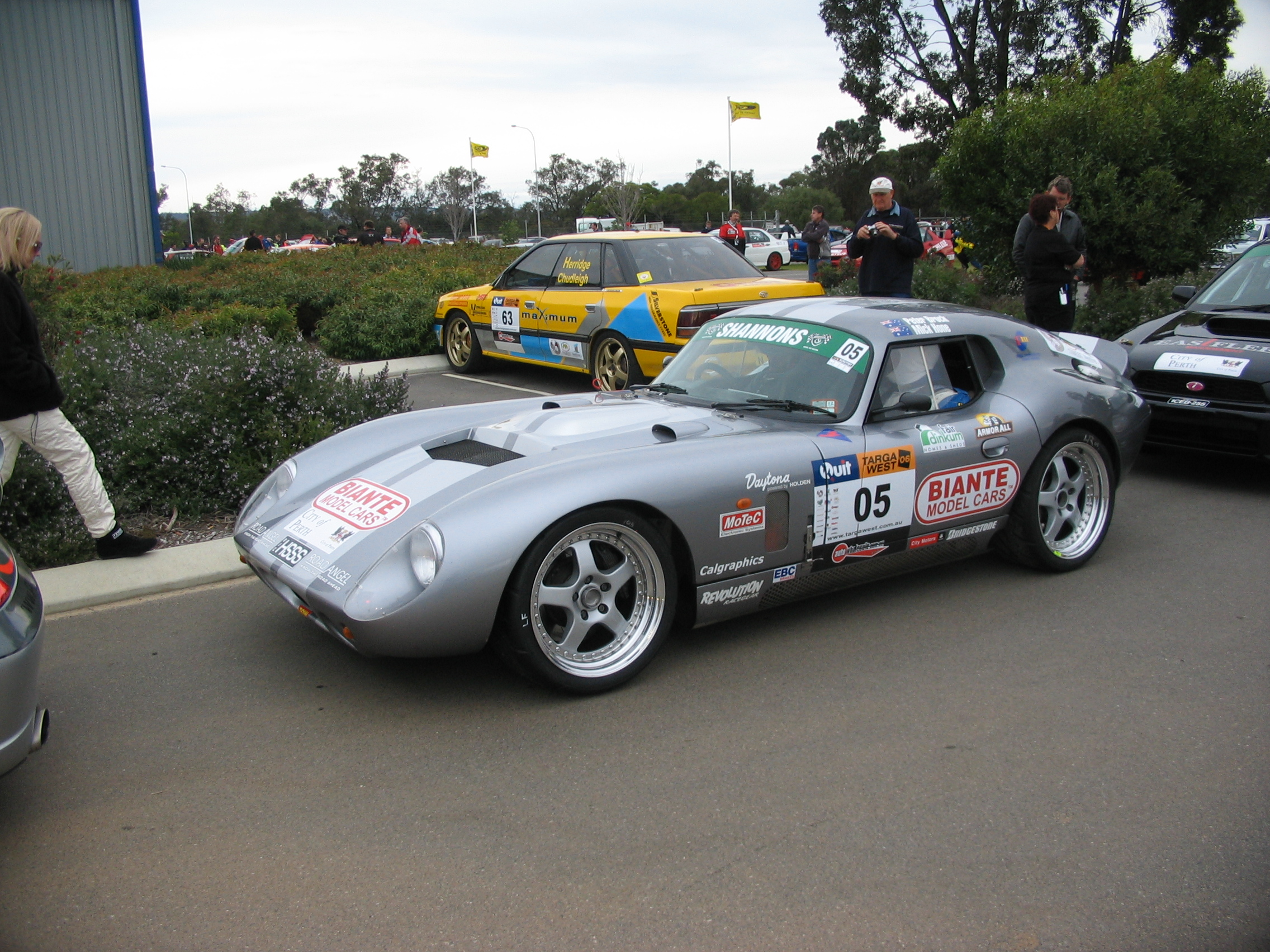
A Shelby Daytona Coupe in 2006

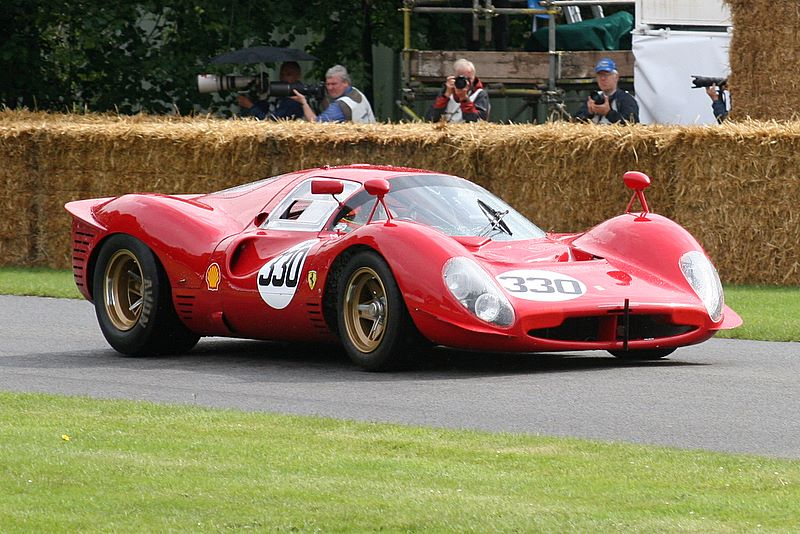
Similar to the factory 330P4, but with a detuned engine: customer Ferrari 412P (chassis 0844) at the 2007 Goodwood Festival of Speed

Peter Harry Sutcliffe (born 1 December 1936), a British textile manufacturer from Huddersfield, was active in sports car racing until 1967. Between 1959 and 1967 he won the 1964 Prix de Paris at the Autodrome de Linas-Montlhéry, and the 1965 Pietermaritzburg 3 hours. He raced in Aston Martins, Jaguar D-Type and E types, Shelby Cobra Daytona, Ford GT40s and works Ferrari 330P4s.

== Racing career ==
After starting to race in the 1950s, his career was interrupted by national service. In 1960–61, before he returned in 1962, to race a Jaguar D-Type. (Note: The epitome of a great British sports car, the Jaguar D Type. Here, Peter Sutcliffe is doing well over 100mph Tony Gardiner: Motor Racing at Goodwood in the Sixties, Veloce Publishing Ltd, 2002 ISBN 1-903706-49-1) From 1963 to 1967, he took part in events that counted towards the World Sportscar Championship, like the 1000km Nürburgring.

In 30 starts, between 1959 and 1967, he scored two overall wins, the 1964 Grand Prix de Paris at the Autodrome de Linas-Montlhéry with a Jaguar E-Type, and the 1965 Springbok Series Pietermaritzburg 3 hours with a privately entered Ford GT40. (Note: Englishman Peter H. Sutcliffe (UK) of Huddersfield owned chassis 1009 and GT112 - Ronnie Spain GT 40: An Individual History and Race Record, MotorBooks/MBI Publishing Company, 2003 ISBN 0-7603-1740-2 Google Books)

He also took part in the last race event at Germany's Solitudering in July 1965, the XIII Grosser Preis der Solitude, where he drove the Formula 2 Brabham BT10 Cosworth of David Prophet Racing. However, he crashed in his only monoposto race.

Sutcliffe was called by the Scuderia Ferrari to share one of the four Ferrari 330P4 (Chassis #0860, #19) with factory driver Günter Klass in the 1967 24 Hours of Le Mans. After Lorenzo Bandini had been killed and Mike Parkes had been badly injured in F1 races, the Scuderia had planned that Leo Cella would drive the powerful 4-litre, but the Italian rally driver refused to drive the big sportscar after a long test run at Modena circuit. The fine race of Klass and Sutcliffe had an end after 296 laps on the 19th hour due to engine failure. A week later, Sutcliffe scored his only pole position, at the Trophée d'Auvergne at Louis Rosier Circuit Charade near Clermont-Ferrand, in 3:37,6" with a Ford GT40. He finished second in the race, behind Paul Hawkins, and ahead of Jo Schlesser, both also driving GT40s.

Sutcliffe was hired again by Ferrari to drive one of the 330P4 12-cylinder prototypes at the 6 hours BOAC 500 at Brands Hatch later in the year, finishing fifth, now paired with Ludovico Scarfiotti as Klass had been killed at Mugello the weekend before.

== Races ==
- 1963: Sutcliffe crashed a Jaguar D-Type at the Snetterton Motor Racing Circuit
- 1964: 24 Hours of Le Mans Aston Martin DP214 with Mike Salmon
- 1965 24 Hours of Le Mans, Scuderia Filipinetti Shelby Cobra Daytona with Peter Harper, DNF
- 1966 24 Hours of Le Mans, Scuderia Filipinetti Ford GT40 Mk. I 4.7L V8, DNF
- 1966 Rothmans 12 Hour International Sports Car Race, Peter Sutcliffe Racing Ford GT40, with Frank Matich, 2nd behind Jackie Stewart and Andy Buchanan (Ferrari 250LM)
