= Peter Sadler =

British chemist

Peter J. Sadler is a British chemist and academic. He is Professor of Chemistry at the University of Warwick. He is known for his work in medicinal inorganic chemistry, particularly on metals in medicine and the design of metal-based drugs.

== Education ==
Sadler studied at the University of Oxford, where he obtained a BA, MA and DPhil. He later held a Medical Research Council Research Fellowship at the University of Cambridge and the National Institute for Medical Research.

== Career and research ==
From 1973 to 1996 he was a lecturer, reader and professor at Birkbeck College, University of London. From 1996 to 2007, he was Crum Brown Chair of Chemistry at the University of Edinburgh. He later joined the University of Warwick, where he served as Head of the Department of Chemistry and remained Professor of Chemistry.

Sadler has held the title of Mok Hing Yiu Distinguished Visiting professor at the University of Hong Kong.

Sadler is known for research on metal complexes in medicine, including anticancer drugs and other therapeutic applications. The Royal Society states that he was among the first researchers to investigate the chemistry of metals in medicine and that, since the 1970s, he has proposed, developed and tested many metal-based drugs. His Warwick profile describes his research interests as the chemistry of metals in medicine, including bioinorganic chemistry, inorganic chemical biology and medicine.

In 2022, Sadler was awarded the Royal Society's Davy Medal for pioneering work in medicinal inorganic chemistry, metals in medicine, and the design of new metallodrugs with novel mechanisms of action.

== Honours ==
Sadler is a Fellow of the Royal Society. According to biographical material published by the Royal Society and the University of Warwick, he is also a Fellow of the Royal Society of Edinburgh and the Royal Society of Chemistry. Honours listed by Warwick include the 2022 Royal Society of Chemistry Dalton Division Horizon Prize and the 2025 Blaise Pascal Medal in Chemistry.
