= David Piper (racing driver) =

British racing driver (born 1930)

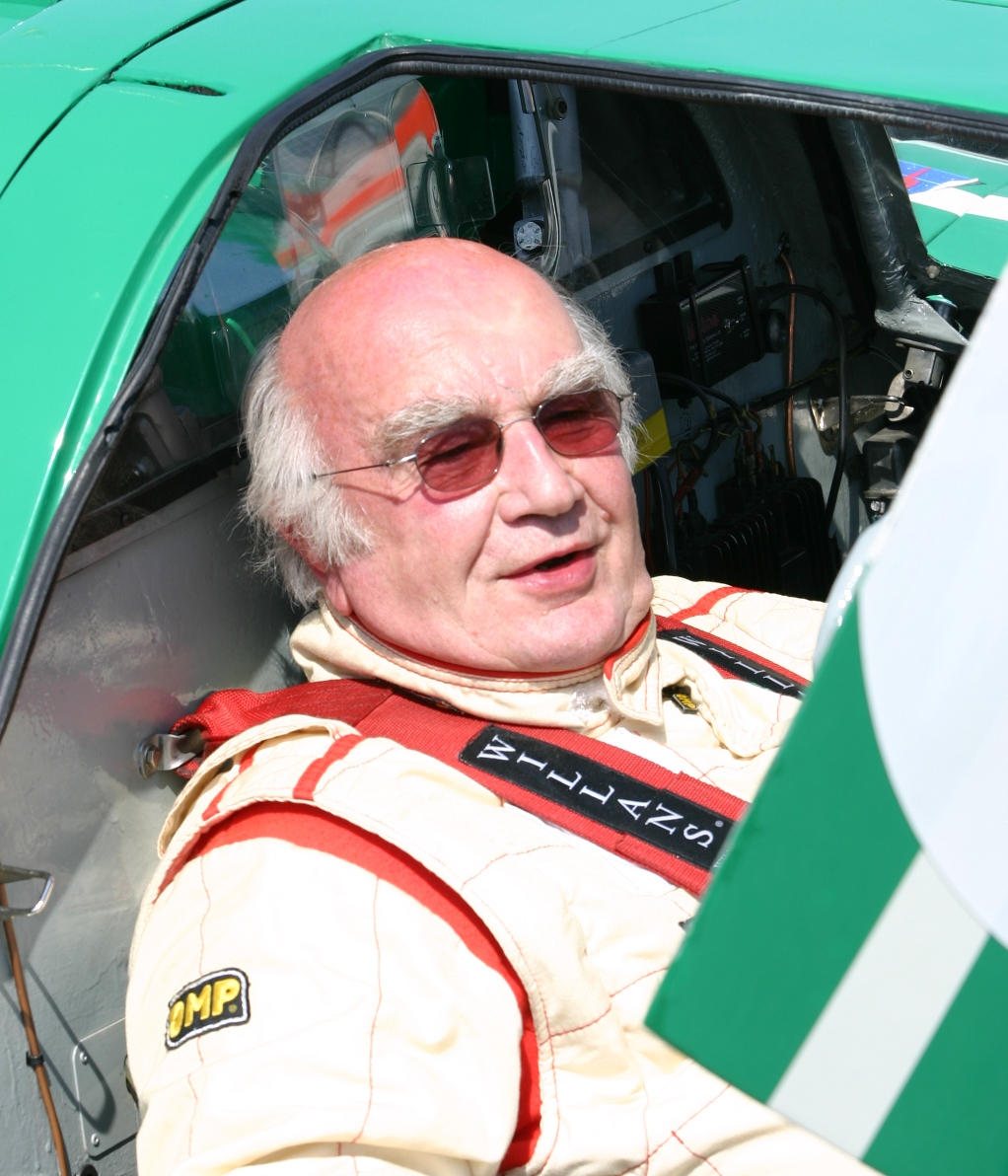
- Piper, 2009, Hockenheimring
- Born: 2 December 1930 (age 95); Edgware, Middlesex, England

Formula One World Championship career
- Nationality: (United Kingdom) British
- Active years: 1959–1960
- Team: non-works Lotus
- Entries: 3 (2 starts)
- Championships: 0
- Wins: 0
- Podiums: 0
- Career points: 0
- Pole positions: 0
- Fastest laps: 0
- First entry: 1959 British Grand Prix
- Last entry: 1960 British Grand Prix

David Ruff Piper (born 2 December 1930) is a British former Formula One and sports car racing driver from England. He participated in 3 Formula One World Championship Grands Prix, debuting on 18 July 1959. In 2001 he won the Le Mans Legend race.

== Racing career ==
=== Early career and Formula One ===
Piper was born in Edgware, Middlesex and began his career in the mid-1950s by competing in sprints and hill-climbs, before beginning circuit racing with a Lotus Eleven. He then moved up to a Lotus 16 which he used in 1959 and 1960 to compete in both Formula One and Formula Two, by means of changing engines as appropriate. His best result with the car was a second place in the Lady Wigram Trophy, in 1960, behind Jack Brabham in a Cooper.

In 1961, Piper competed in European Formula Junior alongside Jo Siffert but drove the Gilby F1 car in the Gold Cup. He also competed in non-championship races in 1962, but had become disenchanted with single-seater racing and moved into sports car racing initially with a Ferrari 250 GTO.

=== Later career ===
Between 1962 and 1970, Piper raced frequently in many locations worldwide using his personally owned Ferraris and, later, a Porsche 917. He was moderately successful and gained a reputation for reliability and consistency.

Piper mainly raced Ferrari, sometimes factory prototypes of which very few were made, but mainly raced and owns GTs and Group 4 sportscars which were made and sold by the dozens, like the Ferrari 250 LM, the Lola T70, and the Porsche 917 which exploited the rules to the maximum when the minimum number was lowered to 25. Porsche decided to build a series of what basically were 4.5 litre flat-12 prototype-like sportscars similar to the 3 litre flat-8 Porsche 908.

When the 917 had is debut at the 1969 1000km Spa, like Le Mans a very fast race track on public roads for which the 917 was made for, Porsche factory drivers preferred the 908 which won several races in a row, and the 917 raced only one lap. Even worse at the 1969 1000km Nürburgring, a bumpy twisty race track in which the factory entered a 917 only once, in 1969, without any of its numerous drivers willing to race the overpowered aerodynamically unstable 917. All factory drivers chose the 908/02 spyder, won the race 1-2-3-4-5 and the 1969 World Sportscar Championship for Porsche. Having spend millions to develop and build two dozens of the 917, the factory needed results to sell them to privateer racers. Porsche hired BMW factory drivers Hubert Hahne and Dieter Quester to practise with the 917, which they did on Friday before BMW vetoed them driving the Porsche. Then, David Piper was contacted; he and his neighbour Frank Gardner were flown in on Saturday, but could not do much on a now wet track. On Sunday, Piper started the 1000km race with the 917. Together with Gardner, finished the race in 8th place, 4 laps behind the winners on the 908.

At the 1969 24 Hours of Le Mans, the factory 917s were very fast and led for most of the race, but did not finish, while the very first 917 customer, John Woolfe, was killed in a lap 1 crash which also eliminated the Ferrari 312 P of Chris Amon. The other 312 P of Scuderia Ferrari was driven by Piper and Pedro Rodriguez, but they did not finish either.

In August, the WSC season ended with the 1000km of Zeltweg in Austria. The factory brought two 917 to be driven by factory drivers, but entered by potential customer teams. Even though chassis 009 of Freiherr von Wendt won the race with Jo Siffert and Kurt Ahrens, the car remained with the factory and was assigned to Gulf-Wyer. Chassis 010 entered by David Piper Racing finished 3rd at the hands of Richard Attwood and Brian Redman and was purchased by Piper who himself drove his Lola T70-Chevy which overheated. In October 1969, at the Japanese Grand Prix, Piper raced his 917 for the first time, supported by Jo Siffert, for a 6th place finish. Back in Europe, Piper finished 3rd at the Hockenheimring, before winning the Kyalami 9 Hours in November, with Attwood.

During the shooting of the film Le Mans on 16 September 1970, Piper crashed a JWA-supplied Porsche 917K and lost part of one leg.

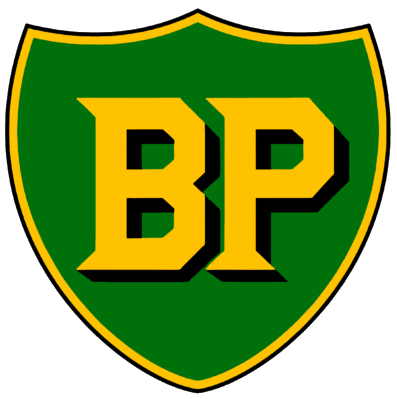
BP logo 1947–1961

The active career of the Porsche 917K in WSC and similar Group 4 races ended with the 1971 season. It still could enter for a few years in Group 7 racing like Can-Am and Interserie, but for that the regular 917 was underpowered as Porsche added turbocharging to the quite different 917/10 TC models. Piper later raced his personal and other cars in historic events.

Piper's personal sport cars of the period are typically painted in bright green, originally from his BP sponsor which replaced Esso after the 1956 Suez Crisis; eventually Piper liked the color and made it his own, having never liked the classic British racing green.

== Racing record ==
=== Complete Formula One World Championship results ===
(key)

Year	Entrant	Chassis	Engine	1	2	3	4	5	6	7	8	9	10	WDC	Points
1959	Dorchester Service Station	Lotus 16 (F2)	Climax 1.5l Straight-4	MON	500	NED	FRA	GBR; Ret	GER	POR	ITA	USA		NC	0
1960	Robert Bodle Ltd.	Lotus 16	Climax 2.5l Straight-4	ARG	MON	500	NED	BEL	FRA; DNS	GBR; 12	POR	ITA	USA	NC	0

=== Complete British Saloon Car Championship results ===
(key) (Races in bold indicate pole position; races in italics indicate fastest lap.)

Year	Team	Car	Class	1	2	3	4	5	6	7	8	9	10	11	12	DC	Pts	Class
1970	Pierre de Plessis	Chevrolet Camaro Z28	D	BRH; DNS	SNE; 7	THR	SIL	CRY; 2†	SIL	SIL	CRO	BRH	OUL	BRH	BRH	31st	8	6th
1978	Ian Bracey	Triumph Dolomite Sprint	C	SIL	OUL	THR	BRH	SIL	DON	MAL; Ret†	BRH	DON	BRH	THR	OUL	NC	0	NC

† Events with 2 races staged for the different classes.

=== 24 Hours of Le Mans results ===
Year	Team	Co-Drivers	Car	Class	Laps	Pos.	Class Pos.
1963	(United States) North American Racing Team	(United States) Masten Gregory	Ferrari 250 GTO/LMB	GT 3.0	312	6th	**3rd**
1964	(United States) North American Racing Team	(Austria) Jochen Rindt	Ferrari 250 LM	P 4.0	0	DNF	DNF
1965	(United Kingdom) Maranello Concessionaires	(Sweden) Jo Bonnier	Ferrari 365 P2	P 5.0	101	DNF	DNF
1966	(United Kingdom) Maranello Concessionaires	(United Kingdom) Richard Attwood	Ferrari 365 P2	P 5.0	33	DNF	DNF
1967	(United Kingdom) JW Automotive Engineering	(United States) Dick Thompson	Mirage M1	P +5.0	59	DNF	DNF
1968	(United Kingdom) David Piper	(United Kingdom) Richard Attwood	Ferrari 250 LM	S 5.0	302	7th	**2nd**
1969	(Italy) SpA Ferrari SEFAC	(Mexico) Pedro Rodriguez	Ferrari 312P Coupé	P 3.0	223	DNF	DNF
1970	(Finland) AAW Racing Team	(Netherlands) Gijs van Lennep	Porsche 917K	S 5.0	112	DNF	DNF

== Gallery ==
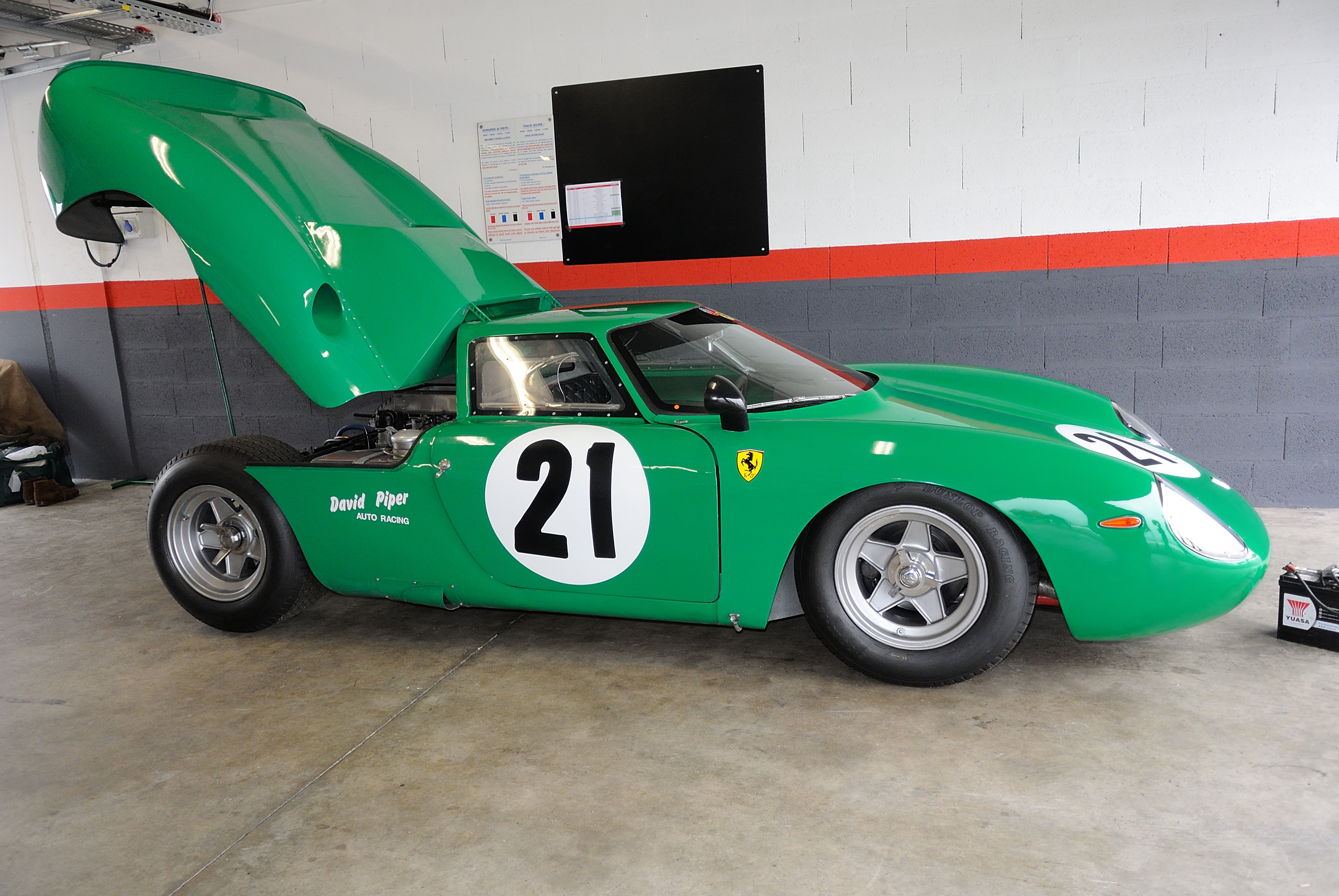
Piper's Ferrari 250 LM s/n 8165

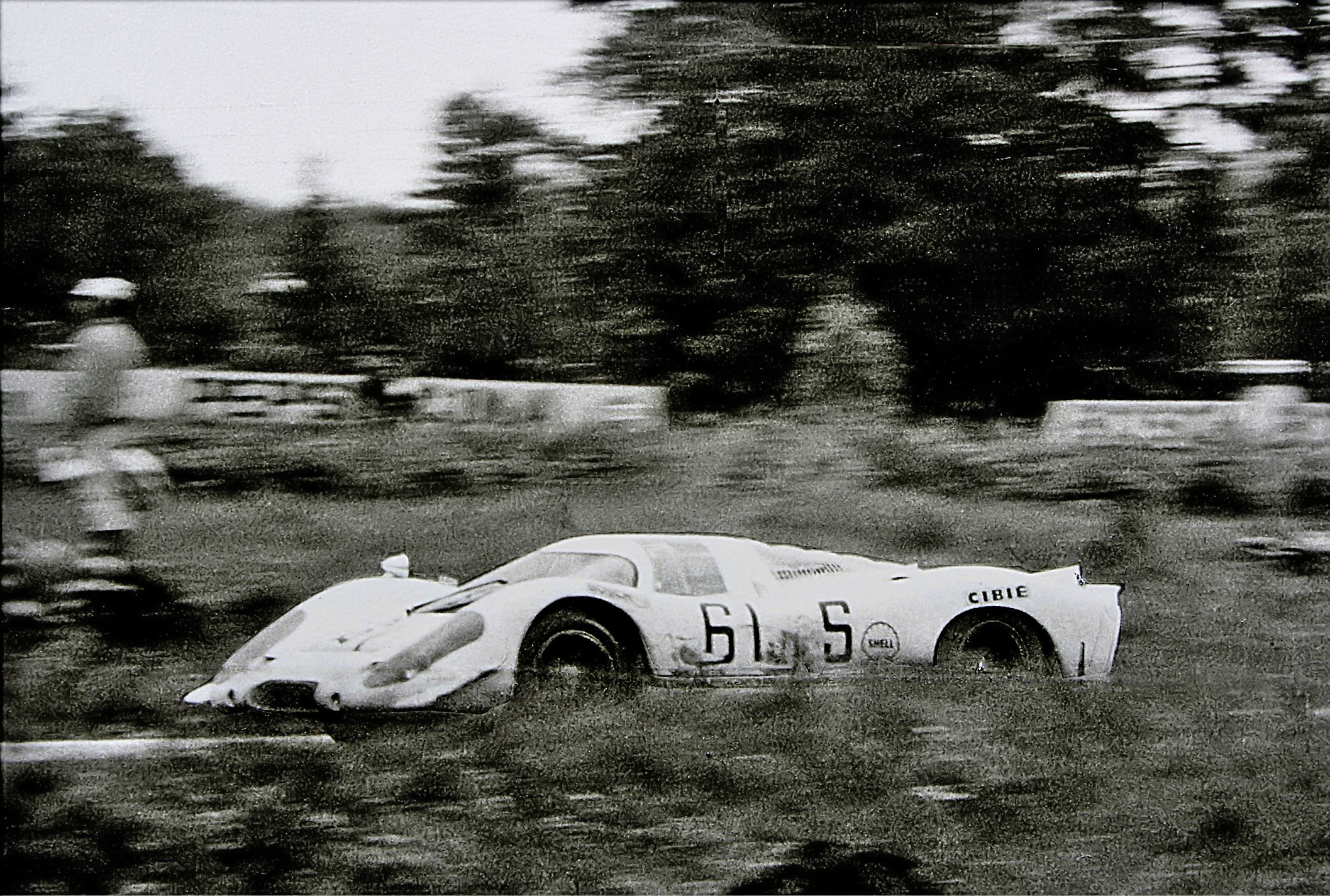
Piper and Frank Gardner in a Porsche 917 at the 1969 ADAC 1000 km Nürburgring

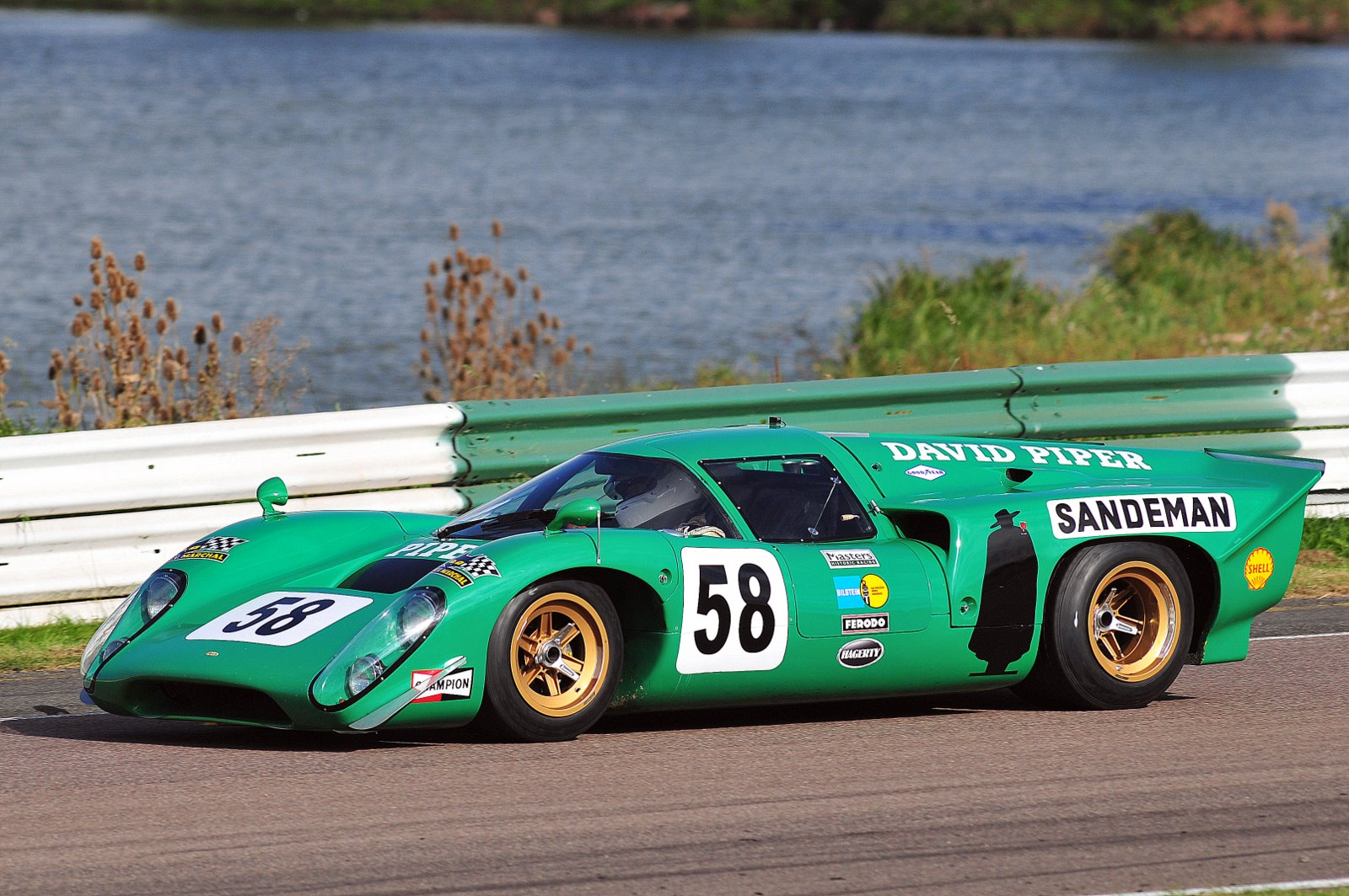
One of Piper's distinctive green cars; a Lola T70 Mk3B at Mallory Park

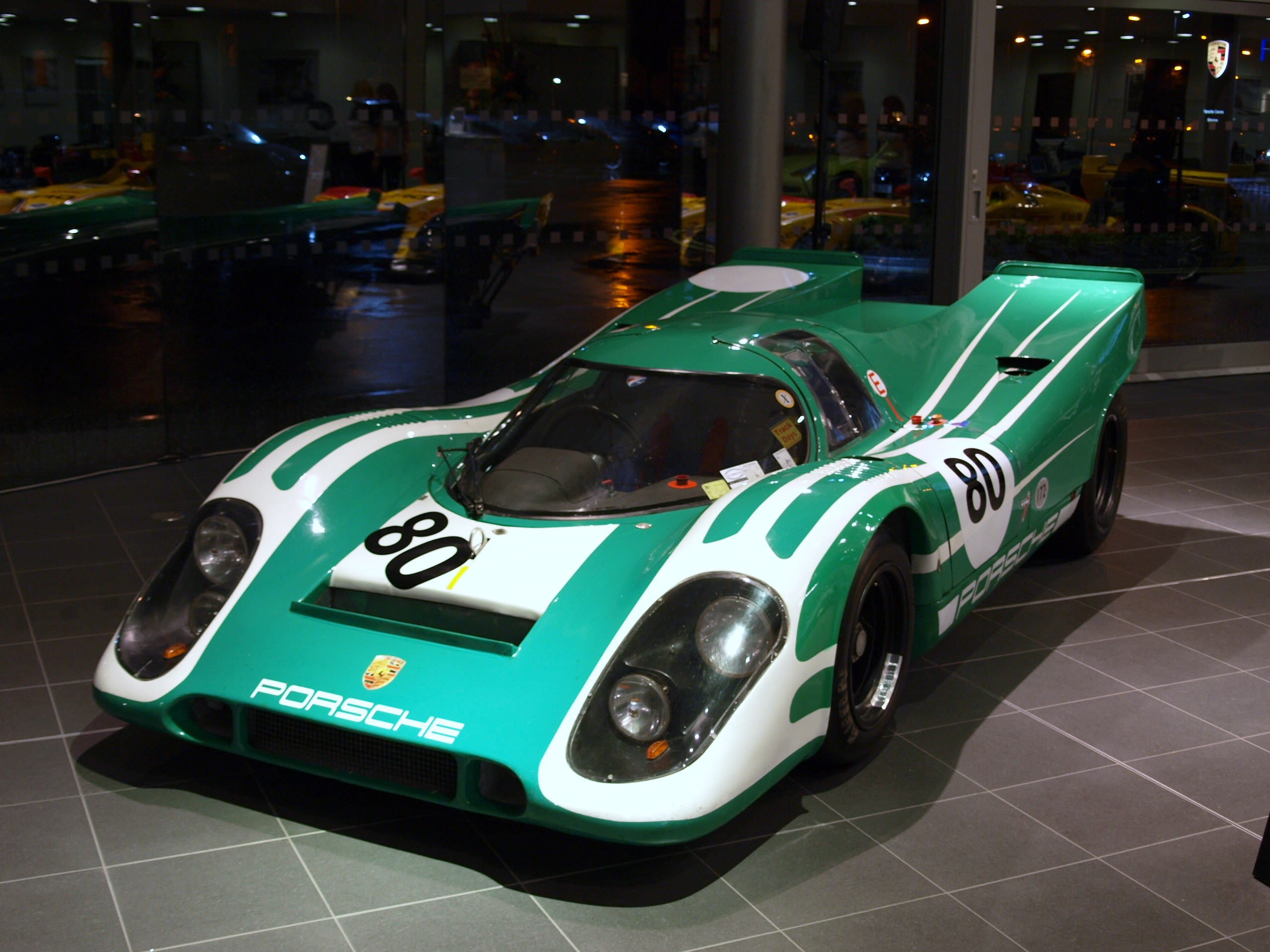
Piper's Porsche 917K copies the white stripes applied to the red Porsche Salzburg car that won the 1970 24

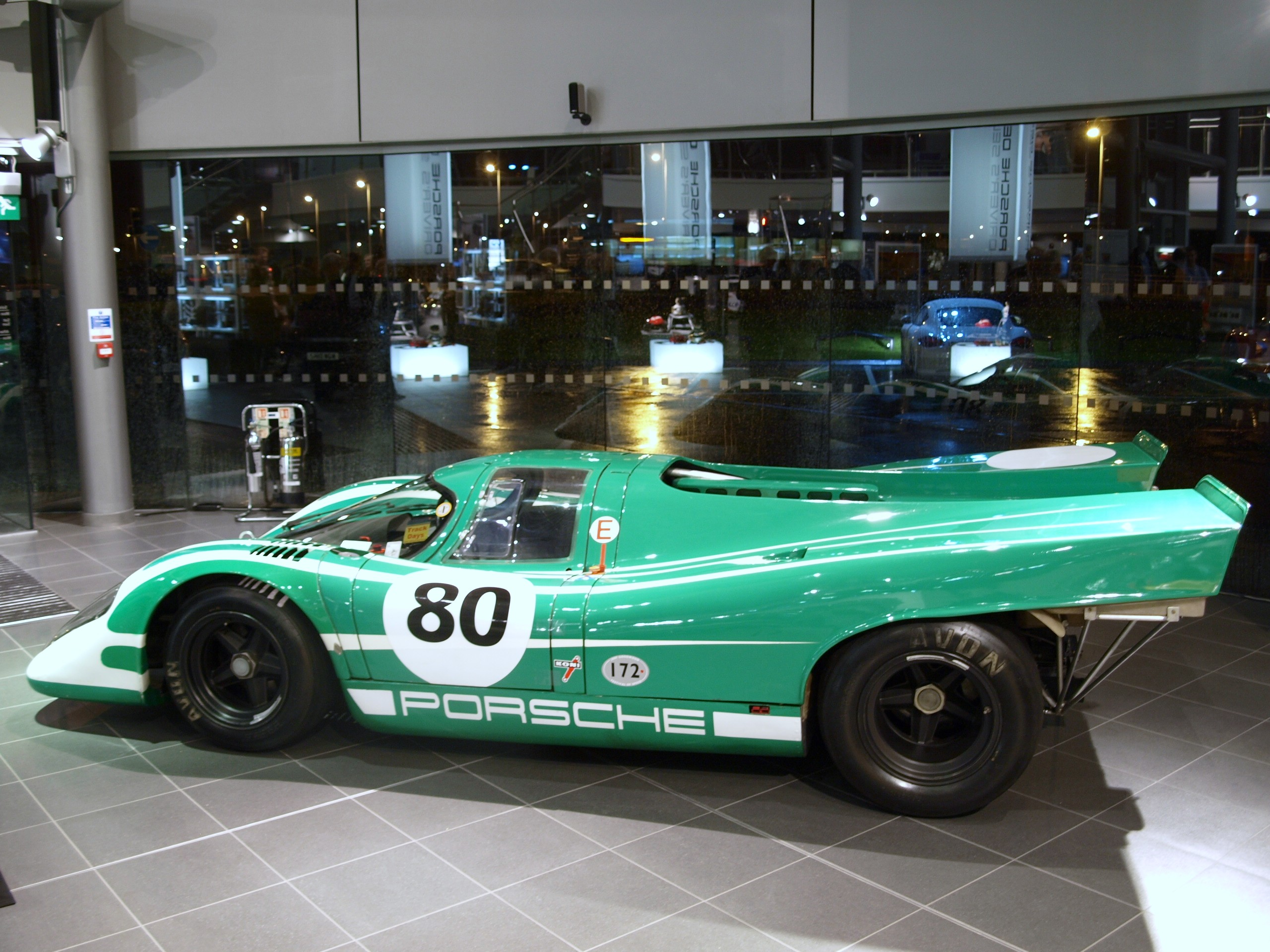
Piper's Porsche 917 Chassis 010 which he has owned from new since the 1969 Zeltweg 1000km
