= Lola T70 =

Sports prototype developed by Lola Cars

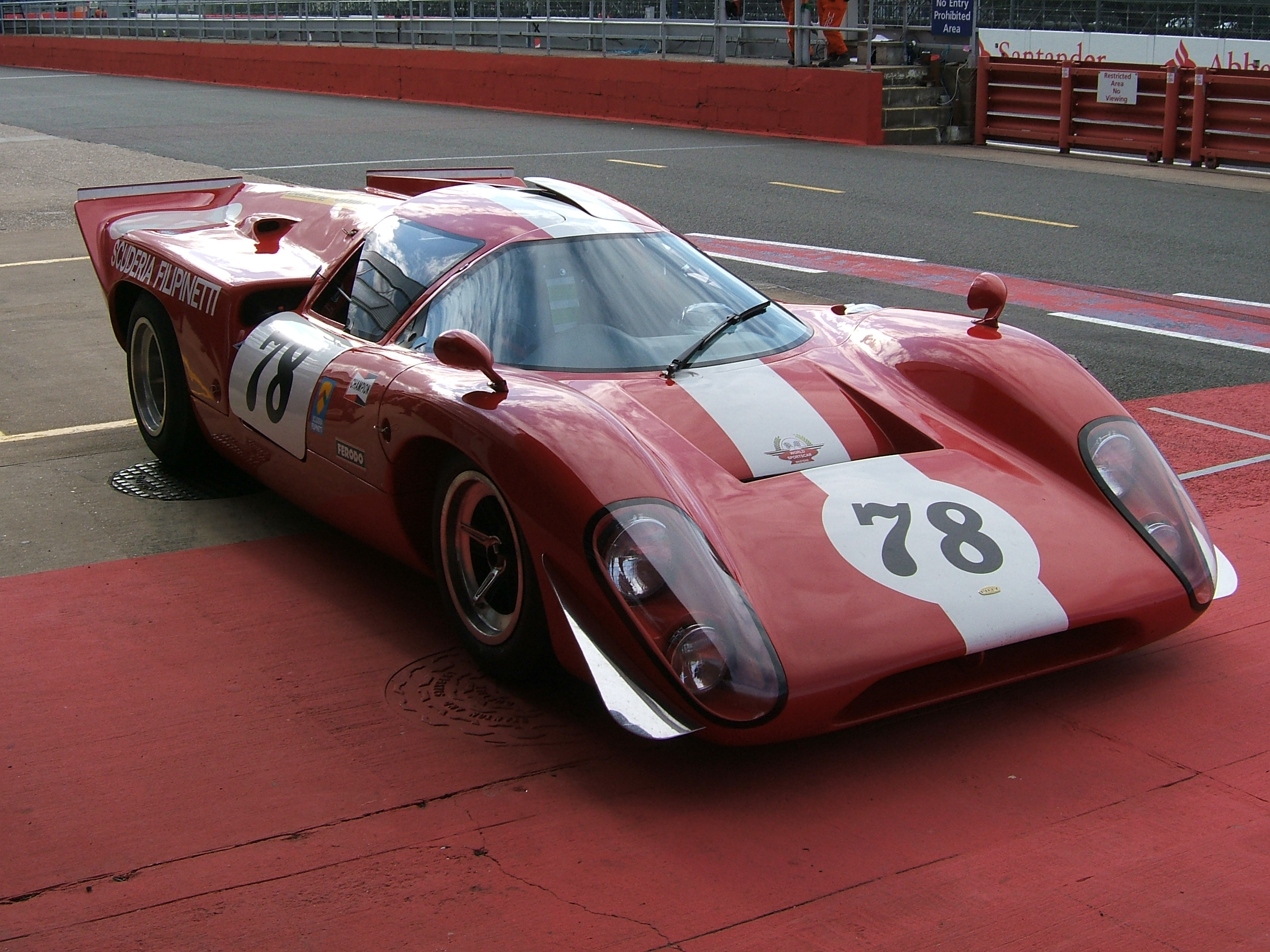
- A Lola T70, in the pits at Silverstone in 2007
- Category: Group 4, Group 7
- Designer: Eric Broadley
- Predecessor: Lola Mk6
- Successor: Lola T160 (Can-Am)

Technical specifications
- Suspension (front): Double wishbone
- Suspension (rear): Double wishbone
- Transmission: Hewland LG500 4 speed manual, Hewland LG600 4/5 speed manual (later)
- Brakes: Girling disc brakes

Competition history
Wins	Podiums	Poles
232	348	91

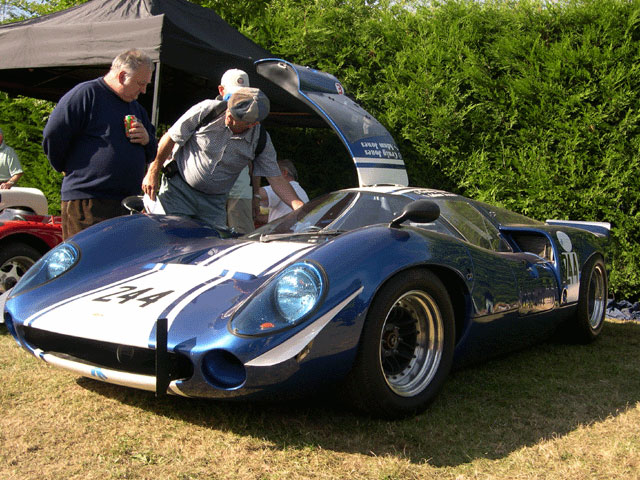
Lola T70 Mk3, in 2005

The Lola T70 is a sports prototype developed by British manufacturer Lola Cars in 1965, the successor to its Mk6. Lola built the aluminium monocoque chassis, which were typically powered by large American V8s.

The T70 was quite popular in the mid to late 1960s, with more than 100 examples being built in three versions: an open-roofed MK I, MK II and MK III spyder, followed by a Mk III coupé, and finally a slightly updated Mk IIIB. The T70 was replaced in the Can-Am series by the lighter Lola T160.

== History ==
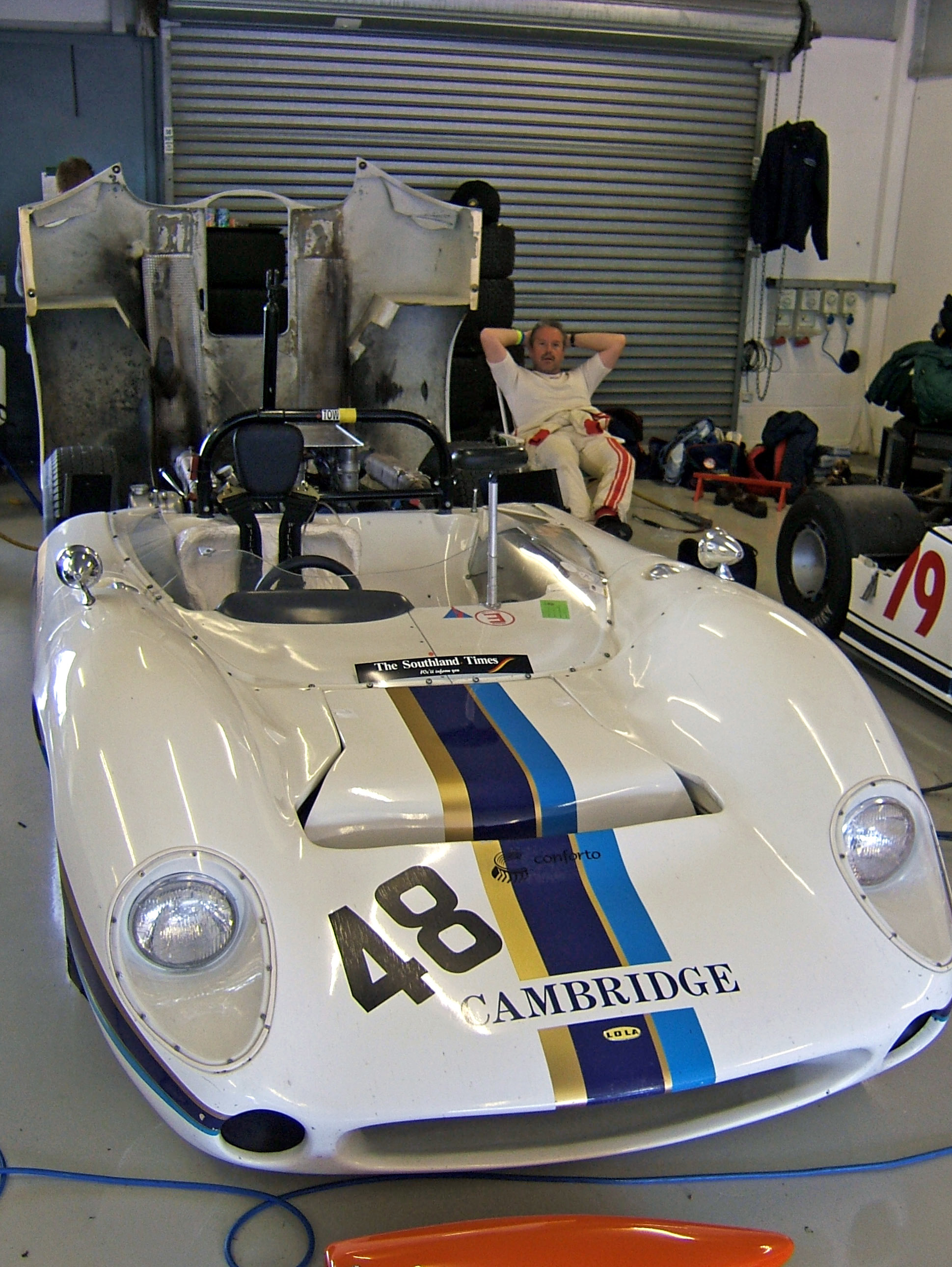
The T70 was first produced in an open-top MKII "spyder" configuration, seen here at Silverstone in 2007.

Early success for the Lola T70 came when Walt Hansgen won the Monterey Grand Prix, at Laguna Seca Raceway, on 17 October 1965, driving John Mecom's Lola T70-Ford.

In 1966, the hot setup for the Can-Am was a T70 Chevrolet, winning five of six races during the year. John Surtees was the champion and Dan Gurney drove the only Ford powered car ever to win a Can-Am race. In 1967, no one could compete with the new McLaren M6.

When the FIA changed the rules for sports car racing for the 1968 season, limiting engine size of prototypes to three litres, sportscars with up to five litre engines were allowed if at least fifty were made. This homologation rule allowed the popular yet outdated Ford GT40 and Lola T70s to continue racing. The Fords won Le Mans again in 1968 and 1969, while the T70's only big endurance win was a one–two finish in the 1969 24 Hours of Daytona when the Sunoco Lola T70-Chevrolet of Mark Donohue and Chuck Parsons bested the Traco-built small-block 302 cu in Chevy V8 powered American International Racing T70s of Ed Leslie and Lothar Motschenbacher. When the minimum number was lowered to twenty-five for 1969, the more modern Porsche 917 and Ferrari 512 were homologated and outran the older Lolas and Fords.

Chevrolet powered coupes tended to not run as well in Europe as they did in North America. Some reliability problems arose when racing in Europe, mainly due to the grade of fuel allowed. When forced to run on commercially available "pump fuel", with a lower octane rating than the "Avgas" permitted under American rules, engine failures related to detonation became an issue. In modern historic racing, these engines show spectacular reliability due to parts unavailable in the 1960s and better fuel quality than the historically poor petrol supplied by the ACO.

An Aston Martin powered coupe was entered by Lola for Le Mans in 1967. Even with drivers such as John Surtees, it was a disaster. The Aston Martin V8 engine failed after short runs, attributed to inadequate developmental funds.

During the filming of Steve McQueen's Le Mans, Lola chassis were disguised as the Porsche 917 and Ferrari 512s that crashed in the film. It is claimed chassis T76/141 originally campaigned by Ulf Norinder and Jo Bonnier was used for the wrecked Gulf Porsche. A T70 coupe also appears as a car of the future in George Lucas' 1971 feature THX 1138, his first commercial film.

A T70 Mk. IIIB driven by Mike D’Udy was used to set a South African land speed record, with a two-way average of 191.80 MPH and one-way best of 195.96 MPH, on 13 January 1968. The required runs were made on a section of the R45 between Vredenburg and Hopefield in the Western Cape province, and were completed despite an early mechanical failure in which the car's fifth gear was irreparably damaged. This record would stand until November 1988, when a new two-way average of 224.30 MPH was set by an Audi 5000CS driven by Sarel van der Merwe with official backing from Volkswagen South Africa.

In 2005, Lola Cars announced a revival of the T70 MkIIIb in "an authentic and limited continuation series" of the original racer. Seven were produced before Lola Cars went defunct in 2012.

== Replicas ==
A UK company, Gardner Douglas, produces the T70 Spyder with styling inspired by the Lola car, and using a tubular spaceframe chassis with GRP panelling.

Another British company, Broadley Automotive, makes T70 Mk3B replicas using original moulds and drawings. So authentic they have been granted FIA Historic Technical Passports (HTPs), a number of these Broadley T76s can be seen racing in the FIA Masters Historic Sportscar Championship, where they regularly compete alongside original T70s, Ferrari 512s and Porsche 917s for outright victories.

A US company, Race Car Replicas, produces an authentic looking replica of both the MkII and MkIIIB T70 using an aluminium monocoque chassis.

A South African company, Universal Products, produces a tubular spaceframe-chassis version, clad in aluminium, of the T70 MkIIIB.

Swiss car manufacturer Sbarro produced 13 T70 MKIII replicas.
