= Ferrari 250 GTO =

Car model

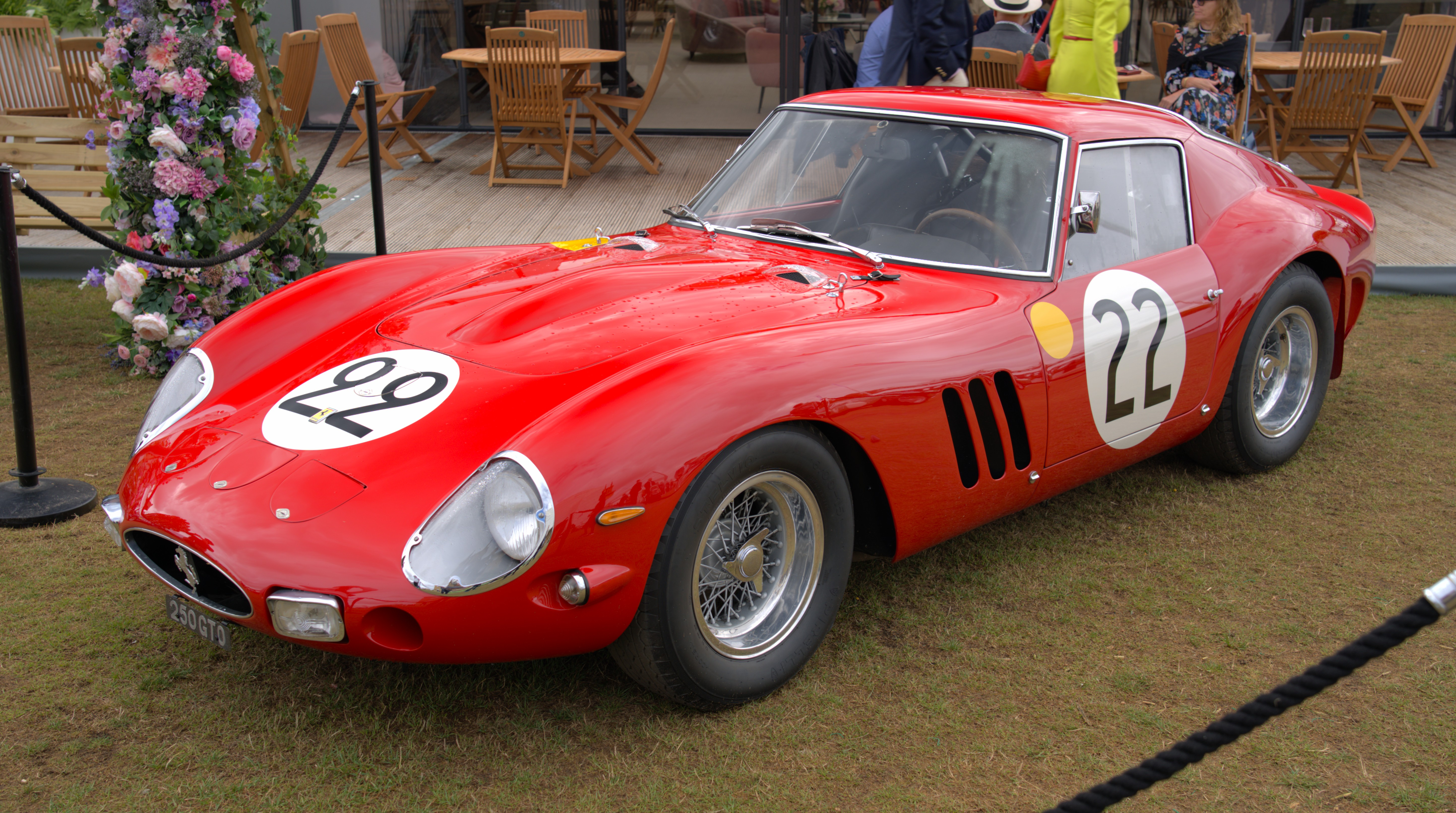
- 1962 Ferrari 250 GTO (chassis 3757GT)

Overview
- Manufacturer: Ferrari
- Production: 1962–1964 (36 produced)
- Designer: Giotto Bizzarrini; Sergio Scaglietti

Body and chassis
- Class: Sports car
- Body style: 2-door berlinetta
- Layout: FR layout
- Related: 330 LMB; 250 LM

Powertrain
- Engine: 2,953 cc; Tipo 168 Comp/62 60º V12; SOHC 2 valves per cylinder valvetrain configuration; 6 Weber 38 DCN carburetors; Compression ratio 9.7:1
- Power output: 300 PS (296 hp; 221 kW) at 7500 rpm; 294 N⋅m; 217 lbf⋅ft (30 kg⋅m) at 5500 rpm
- Transmission: 5-speed manual

Dimensions
- Wheelbase: 2,400 mm (94.5 in)
- Length: 4,325 mm (170.3 in)
- Width: 1,600 mm (63.0 in)
- Height: 1,210 mm (47.6 in)
- Curb weight: 880–950 kg (1,940–2,094 lb)

Chronology
- Predecessor: Ferrari 250 GT SWB
- Successor: Ferrari 250 LM; Ferrari 288 GTO

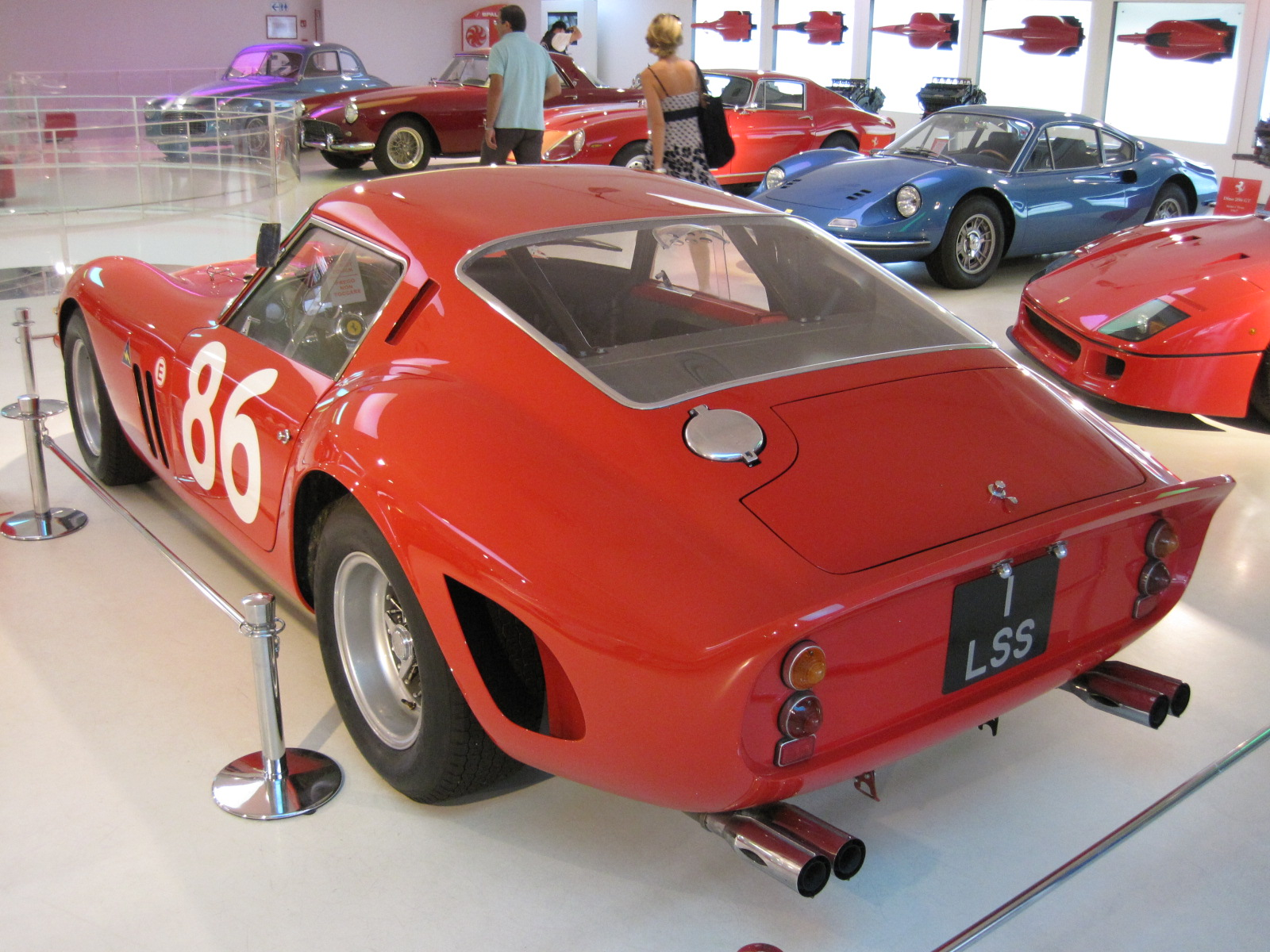
Rear view of 1962 Ferrari 250 GTO (chassis 3451GT)

The Ferrari 250 GTO is a V12 front engine grand tourer produced by Ferrari from 1962 to 1964 for homologation into the FIA's Group 3 Grand Touring Car category that required at least 100 made within 12 months, including 250 GT SWB that had been homologated in June 1960.

The "GTO", which stands for Gran Turismo Omologato, Italian for "Grand Touring Homologated", was powered by Ferrari's Tipo 168/62 Colombo V12 engine with 250 cubic centimeters displacement of each of its cylinders, thus 3 liter in total.

As Ferrari had convinced the rule makers of FIA/CSI (and the Le Mans ACO) to count in earlier 250 GT SWB cars, just 36 GTOs were manufactured between 1962 and 1964. This includes 33 cars with 1962–63 bodywork (Series I) and three with 1964 (Series II) bodywork similar to the Ferrari 250 LM. Four of the older 1962–1963 (Series I) cars were updated in 1964 with Series II bodies.

When new, the 250 GTO cost $18,000 in the United States, with buyers personally approved by Enzo Ferrari and his dealer for North America, Luigi Chinetti. This model has become highly desired by collectors and sales have repeatedly set price records. The current record for world's most expensive Ferrari was set in June 2018 when a 1963 250 GTO (chassis 4153GT) was sold in a private sale for $70 million.

In 2004, Sports Car International placed the 250 GTO eighth on their list of Top Sports Cars of the 1960s, and nominated it the top sports car of all time. Similarly, Motor Trend Classic placed the 250 GTO first on a list of the "Greatest Ferraris of All Time". Popular Mechanics named it the "Hottest Car of All Time".

== Design and development ==
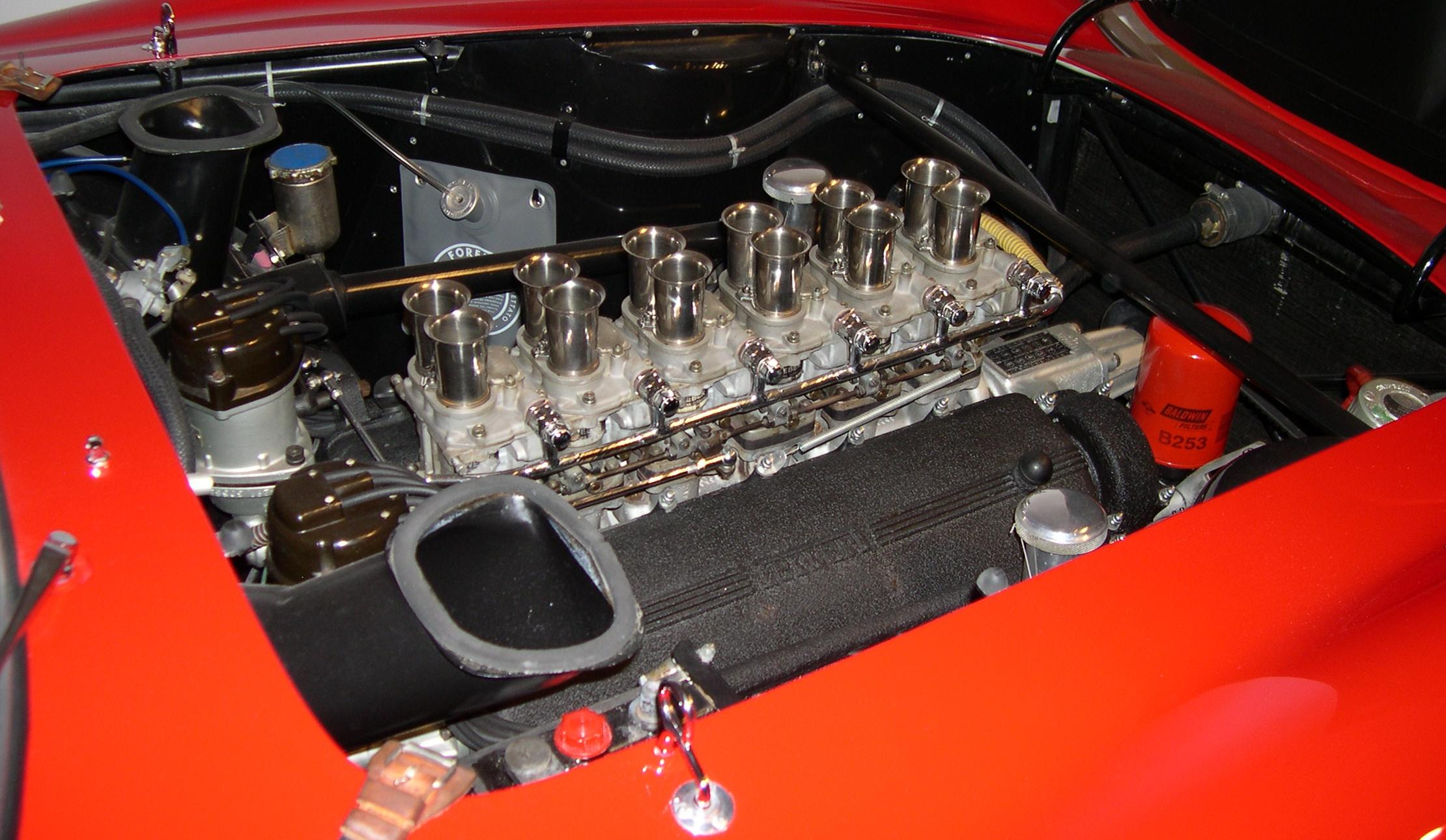
Tipo 168/62 Colombo V12 engine

The 250 GTO was designed to compete in Group 3 GT racing, where its rivals would include the Shelby Cobra, Jaguar E-Type and Aston Martin DP214. The development of the 250 GTO was headed by chief engineer Giotto Bizzarrini. Although Bizzarrini is usually credited as the designer of the 250 GTO, he and most other Ferrari engineers were fired in 1962 due to a dispute with Enzo Ferrari. Further development of the 250 GTO was overseen by new engineer Mauro Forghieri, who worked with Scaglietti to continue development of the body. The design of the car was a collaborative effort and cannot be ascribed to a single person.

The mechanical aspects of the 250 GTO were relatively conservative at the time of its introduction, using engine and chassis components that were proven in earlier competition cars. The chassis of the car was based on that of the 250 GT SWB, with minor differences in frame structure and geometry to reduce weight, stiffen and lower the chassis. The car was built around a hand-welded oval tube frame, incorporating A-arm front suspension, rear live-axle with Watt's linkage, disc brakes, and Borrani wire wheels. The engine was the race-proven Tipo 168/62 Comp. 3.0 L (2,953 cc) V12 as used in the 250 Testa Rossa Le Mans winner. An all-alloy design utilizing a dry sump and six 38DCN Weber carburetors, it produced approximately 300 PS (296 bhp; 221 kW) at 7500 rpm and 294 N⋅m; 217 lbf⋅ft (30 kg⋅m) at 5500 rpm of torque. The gearbox was a new 5-speed unit with Porsche-type synchromesh.

Bizzarrini focused his design effort on the car's aerodynamics in an attempt to improve top speed and stability. The body design was informed by wind tunnel testing at Pisa University as well as road and track testing with several prototypes. The resulting all-aluminium bodywork had a long, low nose, small radiator inlet, and distinctive air intakes on the nose with removable covers. Early testing resulted in the addition of a rear spoiler. The underside of the car was covered by a belly pan and had an additional spoiler underneath formed by the fuel tank cover. The aerodynamic design of the 250 GTO was a major technical innovation compared to previous Ferrari GT cars, and in line with contemporary developments by manufacturers such as Lotus. The bodies were constructed by Scaglietti, with the exception of early prototypes with bodies constructed in-house by Ferrari or by Pininfarina (in the case of s/n 2643 GT). Cars were produced in many colours, with the most famous being the bright red "Rosso Cina".

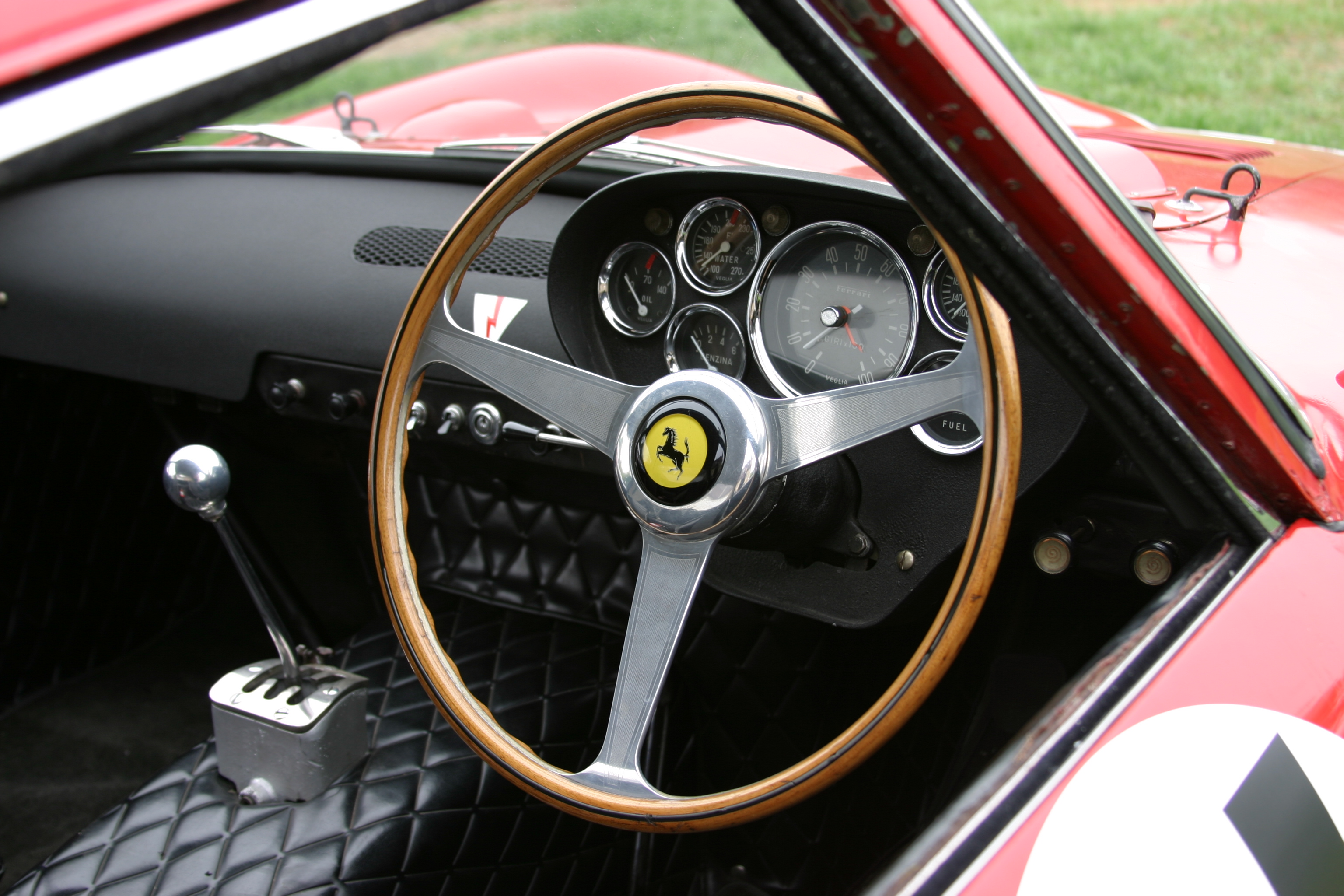
Interior of 250 GTO (chassis 3647GT)

The minimalist interior of a 250 GTO reflects the car's racing intentions. There is no speedometer, seats are cloth-upholstered, and neither carpeting nor a headliner was installed. Cockpit ventilation is via exterior air inlets. The exposed metal gate defining the shift pattern became a Ferrari tradition maintained in production models until replaced by steering column-mounted paddle shifters in the 2000s.

=== Prototypes ===
As the 250 GTO was heavily derived from the earlier 250 GT Berlinetta SWB, Ferrari engineers constructed two 250 GTO prototypes in 1961 by converting existing chassis of this type.

The first prototype, designated in official photos as the 1961 Ferrari 250 GT Le Mans Berlinetta Sperimentale, was constructed from chassis 2643GT, originally a 1961 250 GT SWB. It was built to competition specification, which included a reinforced chassis, a competition gearbox and a Tipo 168/61 3.0 L engine tuned to 300 bhp, equipped with dry sump lubrication and six Weber 38 DCN carburetors. Pininfarina constructed a new lightweight aluminium alloy body for this prototype, which resembled that of the 400 Super America coupe. 2643GT was entered by Scuderia Ferrari in the 1961 24 hours of Le Mans, driven by Fernand Tavano and Giancarlo Baghetti. Although they were running as high as 8th overall, they were forced to retire at 4:45 am on Sunday morning due to engine failure. During the course of the race, Ferrari engineers gathered information about the performance of the car which was used to modify and improve it, including the addition of a rear spoiler. During the Le Mans race, 2643GT suffered from high-speed instability, possibly due to the front end design. Following Le Mans, 2643GT returned to the factory, where it was used for more testing. The prototype raced again at the 1962 Daytona Continental 3 hours, where it placed 4th overall and 1st in the GT class driven by Stirling Moss. Subsequently, it was sold to N.A.R.T. and a succession of private owners.

The second prototype was also constructed from a donor car, although sources disagree on the chassis number and type. Several older sources mention the donor as a 1960 250 GT SWB, chassis 2053GT. Alternatively, other sources have claimed that a 250 GT Boano (0523GT) or a 1959 250 GT SWB (1791GT) was used as the donor car. This prototype was created entirely by the Ferrari factory's racing department under the oversight of Giotto Bizzarrini, including the bodywork. The original chassis was extensively modified, including relocation of the engine mounts lower and further back in the frame. A competition-specification engine was fitted, including six Weber 38 DCN carburetors. The bodywork seen on the second prototype in period photos was rough, unfinished aluminium. The body's ungainly appearance lead the Ferrari team to nickname it "Il Mostro" (the Monster) and the press to call it "The Anteater". Hammer marks, weld beads and bolted or riveted panels could be seen throughout, evidence of the continual modifications performed during factory testing in 1961. Although the body was crudely formed, it displayed features that would be seen in the production 250 GTO, including the overall profile of a low hood and high rear, triple front air intakes, engine bay cooling slots in the front fenders and plexiglass-covered headlights. The interior was hastily constructed and even more minimal than in the production 250 GTO, with scattered instrumentation and a bare aluminium dashboard.

The second prototype was tested at Monza in September 1961 by Stirling Moss. Results were promising, as the prototype was able to lap the circuit faster than a 250 GT SWB. However, the high speed stability issues seen during testing of the first prototype remained. Shortly after this test, construction of the first production 250 GTOs began in late 1961 with chassis 3223GT and 3387GT.

As the prototype was no longer needed for testing, the experimental body was scrapped. Regardless of the identity of the chassis, sources are in agreement that the second GTO prototype was either partially or entirely scrapped and is no longer extant in its 1961 form. If 2053GT was indeed the chassis, it was then given a 250 GT SWB style body and sold to Jacques Swaters. 2053GT crashed during the 1962 Nürburgring 1000 km and was then rebodied by Carrozzeria Sports Cars. Subsequently, 2053GT was totally destroyed in an accident at the 1964 Spa 500km.

1961 250 GTO Prototype #2 "The Anteater"
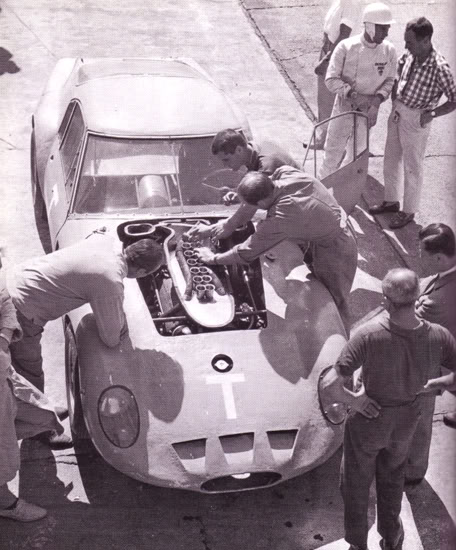
The second 250 GTO prototype during testing at Monza in 1961

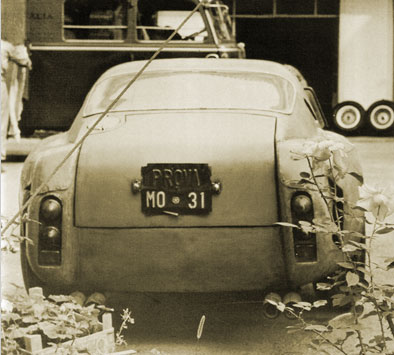
Rear view of 250 GTO prototype

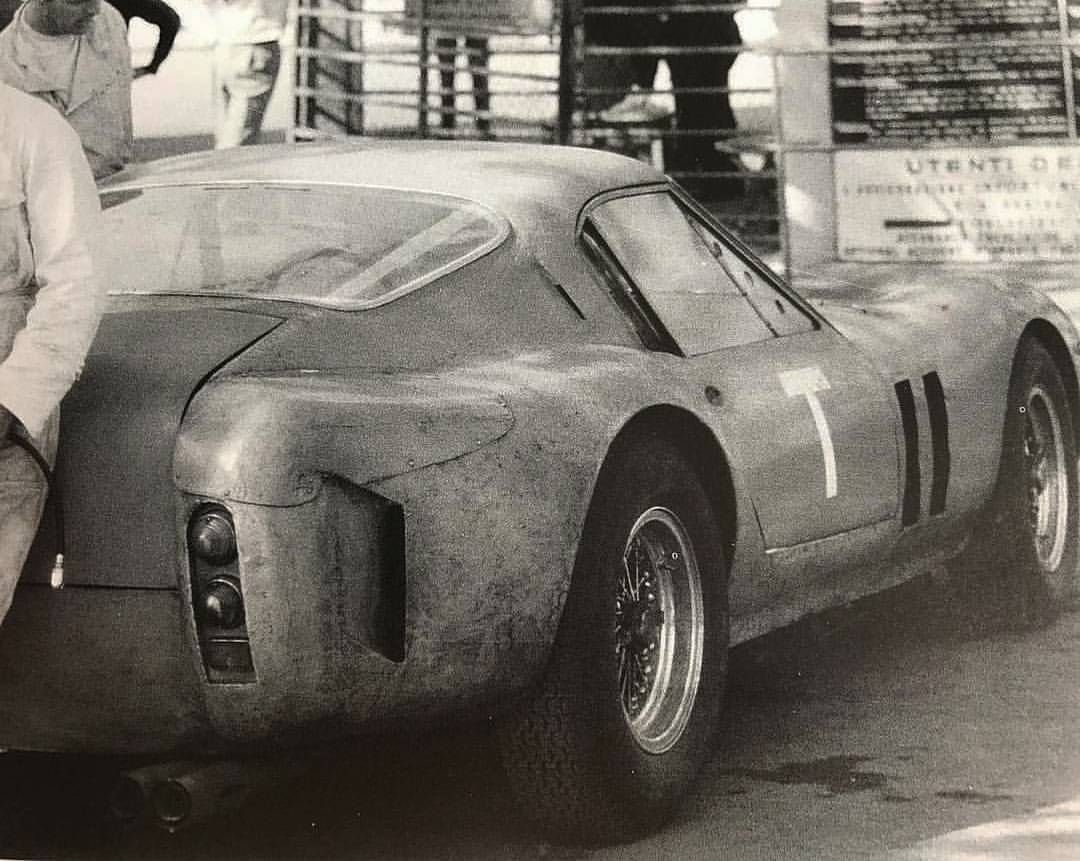
Note cooling vents in rear of front wing which would also be used in the production 250 GTO.

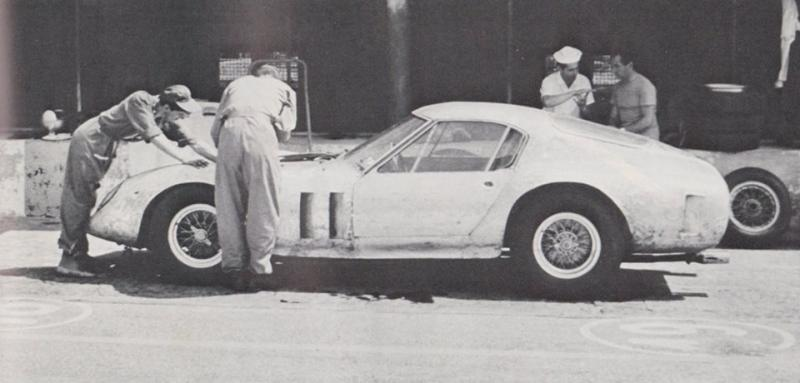
The low front profile shows the eventual shape of the production 250 GTO, while the rear still resembles a 250 GT SWB.

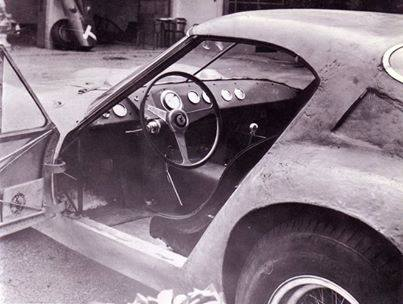
Prototype interior with extensive instrumentation in an unfinished aluminium dashboard

=== Variants and related models ===
Handbuild production, updates, and repairs throughout each car's competition history result in differences both visible and invisible between individual 250 GTOs. Variance in air intake/vent configuration is common among cars. Modifications to the original bodywork were performed by the factory, Scaglietti, or other body shops, usually after crashes or according to a racing team's wishes.

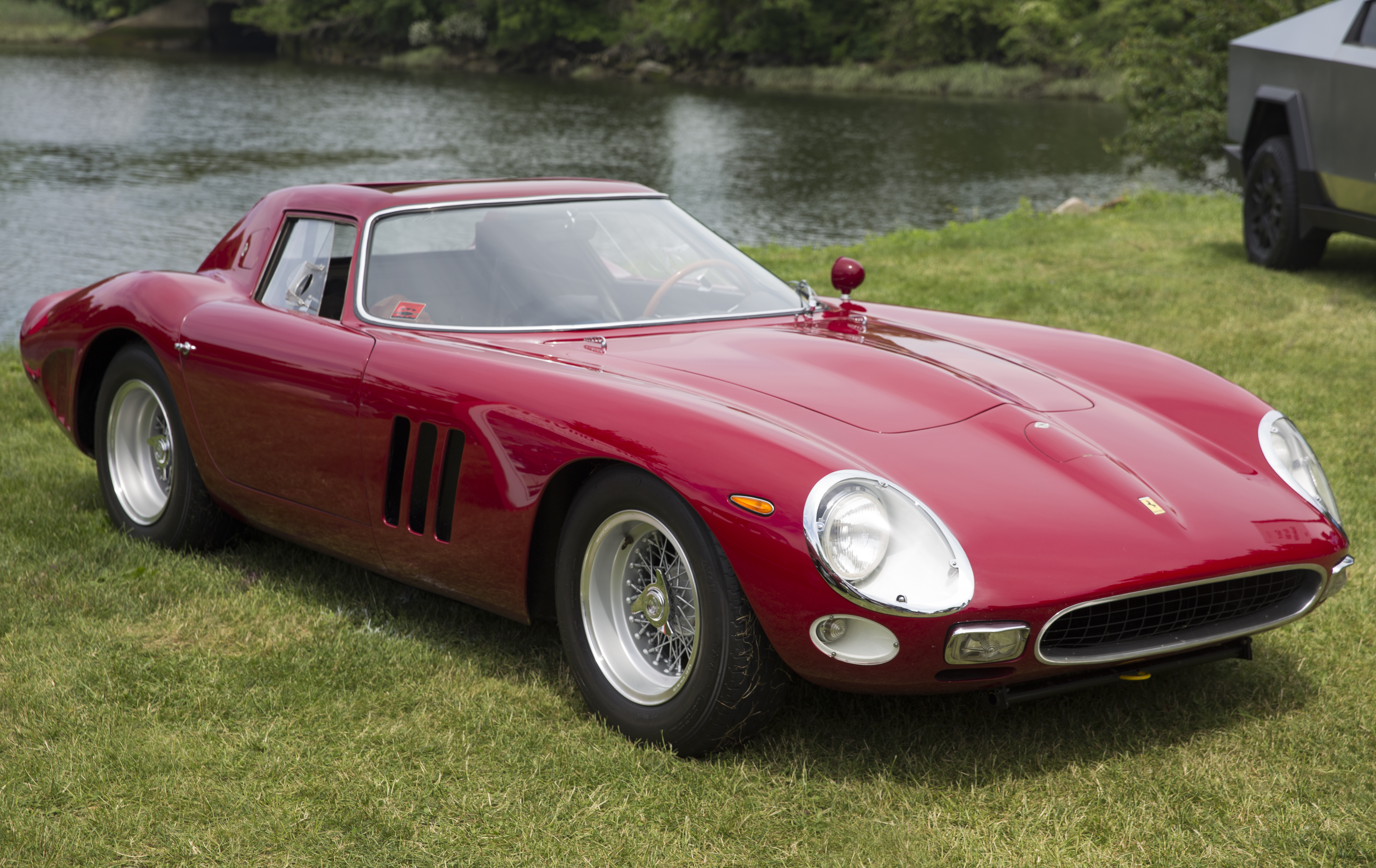
1962/1964 250 GTO (chassis 4091GT), rebodied with the Series II bodywork by the factory

In 1964, Ferrari tasked Mauro Forghieri and Mike Parkes with redesigning the 250 GTO's bodywork, resulting in what became known as the GTO '64 (or Series II). Three new cars were produced to the 1964 specification, and four earlier 250 GTOs were retrofitted to it by the factory. This redesign was intended to maintain the GTO's competitiveness for one more year, as the FIA decided to not approve the 250 LM for GT-class racing during the 1964 season. The Ferrari engineers incorporated many of the 250LM's aerodynamic features into the 1964 GTO. This resulted in a visual similarity between the two models, even though the GTO does not share the 250LM's mid engine rear wheel drive layout. The factory also made minor modifications to the engine, gearbox, chassis, suspension and interior. Despite these changes, the overall performance improvement was slight. The GTO '64 still saw some racing success with factory and privateer teams, including an overall win at Daytona in 1964 by Phil Hill and Pedro Rodriguez driving for NART.

Three 330 GTO specials were made using the 250 GTO chassis and body fitted with 400 Superamerica 4.0-liter motors. Distinguished by a larger bonnet bulge, these cars were used briefly for racing and testing by Scuderia Ferrari before being sold to private customers. Some sources include these cars in the total number of 250 GTOs produced, increasing that number from 36 to 39.

The 330 LMB is sometimes considered a GTO variant. These cars used a 4.0-liter 330 motor and a modified 250 GT Lusso chassis/body. Four were produced in 1963.

Three 275 GTB/C Speciales were built in 1964/65. Despite their origins as competition versions of the 275 GTB, they are sometimes considered developments of the 250 GTO due to similarity of configuration and bodywork.

The Ferrari 250 GT SWB Breadvan was a one-off racing car designed for Scuderia Serenissima by Bizzarrini after his departure from Ferrari. It was developed specifically to compete against the then-new 250 GTO. Although based on the earlier 250 GT Berlinetta SWB, the Breadvan provided an opportunity for Bizzarrini to develop the ideas he had first explored with the GTO, such as lower and more aerodynamic bodywork, incorporation of a dry sump, and radical lightening of the entire car.

== Racing ==
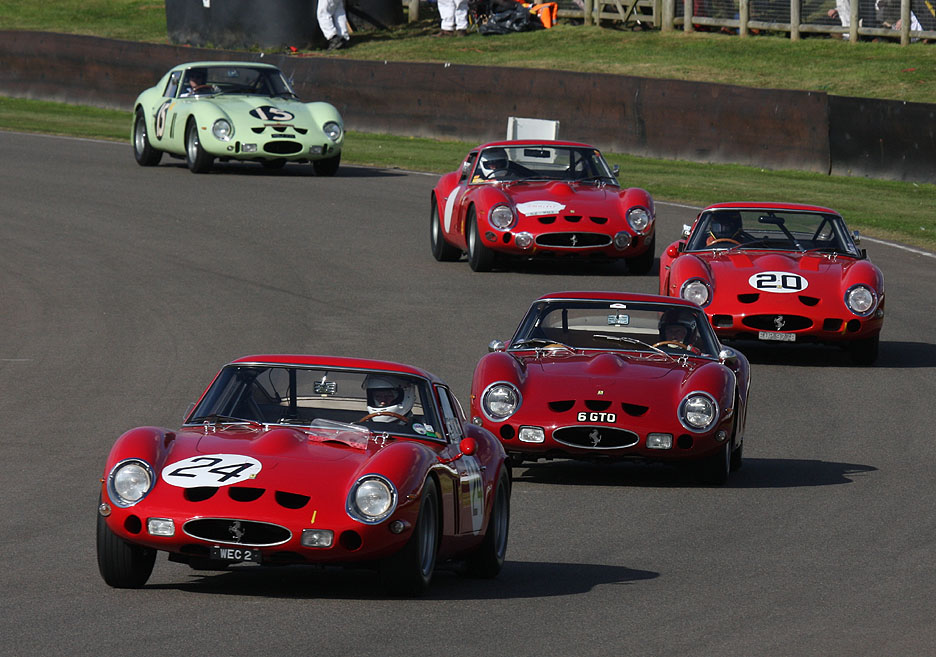
Four 250 GTOs and one 330 GTO (second to last car) at the 2012 Goodwood Revival

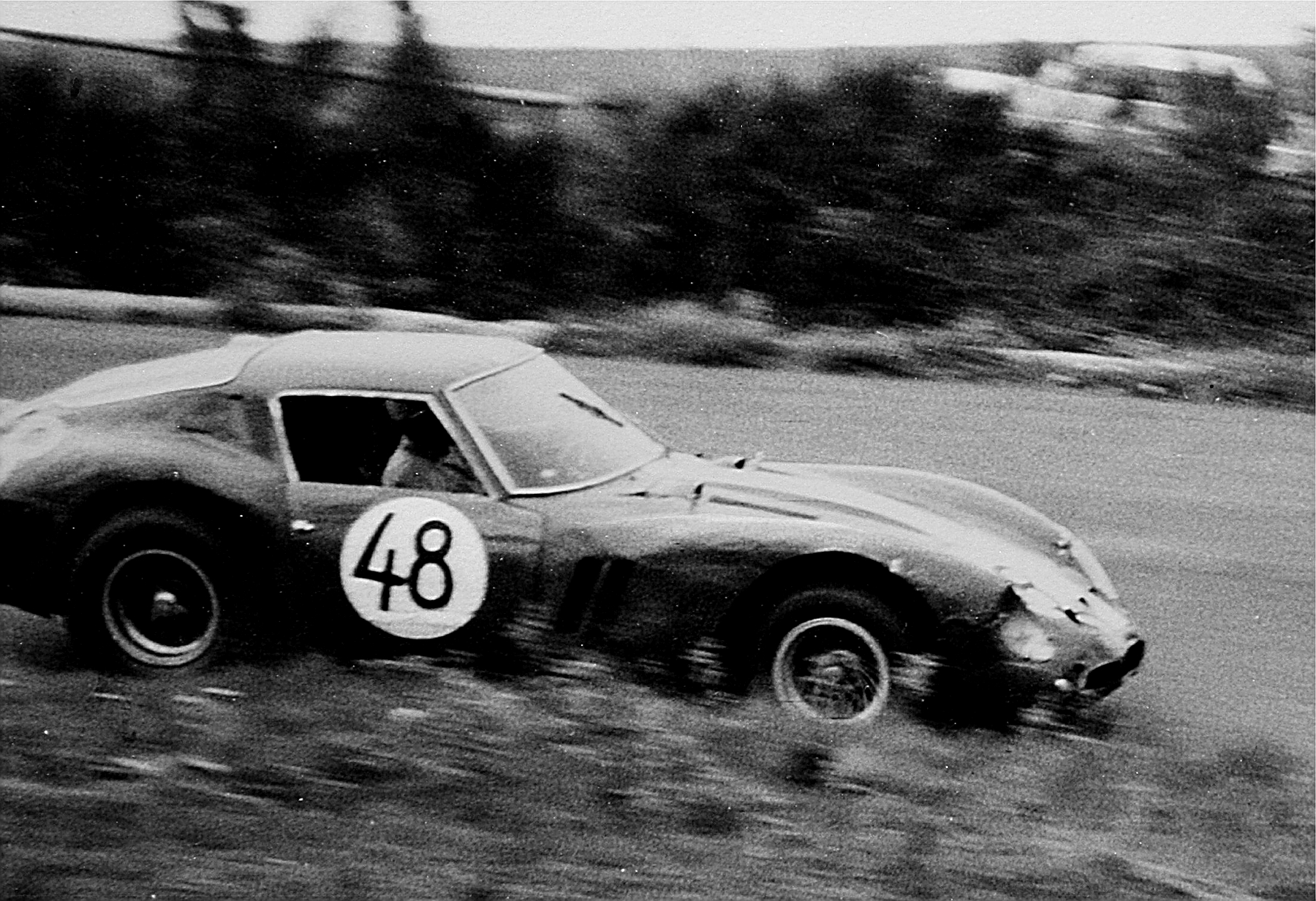
250 GTO (chassis 3809GT) driven by Kalman von Czazy and Karl Foitek during the 1963 1000km Nürburgring

The 250 GTO's racing debut was at the 1962 12 Hours of Sebring, driven by American Phil Hill (the Formula One World Driving Champion at the time) and Belgian Olivier Gendebien. Although originally annoyed that they were driving a GT-class car instead of one of the full-race 250 Testa Rossas competing in the prototype class, the experienced pair impressed themselves (and everyone else) by finishing second overall behind the Testa Rossa of Bonnier and Scarfiotti.

Ferrari would go on to win the over 2000cc class of the FIA's International Championship for GT Manufacturers in 1962, 1963, and 1964, the 250 GTO being raced in each of those years. 250 GTOs also won the 1963 and 1964 Tour de France Automobile, marking Ferrari's nine year dominance of that race.

During the 1962-1964 racing seasons, only a few other GT-class models were consistently competitive with the 250 GTO. These were the Jaguar E-type, Aston Martin DB4 GT Zagato, DP212, DP214, and DP215, and the AC Cobras. In addition to official Scuderia Ferrari entries, many 250 GTOs were also raced by independent racing teams and private drivers. During this time it was therefore common for 250 GTO drivers to compete against other 250 GTOs. The 250 GTO was one of the last front-engined cars to remain competitive at the top level of sports car racing.

The 250 GTO gradually passed into obsolescence following the 1964 season. Scuderia Ferrari withdrew the 250 GTO from its racing activity by 1965, leaving only a few independent teams and private owners to campaign it in endurance races, rallies and hillclimbs. By 1967, the 250 GTO was almost entirely absent from international racing, with only a few rally and hillclimb results during that year. Prior to the development of the 250 GTO collector market and associated vintage racing and show events, some of the surviving 250 GTOs were used in regional races, while others were used as road cars.

=== Homologation ===
FIA regulations in 1962 required at least one hundred examples of a car to be built in order for it to be homologated for Group 3 Grand Touring Car racing. Ferrari built only 36 250 GTOs (33 of the 1962-design Series I cars and three 1964-design Series II cars, with revised bodywork). The additional three "330 GTO" cars with the four-litre 330 engine —recognizable by the large hump on the bonnet— are sometimes included in the overall production number, bringing the total to 39. It became a popular myth that when FIA inspectors showed up to confirm that 100 examples had been built, Enzo Ferrari shuffled the same cars between different locations, thus giving the impression that the full complement of 100 cars was present. In reality, no deception was required, as the production of the 250 GTO was covered by the homologation of the earlier 250 GT Berlinetta SWB model. These homologation papers were issued in 1960, but extensions were applied for and accepted multiple times between 1961 and 1964, allowing Ferrari to add modifications not covered under the original specification, including changes to the engine, transmission, and suspension. Additionally, since more than 100 bodies had been built according to the earlier 250 GT SWB specification, FIA regulations allowed a new body to be designed, leading to the development of the new 250 GTO body style. This method of homologation was not unique to Ferrari, as similar methods were used to homologate the Aston Martin DB4 GT Zagato and the Jaguar E-Type Lightweight.

== Collectibility ==
While the GTO is now arguably the most valuable collector car in the world, it was merely a no-frills used race car in the late 1960s and very early 1970s. Many of the vehicles were offered at or acquired for four-figure (USD) sums. In contrast, restored Duesenberg Model Js often sold for about $50,000 around 1970.

From the late 1970s to the late 1980s, classic car values rose rapidly and the 250 GTO became the most valuable Ferrari model, touted as the Ferrari that most completely embodies the characteristics of the manufacturer. Prices fell substantially during the car market crash of the early 1990s, resulting in lows of $2,700,000 in September 1994 and $2,500,000 in May 1996. Prices began to climb again in the late 90s and have continued to rise through the present day. 250 GTOs have repeatedly broken records for most expensive car ever sold at auction or private sale. The current record for world's most expensive Ferrari was set in June 2018 when a 1963 250 GTO (chassis 4153GT) was sold to David MacNeil in a private sale for $70 million. On 25 August 2018, RM Sotheby's sold Greg Whitten's 250 GTO 3413GT at their Monterey auction. The final price inclusive of buyer's fee was $48,405,000, representing a new record for most expensive car ever sold at auction. The previous record was also held by a 250 GTO, 3851GT, which was sold at the Bonhams Quail Lodge auction in 2014.

Scarcity and high prices led to the creation of several replica 250 GTOs on more common Ferrari chassis. Misrepresentations of the original cars, offered for sale at full market value, have been reported.

=== Price history ===
Scatter plot of Ferrari 250 GTO price history, 1962–2018 View source data.

Ferrari 250 GTO Price History, 1962-2018
Year	Price (USD)	Sold or advertised at this price	Chassis Number (if known)	Notes
1962	18,500	Sold		Selling price from factory when new
1965	4,000	Sold	3851GT	Purchased from Ernesto Prinoth by Fabrizio Violati.
1965	10,500	Sold		
1966	7,000	Sold	3647GT	Purchased by James McNeil from Robert Sauers in Springfield, Massachusetts.
1968	6,500	Advertised		15 June, a 1962 example was advertised in Autoweek.
1969	2,500	Sold	3223GT	Sold at Kruse International auction. The lowest documented price a GTO ever changed hands for, well below the $6k to $8.5k market price of the time.
1969	5,400	Sold	3387GT	Purchased by Kirk F. White of Pennsylvania, USA.
1970	8,500	Advertised	4757GT	Advertised in the LA Times.
1970	7,780	Advertised		Advertised in Road & Track by Tom Meade of Modena, Italy. The 1962 GTO was one of several Ferraris offered by Meade in the ad.
1971	9,500	Advertised		Advertised by Algar Ferrari in Autoweek
1971	9,900	Advertised		Advertised in Road & Track
1971	6,000	Sold	3589GT	The car was auctioned by Victoria High School in Texas, US. It had been donated to the school seven years prior.
1971	12,000	Advertised		Advertised by KFW Motorcars in Paoli, Pennsylvania, US.
1973	17,500	Sold		
1974	28,000	Sold		
1975	13,000	Sold	3387GT	Purchased by Stephen Griswold of Berkeley, California, US. Well under market at the time, even for an unrestored car.
1975	35,000	Advertised	3223GT	Car was being offered by Stan Nowak between February and April 1975.
1975	48,000	Advertised		Advertised in Autoweek.
1977	71,000	Sold	3757GT	Purchased by Pink Floyd drummer Nick Mason for £35,000, circa November 1977, with proceeds from the album The Dark Side Of The Moon.
1978	90,000	Sold	3987GT	Car in good original condition. Sale occurred circa August 1978, said to be the last known sub-$100k sale.
1978	125,000	Sold	3387GT	Purchased by Mark De Friece. Car in perfect Concours-ready condition.
1980	190,000	Advertised	3445GT	Asking price following restoration.
1981	285,000	Advertised	4091GT	Advertised in various publications.
1982	345,000	Sold	4757GT	Purchased by Christopher Murray of Rhode Island, US. Price quoted as either $250,000 or $345,000.
1983	300,000	Sold		
1984	500,000	Sold		
1985	650,000	Sold	3987GT	Purchased by Ralph Lauren.
1986	1,000,000	Sold	3589GT	
1987	1,600,000	Sold	4757GT	Sold at FBI Auction and subsequently entered collection of Jacques Swaters.
1988	4,200,000	Sold	3589GT	Purchased by Engelbert Stieger of Teufen, Switzerland
1989	10,000,000	Sold		
1989	13,300,000	Sold	3909GT	Sold to Takeo Kato of Japan.
1990	13,000,000	Sold		
1993	3,250,000	Sold	4219GT	
1994	3,500,000	Sold	3909GT	Sold to David Morisson of London, UK
1996	3,500,000	Sold	5095GT	Sold to Lee Kun-hee of Seoul, South Korea.
1996	3,500,000	Advertised	3445GT	Advertised by SMC of La Jolla, California, US.
1997	2,200,000	Sold		
1998	6,000,000	Sold	3729GT	
2000	7,000,000	Sold	3413GT	Purchased by Greg Whitten.
2004	10,600,000	Sold	3223GT	
2007	22,000,000	Sold	5095GT	Sold to William Ainscough of the UK.
2008	22,763,611	Sold	5095GT	Sold to Jon Hunt of London, UK.
2010	26,000,000	Sold	3943GT	
2010	17,700,000	Sold	4675GT	Purchased by BBC Radio 2 DJ Chris Evans. Sale price includes value of cars given in trade, quoted as 17 to 17.7 million USD total value.
2012	31,700,000	Sold	5095GT	Believed to be the largest single car transaction in the UK at the time.
2012	35,000,000	Sold	3505GT	Sold to Craig McCaw of Washington, USA in a private sale.
2013	52,000,000	Sold	5111GT	Sold to an unknown buyer by Paul Pappalardo in a private sale.
2014	38,115,000	Sold	3851GT	Sold by the Fabrizio Violati estate at Bonham's 2014 Quail Lodge auction in Carmel, California, USA.
2016	56,800,000	Advertised	3387GT	Advertised by Talacrest UK.
2017	44,000,000	Sold	3387GT	Sold by Bernard Carl in private sale to Gregor Fisken.
2018	48,405,000	Sold	3413GT	Sold by Greg Whitten in 2018 at RM Sotheby's in Monterey, California, US.
2023	51,705,000	Sold	3765LM	Sold via RM Sotheby's New York on 13 Nov 2023. A special website has been created.
2026	38,500,000	Sold	3729GT	Bianco Speciale sold via Mecum Auctions Florida on 17 January 2026 to collector David Lee. A special website was created.

== Chassis numbers ==
Chassis No.	Build Date	Driveside	Factory Colour	Current Location	Comments
2053GT	2 August 1960	LHD	Grey with brown stripe then Rosso Cina	Unknown	Prototype of the GTO tested by Stirling Moss in Monza. Badly damaged in the 1962 Nürburgring 1000 km, later rebodied by Carrozzeria Sports Cars. Destroyed during the 1964 Spa 500km
3223GT	19 June 1962 (Developed from 1961)	LHD	Red/blue	Joseph Barone, USA	First GTO, used for testing and press by the Ferrari factory. First private owner was William McKelvy, who purchased it from Luigi Chinetti Motors in July 1962 for $18,500.
3387GT	16 March 1962	LHD	Blue metallic with central stripe	François Perrodo; London, England	Originally shipped to Luigi Chinetti Motors Inc., NY for Phil Hill. Driven by Glenn Roberts at the 1962 24 Hours of Le Mans. Restored by Joe Macari, London in 2019. As of 2019, this chassis was involved in a legal dispute regarding the possession of its original gearbox. As of 2021, chassis 3387GT resides in the private collection of oil executive and amateur racing driver Francois Perrodo.
3413GT	30 April 1962	LHD	Rosso Cina/Blue	Harry Yeaggy; Cincinnati, OH	First sold to Edoardo Lualdi-Gabardi, who raced it extensively in hillclimbs during the early 1960s. Rebodied by the factory in series II/GTO '64 style during 1964. Sold by RM Sotheby's 26/Aug/18 at Monterey for $48.4M
3445GT	30 April 1962	LHD	Red/Blue	Christopher Cox; Chapel Hill, NC, USA	First sold to Luciano Conti of Bologna. Raced by Scuderia Serenissima during the early 1960s.
3451GT	20 April 1962	LHD	Maroon/white roof	Lawrence Stroll; Montreal, Canada	Purchased November 1996 via Duncan Hamilton.
3505GT	20 April 1962	RHD	Pale green	Michael J. Cantanucci Saratoga Springs, NY, USA	Originally shipped to UK for use by Stirling Moss
3527GT	22 May 1962	LHD	Rosso Cina	Dr. Richard E. Workman; Windermere, Florida, USA	Built for Gotfrid Koechert. Sold by dealer Tom Hartley in mid-2019 for Irvine Laidlaw Video of 3527GT history and sale
3589GT	20 April 1962	RHD	Blu scuro/Rosso	Christoph Stieger; Teufen, CH	Originally shipped to Tommy Sopwith's Equipe Endeavour, Brighton, UK via Maranello Concessionaires Ltd. Video of 3589 history and restoration
3607GT	6 June 1962	LHD	Rosso Cina/Blue	S. Robson Walton; Bentonville, AR, USA	Originally sold to Ferdinando Pagliarini.
3647GT	6 June 1962	RHD	Rosso Cina	Chris MacAllister; Indianapolis, IN, USA	Originally shipped to Col. Ronnie Hoare of Bowmaker, UK, raced initially by John Surtees for Col. Hoare's Maranello Concessionaires team. Owned by James McNeil since 1966. The only 250 GTO to remain unrestored.
3705GT	14 June 1962	LHD	Rosso Cina/Blue	Ed Davies; Coral Gables, Florida, USA	Came second at the 1962 24 Hours of Le Mans, driven by Jean Guichet/Pierre Noblet
3729GT	28 July 1962	RHD	Bianco	David Lee; Los Angeles, California	Originally shipped to John Coombs in the UK. Nicknamed Bianco Speciale as it was the only example to leave the factory painted white. 1960's competition history including Graham Hill, Mike Parkes, and Roy Salvadori
3757GT	20 April 1962	LHD	Red/Blue	Nick Mason; London, England	Originally shipped to Jacques Swaters Ecurie Francorchamps racing team. Came third at the 1962 24 Heures du Mans.
3765LM	1 May 1962	LHD	Rosso Cina	Luc Poirier Montreal, Canada	4L Sefac car. Raced Nürburgring 1000 km and 24 heures du Mans in 1962. James Jaeger sold by auction 13 November 2023
3767GT	26 July 1962	RHD	BP green	Anthony Bamford; Oakamoor, England	Originally shipped to David Piper in the UK.
3769GT	13 June 1962	LHD	Grey metallic with blue central stripe	Anthony Wang; Long Island, NY, USA	Originally shipped to Fernand Tavano for the 1962 24 Heures du Mans, DNF.
3809GT	9 July 1962	LHD	Rosso Cina	Ernesto Bertarelli, Swiss	Originally shipped to Kalman von Czazy in Switzerland
3851GT	11 September 1962	LHD	Rosso Cina	Carlos Monteverde, UK	Badly damaged twice
3869GT	8 October 1962	RHD	Rosso Cina	Giorgio Perfetti, Swiss	Raced by Ron Fry in 1963, 1964
3909GT	10 September 1962	LHD	Rosso Cina	John McCaw, USA	Raced by Jo Siffert at 500 Km Spa 1963
3943GT	16 October 1962	LHD	Rosso Cina	Charles E. Nearburg, USA	Class Winner 1000km Nürburgring 1963
3987GT	11 October 1962	LHD	Rosso Cina	Ralph Lauren, USA	Winner over all at 1000 Km Paris 1962 with Rodriguez
4091GT	17 November 1962	LHD	Grigio metallic	Peter G. Sachs, USA	Class winner at Targa Florio 1965 with Clemente Ravetto
4115GT	7 December 1962	LHD	Silver metallic	Paul Vestey, England	The only GTO deliver new in Germany
4153GT	2 June 1963	LHD	Silver metallic	David MacNeil, USA	Winner over all at Tour de France 1964
4219GT	5 February 1963	LHD	Rosso Cina	Brandon Wang, England	Delivered new to a young American heiress Mamie Spears Reynolds in 1963. Raced by Rodriguez in period
4293GT	22 April 1963	LHD	Rosso Cina	Chip Connor, USA	Class Winner 24 heures du Mans 1963
4399GT	29 May 1963	RHD	Rosso Cina	Anthony Bamford, England	Raced the 24 heures du Mans 1964
4491GT	7 June 1963	RHD	BP Green	Johann Anton Rupert, South Africa	Car rebodied many times
4561SA	23 September 1963	RHD	Rosso Cina	Carlo Vögele, Swiss	4 Liter customer car
4675GT	23 May 1963	LHD	Rosso Cina	Claudio Roddaro, Monaco	Deliver new to Pasquale Annunziata in Roma. The car raced the Tour de France 1963 with Guido Fossati and the Targa Florio 1964 with Jean Guichet. Later raced by Luigi Taramazzo from Bordighera. Sold in 2024 to Claudio Roddaro.
4713GT	5 June 1963	LHD	Rosso Cina	Lulu Wang, USA	The only GTO with a 330 LMB body style
4757GT	5 June 1963	LHD	Rosso Cina	Tom Price, USA	The car raced the 24 heures du Mans 1963
5095GT	6 September 1963	LHD	Rosso Cina	National Museum of Qatar	2nd overall at the Tour de France 1963
5111GT	6 September 1963	LHD	Rosso Cina	Unknown	Originally shipped to Jean Guichet in France.

== Racing results ==
(key)

Year	Entrants	Chassis	Class	1	2	3	4	5	6	7	8	9	10	11	12	13	14	15
1962	—			DAY (United States)	SEB (United States)	TGA (Italy)	NÜR (Germany)	LMS (France)	CHA (France)	GWD (United Kingdom)	BRI (United States)	PAR (France)						
1962	(United States) Scuderia Bear	3223GT									3							
1962	(United States) Scuderia Bear	3223GT	GT +2.0								2							
1962	(United States) N.A.R.T.	3387GT			2			6			2							
1962	(United States) N.A.R.T.	3387GT	GT +2.0		1						1							
1962	(United States) N.A.R.T.	3987GT										1						
1962	(United States) N.A.R.T.	3987GT	GT +2.0									1						
1962	(Italy) Scuderia Serenissima	3445GT						Ret	1			Ret						
1962	(Italy) Scuderia Serenissima	3445GT	GT +2.0					Ret	1			Ret						
1962	(Italy) 'Montin'	3451GT				4	Ret											
1962	(Italy) 'Montin'	3451GT	GT +2.0			1	Ret											
1962	(United Kingdom) U.D.T. Laystall	3505GT						Ret		1								
1962	(United Kingdom) U.D.T. Laystall	3505GT	GT +2.0					Ret		1								
1962	(Belgium) Écurie Francorchamps	3527GT										5						
1962	(Belgium) Écurie Francorchamps	3527GT	GT +2.0									5						
1962	(Belgium) Écurie Francorchamps	3757GT						3				DSQ						
1962	(Belgium) Écurie Francorchamps	3757GT	GT +2.0					2				DSQ						
1962	(United Kingdom) Equipe Endeavour	3589GT								3								
1962	(United Kingdom) Equipe Endeavour	3589GT	GT +2.0							3								
1962	(United Kingdom) Maranello Concessionaires	3647GT								Ret		2						
1962	(United Kingdom) Maranello Concessionaires	3647GT	GT +2.0							Ret		2						
1962	(France) Jean Guichet	3705GT						2	4									
1962	(France) Jean Guichet	3705GT	GT +2.0					1	3									
1962	(United Kingdom) John Coombs	3729GT								2								
1962	(United Kingdom) John Coombs	3729GT	GT +2.0							2								
1962	(United Kingdom) David Piper	3767GT								4								
1962	(United Kingdom) David Piper	3767GT	GT +2.0							4								
1962	(France) Fernand Tavano	3769GT						Ret										
1962	(France) Fernand Tavano	3769GT	GT +2.0					Ret										
1962	(Italy) S.E.F.A.C.	3765LM					2	Ret										
1962	(Austria) Ö.A.S.C.	3809GT					Ret											
1962	(Austria) Ö.A.S.C.	3809GT	GT +2.0				Ret											
1962	(Hungary) Kalman von Czazy	3809GT										Ret						
1962	(Hungary) Kalman von Czazy	3809GT	GT +2.0									Ret						
1962	(Switzerland) Scuderia Filipinetti	3909GT										Ret						
1962	(Switzerland) Scuderia Filipinetti	3909GT	GT +2.0									Ret						
1962	(Belgium) Pierre Noblet	3943GT										4						
1962	(Belgium) Pierre Noblet	3943GT	GT +2.0									4						
1963	—			DAY (United States)	SEB (United States)	TGA (Italy)	SPA (Belgium)	NÜR (Germany)	CON (Italy)	LMS (France)	WIE (Germany)	CHA (France)	FRE (Germany)	GWD (United Kingdom)	VIL (Switzerland)	MON (Italy)	FRA (France)	BRI (United States)
1963	(United States) Scuderia Bear	3223GT		15	18													10
1963	(United States) Scuderia Bear	3223GT	GT +2.0	7	11													7
1963	(United States) Mike Gammino	3387GT																DNS
1963	(United States) Mike Gammino	3387GT	GT +2.0															DNS
1963	(Italy) Scuderia Sant'Ambroeus	3413GT				4												
1963	(Italy) Scuderia Sant'Ambroeus	3413GT	GT +2.0			1												
1963	(Sweden) Ulf Norinder	3445GT														7		
1963	(Sweden) Ulf Norinder	3445GT	GT +2.0													7		
1963	(Italy) Scuderia Serenissima	3445GT			5	6												
1963	(Italy) Scuderia Serenissima	3445GT	GT +2.0		2	2												
1963	(Italy) Scuderia Serenissima	4757GT								Ret		3	11		5		Ret	
1963	(Italy) Scuderia Serenissima	4757GT	GT +2.0							Ret		1	1		1		Ret	
1963	(Italy) Scuderia Serenissima	5095GT															2	
1963	(Italy) Scuderia Serenissima	5095GT	GT +2.0														2	
1963	(Italy) Vincenzo Zanini	3451GT														Ret		
1963	(Italy) Vincenzo Zanini	3451GT	GT +2.0													Ret		
1963	(Switzerland) Armand Boller	3527GT													39			
1963	(Switzerland) Armand Boller	3527GT	GT +2.0												7			
1963	(United States) Rosebud Racing Team	3589GT		Ret	6													
1963	(United States) Rosebud Racing Team	3589GT	GT +2.0	Ret	3													
1963	(Italy) Ferdinando Pagliarini	3607GT							DNS							5		
1963	(Italy) Ferdinando Pagliarini	3607GT	GT +2.0						DNS							5		
1963	(Georgia (country)) Prince Zourab Tchkotoua	3647GT				8		Ret						Ret				
1963	(Georgia (country)) Prince Zourab Tchkotoua	3647GT	GT +2.0			3		Ret						Ret				
1963	(Italy) Scuderia San Marco	3705GT				13			23							6		
1963	(Italy) Scuderia San Marco	3705GT	GT +2.0			5			4							6		
1963	(United Kingdom) John Coombs	3729GT												2				
1963	(United Kingdom) John Coombs	3729GT	GT +2.0											2				
1963	(United Kingdom) David Piper	3767GT		21	14	DNS	Ret	6										Ret
1963	(United Kingdom) David Piper	3767GT	GT +2.0	11	8	DNS	Ret	3										Ret
1963	(United Kingdom) David Piper	4491GT										9		5		4		
1963	(United Kingdom) David Piper	4491GT	GT +2.0									2		5		4		
1963	(Hungary) Kalman von Czazy	3809GT				DNS	Ret											
1963	(Hungary) Kalman von Czazy	3809GT	GT +2.0			DNS	Ret											
1963	(Italy) Scuderia Trentina	3851GT							9									
1963	(Italy) Scuderia Trentina	3851GT	GT +2.0						1									
1963	(Switzerland) Scuderia Filipinetti	3909GT					3	Ret							10		Ret	
1963	(Switzerland) Scuderia Filipinetti	3909GT	GT +2.0				3	Ret							2		Ret	
1963	(Belgium) Pierre Noblet	3943GT					2	2										
1963	(Belgium) Pierre Noblet	3943GT	GT +2.0				2	1										
1963	(United States) Mecom Racing Team	3987GT		2	4													
1963	(United States) Mecom Racing Team	3987GT	GT +2.0	2	1													
1963	(Belgium) Écurie Francorchamps	4153GT						DNS		4								
1963	(Belgium) Écurie Francorchamps	4153GT	GT +2.0					DNS		2								
1963	(Belgium) Écurie Francorchamps	4293GT					1			2								
1963	(Belgium) Écurie Francorchamps	4293GT	GT +2.0				1			1								
1963	(United States) N.A.R.T.	4219GT		1	13													
1963	(United States) N.A.R.T.	4219GT	GT +2.0	1	7													
1963	(United States) N.A.R.T.	4713GT								6				8			NC	
1963	(United States) N.A.R.T.	4713GT	GT +2.0							3				8			NC	
1963	(United Kingdom) Maranello Concessionaires	4399GT												1		2		
1963	(United Kingdom) Maranello Concessionaires	4399GT	GT +2.0											1		2		
1963	(Italy) Guido Fossati	4675GT															Ret	
1963	(Italy) Guido Fossati	4675GT	GT +2.0														Ret	
1963	(France) Jean Guichet	5111GT															1	
1963	(France) Jean Guichet	5111GT	GT +2.0														1	
1964	—			DAY (United States)	SEB (United States)	TGA (Italy)	SPA (Belgium)	NÜR (Germany)	LMS (France)	REI (France)	FRE (Germany)	GWD (United Kingdom)	CRA (Switzerland)	BRI (United States)	FRA (France)			
1964	(United States) Larry B. Perkins	3223GT		11	27													
1964	(United States) Larry B. Perkins	3223GT	GT +2.0	9	10													
1964	(United States) Mike Gammino	3387GT		DNS										DNS				
1964	(United States) Mike Gammino	3387GT	GT +2.0	DNS										DNS				
1964	(Italy) Scuderia Sant'Ambroeus	3413GT				5												
1964	(Italy) Scuderia Sant'Ambroeus	3413GT	GT +2.0			1												
1964	(Italy) Scuderia Sant'Ambroeus	4675GT					2											
1964	(Italy) Scuderia Sant'Ambroeus	4675GT	GT +2.0				2											
1964	(Sweden) Ulf Norinder	3445GT		5		9	Ret	Ret		17								
1964	(Sweden) Ulf Norinder	3445GT	GT +2.0	5		3	Ret	Ret		7								
1964	(Switzerland) Armand Boller	3527GT											50					
1964	(Switzerland) Armand Boller	3527GT	GT +2.0										8					
1964	(Italy) Menato Boffa	3647GT				Ret												
1964	(Italy) Menato Boffa	3647GT	GT +2.0			Ret												
1964	(Italy) Scuderia San Marco	3705GT				12												
1964	(Italy) Scuderia San Marco	3705GT	GT +2.0			5												
1964	(United Kingdom) Eddie Portman	3729GT										9						
1964	(United Kingdom) Eddie Portman	3729GT	GT +2.0									6						
1964	(United Kingdom) Peter Clarke	3757GT					Ret	28										
1964	(United Kingdom) Peter Clarke	3757GT	GT +2.0				Ret	9										
1964	(United States) Angels Aviation Racing Team	3767GT		DNS	28													
1964	(United States) Angels Aviation Racing Team	3767GT	GT +2.0	DNS	11													
1964	(France) Sylvain Garant	3769GT													NC			
1964	(France) Sylvain Garant	3769GT	GT +2.0												NC			
1964	(Switzerland) Pierre Sudan	3809GT											27					
1964	(Switzerland) Pierre Sudan	3809GT	GT +2.0										4					
1964	(Switzerland) Scuderia Filipinetti	3909GT				10												
1964	(Switzerland) Scuderia Filipinetti	3909GT	GT +2.0			4												
1964	(Belgium) Pierre Noblet	3943GT					13											
1964	(Belgium) Pierre Noblet	3943GT	GT +2.0				10											
1964	(Germany) Manfred Ramminger	4115GT					Ret	20										
1964	(Germany) Manfred Ramminger	4115GT	GT +2.0				Ret	5										
1964	(Belgium) Écurie Francorchamps	3607GT													13			
1964	(Belgium) Écurie Francorchamps	3607GT	GT +2.0												3			
1964	(Belgium) Écurie Francorchamps	4153GT					6	18							1			
1964	(Belgium) Écurie Francorchamps	4153GT	GT +2.0				5	4							1			
1964	(Belgium) Écurie Francorchamps	4757GT					Ret											
1964	(Belgium) Écurie Francorchamps	4757GT	GT +2.0				Ret											
1964	(Belgium) Écurie Francorchamps	5575GT					Ret	4	5	9					14			
1964	(Belgium) Écurie Francorchamps	5575GT	GT +2.0				Ret	2	2	4					4			
1964	(United Kingdom) Maranello Concessionaires	4399GT					1		6	3		6			DSQ			
1964	(United Kingdom) Maranello Concessionaires	4399GT	GT +2.0				1		3	1		4			DSQ			
1964	(United Kingdom) David Piper	4491GT		2			4	7		4		10						
1964	(United Kingdom) David Piper	4491GT	GT +2.0	2			4	3		2		7						
1964	(United States) N.A.R.T.	4713GT		3	15													
1964	(United States) N.A.R.T.	4713GT	GT +2.0	3	8													
1964	(United States) N.A.R.T.	5571GT		1	7				Ret	11								
1964	(United States) N.A.R.T.	5571GT	GT +2.0	1	4				Ret	5								
1964	(United States) N.A.R.T.	5573GT							9	Ret	5	Ret						
1964	(United States) N.A.R.T.	5573GT	GT +2.0						4	Ret	2	Ret						
1964	(Italy) S.E.F.A.C.	5573GT			Ret	Ret	3	2										
1964	(Italy) S.E.F.A.C.	5573GT	GT +2.0		Ret	Ret	3	1										
1964	(France) Fernand Tavano	5095GT													Ret			
1964	(France) Fernand Tavano	5095GT	GT +2.0												Ret			
1964	(France) Jean Guichet	5111GT													2			
1964	(France) Jean Guichet	5111GT	GT +2.0												2			
1965	—			(United States) DAY	(United States) SEB	(Italy) MON	(United Kingdom) OUL	(Italy) TGA	(Belgium) SPA	(Germany) NÜR	(Germany) ROS	(France) LMS	(France) REI	(Italy) ENN	(Switzerland) VIL	(United States) BRI		
1965	(Switzerland) Scuderia Filipinetti	3527GT				WD												
1965	(Switzerland) Scuderia Filipinetti	3527GT	GT +2.0			WD												
1965	(Switzerland) Scuderia Filipinetti	3909GT						Ret										
1965	(Switzerland) Scuderia Filipinetti	3909GT	GT +2.0					Ret										
1965	(Italy) Sergio Marchesi	3647GT						30										
1965	(Italy) Sergio Marchesi	3647GT	GT +2.0					3										
1965	(Switzerland) Cox Kocher	3705GT													23			
1965	(Switzerland) Cox Kocher	3705GT	GT +2.0												1			
1965	(United Kingdom) Peter Clarke	3757GT		7	Ret					Ret			Ret	7				
1965	(United Kingdom) Peter Clarke	3757GT	GT +2.0	4	Ret					Ret			Ret	5				
1965	(Italy) Scuderia Pegaso	3765LM						Ret						5				
1965	(Italy) Scuderia Pegaso	3765LM	GT +2.0					Ret						3				
1965	(Italy) Scuderia Pegaso	4091GT						12						6				
1965	(Italy) Scuderia Pegaso	4091GT	GT +2.0					1						4				
1965	(United Kingdom) Carl Steward Richardson	3869GT													59			
1965	(United Kingdom) Carl Steward Richardson	3869GT	GT +2.0												8			
1965	(Germany) Werner Lindermann	4115GT								23								
1965	(Germany) Werner Lindermann	4115GT	GT +2.0							5								
1965	(Belgium) Écurie Francorchamps	4153GT							Ret				Ret					
1965	(Belgium) Écurie Francorchamps	4153GT	GT +2.0						Ret				Ret					
1965	(Belgium) Écurie Francorchamps	4757GT							DNS									
1965	(Belgium) Écurie Francorchamps	4757GT	GT +2.0						DNS									
1965	(United Kingdom) Maranello Concessionaires	4399GT					12		6	Ret								
1965	(United Kingdom) Maranello Concessionaires	4399GT	GT +2.0				8		3	Ret								
1965	(United Kingdom) Peter Sutcliffe	4491GT					5		4	15			Ret					
1965	(United Kingdom) Peter Sutcliffe	4491GT	GT +2.0				2		1	4			Ret					
1965	(Italy) Scuderia Brescia Corse	4675GT				11												
1965	(Italy) Scuderia Brescia Corse	4675GT	GT +2.0			3												

== See also ==
- Ferrari 250
- Ferrari 250 GT SWB Breadvan, a 250 SWB modified by Giotto Bizzarrini and Piero Drogo for Giovanni Volpi, in order to challenge the 250 GTO
