= 1964 12 Hours of Reims =

Coordinates: 49°15′14.67″N 3°55′50.02″E

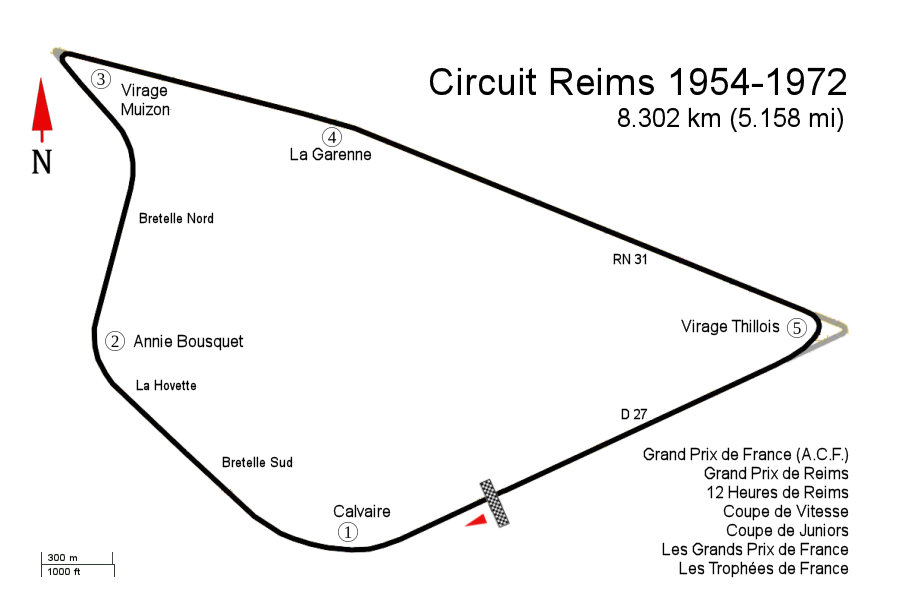
Reims-Gueux (1954-1972)

The 12 Hours of Reims (official name: 12 Heures internationales de Reims) were a sports car endurance racing series held from 1953 to 1967 at the circuit Reims (Gueux).

== Race report ==
- Championnat du Monde des Constructeurs - Trophée France-Amérique, Les 12 Heures Internationales de Reims
- July 5, 1964, Circuit Reims (France), 8.302 km, World Sportscar Championship (round 10)
- Classes Prototypes: +3000 cc (P+3.0), 3000 cc (P3.0), 2000 cc (P2.0) 1300 cc (P1.3)
- Classes Grand Touring: +3000 cc (GT+3.0), 3000 cc (GT3.0), 2000 cc (GT2.0), 1300 cc (GT1.3)
- Pole Position overall: (Italy) #8 Ferrari 250 LM, (United Kingdom) John Surtees, 2:19.2 - 214.681 km/h (133.396 mph)
- Fastest Lap overall: (Italy) #7 Ferrari 250 LM, (United Kingdom) Graham Hill, 2:19.2 - 214.681 km/h (133.396 mph)

=== Results overall ===
Pos	No	Drivers	Team	Constructor / Car	Class	Laps	Distance	km/h - mph av.
1	7	(United Kingdom) Graham Hill (Sweden) Jo Bonnier	(United Kingdom) Maranello Concessionaires	(Italy) Ferrari 250 LM	P+3.0	296	2448.933 km	178.644 km/h (111.004 mph)
2	8	(United Kingdom) John Surtees (Italy) Lorenzo Bandini	(United States) N.A.R.T.	(Italy) Ferrari 250 LM	P+3.0	295	2441.222 km	203.435 km/h (126.408 mph)
3	25	(United Kingdom) Mike Parkes (Italy) Ludovico Scarfiotti	(United Kingdom) Maranello Concessionaires	(Italy) Ferrari 250 GTO	GT3.0	279	2313.252 km	192.771 km/h (119.782 mph)
4	24	(United Kingdom) David Piper (South Africa) Tony Maggs	(United Kingdom) David Piper Racing	(Italy) Ferrari 250 GTO	GT3.0	273	2263.355 km	188.612 km/h (117.198 mph)
5	44	(Argentina) Andrea Vianini (Argentina) Nasif Estéfano	(Argentina) and (Italy) Andrea Vianini	(Germany) Porsche 904 GTS	GT2.0	273	2259.672 km	188.306 km/h (117.007 mph)
6	42	(Germany) Gerhard Koch (Germany) Gerhard Mitter	(Germany) Porsche	(Germany) Porsche 904 GTS	GT2.0	271	2248.339 km	187.361 km/h (116.420 mph)
7	39	(Netherlands) Ben Pon (Netherlands) Rob Slotemaker	(Netherlands) Racing Team Holland	(Germany) Porsche 904 GTS	GT2.0	270	2235.979 km	186.331 km/h (115.780 mph)
8	26	(United Kingdom) Dick Protheroe (United Kingdom) John Coundley	(United Kingdom) Protheroe Cars	(United Kingdom) Jaguar E-type Lightweight	GT+3.0	270	2234.296 km	186.191 km/h (115.693 mph)
9	28	(Belgium) Lucien Bianchi (France) Pierre Dumay	(Belgium) Ecurie Francorchamps	(Italy) Ferrari 250 GTO	GT3.0	269	2232.291 km	186.024 km/h (115.589 mph)
10	36	(France) Robert Buchet (France) Guy Ligier	(France) Auguste Veuillet	(Germany) Porsche 904 GTS	GT2.0	268	2224.570 km	185.380 km/h (115.189 mph)
11	26	(Mexico) Pedro Rodriguez (Italy) Nino Vaccarella	(United States) N.A.R.T.	(Italy) Ferrari 250 GTO	GT3.0	264	2191.391 km	182.615 km/h (113.471 mph)
12	38	(Switzerland) Herbert Müller (Switzerland) André Knörr	(Switzerland) Scuderia Filipinetti	(Germany) Porsche 904 GTS	GT2.0	262	2173.024 km	181.085 km/h (112.521 mph)
13	37	(France) Annie Soisbault (Belgium) Claude Dubois	(France) Auguste Veuillet	(Germany) Porsche 904 GTS	GT2.0	262	2168.172 km	180.681 km/h (112.269 mph)
14	17	(United Kingdom) Peter Sutcliffe (United Kingdom) William Bradley	(United Kingdom) Peter Sutcliffe	(United Kingdom) Jaguar E-type Lightweight	GT+3.0	261`	2163.679 km	180.306 km/h (112.036 mph)
15	40	(Netherlands) Henk van Zalinge (Netherlands) David van Lennep	(Netherlands) Racing Team Holland	(Germany) Porsche 904 GTS	GT2.0	260	2150.247 km	179.187 km/h (111.341 mph)
16	43	(France) "Franc" (France) Jean Kerguen	(France) "Franc"	(Germany) Porsche 904 GTS	GT2.0	250	2072.912 km	172.742 km/h (107.336 mph)
17	29	(New Zealand) Chris Amon (Scotland) Jackie Stewart	(Sweden) Ulf Norinder	(Italy) Ferrari 250 GTO	GT3.0	248	2050.775 km	170.897 km/h (106.190 mph)
18	51	(France) Roger de Lageneste (Republic of Ireland) Henry Morrogh	(France) Automobiles Alpine	(France) Alpine M64 Renault	P1.3	241	2000.142 km	166.678 km/h (103.568 mph)
19	50	(France) José Rosinski (Belgium) Henri Grandsire	(France) Automobiles Alpine	(France) Alpine M64 Renault	P1.3	239	1983.566 km	165.297 km/h (102.710 mph)
20	49	(France) Mauro Bianchi (France) Jean Vinatier	(France) Automobiles Alpine	(France) Alpine M64 Renault	P1.3	218	1809.208 km	150.767 km/h (93.682 mph)
DNF	33	(Germany) Edgar Barth (United Kingdom) Colin Davis	(Germany) Porsche	(Germany) Porsche 904/8	P2.0	51		Gearbox
DNF	2	(Belgium) Pierre Noblet (Switzerland) Edgar Berney	(Italy) Bizzarrini	(Italy) Iso Grifo A3C Chevrolet	P+3.0			Valve
DNF	3	(France) Maurice Trintignant (France) André Simon	(France) John Simone	(United Kingdom) Maserati Tipo 151/3	P+3.0			Ignition
DNF	4	(New Zealand) Bruce McLaren (United States) Phil Hill	(United States) Ford Racing Division	(United States) Ford GT40	P+3.0			Engine
DNF	5	(United States) Richie Ginther (United States) Masten Gregory	(United States) Ford Racing Division	(United States) Ford GT40	P+3.0			Gearbox
DNF	6	(United Kingdom) Richard Attwood (France) Jo Schlesser	(United States) Ford Racing Division	(United States) Ford GT40	P+3.0			Rear axle
DNF	9	(Belgium) Gerard van Ophem (Belgium) Jean Beurlys	(Belgium) Ecurie Francorchamps	(Italy) Ferrari 250 LM	P+3.0			Differential
DNF	14	(United Kingdom) Innes Ireland (Germany) Jochen Neerpasch	(United States) Shelby International	(United States) Shelby Cobra Daytona	GT+3.0			Gearbox
DNF	15	(United States) Dan Gurney (United States) Bob Bondurant	(United States) Shelby International	(United States) Shelby Cobra Daytona	P+3.0			Overheating
DNF	27	(United States) Bob Grossman (United States) Skip Hudson	(United States) N.A.R.T.	(Italy) Ferrari 250 GTO	GT3.0			Engine
DNF	41	(Switzerland) Jo Siffert (Switzerland) Heinz Schiller	(Switzerland) Heinz Schiller	(Germany) Porsche 904 GTS	GT2.0			Clutch
DNF	46	(France) Bernard Collomb (Switzerland) André Wicky	(Switzerland) André Wicky	(United Kingdom) Lotus Elan	P2.0			Valve
DNF	52	(France) Philippe Vidal (Italy) Jacques Maglia	(France) Automobiles Alpine	(France) Alpine M64 Renault	P1.3			Engine
DNF	53	(France) Jean-Pierre Beltoise (France) Gérard Laureau	(France) Automobiles René Bonnet	(France) Bonnet Djet Renault	P1.3			Accident, fire
DNF	54	(France) Robert Bouharde (France) Jean Vinatier (France) Eric Offenstadt	(France) Automobiles René Bonnet	(France) Bonnet Aérodjet Renault	P1.3			N/A
DNF	56	(France) Jean-François Piot (France) Alain Bertaut	(United Kingdom) Triumph Motor Company	(United Kingdom) Triumph Spitfire	GT1.3			Engine
DNF	60	(France) Philippe Farjon (France) Serge Lelong	(France) Automobiles René Bonnet	(France) Bonnet Djet Renault	GT1.3			Head gasket

=== Winners by class ===
Class	Drivers	Team	Constructor	Laps	Distance	km/h - mph av.
P+3.0	(United Kingdom) Graham Hill (Sweden) Jo Bonnier	(United Kingdom) Maranello Concessionaires	(Italy) Ferrari 250 LM	296	2448.933 km	178.644 km/h (111.004 mph)
P3.0	(Portugal) Mário Cabral (Italy) Teodoro Zeccoli	(United Kingdom) A.T.S. Francis	(United Kingdom) ATS 2500 GT	Did not start - Not classified		
P2.0	N/A; N/A	(United Kingdom) Ian Walker Racing	(United Kingdom) Lotus Elan 26R	Not classified (In entry list)		
P1.3	(France) Roger de Lageneste (Republic of Ireland) Henry Morrogh	(France) Automobiles Alpine	(France) Alpine M64 Renault	241	2000.142 km	166.678 km/h (103.568 mph)
GT+3.0	(United Kingdom) Dick Protheroe (United Kingdom) John Coundley	(United Kingdom) Protheroe Cars	(United Kingdom) Jaguar E-type Lightweight	270	2234.296 km	186.191 km/h (115.693 mph)
GT3.0	(United Kingdom) Mike Parkes (Italy) Ludovico Scarfiotti	(United Kingdom) Maranello Concessionaires	(Italy) Ferrari 250 GTO	279	2313.252 km	192.771 km/h (119.782 mph)
GT2.0	(Argentina) Andrea Vianini (Argentina) Nasif Estéfano	(Argentina) and (Italy) Andrea Vianini	(Germany) Porsche 904 GTS	273	2259.672 km	188.306 km/h (117.007 mph)
GT1.3	(France) Jean-François Piot (France) Alain Bertaut	(United Kingdom) Triumph Motor Company	(United Kingdom) Triumph Spitfire	DNF / Not classified (Engine)		
