= 1965 12 Hours of Reims =

Sports car endurance race

Coordinates: 49°15′14.67″N 3°55′50.02″E

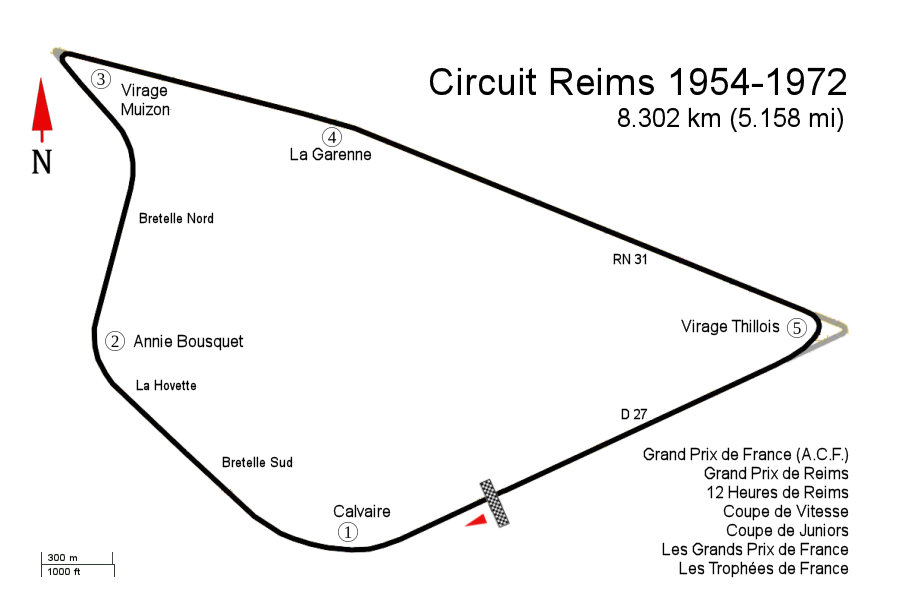
Reims-Gueux (1954-1972)

The 12 Hours of Reims (official name: 12 Heures internationales de Reims) were a sports car endurance racing series held in 1965 at the circuit Reims (Gueux).

== Race report ==
- Championnat du Monde des Constructeurs - 1965: Grands Prix de France Reims - Trophée Fédération française des Sports Automobiles
- July 4, 1965, Circuit Reims (France) - 8.302 km, World Sportscar Championship (round 13)
- Classes Prototypes: +3000 cc (P+3.0), 1300 cc (P1.3)
- Classes Grand Touring: +3000 cc (GT+3.0), 3000 cc (GT3.0), 2000 cc (GT2.0), 1300 cc (GT1.3)
- Pole Position overall: (Italy) #3 Ferrari 365 P2, (Mexico) Pedro Rodriguez, 2:18.2 - 216.234 km/h
- Fastest Lap overall: (Italy) #2 Ferrari 365 P2, (United Kingdom) John Surtees, 2:17.9 - 216.705 km/h

=== Results Overall ===
Pos	No	Drivers	Team	Constructor / Car	Class	Laps	Distance	km/h - mph av.
1	3	(Mexico) Pedro Rodriguez (France) Jean Guichet	(United States) N.A.R.T.	(Italy) Ferrari 365 P2	P+3.0	285	2366.070 km	197.170 km/h (122.520 mph)
2	2	(United Kingdom) John Surtees (United Kingdom) Mike Parkes	(United Kingdom) Maranello Concessionaires	(Italy) Ferrari 365 P2	P+3.0	283	2349.466 km	195.79 km/h (121.66 mph)
3	9	(Belgium) Willy Mairesse (Belgium) Jean Beurlys	(Belgium) Ecurie Francorchamps	(Italy) Ferrari 250 LM	GT+3.0	280	2324.560 km	193.710 km/h (120.370 mph)
4	8	(United Kingdom) David Piper (United Kingdom) Richard Attwood	(United Kingdom) David Piper Racing	(Italy) Ferrari 250 LM	GT+3.0	274	2274.748 km	189.560 km/h (117.790 mph)
5	26	(United States) Bob Bondurant (France) Jo Schlesser	(United States) Shelby International	(United States) Shelby Cobra Daytona	GT+3.0	270	2241.540 km	186.800 km/h (116.070 mph)
6	45	(Australia) Paul Hawkins (United Kingdom) Mike De Udy	(United Kingdom) Don Moore Racing	(Germany) Porsche 904 GTS	GT2.0	262	2175.124 km	181.26 km/h (112.63 mph)
7	15	(Belgium) Lucien Bianchi (France) Henri Grandsire	(France) Automobiles Alpine	(France) Alpine M65 Renault	P1.3	249	2067.198 km	172.270 km/h (107.040 mph)
8	16	(France) Jean Vinatier (France) Roger de Lageneste	(France) Automobiles Alpine	(France) Alpine M64 Renault	P1.3	244	2025.688 km	168.811 km/h (104.890 mph)
9	27	(United Kingdom) Jack Sears (United Kingdom) John Whitmore	(United Kingdom) Willment Racing Team	(Italy) Ferrari 250 GTO	GT+3.0	241	2000.782 km	166.732 km/h (103.600 mph)
10	47	(France) Claude Barbier (France) Andre Potier	(France) Claude Barbier	(Germany) Porsche 904 GTS	GT2.0	232	1926.064 km	160.509 km/h (99.729 mph)
11	17	(France) Philippe Vidal (Belgium) Mauro Bianchi	(France) Automobiles Alpine	(France) Alpine M64 Renault	P1.3	223	1851.346 km	154.280 km/h (95.861 mph)
12	18	(France) Guy Verrier (France) Jacques Cheinisse	(France) Automobiles Alpine	(France) Alpine M64 Renault	P1.3	220	1826.440 km	152.209 km/h (94.570 mph)
13	60	(France) Robert Bouharde (France) Pierre Monneret	(France) Automobiles Alpine	(France) Alpine A110	GT1.3	217	1801.534 km	150.130 km/h (93.290 mph)
DNF	1	(United Kingdom) Graham Hill (Sweden) Jo Bonnier	(United Kingdom) Maranello Concessionaires	(Italy) Ferrari 330 P	P+3.0	51		Gearbox
DNF	5	(Belgium) Pierre Noblet (Portugal) Mário Cabral	(Italy) Bizzarrini Iso Grifo	(Italy) Iso Grifo A3C Chevrolet	P+3.0			Clutch
DNF	6	(France) Jean de Mortemart (France) Régis Fraissinet	(Italy) Bizzarrini Iso Grifo	(Italy) Iso Grifo A3C Chevrolet	P+3.0			Head Gasket
DNF	10	(France) Pierre Dumay (Belgium) Gustave Gosselin	(United States) Ford Racing	(United States) Ford GT40	P+3.0			Gearbox
DNF	11	(Belgium) Gerard van Ophem (France) Annie Soisbault	(Belgium) Ecurie Francorchamps	(Italy) Ferrari 250 LM	P+3.0			Accident
DNF	25	(Australia) Frank Gardner (United Kingdom) Innes Ireland	(United States) Ford Racing	(United States) Ford GT40	GT+3.0			Engine
DNF	35	(United Kingdom) Peter Sutcliffe (United Kingdom) William Bradley	(United Kingdom) Peter Sutcliffe	(Italy) Ferrari 250 GTO	GT3.0			Steering Box
DNF	36	(United Kingdom) Peter Clarke (United Kingdom) Rollo Fielding	(United Kingdom) Peter Clarke	(Italy) Ferrari 250 GTO	GT3.0			Starter Motor
DNF	37	(France) Guy Ligier (United States) Allen Grant	(Belgium) Ecurie Francorchamps	(Italy) Ferrari 250 GTO	GT3.0			Engine
DNS	7	(United Kingdom) Dick Protheroe (United Kingdom) Mike Salmon	(United Kingdom) Dick Protheroe	(Italy) Ferrari 250 GTO	GT3.0			Did not start (Paddock accident)

=== Winners by class ===
Class	Drivers	Team	Constructor / Car	Laps	Distance	km/h - mph av.
P+3.0	(Mexico) Pedro Rodriguez (France) Jean Guichet	(United States) N.A.R.T.	(Italy) Ferrari 365 P2	285	2366.070 km	197.170 km/h (122.520 mph)
P+1.3	(Belgium) Lucien Bianchi (France) Henri Grandsire	(France) Automobiles Alpine	(France) Alpine M65 Renault	249	2067.198 km	172.270 km/h (107.040 mph)
GT+3.0	(United States) Bob Bondurant (France) Jo Schlesser	(United States) Shelby International	(United States) Shelby Cobra Daytona	270	2241.540 km	186.800 km/h (116.070 mph)
GT3.0	(United Kingdom) Peter Sutcliffe (United Kingdom) William Bradley	(United Kingdom) Peter Sutcliffe	(Italy) Ferrari 250 GTO	DNF (Steering Box)		
GT2.0	(Australia) Paul Hawkins (United Kingdom) Mike De Udy	(United Kingdom) Don Moore Racing	(Germany) Porsche 904 GTS	262	2175.124 km	181.26 km/h (112.63 mph)
GT1.3	(France) Robert Bouharde (France) Pierre Monneret	(France) Automobiles Alpine	(France) Alpine A110	217	1801.534 km	150.130 km/h (93.290 mph)
