= George Arents =

American businessmen

George Arents Jr. (born 1875 - December 13, 1960) was an American businessman who directed the American Tobacco Company and was the treasurer for the American Machine and Foundry as well as the International Cigar Machinery. He was in one race, which was the 1904 Vanderbilt Cup Races where his Mercedes overturned, causing a serious head injury and Carl Mensel, his driving mechanic, to die.

== Early life ==
Arents was born in 1875 to a wealthy family in America. His great uncle Lewis Ginter and father also named George Arents were founders of the Allen & Ginter Tobacco Company, which later became the American Tobacco Company. His father died in 1918 leaving an estate of $10 million in which 1/3 went to his son George Arents III. He studied at Columbia University and received his master's degree from Syracuse University.

== Racing accident ==
While racing in the 1904 Vanderbilt Cup Races, his Mercedes 60's left rear tire blew. The bare rim struck a trolley track, overturning the car. He was thrown from the car and suffered a serious head injury. He recovered from the injury, but his driving mechanic died due to this accident.

== Death ==
Arents died on December 13, 1960, donating $2 million to Syracuse University and $1 million to the New York Public Library. He left a bulk of his estate for his son, George Arents III.
