= North American Racing Team =

Motorsports racing team

(United States) North American Racing Team
- Founded: 1958
- Founder(s): Luigi Chinetti
- Team principal(s): Luigi Chinetti
- Former series: Formula One; WSC; Can-Am
- Noted drivers: (Mexico) Pedro Rodríguez (Mexico) Ricardo Rodríguez (United States) Phil Hill (Austria) Jochen Rindt (United States) Masten Gregory (United States) Mario Andretti (France) Jean Guichet

The North American Racing Team (NART) is a motorsport racing team founded in 1958. It was created by businessman Luigi Chinetti to promote the Ferrari marque in North America through success in endurance racing.

It was created in 1958 when Chinetti received backing from wealthy racers George Arents, Jr and Jan de Vroom. Ferrari already had a close relationship with Chinetti due to his success in selling the maker's road cars in the important American markets, and thus NART received a continuous line of Ferrari racers and support from factory mechanics.

== In racing ==
NART raced at only the world's premier races, such as the 24 Hours of Daytona in Florida and the 24 Hours of Le Mans in Le Mans, France. Their first race was the 12 Hours of Sebring in March 1958, with a 250 GT.

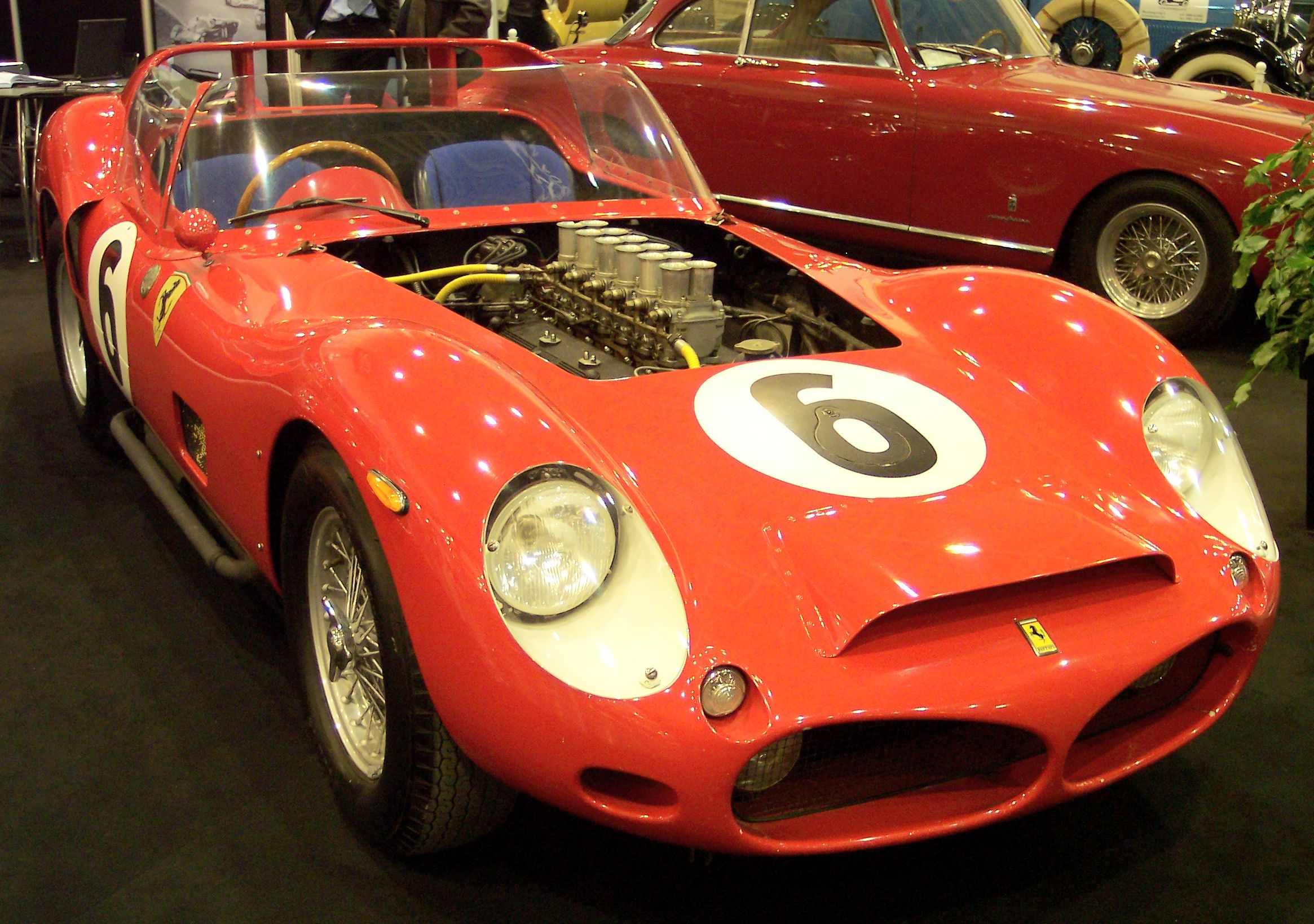
1962 Le Mans-winning Ferrari 330 TRI/LM, bought by Pedro Rodríguez through NART. Rodríguez raced several times in it.

Pedro Rodríguez won the second and the third editions of Daytona with the NART team, both in a Ferrari 250 GTO. The 1963 event was a three hour race and the 1964 event was a 2,000 km race; the 24 hour race would start in 1966.

A Ferrari 158 car officially entered by NART sealed the win of the 1964 F1 World championship with John Surtees, as the works team competed the last two races (the United States Grand Prix and Mexican Grand Prix) in cars painted white with blue lengthwise "Cunningham racing stripes" - the national colours of the teams licensed in the United States. This was done as a protest concerning arguments between Ferrari and the Italian motorsport body ACI regarding the homologation of a new mid-engined Ferrari race car. Since the Ferrari cars entered in the 1965 and 1969 F1 seasons by NART and at the 1966 Italian Grand Prix by the British privateer Reg Parnell team kept wearing the red colour, the 1964 Mexican Grand Prix was the last time Ferrari cars wore other than the traditional red colour (rosso corsa) in Formula One.

The peak of NART's own racing success came in 1965, when a NART-entered 250 LM driven by Jochen Rindt and Masten Gregory became the last Ferrari to win Le Mans until the AF Corse-entered 499P at the 2023 24 Hours of Le Mans.

Other NART results include a third place in the 1967 24 Hours of Daytona with Pedro Rodríguez and Jean Guichet, backing up two works 330 P4 in Ferrari's triple success, which was commemorated by the naming of the 365 GTB4 "Daytona". With this model, NART scored second in the 1973 24 Hours of Daytona behind a Porsche 911.

NART raced Ferraris until 1982, at which point it had participated in more than 200 races with over 100 different drivers, including Mario Andretti and Phil Hill.

== Road cars ==
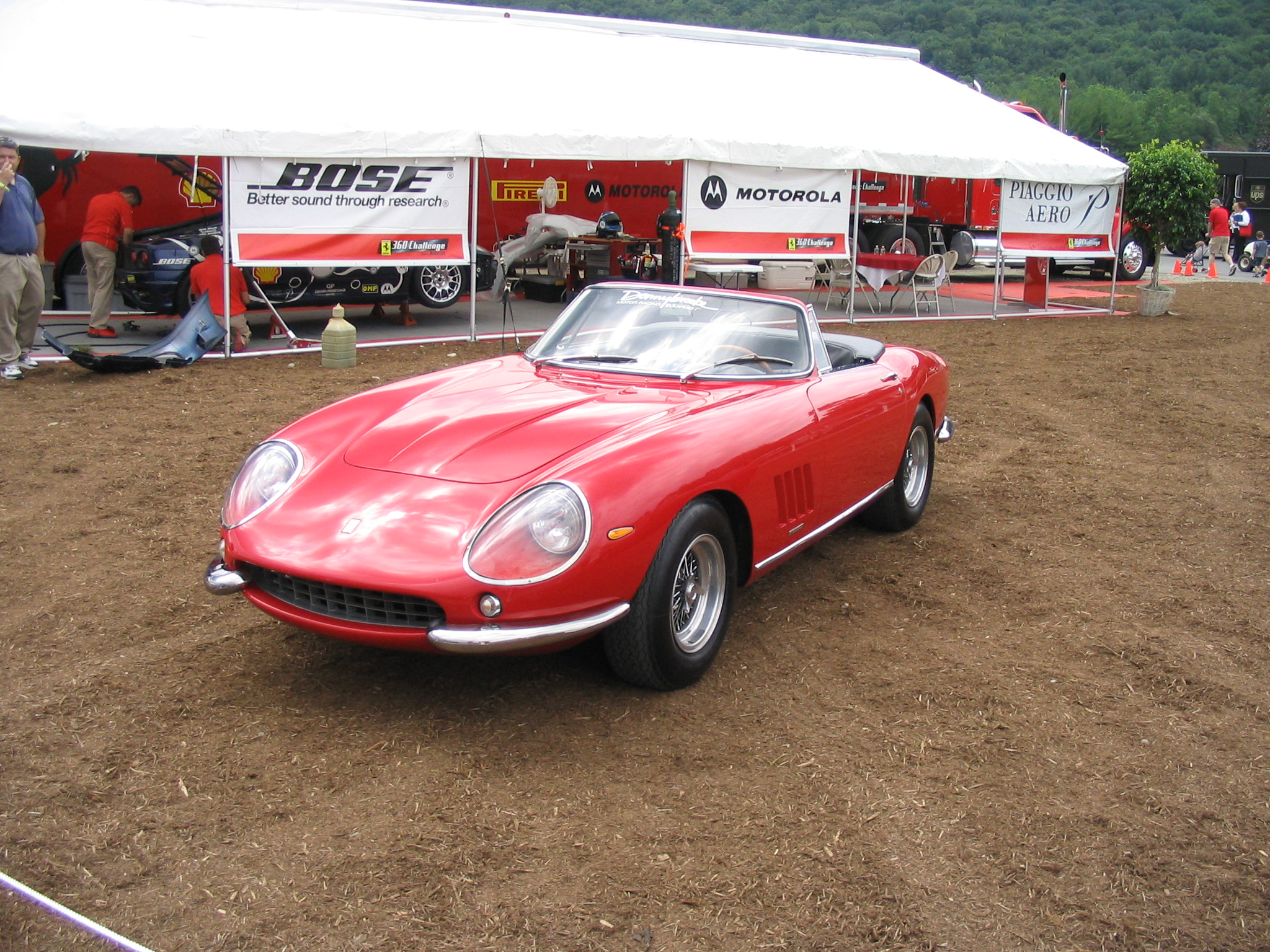
275 GTB/4S NART Spyder

NART also had a Ferrari model with its name attached to it – the 1967 275 GTB/4S NART Spyder was a convertible version of the 275 GTB/4 requested especially by Luigi Chinetti. The original order of 25 cars was never fulfilled, as only 10 were delivered from the Maranello factory. Because of the popularity of the drop-top NART Spyder design, many 275 GTB/4 were converted to drop-top models to imitate the NART Spyder's design.

From 1986, NART built another vehicle, of which there are only two. The Ferrari 365 GT 2+2 NART Spyder Designed by Luigi "Coco" Chinetti, built by Carrozzeria Autosport in Modena and with the approval of Ferrari.

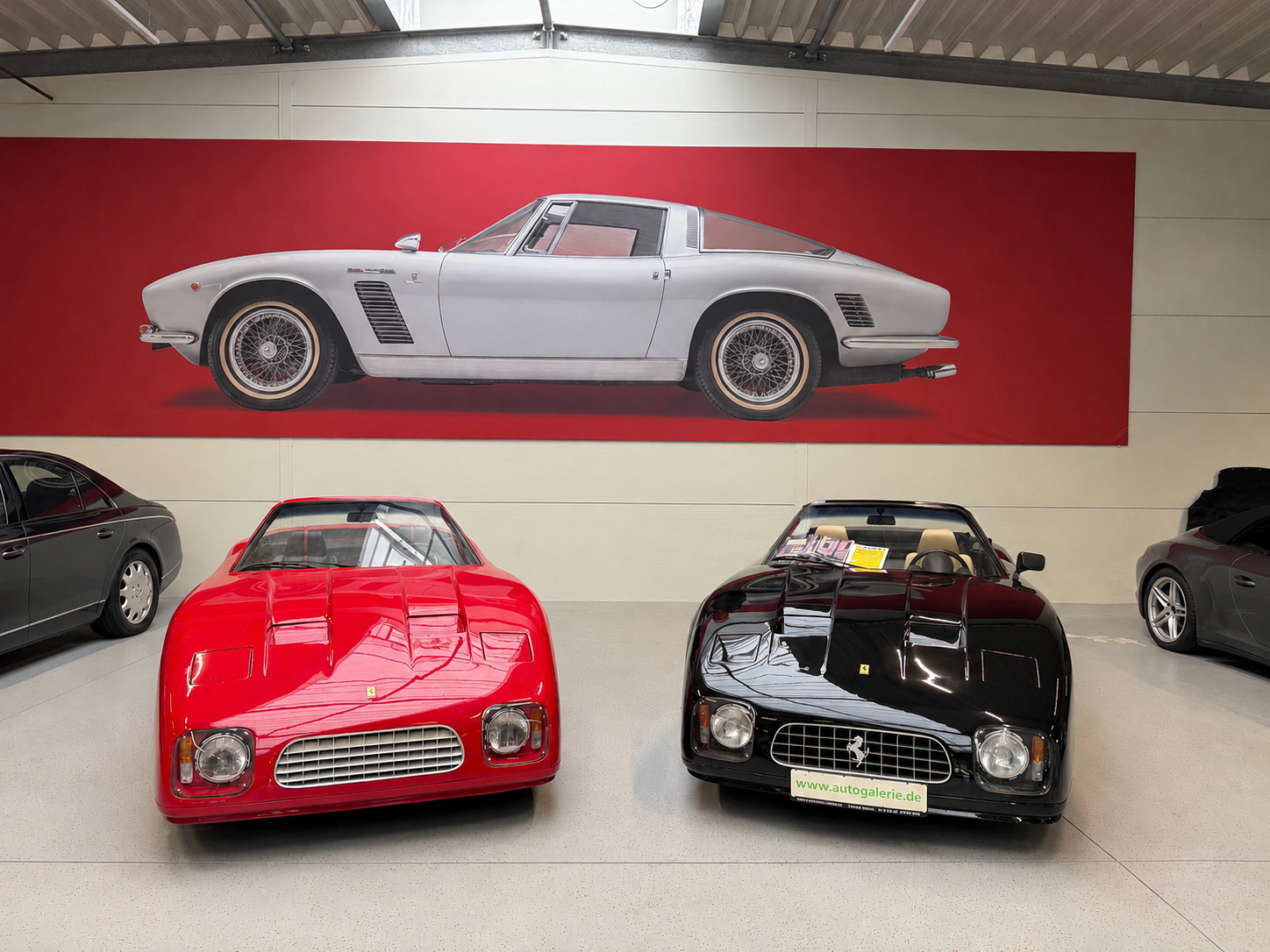
both of the Ferrari 365 GT 2+2 NART Spyder (12605 and 12611) in the Autogalerie Sinzig, Germany

== Results ==
=== Victories in the World Sportscar Championship ===
Year	Race	Car	Driver 1	Driver 2
1962	400 km of Bridgehampton	Ferrari 330 TRI/LM	(Mexico) Pedro Rodríguez	
1962	1000 km of Paris	Ferrari 250 GTO	(Mexico) Pedro Rodríguez	(Mexico) Ricardo Rodríguez
1963	Daytona 3 Hours	Ferrari 250 GTO	(Mexico) Pedro Rodríguez	
1964	Daytona 2000 km	Ferrari 250 GTO	(Mexico) Pedro Rodríguez	(United States) Phil Hill
1965	24 Hours of Le Mans	Ferrari 250 LM	(Austria) Jochen Rindt	(United States) Masten Gregory
1965	12 Hours of Reims	Ferrari 365 P2	(Mexico) Pedro Rodríguez	(France) Jean Guichet

=== Formula One World Championship results ===
(key) (Results in bold indicate pole position; results in italics indicate fastest lap; † indicates shared drive.)

Year	Chassis	Engines	Tyres	Drivers	1	2	3	4	5	6	7	8	9	10	11
1964	Ferrari 158	Ferrari 205B 1.5 V8	D		MON	NED	BEL	FRA	GBR	GER	AUT	ITA	USA	MEX	
1964	Ferrari 158	Ferrari 205B 1.5 V8	D	(United Kingdom) John Surtees									2	2	
1964	Ferrari 1512	Ferrari 207 1.5 V12	D	(Italy) Lorenzo Bandini									Ret	3	
1964	Ferrari 156 F1	Ferrari 178 1.5 V6	D	(Mexico) Pedro Rodríguez										6	
1965	Ferrari 1512	Ferrari 207 1.5 V12	D		RSA	MON	BEL	FRA	GBR	NED	GER	ITA	USA	MEX	
1965	Ferrari 1512	Ferrari 207 1.5 V12	D	(Mexico) Pedro Rodriguez									5	7	
1965	Ferrari 158	Ferrari 205B 1.5 V8	D	(United States) Bob Bondurant									9		
1969	Ferrari 312	Ferrari 3.0 V12	F		RSA	ESP	MON	NED	FRA	GBR	GER	ITA	CAN	USA	MEX
1969	Ferrari 312	Ferrari 3.0 V12	F	(Mexico) Pedro Rodríguez									Ret	5	7

== Bibliography ==
- Terry O'Neill (14 December 2015). N.A.R.T.: A Concise History of the North American Racing Team 1957 to 1983. Veloce Publishing. ISBN 978-1845847876.
