= Bob Bondurant School of High Performance Driving =

American performance driving school

- Founded: 1968
- Headquarters: Chandler, Arizona
- Key people: Bob Bondurant; Pat Bondurant

The Bob Bondurant School of High Performance Driving was an American performance driving school located in Chandler, Arizona at the Wild Horse Pass Motorsports Park. At the time of its founding, the school was the largest purpose-built driving school in the world. It featured a 15-turn, 1.6-mile road course, an eight-acre asphalt pad for advanced training with more than 100 race-prepared vehicles. Bob Bondurant's copyrighted Bondurant Method taught competition driving, police pursuit driving, evasive driving for chauffeurs and bodyguards, stunt driving, and other courses.

The school graduated over 500,000 drivers since its opening in 1968. Many NASCAR drivers were trained at Bondurant's school for road course training, along with many celebrity actors for driving scenes in films, including Paul Newman and Robert Wagner for the movie "Winning".

== History ==
The school was founded in 1968 by World Champion and ten-time hall of fame inductee Bob Bondurant, and was located at the Orange County International Raceway. He initially approached Porsche for funding and support, but his request was turned down due to the uncertainty of the endeavor. He then approached Datsun, which agreed to support his plans. The starting lineup of cars included Datsun 240Zs, 510s, 2000 convertibles, a Lola T70 Can-Am car, and a Formula Vee. By 1970, the school moved to the nearby Ontario Motor Speedway. Noting that the school increased Datsun's profile, Porsche began supplying Bondurant with Porsche 911s and Porsche 914s. In 1973, with the school gaining popularity, he moved the operation to a track of his own, Sears Point International Raceway (now called Infineon Raceway among other names) near Sonoma, California.

In 1976, the president of Ford Motor Company convinced Bondurant to abandon Datsun's backing and work with Ford, with whom he had won the World Championship during his racing years. Ford offered him a full sponsorship of cars, parts, and marketing until 2003. In 1989, Bondurant was invited to Firebird Raceway (now Firebird Motorsports Park) in Chandler to consider an endeavor promising the opportunity to build the world's first purpose-built driver training facility. However, land limitations only allowed a downsized version of his dream training facility. In late 2018, citing financial troubles and infrastructural damage, the school and company were forced into Chapter 11 protection. As a result, the school's assets were sold off in 2019.
