= Greg Whitten =

American computer engineer, investor and car collector

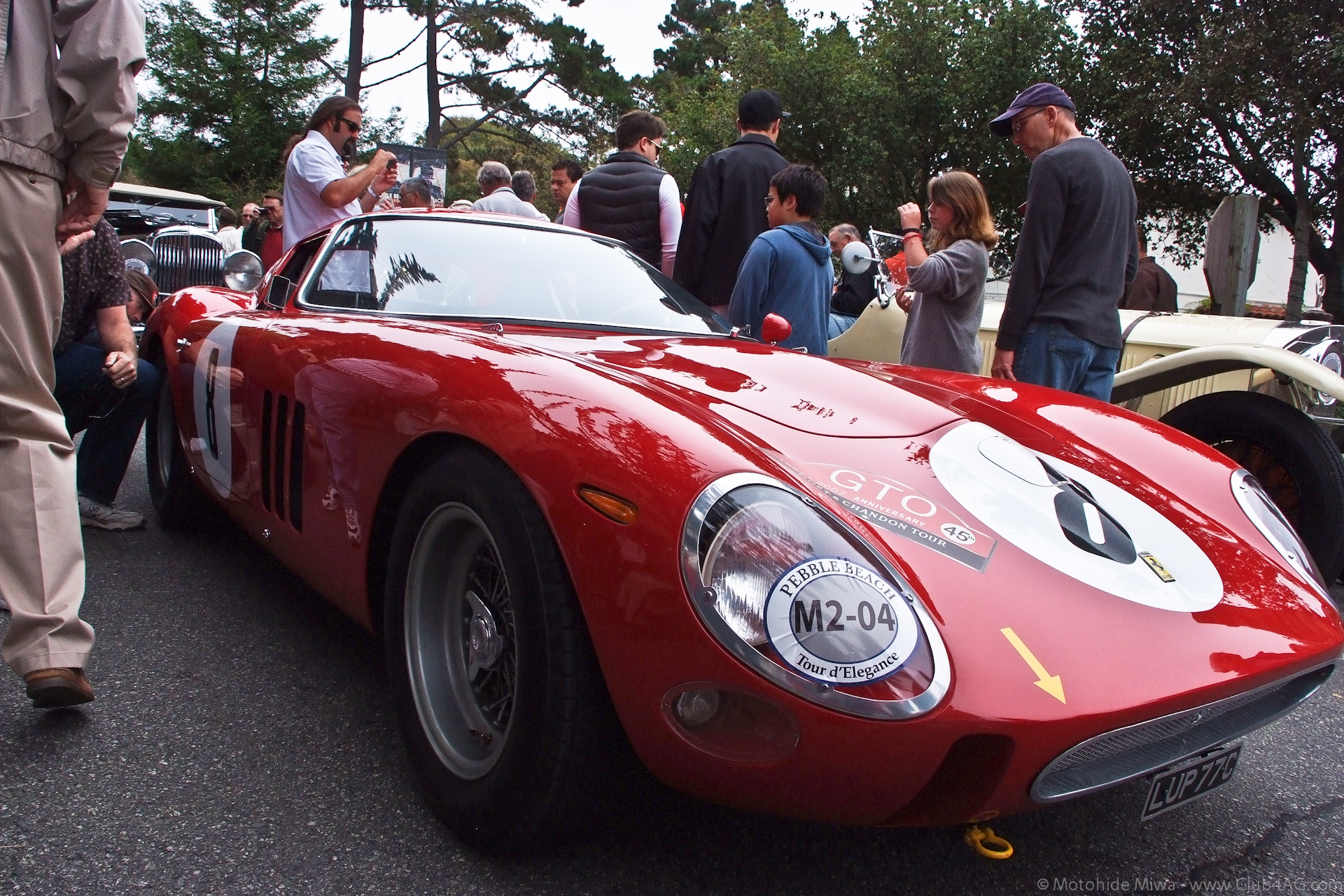
The #3413GT Ferrari 250 GTO was purchased by Whitten around 2000.

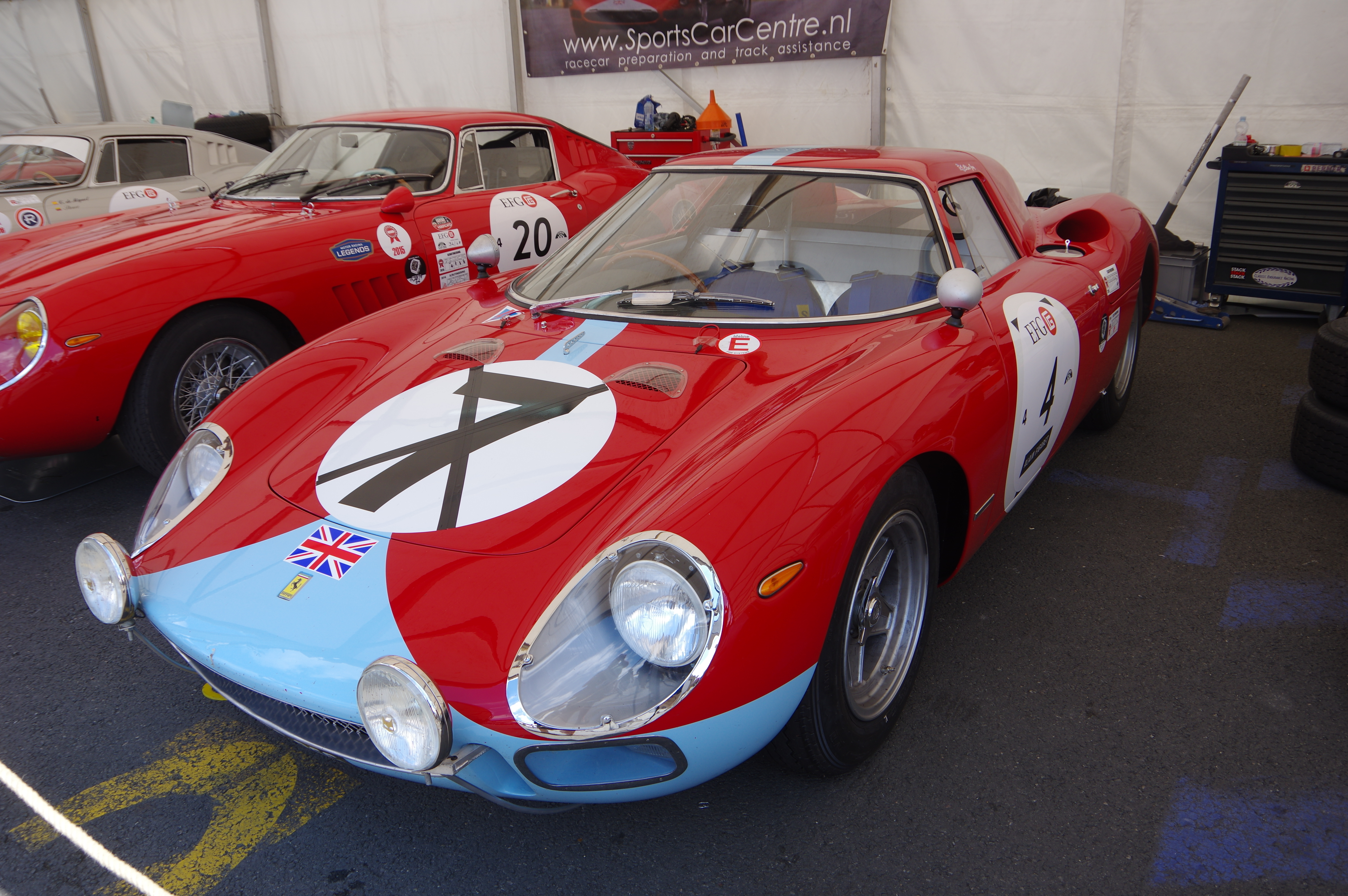
The #5907 Ferrari 250 LM was owned by Whitten 1994–2005.

Greg Whitten is an American computer engineer, investor and car collector.

Whitten graduated from the University of Virginia with a B.A. in mathematics in 1973, and from Harvard University with a Ph.D. in applied mathematics in 1978.

He worked for Compucolor, a company in Georgia established in 1977 that made the home computer Compucolor II (an early PC) but went out of business in 1983. While there, he reputedly optimized an unlicensed copy of Microsoft Basic so effectively that Microsoft later forgave Compucolor for their infringement in exchange for the rights to the enhancements.

== Microsoft 1979–1998 ==
He then worked for Microsoft from 1979 to 1998. He developed the standards for the company's BASIC compiler line.

"GW" in the name of the GW-BASIC dialect (first released 1983) of BASIC developed by Microsoft may have come from Greg Whitten's initials:

"The GW-BASIC name stands for Gee-Whiz BASIC. The GW- name was picked by Bill Gates. He is the one who knows whether it was Gee-Whiz or after me because it has been used both ways. I did set the directions for the BASIC language features after joining the company in 1979."

- Greg Whitten, 13 Apr 2005

As a chief software architect, he also oversaw the development of the enterprise support systems required in Windows for the Microsoft Office.

== Numerix 1998–2013 ==
In 1998 he became member of the board of Numerix, a financial software company established 1996, where he had made a major investment and in 2001 was elected Boardman after another major investment. After being its CEO 2003–13, he was succeeded by Steve O'Hanlon.

== Car collector ==
He is also a vintage car enthusiast and has a car collection that contains various Ferraris including his first, a Ferrari F40, a Ferrari Enzo (#131632), a Ferrari 250 GTO (#3413GT, 2000–2018), a Ferrari 250 LM (#5907, 1994–2005), a Ferrari 250 GT TdF (#0703GT, 1997–), a Ferrari F50 (#104163, 1995–2004), and two LaFerrari. His Ferrari 250 GTO sold for $48.8 million at a public auction in August 2018.
