= 1965 United States Grand Prix =

Race details
- Date: October 3, 1965
- Official name: VIII United States Grand Prix
- Location: Watkins Glen Grand Prix Race Course; Watkins Glen, New York
- Course: Permanent road course
- Course length: 3.78 km (2.35 miles)
- Distance: 110 laps, 415.8 km (258.5 miles)
- Weather: Rainy, windy, cold

Pole position
Driver	(United Kingdom) Graham Hill	BRM
- Time: 1:11.25

Fastest lap
Driver	(United Kingdom) Graham Hill	BRM
- Time: 1:11.9 on lap 105

Podium
First	(United Kingdom) Graham Hill	BRM
Second	(United States) Dan Gurney	Brabham-Climax
Third	(Australia) Jack Brabham	Brabham-Climax

The 1965 United States Grand Prix was a Formula One motor race held on October 3, 1965, at the Watkins Glen Grand Prix Race Course in Watkins Glen, New York. It was race 9 of 10 in both the 1965 World Championship of Drivers and the 1965 International Cup for Formula One Manufacturers. The 110-lap race was won by BRM driver Graham Hill after he started from pole position. Dan Gurney finished second for the Brabham team and his teammate Jack Brabham came in third.

== Summary ==
In the last year of the 1.5-liter formula, Jim Clark had clinched his second Drivers' Championship (as well as winning the Indianapolis 500) before the teams arrived in North America for the season's last two races. Once again, however, it was Graham Hill and BRM who reigned at The Glen, winning for the third year in a row. Hill took pole, win and fastest lap, finishing twelve seconds ahead of the Brabhams of Dan Gurney and Sir Jack.

The weekend was cold (45 °F (7 °C)), windy (30 mph), and often wet. In practice, Jim Clark—a Scot, no less—wore a sweater over his driving suit. Ferrari was missing the previous year's World Champion, John Surtees, who had been injured in a sports car race in Canada the previous week. Hill's new BRM teammate, Jackie Stewart, who had broken Clark's string of five consecutive victories with his first Grand Prix win at Monza three weeks before, was running at The Glen for the first time, as was Austrian Jochen Rindt. American Bob Bondurant was making his Formula One debut.

The track was shrouded in mist on Friday, as Clark switched back and forth between his Lotus, with a 32-valve Climax engine, and teammate Mike Spence's 16-valve model. After bending the suspension on Spence's car by hitting the curb in 'The 90', Clark got back in his car and did a 1:12.7, which was fastest of the day until Hill beat it by two-tenths.

On Saturday, sunny but still cold, Clark and Hill continued their battle. Hill posted a 1:11.25 in the BRM, and Clark just failed to match him in his 32-valve Lotus, getting down to 1:11.35 before he sheared two teeth on a timing gear. Again, the Scot took teammate Spence's car, and he recorded a remarkable time of 1:11.16 to complete the duel. Overnight, however, the 32-valve engine was repaired, and when Clark decided to use it in the race, he would have to start from the second spot, alongside Hill. American Richie Ginther used the spare Honda to grab third spot, as the powerful V–12 made him the fastest car down the straight. The top six on the grid were Hill, Clark, Ginther, Spence, Lorenzo Bandini's Ferrari and Stewart.

It rained on Sunday morning, but a strong wind dried the track in time for the start, and 60,000 fans watched with hoods and parkas against the changing conditions. Hill jumped into an early lead, trailed by Clark and Ginther. Stewart charged up from the third row and moved inside Ginther in the Esses, but the Honda pinched the gap closed, forcing Stewart into the curb and bending his suspension. Stewart continued, while the stunned Ginther dropped back to eighth, but the throttle cable on Stewart's car split and he limped around to the pits. By the time he rejoined the race, the rain had returned, making his bent suspension too big of a handicap, and he retired.

On the second lap, Clark took the lead from Hill, as the two pulled away from Bandini, Spence, Gurney and Brabham. Three laps later, Hill regained the lead, and the two British World Champions dueled until lap 12, when Hill's BRM appeared alone, and Clark coasted into the pits with a broken piston. The group of four following the leaders had been battling hard, as Spence was twice forced off the road by Bandini, and retired on lap six with a broken timing chain. Hill now led Gurney by 14 seconds, followed by Bandini and Brabham.

By lap 24, Hill led by almost half a lap. Then, a sudden shower soaked the track as the leader began lap 37. In 'The Loop' at the end of the back straight, Hill was caught out by the slippery surface and went straight on into the grass, then bounced along for 200 yards before regaining the track. Hill's Dunlop tires were two seconds per lap slower in the wet than the Brabham team's Goodyears, and, aided by the off-track excursion, Gurney and Jack Brabham were able to close the sizable gap. Gurney pulled right up on the BRM's tailpipes, but in his zeal, he overdid a corner and allowed teammate Brabham by into second. Now, it was team leader Brabham's turn to have a go, and he moved ahead of Hill on the outside of 'The 90,' right before the pits. Hill had been consistently taking corners with a late apex, then power-sliding the car around the outside of the turn's exit. Hill's wide line out of the corner again carried him to the edge of the track, and with Brabham on his left, he forced the two-time Champion off and into a slow 360 across the wet grass. Gurney was back in second, and Brabham rejoined, once again in third. Gurney may have been tempted to challenge for the lead again, but a slipping clutch caused him to think better of it.

With the track almost completely dry near the end of the race, Hill put his foot down and set the fastest lap of the afternoon on lap 105. He came home twelve seconds ahead for his second win of the year and the completion of a remarkable three-year run at The Glen. After the season, the Watkins Glen Grand Prix Corporation was awarded the Grand Prix Drivers Association's "Best Organized Race Award," the first of three times The Glen would receive the honor.

== Classification ==
=== Qualifying ===
Pos	No	Driver	Constructor	Time	Gap
1	3	(United Kingdom) Graham Hill	BRM	1:11.25	—
2	5	(United Kingdom) Jim Clark	Lotus-Climax	1:11.35	+0.10
3	11	(United States) Richie Ginther	Honda	1:11.40	+0.15
4	6	(United Kingdom) Mike Spence	Lotus-Climax	1:11.50	+0.25
5	2	(Italy) Lorenzo Bandini	Ferrari	1:11.73	+0.48
6	4	(United Kingdom) Jackie Stewart	BRM	1:11.76	+0.51
7	7	(Australia) Jack Brabham	Brabham-Climax	1:12.20	+0.95
8	8	(United States) Dan Gurney	Brabham-Climax	1:12.25	+1.00
9	9	(New Zealand) Bruce McLaren	Cooper-Climax	1:12.45	+1.20
10	15	(Sweden) Jo Bonnier	Brabham-Climax	1:12.45	+1.20
11	16	(Switzerland) Jo Siffert	Brabham-BRM	1:12.50	+1.25
12	12	(United States) Ronnie Bucknum	Honda	1:12.70	+1.45
13	10	(Austria) Jochen Rindt	Cooper-Climax	1:12.90	+1.65
14	24	(United States) Bob Bondurant	Ferrari	1:12.90	+1.65
15	14	(Mexico) Pedro Rodríguez	Ferrari	1:13.00	+1.75
16	21	(United Kingdom) Richard Attwood	Lotus-BRM	1:13.70	+2.45
17	18	(Mexico) Moisés Solana	Lotus-Climax	1:13.70	+2.45
18	22	(United Kingdom) Innes Ireland	Lotus-BRM	1:15.00	+3.75

=== Race ===
Pos	No	Driver	Constructor	Laps	Time/Retired	Grid	Points
1	3	(United Kingdom) Graham Hill	BRM	110	2:20:36.1	1	9
2	8	(United States) Dan Gurney	Brabham-Climax	110	+12.5 secs	8	6
3	7	(Australia) Jack Brabham	Brabham-Climax	110	+57.5 secs	7	4
4	2	(Italy) Lorenzo Bandini	Ferrari	109	+1 Lap	5	3
5	14	(Mexico) Pedro Rodríguez	Ferrari	109	+1 Lap	15	2
6	10	(Austria) Jochen Rindt	Cooper-Climax	108	+2 Laps	13	1
7	11	(United States) Richie Ginther	Honda	108	+2 Laps	3	
8	15	(Sweden) Jo Bonnier	Brabham-Climax	107	+3 Laps	10	
9	24	(United States) Bob Bondurant	Ferrari	106	+4 Laps	14	
10	21	(United Kingdom) Richard Attwood	Lotus-BRM	101	+9 Laps	16	
11	16	(Switzerland) Jo Siffert	Brabham-BRM	99	+11 Laps	11	
12	18	(Mexico) Moisés Solana	Lotus-Climax	95	+15 Laps	17	
13	12	(United States) Ronnie Bucknum	Honda	92	+18 Laps	12	
Ret	4	(United Kingdom) Jackie Stewart	BRM	12	Suspension	6	
Ret	5	(United Kingdom) Jim Clark	Lotus-Climax	11	Engine	2	
Ret	9	(New Zealand) Bruce McLaren	Cooper-Climax	11	Oil Pressure	9	
Ret	6	(United Kingdom) Mike Spence	Lotus-Climax	9	Engine	4	
Ret	22	(United Kingdom) Innes Ireland	Lotus-BRM	9	Unwell	18	

== Notes ==
- This was the Formula One World Championship debut race for American driver Bob Bondurant.
- This race marked the 99th and 100th podium finish for a Coventry Climax-powered car.

== Championship standings after the race ==
- **Bold text** indicates the World Champion.

Drivers' Championship standings

	Pos	Driver	Points
	1	(United Kingdom) **Jim Clark**	54
	2	(United Kingdom) Graham Hill	40 (47)
	3	(United Kingdom) Jackie Stewart	33 (34)
1	4	(United States) Dan Gurney	19
1	5	(United Kingdom) John Surtees	17

Constructors' Championship standings

Pos	Constructor	Points
1	(United Kingdom) Lotus-Climax	54
2	(United Kingdom) BRM	45 (61)
3	(Italy) Ferrari	26 (27)
4	(United Kingdom) Brabham-Climax	24 (25)
5	(United Kingdom) Cooper-Climax	14

- Notes: Only the top five positions are included for both sets of standings. Only best 6 results counted toward the championship. Numbers without parentheses are championship points, numbers in parentheses are total points scored.

Previous race: 1965 Italian Grand Prix	FIA Formula One World Championship; 1965 season	Next race: 1965 Mexican Grand Prix
Previous race: 1964 United States Grand Prix	United States Grand Prix	Next race: 1966 United States Grand Prix
