= Fernand Tavano =

French racing driver

Fernand Tavano (21 May 1933 – 6 July 1984) was a French racing driver.
