= Manfred Ramminger =

German KGB agent (1930–1997)

Manfred Ramminger (15 December 1930 - November 1997) was a German architect, playboy, and KGB agent. He is noted for his theft of an American AIM-9 Sidewinder Infrared homing air-to-air missile which he then brought to the Soviet Union.

== Background ==
Manfred Ramminger was born in Groß-Scharellen in East Prussia on 15 December 1930 to a bricklayer and his wife. His family fled the area in 1945 after the Soviet invasion of East Prussia, and settled in the town of Krefeld. After graduating high school, Ramminger studied engineering with minor success, being involved in a small construction company in the 1950s before his partner left the business.

Ramminger also had a reputation for being a playboy. He was known for driving a blue Maserati race car, winning a dozen trophies in various races, and having a possible affair with a married woman.

== Theft of the Sidewinder ==
In 1951, Polish locksmith and concentration camp survivor Josef Linowski (or Linowsky) was living in West Germany. While visiting family in Poland, he was recruited by the Polish Ministry of Public Security. He then recruited Ramminger as well as Wolf-Diethardt Knoppe, who had been a West German military pilot since 1956.

Linowski was given a number of tasks by his superiors. He was first ordered to steal a Litton LM-II navigation box from the Neuburg Air Base, and later to steal a Phantom aircraft. Realizing the difficulty of such a task, Linowski decided instead to steal a Sidewinder missile.

On 22 October 1967, the trio entered the Neuburg base with Knoppe's base security pass, taking advantage of the thick fog that evening. They identified the missile in an ammunition depot and put it in a wheelbarrow, driving down the entire runway before placing it in Ramminger's Mercedes sedan outside the base. It was too big to lay flat, so Ramminger broke the rear window to poke it through. To avoid police attention, he covered the missile with a carpet and noted the protrusion with a piece of red cloth, which was required by law.

Returning to Krefeld, some 200 miles away, Ramminger dismantled and packed the missile for Moscow through airmail. Due to the extra weight, the shipping costs came out to $79.25. The crate was to be flown directly to Moscow, with Ramminger boarding the same plane. However, due to an error, the crates were returned to Düsseldorf. Ramminger had to fly back to Germany and redeem the packages before boarding the next flight to the Soviet Union.

Ramminger and his aides were arrested by West German authorities in 1968 after Knoppe boasted about the heist while drunk in a bar. Ramminger and Linowski were sentenced to four years in prison, and Knoppe was sentenced to three years and three months on 7 October 1970. However, Ramminger was released in August 1971 in a prisoner swap for Western spies.
