= David Piper =

David Piper may refer to

- Sir David Piper (curator) (1918–1990), British curator and author
- David Piper (racing driver) (born 1930), British Formula One driver
