= Bob Bondurant =

American racing driver (1933–2021)

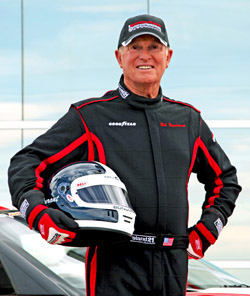
- Bondurant in 2012
- Born: Robert Lewis Bondurant; April 27, 1933; Evanston, Illinois, U.S.
- Died: November 12, 2021 (aged 88); Paradise Valley, Arizona, U.S.

Formula One World Championship career
- Active years: 1965–1966
- Team(s): North American Racing Team, Reg Parnell Racing, non-works BRM, Eagle
- Entries: 9
- Championships: 0
- Wins: 0
- Podiums: 0
- Career points: 3
- Pole positions: 0
- Fastest laps: 0
- First entry: 1965 United States Grand Prix
- Last entry: 1966 Mexican Grand Prix

Robert Lewis Bondurant (April 27, 1933 – November 12, 2021) was an American racecar driver who raced for the Shelby American, Ferrari, and Eagle teams. Bondurant was one of the most famous drivers to emerge from the Southern California road racing scene in the 1950s, and achieved success in North America and in Europe. His Bob Bondurant School of High Performance Driving was responsible for training generations of American racing drivers.

== Career ==
Bondurant was born in Evanston, Illinois. During his teens, Bondurant raced an Indian motorcycle on dirt ovals. In 1956, he switched to sports car racing with a Morgan and started to attract attention when he won the West Coast "B" production Championship, in a Chevrolet Corvette winning eighteen out of twenty races.

Santa Barbara Chevrolet dealer Shelly Washburn hired Bondurant in 1961 to drive his #614 1959 Corvette. Some of the best Corvette racing duels were between him and David McDonald on the West Coast during the early 1960s. At the L.A. Times Grand Prix in October 1962, Bondurant drove Washburn's new 1963 Corvette Z06 Stingray. Between 1961 and 1963, he won thirty out of 32 races in Washburn's Corvettes.

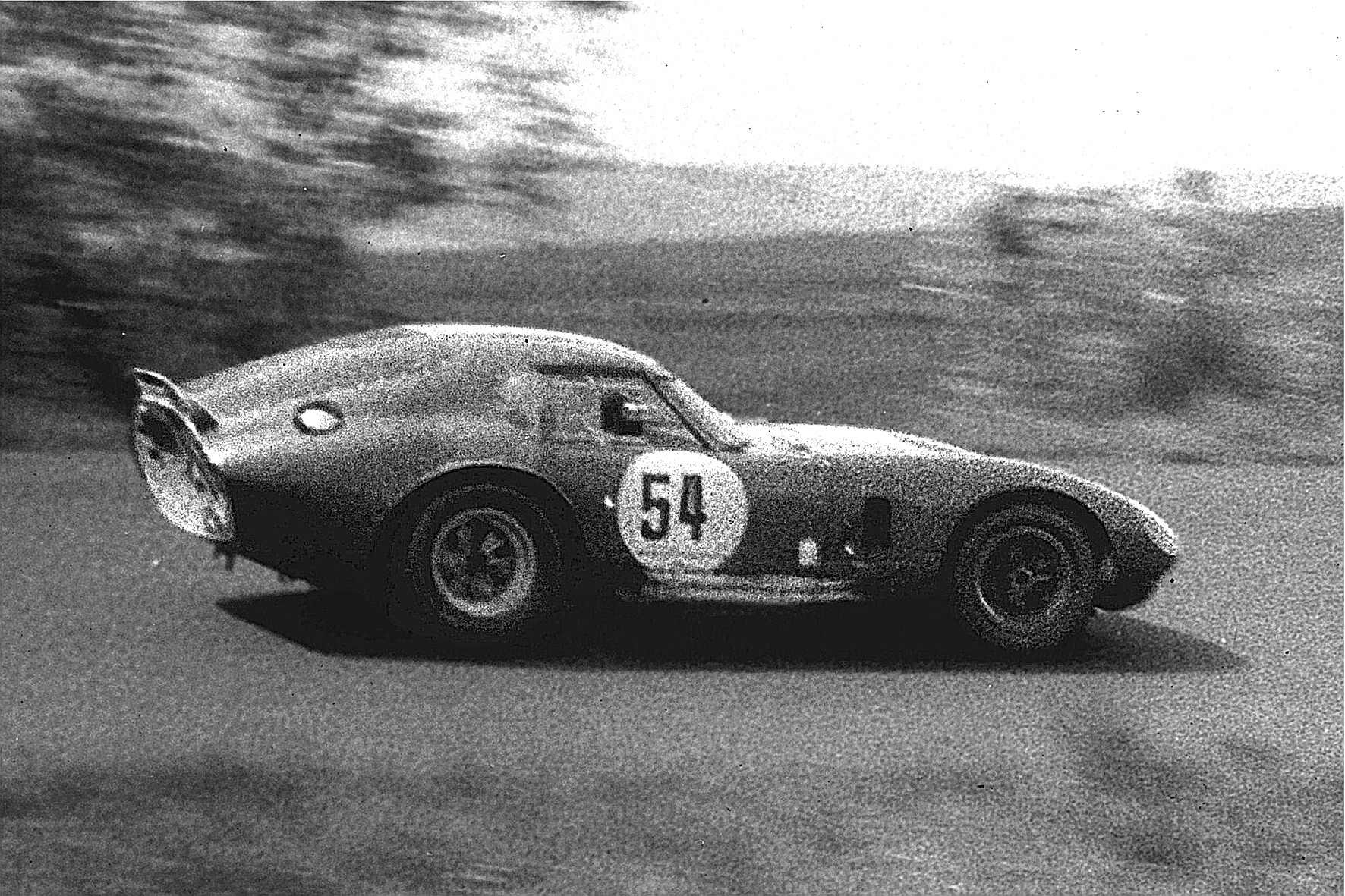
The Shelby Daytona Coupé driven by Bondurant and Jochen Neerpasch at the 1965 Nürburgring 1000 km

In 1963, he became a member of Carroll Shelby's Ford Cobra team, winning his first race at the Continental Divide Raceway in Colorado, followed by an overall win at the LA Times Grand Prix GT race at Riverside in October 1963. For the 1964 FIA season after finishing second in GT at Sebring, Bondurant was in Europe racing the new 289 FIA Cobras at the Targa Florio, Spa, and Nurburgring. His best-known victory was winning the GT class at Le Mans 24 Hours in 1964 in Shelby's new Cobra Daytona Coupe with Dan Gurney co-driving. In 1965, Bondurant won the FIA Manufacturers' World Championship for Shelby American and Ford, winning seven out of ten races against the class dominating Ferrari 250 GTOs in Europe. In the same year, he drove a works Ferrari Formula 1 car during the United States Grand Prix at Watkins Glen, and handled a Lotus 33 for Reg Parnell at the following Mexican race.

In 1966, Bondurant served as a technical consultant for John Frankenheimer's film Grand Prix and trained the film's lead actor James Garner to drive Formula cars in the race sequences. Bondurant was one of two drivers (alongside Graham Hill) to help extricate Jackie Stewart from his fuel-leaking wrecked car during the 1966 Belgian Grand Prix, the incident that led to Stewart's crusade for motor racing safety. Bondurant also drove BRMs in five Grands Prix for Team Chamaco Collect, finishing fourth at Monaco. He finished the Formula One season in North America in two races, driving an Eagle for Dan Gurney's Anglo American Racers.

For 1967, Bondurant drove in the CanAm series and in a Corvette L88 Coupe at Le Mans. At Le Mans he led the GT class until a wrist pin failed putting the car out in the early morning. Later that month while driving a McLaren, at Watkins Glen, the steering arm broke at 150 mph approaching the Loop-Chute section of Watkins Glen (the current Turn 5, but without the bus stop, which was installed in 1992). Bondurant sustained serious rib, leg, foot and, most seriously, back injuries in the subsequent accident in which his car flipped eight times. Doctors told him he would likely never walk again, but through courage and hard work he overcame his injuries.

While recuperating, Bondurant drafted an idea for a high performance driving school borrowing from the experiences he had while training James Garner for Grand Prix. The Bob Bondurant School of High Performance Driving opened in early 1968 at Orange County International Raceway then moved to Ontario and then to Sonoma, where he was an important figure in the track's development. Nissan Motor Company (under Datsun name in the U.S.) was Bondurant's sponsoring partner in his school from its beginning, and continued in that role at the Sonoma Raceway driving school.

In the June 1969 run of the grueling offroad Baja 500 race, Bondurant with co-driver Tony Murphy took first place in the passenger car class driving an SC/Rambler for James Garner's "American International Racers" team that was sponsored by American Motors Corporation (AMC).

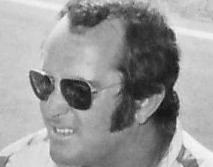
Bondurant in 1972

Bondurant had four NASCAR starts, all at Riverside International Raceway, with his highest finish of eighteenth in 1981.

Following the 1989 Loma Prieta earthquake, Bondurant moved the driving school to Phoenix, Arizona, where he enjoyed close ties to General Motors and Goodyear Tires.

Bondurant was a driving instructor to actors James Garner, Paul Newman, Clint Eastwood, Robert Wagner, Tim Allen, Tom Cruise, and Nicolas Cage.

== Awards ==
- Bondurant was inducted in the Motorsports Hall of Fame of America in 2003.
- He was inducted in the West Coast Stock Car Hall of Fame in 2014.

== Death ==
Bondurant died in Paradise Valley, Arizona, on November 12, 2021, at the age of 88. He is survived by his wife Pat.

A statement on his death reads, in part, "Bondurant is the only American to bring home the World Championship trophy back to the U.S. while racing for Carroll Shelby. He won his class at Le Mans and has been inducted into ten motorsports halls of fame. Bondurant Racing School was founded in 1968 and has graduated celebrities for car movies like James Garner, Paul Newman, Tom Cruise, Nicolas Cage, and Christian Bale, along with over 500,000 graduates from around the world. His legacy will remain with us forever."

== Racing record ==
=== SCCA National Championship Runoffs ===
Year	Track	Car	Engine	Class	Finish	Start	Status
1977	Road Atlanta	Chevrolet Camaro		American Sedan	6	8	Running

=== Complete Formula One World Championship results ===
(key)

Year	Entrant	Chassis	Engine	1	2	3	4	5	6	7	8	9	10	WDC	Points
1965	North American Racing Team	Ferrari 158	Ferrari V8	RSA	MON	BEL	FRA	GBR	NED	GER	ITA	USA; 9		NC	0
1965	Reg Parnell (Racing)	Lotus 33	Climax V8										MEX; Ret	NC	0
1966	Team Chamaco Collect	BRM P261	BRM V8	MON; 4	BEL; Ret	FRA	GBR; 9	NED	GER; Ret	ITA; 7				14th	3
1966	Anglo American Racers	Eagle T1F	Climax Straight-4								USA; DSQ			14th	3
1966	Anglo American Racers	Eagle T1G	Weslake V12									MEX; Ret		14th	3

=== Formula One Non-Championship results ===
(key) (Races in bold indicate pole position; races in italics indicate fastest lap)

Year	Entrant	Chassis	Engine	1	2	3	4	5	6	7	8
1971	Competition Developments	Lola T192 (F5000)	Chevrolet V8	ARG	ROC	QUE; 25	SPR	INT	RIN	OUL	VIC

=== Complete 24 Hours of Le Mans results ===
Year	Team	Co-Drivers	Car	Class	Laps	Pos.	Class Pos.
1964	(United States) Shelby-American Inc.	(United States) Dan Gurney	Shelby Cobra Daytona	GT +3.0	334	4th	**1st**
1965	(United Kingdom) R.R.C. Walker Racing Team (United States) Shelby-American Inc.	(Italy) Umberto Maglioli	Ford GT40 Mk.I	P 5.0	29	DNF	DNF
1966	(United States) North American Racing Team (NART)	(United States) Masten Gregory	Ferrari 365 P2	P 5.0	88	DNF	DNF
1967	(United States) Dana Chevrolet Inc.	(United States) Dick Guldstrand	Chevrolet Corvette (C2)	GT +5.0	167	DNF	DNF
