= George Arents III =

American racing driver (1916–1992)

George Arents III or George Arents Jr. (21 April 1916 – 30 May 1992) was an American racing driver. He was also openly homosexual, and despite having a wife and children, was in a relationship with fellow racing driver David Cunningham.
