= Top Gear series 14 =

Top Gear
- Series 14
- Promotional poster
- Starring: Jeremy Clarkson; Richard Hammond; James May; The Stig
- No. of episodes: 7

Release
- Original network: BBC Two; BBC HD
- Original release: 15 November 2009 – 3 January 2010

Series chronology
- ← Previous; Series 13 Next → Series 15

Series 14 of Top Gear, a British motoring magazine and factual television programme, was broadcast in the United Kingdom on BBC Two, consisting of seven episodes that were aired between 15 November 2009 to 3 January 2010. It is the first series that was also aired in high-definition. This series' highlights included the presenters making their own electric car, hosting a car-themed art exhibition, and a tribute to the car manufacturer Lancia. The sixth episode of the series was dedicated to a feature-length special, titled Top Gear: Bolivia Special, focused on a road trip with off-road vehicles.

A series of compilation episodes featuring the best moments of the thirteenth and fourteenth series, titled "Best of Top Gear", was aired during 2010 between 10 January to 7 February. The fourteenth series faced criticism for its feature film in the first episode, regarding comments considered unacceptable to Romanians.

== Episodes ==
No. overall	No. in series	Reviews	Features/challenges	Guest(s)	Original release date	UK viewers (millions)
113	1	BMW 760Li • Mercedes-Benz S63 AMG	Romanian GT road trip to find the Transfăgărăşan highway: (Aston Martin DBS Volante • Ferrari California • Lamborghini Gallardo LP560-4 Spyder • Dacia Sandero)	Eric Bana; Vernon Kay (voice only)	15 November 2009	6.70 (Note: 6.41 million on BBC Two, 286,000 on BBC HD)
The trio have had a disagreement about which is the best GT Car and so have headed for Romania, for a road trip to see if their choice is the best - Clarkson says it is the Aston Martin DBS Volante, Hammond claims it is the Ferrari California, and May reckons it is the Lamborghini Gallardo LP560-4 Spyder. Along this trip, they have a Sat-Nav race to the People's Palace and make use of the tunnels under it, visit a Romanian village, camp in their cars, before finally heading into the mountains to visit a road that could be the best in the world and better than the one they found previously - the Transfăgărăşan Highway. Meanwhile, May road tests the BMW 760Li and the Mercedes-Benz S63 AMG to see which is best for some bankers with money, while Australian actor Eric Bana is the latest star in the Lacetti.
114	2	Audi R8 V10 • Chevrolet Corvette ZR1	Build an electric car better than a G-Wiz	Michael Sheen	22 November 2009	6.48 (Note: 6.19 million on BBC Two, 285,000 on BBC HD)
None of the presenters think that the G-Wiz is a good electric car, so they decide to attempt to build their own which is much better. With Hammond taking on the car's chassis, suspension and brakes, May dealing with the power and propulsion, and Clarkson designing the interior and exterior, their initial creation is tested around Oxford and soon causes mayhem. With a re-think and given the name of the "Hammerhead Eagle i-Thrust", the presenters take it to the MIRA Proving Ground and try pass the EU-required tests needed to make a car road legal (with a little cheating) before giving it to Autocar magazine for an independent test. Meanwhile, Clarkson reviews the brilliant yet serious V10-engined Audi R8, and the exciting yet grossly impractical Chevrolet Corvette ZR1, while Welsh actor Michael Sheen flies in from Los Angeles to do a lap in the reasonably priced car.
115	3	Lamborghini Gallardo LP550-2 Valentino Balboni • Hawk HF3000	Fly an Airship caravan with a Lamborghini Gallardo LP550-2 Valentino Balboni • Why Lancia has made greatest number of great cars	Chris Evans	29 November 2009	6.51 (Note: 6.10 million on BBC Two, 412,000 on BBC HD)
Top Gear always hates caravans and tries to destroy them as fast as they are made, so May proposes an ingenious solution to rid them from Britain's roads once and for all - turning them into airships. As he takes his proposed creation on a trip through the skies, Hammond heads off to the caravan site he is heading for, with a much better car to have on a caravanning holiday - the new Lamborghini Gallardo LP550-2 Valentino Balboni. Elsewhere, Hammond and Clarkson have a look at some of the great cars made by the former car company Lancia before Clarkson tries out the Hawk HF3000, a continuation car of the Lancia Stratos, and radio DJ and presenter, Chris Evans, discusses his car history and his lap in the Lacetti.
116	4	Off Roaders: (BMW X5 M • Audi Q7 V12 TDI • Range Rover (2010MY)) • Renault Twingo 133	Airport vehicle motorsport	Guy Ritchie • Ross Kemp	6 December 2009	6.29 (Note: 6.09 million on BBC Two, 196,000 on BBC HD)
Clarkson is testing out the Audi Q7 V12 TDI, the BMW X5 M and a new Range Rover (2010MY) to find which he loves best, before dealing with another letter demanding another "thorough" road test by heading to Belfast and seeing how good the Renaultsport Twingo 133 is. Meanwhile, Hammond is at "Heathrow" to solve the problems caused by slow airport staff, to see if motorsport and a group of touring drivers can find out whether a catering truck, the mobile stairs, an articulated shuttle bus, a baggage train, an aircraft tug or an airport fire truck will become the basis for all airport vehicles in future, while filmmaker Guy Ritchie is on the test track as the latest star to get around it in the Lacetti. Note: The 'Airport Motorsport' film was originally intended for Series 13, but was postponed to this episode for unknown reasons.
117	5	Noble M600	Make an automotive art gallery to prove cars are more popular than traditional art	Jenson Button • David Coulthard • Rupert Maas • Stephen Wiltshire	20 December 2009	6.90 (Note: 6.35 million on BBC Two, 550,000 on BBC HD)
The presenters take over the MIMA gallery in Middlesbrough for an exhibition of car-themed artwork, to prove they are art. Alongside picking several pieces, each attempts to make their own piece of art in different ways, and their own BMW "art car", before working hard to ensure everyone they can will attend their exhibition in order to achieve a target of 30,000 visitors. Elsewhere, Clarkson reviews the very fast Noble M600 on the track, and Jenson Button returns for another go in the Liana to see if he can beat his previous time.
118	6	N/A – Bolivia Special	Bolivia Special: (Range Rover • Toyota Land Cruiser • Suzuki Samurai)	None	27 December 2009	7.45 (Note: 7.07 million on BBC Two, 378,000 on BBC HD)
In an attempt to see which is the best 4x4 off-road vehicle in the world, the presenters take themselves on a journey across 1,000 miles (1,600 km), from the rainforests of Bolivia to the Pacific coast of Chile, with each buying a second-hand 4x4 off-roader from the Bolivian classifieds, within a budget of £3,500 - Clarkson thinks it is the Range Rover he bought that has the engine he did not expect it had, May feels the Suzuki Samurai he purchased is the one despite being in red and not blue, and Hammond believes it is the Toyota Land Cruiser he found despite the amateur attempt by someone to make it a convertible. On their journey, the trio face deadly insects and tough rainforest undergrowth, make a tricky crossing over a gully and a river, the most dangerous road in the world, the El Camino de la Muerte (Death Road), climb up into freezing, thin altitudes, and make a descent down a steep sand dune towards their final destination.
119	7	Lexus LFA • BMW X6 • Vauxhall Insignia VXR	'Low-budget' worldwide review of the BMW X6 • May and Margaret Calvert reflect on the evolution of UK road signs • Top Gear Awards 2009	Seasick Steve	3 January 2010	6.52 (Note: 6.05 million on BBC Two, 472,000 on BBC HD)
The presenters are faced with a serious problem - they were budgeted for fourteen episodes, but have spent too much on the first thirteen, and thus have to be careful with how much they spend for this episode. However, Hammond wastes quite a bit with animated graphics as he takes a drive in the £340,000 Lexus LFA, while Clarkson spends a lot travelling to Spain, France, Hong Kong, Australia, and Barbados, to see how bad the BMW X6 is, leaving May with virtually nothing as he reviews the Vauxhall Insignia VXR and meets with road sign designer Margaret Calvert. Elsewhere, the 2009 Top Gear Awards are announced, and American musician, Seasick Steve, becomes the last star to take on the Lacetti.

=== Best-of episodes ===
Total	No.	Title	Feature	Original air date	UK viewers (million)
S18	CE–1	"The Best of Top Gear: 2009 No.1"	Best Moments from Series 13-14 - Part 1	10 January 2010	3.12
A look back at some of the best moments from Series 13 and 14, including the race between the Bugatti Veyron and the McLaren F1, and the trio's 1940s race between the car, bike and train.
S19	CE–2	"The Best of Top Gear: 2009 No.2"	Best Moments from Series 13-14 - Part 2	24 January 2010	2.37
A second look back at some of the best moments from Series 13 and 14, including the presenters GT road trip across Romania.
S20	CE–3	"The Best of Top Gear: 2009 No.3"	Best Moments from Series 13-14 - Part 3	31 January 2010	2.08
A third look back at some of the best moments from Series 13 and 14, including a reminder of some of the great cars that Lancia made.
S21	CE–4	"The Best of Top Gear: 2009 No.4"	Best Moments from Series 13-14 - Part 4	7 February 2010	2.25
A fourth look back at some of the bets moments from Series 13 and 14, including the presenters' efforts to make a better electric car than the G-Wiz.

== Criticism ==
Several Romanian newspapers criticised the comments made by Jeremy Clarkson in the fourteenth series' first episode, designed as a reference to the 2006 mockumentary that starred Sacha Baron Cohen as his fictional journalist character from Kazakhstan, with comments that Romania was "Borat country, with gypsies and Russian playboys". Because the film had already stirred controversy in the country, with a number of local Roma who had been involved in the film attempting to sue 20th Century Fox and Cohen, it was claimed that the comments had been "offensive" and had produced "bad publicity for their country", with the Romanian Times also reporting that Clarkson had called Romania a "gypsy land".

Further complaints were also made in regards to a scene in which Clarkson donned a pork pie hat and called it a "gypsy" hat, while commenting: "I'm wearing this hat so the gypsies think I am [another gypsy]." Following the episode, the Romanian ambassador sent a letter to the producers of Top Gear, in which he showed his appreciation for the show, highlighted the press's freedom of expression, the non-discriminatory spirit, and the fact that 89.5% of the country's population is Romanian, 6.5% is ethnic Hungarians, 2.5% are ethnic Roma and 1.5% are other ethnic groups, but asked that the episode be re-edited to exclude the offensive material in future showings. In another response to the episode after its broadcast, a group of Romanians hacked over two pages of the Daily Telegraph website, covering them in Romanian flags and playing Gheorghe Zamfir - Lonely Shepherd (featured on the soundtrack to the film Kill Bill) while stating:

"We are sick of being mis-represented as Gypsies, and thanks to Top Gear, have been publicly insulted."

== Notes ==
The viewing figures shown in the Episode Table above, are a combination of the figures from the BBC Two broadcast and the BBC HD broadcast.
