= Ford GT40 =

High-performance endurance racing car

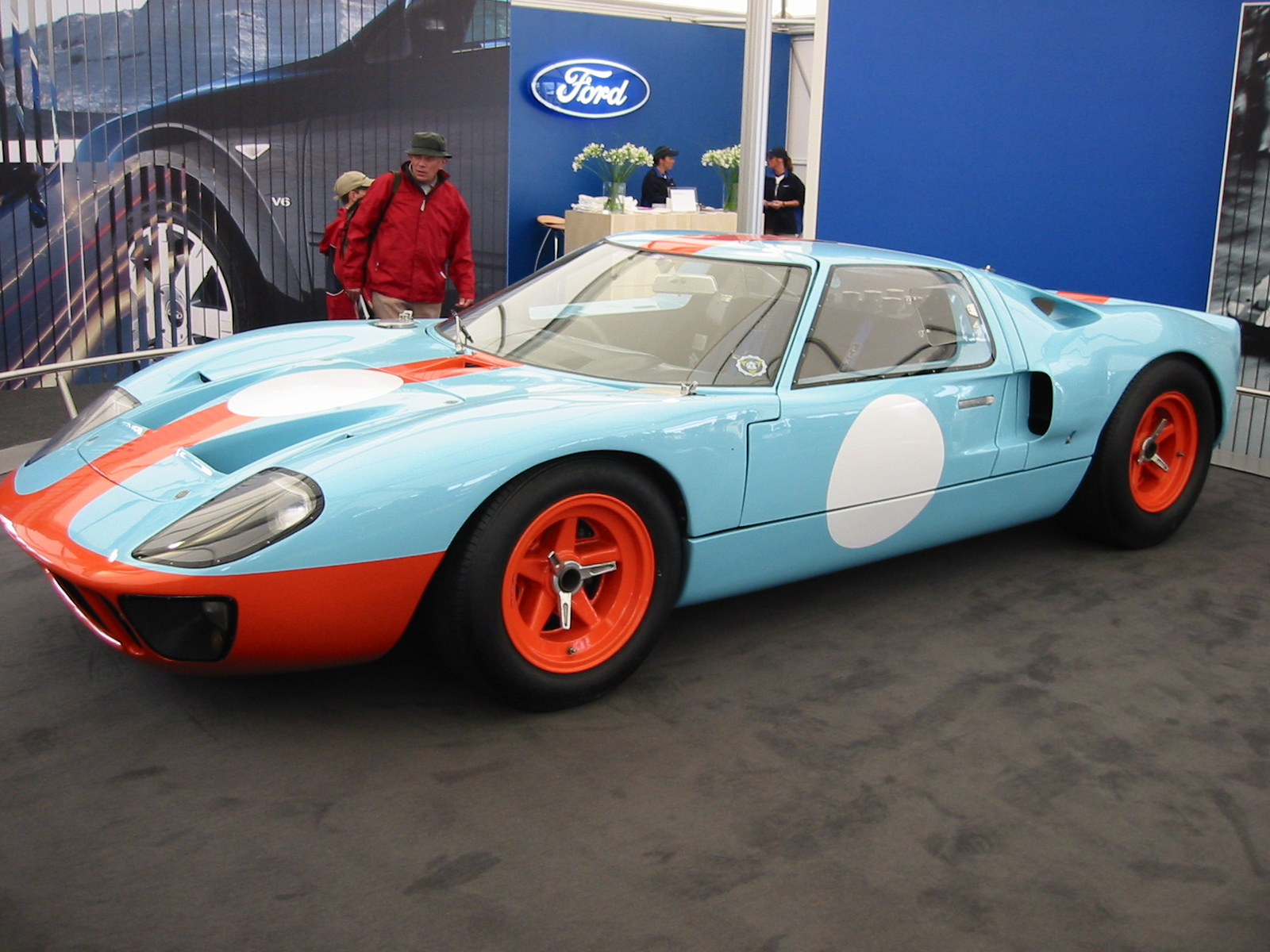
- Ford GT40 Mk.I in JWA Gulf Oil racing colors

Overview
- Manufacturer: Ford Advanced Vehicles; John Wyer Automotive Engineering; Kar Kraft; Holman-Moody; Shelby American
- Production: 1964–1969; 105 produced
- Assembly: United Kingdom: Slough (Mk I, Mk II, and Mk III); United States: Los Angeles (Mk I & Mk II Modifications) and Wixom, Michigan (Wixom Assembly Plant: Mk IV)
- Designer: Ron Bradshaw

Body and chassis
- Class: Group 4 sports car Group 5 sports car Group 6 sports prototype
- Body style: 2-door coupé 2-door roadster
- Layout: MR layout

Powertrain
- Engine: 255 CID (4181 cc) V-8; 289 CID (4737 cc) V-8; 302 CID (4942 cc) V-8; 427 CID (6997 cc) V-8
- Transmission: Mk1 & Mk3: 5-speed manual Mk2 & Mk4: 4-speed manual

Dimensions
- Wheelbase: 95 in (2,413 mm)
- Length: 160 in (4,064 mm)
- Width: 70 in (1,778 mm)
- Height: 40.5 in (1,029 mm)
- Kerb weight: 1,800–2,300 lb (816–1,043 kg) (1966, Mk IIA)

Chronology
- Predecessor: Lola Mk6
- Successor: Ford P68 (racing); Ford GT (street)

The Ford GT40 is a high-performance mid-engined racing car originally designed and built for and by the Ford Motor Company to compete in 1960s European endurance racing and the World Sportscar Championship. Its specific impetus was to beat Scuderia Ferrari, which had won the prestigious 24 Hours of Le Mans race for six years running from 1960 to 1965. As rules of the time required that GT cars were built in dozens and sold, around 100 cars in total have been made, mostly as 289 cu in (4.7 L) V8-powered Mk Is, of which at least 50 were made in 1965, which allowed FIA-homologation as a Group 4 sportscar for 1966 until 1971.

The Ford GT40 debuted in 1964, and improvements in 1965 led to Ford winning World Championships categories from 1966 to 1968. The first Le Mans win came in 1966 with three 427 cu in (7.0 L) powered Mk.II prototypes crossing the finish line together, the second in 1967 with the same engine now in quite different US-built Mk.IV prototype chassis similar to the "J-car" mule. In order to lower ever-higher race top speeds, a rule change from 1968 onwards limited prototypes to 3.0 litre Formula 1 engines; however the sportscar "loophole" allowed the private JW "Gulf Oil" team to win at Le Mans in 1968 and 1969 running a Mk.I with a 5.0 litre engine.

The GT40 effort began in Britain in the early 1960s when Ford Advanced Vehicles began to build the Mk I, based upon the British Lola Mk6, in Slough, UK. After disappointing race results, the engineering team was moved in 1964 to Dearborn, Michigan, US, to design and build cars by its advanced developer, Kar Kraft. All chassis versions were powered by a series of American-built Ford V8 OHV engines modified for racing.

In the 1966 Le Mans, the GT40 Mk II car broke Ferrari's winning streak, making Ford the first American manufacturer to win a major European race since Jimmy Murphy's Duesenberg in the 1921 French Grand Prix. In the 1967 Le Mans, the GT40 Mk IV car became the only car developed and assembled entirely (both chassis and engine) in the United States to achieve the overall win at Le Mans and this victory also remains the only all-American victory in Le Mans history — American drivers (Dan Gurney and A. J. Foyt), team (Shelby-American Inc.), chassis constructor (Ford), engine manufacturer (Ford), and tires (Goodyear).

== Name ==
The "GT" in the car's name stands for grand touring, and the "40" its height in inches (1.02 m) measured at the top of the windscreen, the minimum allowed. The first 12 "prototype" vehicles carried serial numbers GT-101 to GT-112. Production GT40s (Mk I, Mk II, Mk III, and Mk IV) began with GT40P/1000.

== History ==
Henry Ford II had wanted a Ford at Le Mans since the early 1960s. In early 1963, Ford reportedly received word through a European intermediary that Enzo Ferrari was interested in selling to Ford Motor Company. Ford reportedly spent several million dollars in an audit of Ferrari factory assets and in legal negotiations, only to have Ferrari unilaterally cut off talks at a late stage due to disputes about the ability to direct open-wheel racing. Ferrari, who wanted to remain the sole operator of his company's motorsports division, was angered when he was told that he would not be allowed to race at the Indianapolis 500 again (Ferrari had raced at the '52 Indy) if the deal went through, since Ford fielded Lotus 29 cars with the new Ford Indy V8 engine and didn't want competition from Ferrari. Enzo cut the deal off out of spite and Henry Ford II, enraged, directed his racing division to find a company that could build a Ferrari-beater on the world endurance-racing Gran Turismo circuit.

To this end, Ford began negotiation with Lotus, Lola, and Cooper. Cooper had no experience in GT or prototype and its performances in Formula One were declining as others also used the rear-mid engine layout.

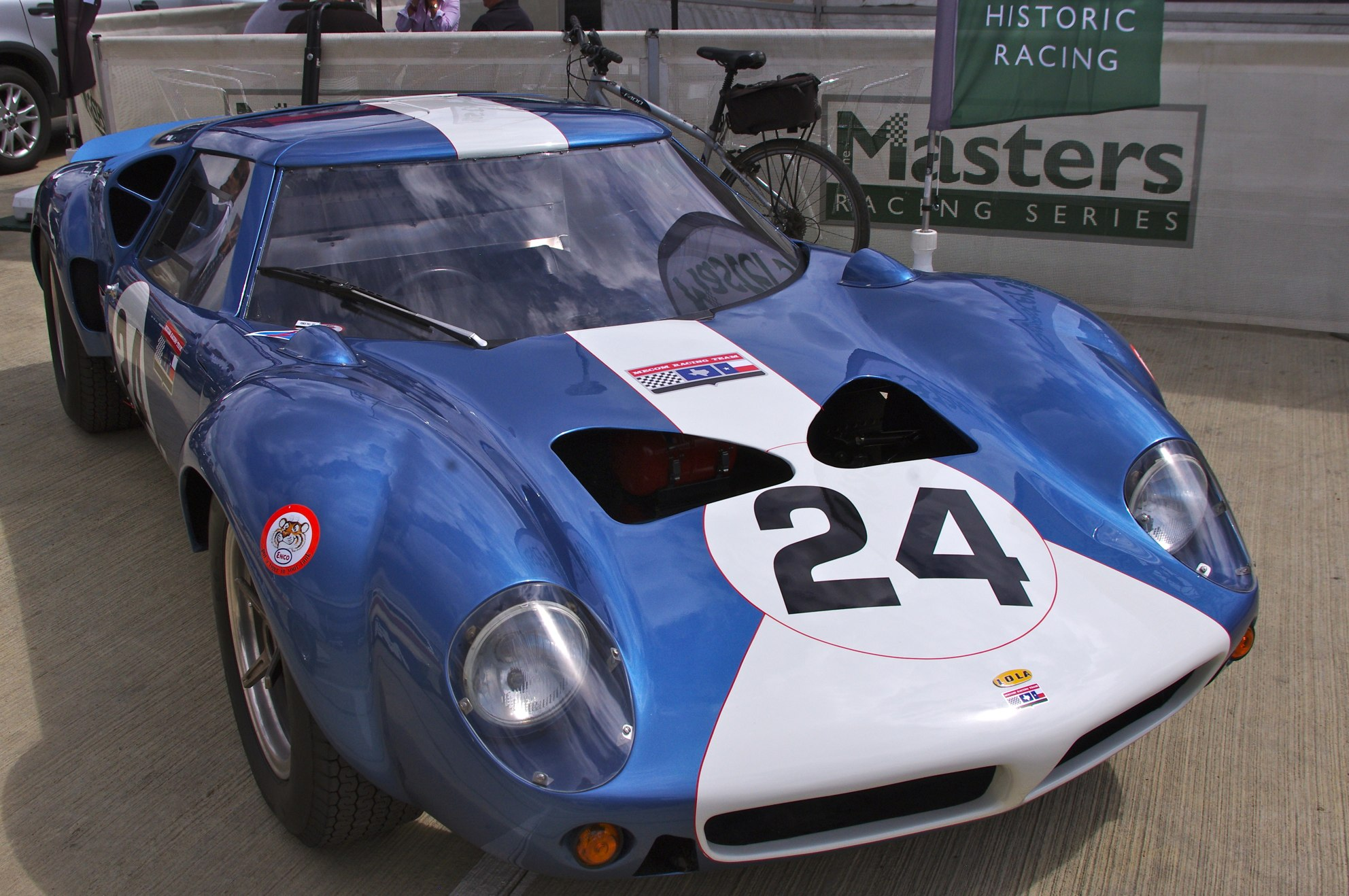
The Lola Mk6 that the GT40 was developed from

The Lola proposal was chosen since Lola had used a Ford V8 engine in its mid-engined Lola Mk6 (also known as Lola GT). It was one of the most advanced racing cars of the time and made a noted performance in Le Mans 1963, even though the car did not finish, due to low gearing and slow revving out on the Mulsanne Straight. However, Eric Broadley, Lola Cars' owner and chief designer, agreed on a short-term personal contribution to the project without involving Lola Cars.

The agreement with Broadley included a one-year collaboration between Ford and Broadley, and the sale of the two Lola Mk 6 chassis builds to Ford. To form the development team, Ford also hired the ex-Aston Martin team manager John Wyer. Ford Motor Co. engineer Roy Lunn was sent to England; he had designed the mid-engined Mustang I concept car, making him the only Dearborn engineer to have some experience with that configuration.

Overseen by Harley Copp, the team of Broadley, Lunn, and Wyer began working on the new car at the Lola Factory in Bromley. At the end of 1963, the team moved to Slough, near Heathrow Airport. Ford then established Ford Advanced Vehicles (FAV) Ltd, a new subsidiary under the direction of Wyer, to manage the project.

The first chassis built by Abbey Panels of Coventry was delivered on 16 March 1964, with fibreglass mouldings produced by Fibre Glass Engineering Ltd of Farnham. The first "Ford GT" the GT/101 was unveiled in England on 1 April and soon after exhibited in New York. Purchase price of the completed car for competition use was £5,200.

It was powered by the 4.7 L HiPo (K-code) 289 cu in Fairlane engine with a Colotti transaxle. An aluminium block DOHC version, known as the Ford Indy V8 engine, won the 1965 Indianapolis 500 and in later years.

=== Racing history '64-'65 ===
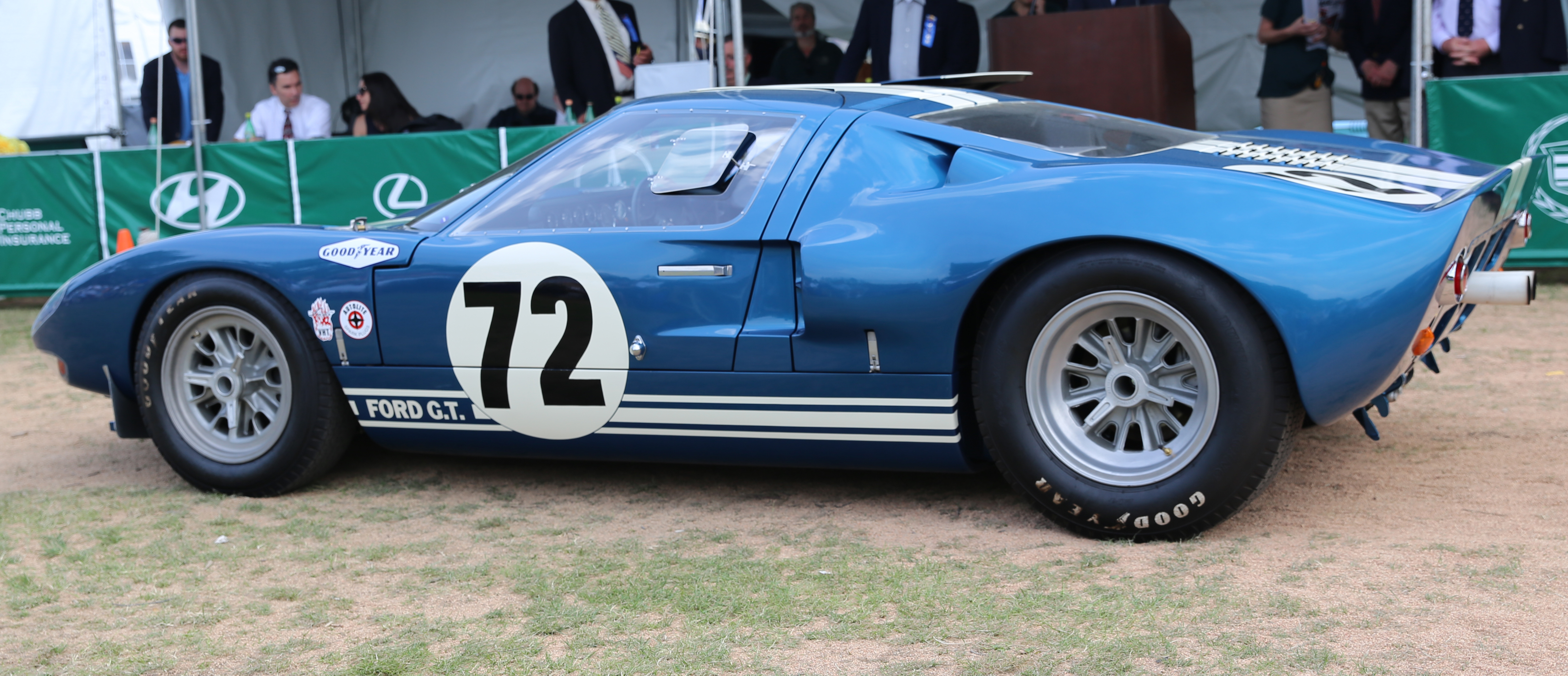
Prototype chassis GT 104, which finished third at the Daytona 2000 in 1965

The Ford GT40 was first raced in May 1964 at the Nürburgring 1000 km where it retired with suspension failure after holding second place early in the event. Three weeks later at the 1964 24 Hours of Le Mans, all three entries retired, although the Ginther/Gregory car led the field from the second lap until its first pitstop. After a season-long series of dismal results under John Wyer in 1964, the program was handed over to Carroll Shelby after the 1964 Nassau race. The cars were sent directly to Shelby, still bearing the dirt and damage from the Nassau race. Carroll Shelby was noted for complaining that the cars were poorly maintained when he received them, but later information revealed the cars were packed up as soon as the race was over, and FAV never had a chance to clean and organize the cars to be transported to Shelby.

Shelby's first victory came on their maiden race with the Ford program, with Ken Miles and Lloyd Ruby taking a Shelby American-entered Ford GT40 to victory in the Daytona 2000km in February 1965. One month later, Ken Miles and Bruce McLaren came in second overall (to the winning Chaparral in the sports class) and first in prototype class at the Sebring 12-hour race. The rest of the season, however, was a disappointment.

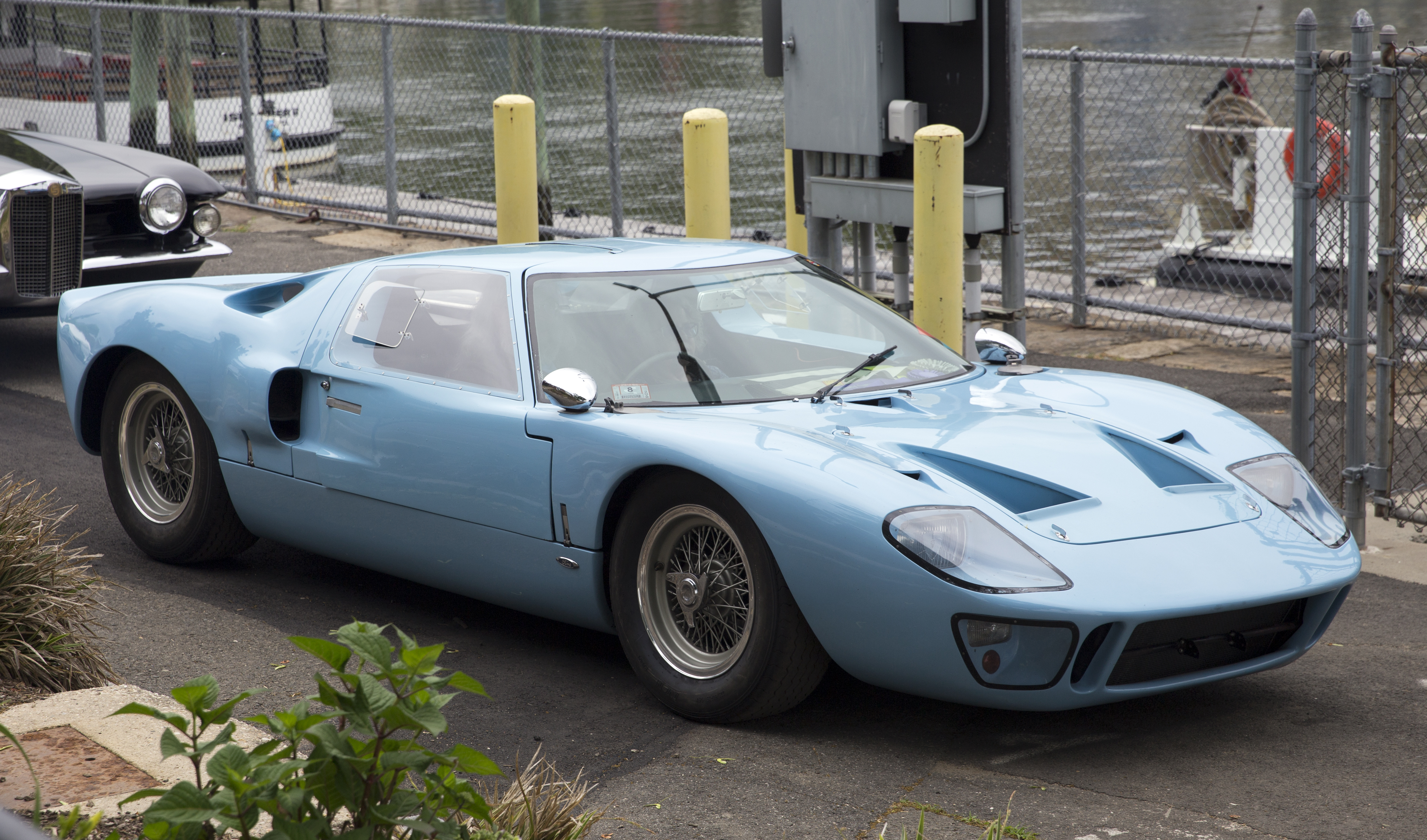
GT40 Mk I (chassis P/1030), later modified by Ford Advanced Vehicles in August 1967 to be street legal

=== Racing history '66-'67 ===
The experience gained in 1964 and 1965 allowed the 7-liter Mk II prototypes to dominate the following years. In addition, as more than 50 had been built, the 4.7 litre Mk.I was homologated as Group 4 Sportscar, and privateers could challenge for wins in the S 5.0 class, earning championship points for Ford in the 1966 World Sportscar Championship International Sports Car Championship Division III (Over 2000cc).

In February, the GT40 again won at Daytona. This was the first year Daytona was run in the 24 hour format and Mk II's finished 1st, 2nd, and 3rd. In March, at the 1966 12 Hours of Sebring, GT40s again took all three top finishes, with the X-1 Roadster first, a Mk II taking second, and a Mk I in third. Then in June, at the 24 Hours of Le Mans, the GT40 achieved the desired Le Mans victory, with yet another 1–2–3 result.

The "orchestrated" Le Mans finish, however, was clouded in controversy: The No1 car of Ken Miles and Denny Hulme held a four lap lead over the No2 car of Bruce McLaren and Chris Amon. This disintegrated when the No1 car was forced to make a pit-stop for replacement brake rotors, following an incorrect set being fitted a lap prior in a scheduled rotor change. It was found to be a result of the correct brake rotors being taken by the No2 crew. This meant that in the final few hours, the Ford GT40 of New Zealanders Bruce McLaren and Chris Amon closely trailed the leading Ford GT40 driven by Englishman Ken Miles and New Zealander Denny Hulme. With a multimillion-dollar program finally on the very brink of success, Ford team officials faced a difficult choice. They could allow the drivers to settle the outcome by racing each other—and risk one or both cars breaking down or crashing; they could dictate a finishing order to the drivers—guaranteeing that one set of drivers would be extremely unhappy; or they could arrange a tie, with the McLaren/Amon and Miles/Hulme cars crossing the line side by side.

The team chose the latter and informed Shelby. He told McLaren and Miles of the decision just before the two got into their cars for the final stint. Then, not long before the finish, the Automobile Club de l'Ouest (ACO), organizers of the Le Mans event, informed Ford that the geographical difference in starting positions would be taken into account at a close finish. This meant that the McLaren/Amon vehicle, which had started perhaps 60 feet (18 m) behind the Hulme-Miles car, would have covered slightly more ground over the 24 hours and would, in the event of a tie for first place, be the winner. Secondly, Ford officials admitted later, the company's contentious relationship with Miles, its top contract driver, placed executives in a difficult position. They could reward an outstanding driver who had been at times extremely difficult to work with, or they could decide in favor of drivers (McLaren/Amon) who had committed less to the Ford program but who had been easier to deal with. Ford stuck with the orchestrated photo finish. What happened on the last lap remains the subject of speculation. Either Miles, deeply bitter over this decision after his dedication to the program, issued his own protest by suddenly slowing just yards from the finish and letting McLaren across the line first, or Bruce McLaren accelerated just before the finish line robbing Miles of his victory. Either way, McLaren's car was declared the victor.

Neither driver had many opportunities to elaborate on the event, as both died testing new race cars, McLaren in 1970. Already two months later in 1966 Ken Miles died at the wheel of the Ford "J-car" at Riverside Raceway. The J-car was a GT40 prototype that included several unique features, most notably an aluminium-honeycomb chassis construction and a "bread-van" body-design that experimented with "Kammback" aerodynamic theories. Miles' fatal accident was attributed at least partly to the unproven aerodynamics of the J-car design, and to the experimental chassis' strength that had no roll cage yet.

The team embarked on a complete redesign of the car, which became known as the Mk IV. The Mk IV newer design, with a Mk II engine but a different chassis and a different body, won the 1967 24 Hours of Le Mans (when four Mark IVs, three Mark IIs, and three Mark Is raced), but only two of them finished, 1st and 4th. The high speeds achieved in that race caused a rule change, which already came into effect in 1968: the prototypes were limited to the capacity of 3.0 litres, the same as in Formula One since 1966. This took out not only the Ford Mk II and Mk IV, but also the Chaparral V8 Chevy, and the V12-powered Ferrari 330P and Jaguar XJ13 (in development).

=== Racing history '68-'69 ===
The rule change of late 1967 meant that there would be few 3-litre prototype entries in early 1968, most of them of (too) small capacity, like 2.0 litre Alfa Romeo Tipo 33/2 and 2.2 litre Porsche 907, later 3.0 litre Porsche 908. Ferrari remained absent in protest, but Matra and others entered. Most of the few F1 engines were too unreliable for endurance, let alone 24 hours. Ford's own Cosworth V8 had been introduced to F1 in 1967, where it was a success into the early 1980s, but vibrations prevented it from succeeding in endurance racing (Ford P68 and others), even though the 1975 and 1980s Le Mans races were won with later Ford Cosworth engine versions, after Matra had won 1972 to 1974 with their V12.

To attract more entrants, who also could compete for overall wins and points towards the 1968 World Sportscar Championship simplified International Championship for Makes, existing sportscars like the GT40 and the Lola T70 were allowed, with a maximum of 5.0 l if at least 50 cars had been built. For the many GT40 Mk.Is which had been built mainly in 1965, were homologated in February 1966, and won the Sportcars championship in 1966 and 1967, some modifications were allowed in early 1968, regarding the Cylinder head, an Engine with 4942cc, and Gearbox with Limited slip differential.

John Wyer's team revised the 4.7-liter, bored to 4.9 litre, and O-rings cut and installed between the block and head to prevent head gasket failure, a common problem found with the 4.7 engine. The JWA Mk I won the 24 hours of Le Mans race in 1968 against the fragile smaller 3.0 litre prototypes from Porsche, Alfa and others. This result, added to four other WC round wins for the GT40, gave Ford unexpected victory in the 1968 International Championship for Makes. The GT40's intended 3.0 l replacements, the Cosworth DFV powered Ford P68, and John Wyer JWA Gulf Mirage M2/M3 cars proved a dismal failure.

For 1969, the minimum number for Gr.4 sportscar status was lowered to 25, and Porsche made the daring investment to build 25 4.5 l flat-12-powered Porsche 917 up front in secrecy to get homologated from May 1969 onwards until the end of 1971. While facing more experienced prototypes and the new yet still unreliable Porsche 917s, Wyer's 1969 24 Hours of Le Mans winners Jacky Ickx/Jackie Oliver managed to beat the remaining 3.0-liter Porsche 908 by just a few seconds with the already outdated GT40 Mk I, in the very car that had won in 1968 – the legendary chassis GT40P/1075. Apart from brake-wear in the Porsche and the decision not to change brake-pads so close to the end of the race, the winning combination was relaxed driving by both GT40 drivers and heroic efforts at the right time by Ickx (at that time Le Mans' rookie). Ickx, protesting the by now unsafe traditional Le Mans start, had walked to his car and properly strapped his seat belts before taking off well behind the others. He would go on to win Le Mans five more times in later years, mainly with Porsche Turbos.

=== Le Mans 24 Hours victories ===
Le Mans 24 Hours victories
Year	Car	Team	Drivers	Engine	Tyre	Distance in km	Speed	
Year	Car	Team	Drivers	Engine	Tyre	Distance in km	mph	km/h
1966	GT40P/1046 (Mk II)	(United States) Shelby-American Inc.	(New Zealand) Bruce McLaren (New Zealand) Chris Amon	Ford 7.0L V8	G	4843.09	125.39	201.80
1967	J5 (Mk IV)	(United States) Shelby-American Inc.	(United States) Dan Gurney (United States) A. J. Foyt	Ford 7.0L V8	G	5232.9	135.48	218.03
1968	GT40P/1075 (Mk I)	(United Kingdom) John Wyer Automotive Engineering Ltd.	(Mexico) Pedro Rodriguez (Belgium) Lucien Bianchi	Ford 4.9 L V8	F	4452.88	115.29	185.54
1969	GT40P/1075 (Mk I)	(United Kingdom) John Wyer Automotive Engineering Ltd.	(Belgium) Jacky Ickx (United Kingdom) Jackie Oliver	Ford 4.9 L V8	F	4997.88	129.40	208.25

=== International titles ===
In addition to four consecutive overall Le Mans victories, Ford also won the following four FIA international titles (at what was then unofficially known as the World Sportscar Championship) with the GT40 car:

- 1966 International Manufacturers Championship – Sports prototype category (over 2000cc)
- 1966 International Championship for Sports Cars – Grand Touring (GT) category (division III - over 2000cc)
- 1967 International Championship for Sports Cars – Grand Touring (GT) category (division III - over 2000cc)
- 1968 International Championship for Makes – Sports prototype category

== Original versions ==
=== Mk I ===
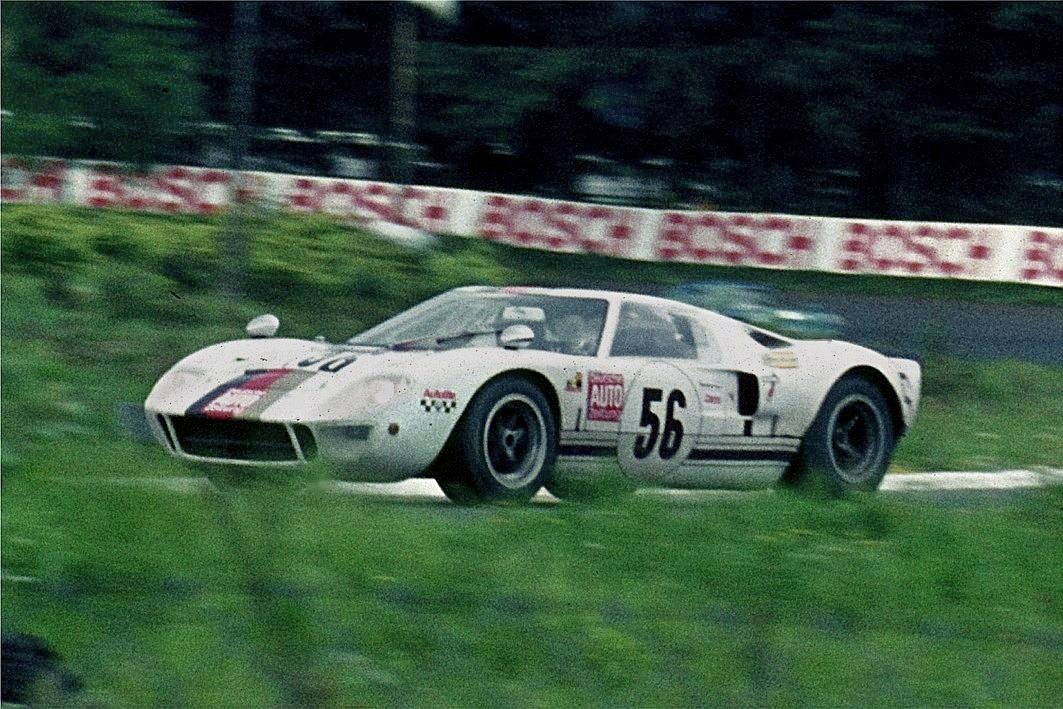
A GT40 Mk I competing in the 1969 Nurburgring 1000 km race

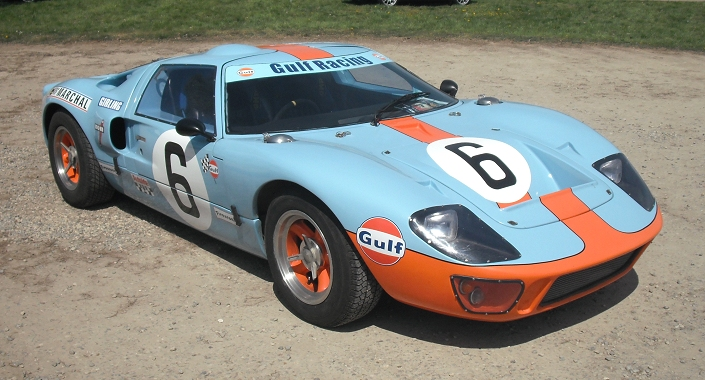
Mk I in Gulf Oil colors

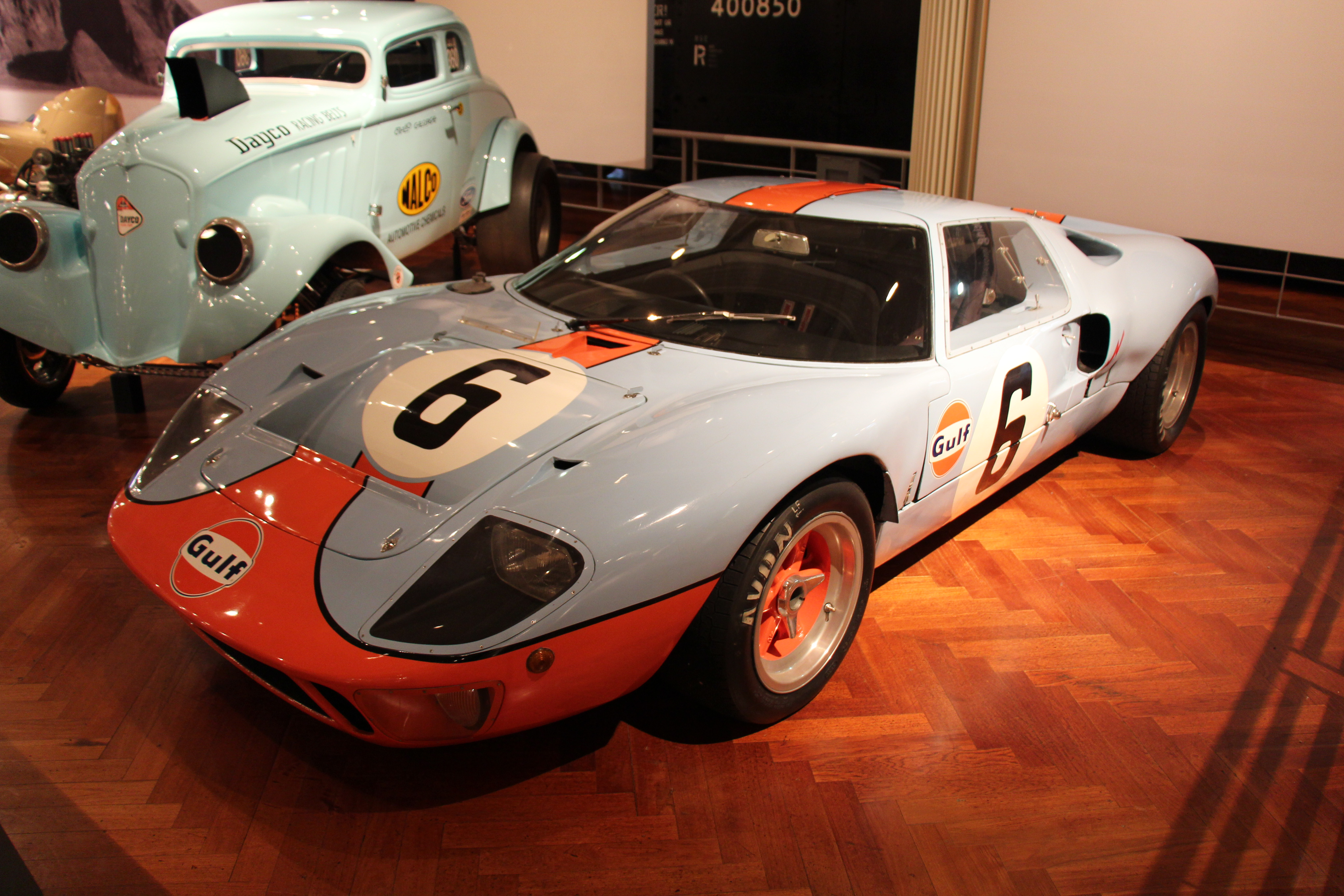
1968 GT40 Mk I

The Mk I was both the first and the last type of Ford GT40 to be raced, from 1964 to 1969. Early prototypes were powered by 255 cu in (4.2 L) alloy V8 engines and production models were powered by 289 cu in (4.7 L) engines as used in the Ford Mustang. Five prototype models were built with roadster bodywork, including the Ford X-1. Two lightweight cars (of a planned five), AMGT40/1 and AMGT40/2, were built by Alan Mann Racing in 1966, with light alloy bodies and other weight-saving modifications.

The Mk I met with little success in its initial tune during the 1964 season as it had to enter in the prototype class against faster prototypes like Ferrari Ps and Chaparrals. After the Nassau race in December, Ford handed over the project to Carroll Shelby's Shelby American team. The car won the 1965 Continental 2000 km of Daytona and the 12 Hours of Sebring, but otherwise the GT40 program was a disappointment overall, once again failing to finish at Le Mans. But dozens of Mk.I cars were made and sold in 1965, and as the minimum number of 50 was met, the FIA homologated it as a Group 4 sports car in the 5-litre class, valid from 1966 to 1971. With competition mainly from Ferrari 250 LM homologated with a significantly smaller 3.3 litre engine, Mk.Is owned and competed by customers could score nearly all 5 litre sportscar class wins in the 1966 and 1967 World Sportscar Championship, while factory-entered 7 litre Mk.II challenged for overall wins in the big prototype class.

Following the fast 1967 24 Hours of Le Mans, the FIA changed the rules to ban unlimited capacity engines, imposing a 3-litre capacity limit as in Formula 1 on the prototypes, ruling out the 427 cu in (7 L) Ford V8, the 4 litre Ferrari 330P4 and others. However, homologated Group 4 sportscars with up to 5 litre could still race and score points for their manufacturers in a simplified 1968 World Sportscar Championship format, extending their life and bolstering the otherwise low number of entrants.

It soon turned out that putting F1 engines into prototype endurance race chassis did not work due to lack of reliability, as Ford found with the Ford P68 that suffered from vibrations from the Ford Cosworth DFV engine. The J.W. Automotive Gulf-Wyer team tried to build its Mirage M2 with a BRM V12 F1 engine, later an M3 with a Cosworth DFV, and refurbished the old Mk.I with upgrades that were permitted by FIA, such as new cylinder heads enlarging the engine to 4942 cc, new gearbox, and a limited-slip differential. Ferrari boycotted the 1968 sportscar season in protest as it lacked a suitable engine.

The 1968 season began slowly for JWA, losing at Sebring and Daytona to 2.2-litre Porsche 907 before taking their first win at the BOAC International 500 at Brands Hatch. Later victories included the 1000 km of Monza, of Spa, and the 6 Hours of Watkins Glen Only 5 results would count, and both Porsche and Ford had 4 wins each before the main event that was postponed due to political unrest from June to September: the 1968 24 Hours of Le Mans.

Even with additional time, the Porsche 908 as the first prototype built for the new 3-liter Group 6 rules, had teething problems. With Porsche still connected with Volkswagen and using an aircooled two-valve engine, the design had only 350 hp but low weight and low drag. The new Porsche team managers did not read the French rules properly, and attempted to replace failing generators instead of repairing them. Alfa Romeo, Matra and Alpine has works entries with small or unproven engines. The five GT40s were anything but bullet proof, with four DNFs, but the lone surviving Mk I won the 1968 24 Hours of Le Mans and the World Championship of Makes, as Pedro Rodríguez and Lucien Bianchi had a clear lead over the best 2.2-litre, 270 hp Porsche 907, driving the 'almighty' #9 car with the 'Gulf Oil' colors. The engine installed on this car was a naturally aspirated Windsor 302 cu in (4.9 L) V8 with a compression ratio of 10.6:1; fuel fed by four 2-barrel 48 IDA Weber carburettors, rated at 317 kW (425 hp; 431 PS) at 6,000 rpm and a maximum torque of 395 lb⋅ft (536 N⋅m) at 4,750 rpm. The same chassis would win again in 1969 in a close finish over a Porsche 908.

A total of 31 Mk I cars were built at the Slough factory in "road" trim, which differed little from the race versions. Wire wheels, carpet, ruched fabric map pockets in the doors and a cigarette lighter made up most of the changes. Some cars deleted the ventilated seats, and at least one (chassis 1049) was built with the opening metal-framed windows from the Mk III.

X-1 Roadster

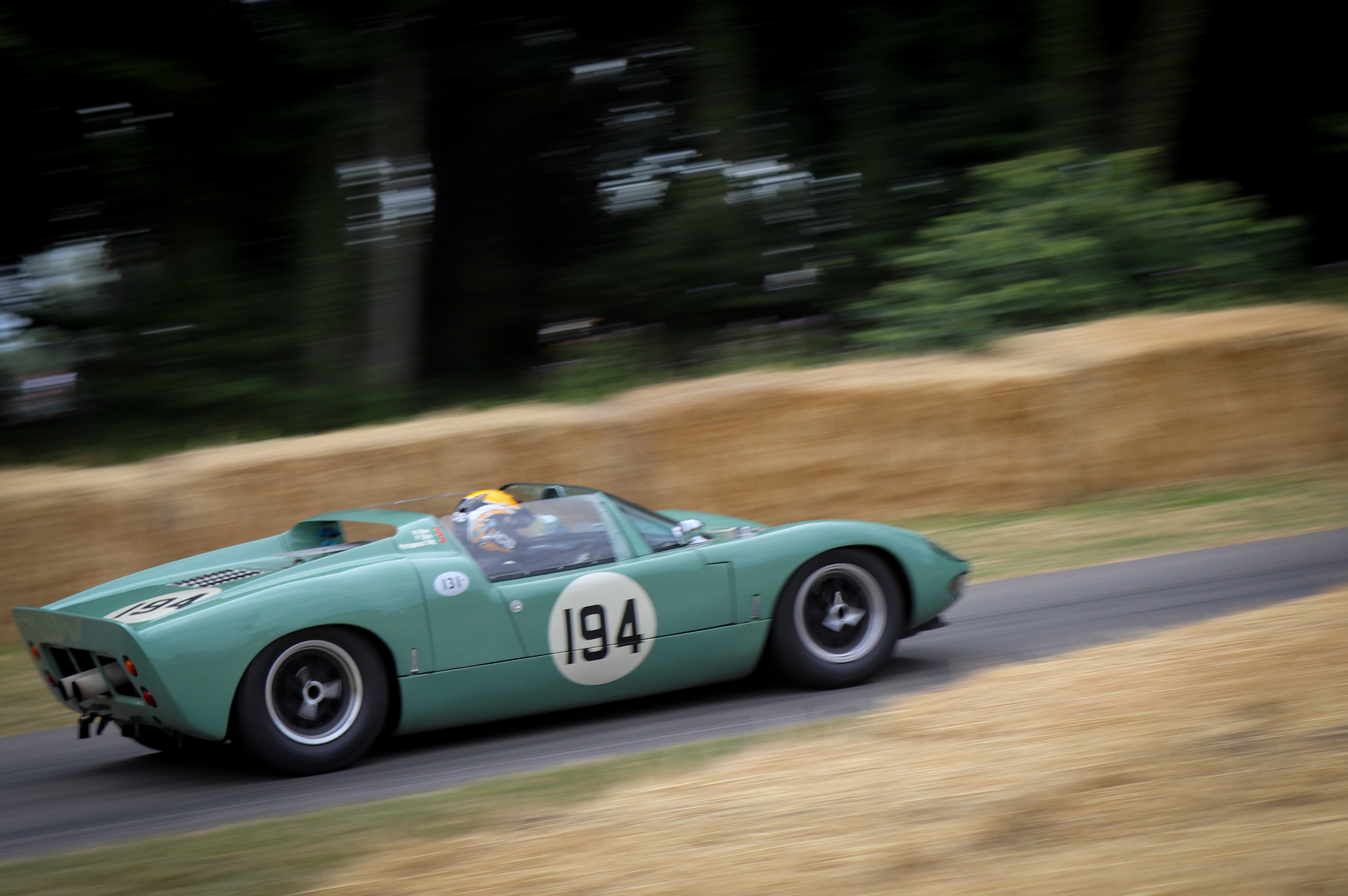
1965 Ford GT40 Roadster prototype (GT/111) at Goodwood FOS in 2019

The X-1 was a roadster built to contest the Fall 1965 North American Pro Series, a forerunner of Can-Am, entered by the Bruce McLaren racing team and driven by Chris Amon. The car had an aluminium chassis built at Abbey Panels and was originally powered by a 289 cu in (4.7L) engine. The real purpose of this car was to test several improvements originating from Kar Kraft, Shelby, and McLaren. Several gearboxes were used: a Hewland LG500 and at least one automatic gearbox. It was later upgraded to Mk II specifications with a 427 cu in (7 L) engine and a standard four ratio Kar Kraft (subsidiary of Ford) gearbox, however, the car kept specific features such as its open roof and lightweight aluminium chassis. The car went on to win the 12 Hours of Sebring in 1966. The X-1 was a one-off and, having been built in the United Kingdom and being liable for United States tariffs, was later ordered to be destroyed by United States customs officials.

=== Mk II ===
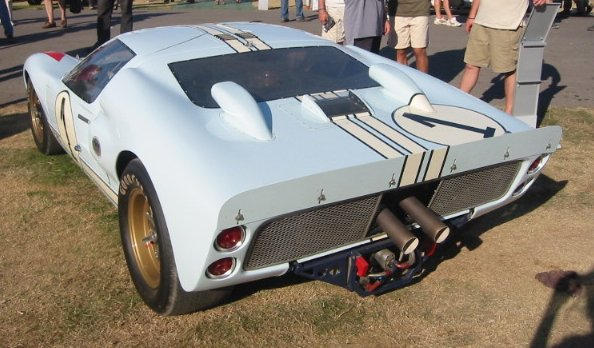
GT40 Mk II rear

The Mk I design was altered separately by both Holman Moody and Shelby American to handle the much larger highly modified 427 cu in (7.0 L) "big block" Ford FE engine side oiler from the Ford's large family car called Ford Galaxie, used in NASCAR at the time and modified for road course use. Referred to retroactively as the Ford Mk II, the car had a new Kar Kraft-built four-speed gearbox (KKL-108 also called a Ford box) in place of the overpowered ZF five-speed (which had already belatedly replaced the over-stressed Colleti in the Mk I) used in the Mk I.

In 1966, the three teams racing the Mk II (Chris Amon and Bruce McLaren, Denny Hulme and Ken Miles, and Dick Hutcherson and Ronnie Bucknum) dominated Le Mans, taking European audiences by surprise and beating Ferrari to finish 1-2-3 in the standings. Ford GT40 went on to win the Le Mans race for the next three years, but in very different form, as Mk.IV in 1967, and then twice an old Mk.I.

For the 1967 Daytona 24 Hours, two Mk II models (chassis 1016 and 1047) had their bodies and engines re-badged as Mercury vehicles and engines to promote that division of the Ford Motor Company.

In 2018, a Mk II that was 3rd overall at the 1966 Le Mans 24 Hours was sold by RM Sotheby's for $9,795,000 (£7,624,344) - the highest price paid at that time for a GT40 at auction.

==== Mk II B ====
For 1967, the Mk IIs were upgraded to "B" spec, with re-designed bodywork and twin Holley carburettors (giving an additional 11 kilowatts (15 hp; 15 PS)). The new bodywork removed two top vents, which were for cooling rear brakes and added a spare wheel at the rear end. A batch of improperly heat-treated input shafts in the transaxles side-lined virtually every Ford in the race at the 24 Hours of Daytona, however, and Ferrari won 1–2–3. The Mk IIBs were also used for Sebring and Le Mans that year and won the Reims 12 Hours in France.

=== Mk III ===
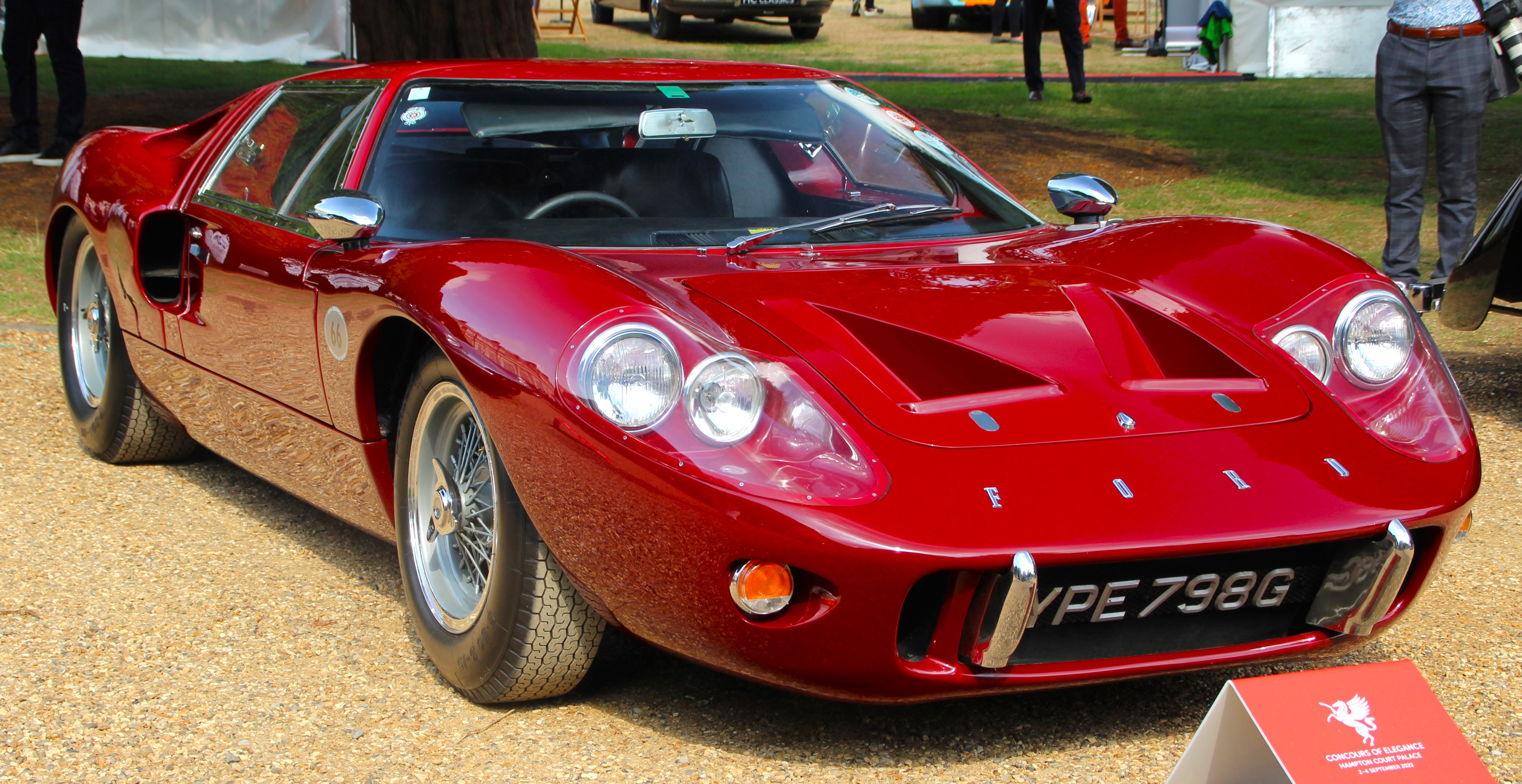
Ford GT40 Mk III

The Mk III was a street-legal version of the GT40 Mk I, with its 289 cu in (4.74 L) engine detuned to 228 kW (306 hp; 310 PS). A total of seven were built, four with right-hand drive, with four headlamps (raised to meet US lighting standards), an expanded rear (for luggage room), softer shock absorbers, a center-mounted shift lever, and an ashtray. As the Mk III looked significantly different from the racing models due to the aforementioned lighting and lengthening for storage many customers interested in buying a GT40 for road use chose to buy a Mk I that was available from Wyer Ltd.

=== Mk IV ===
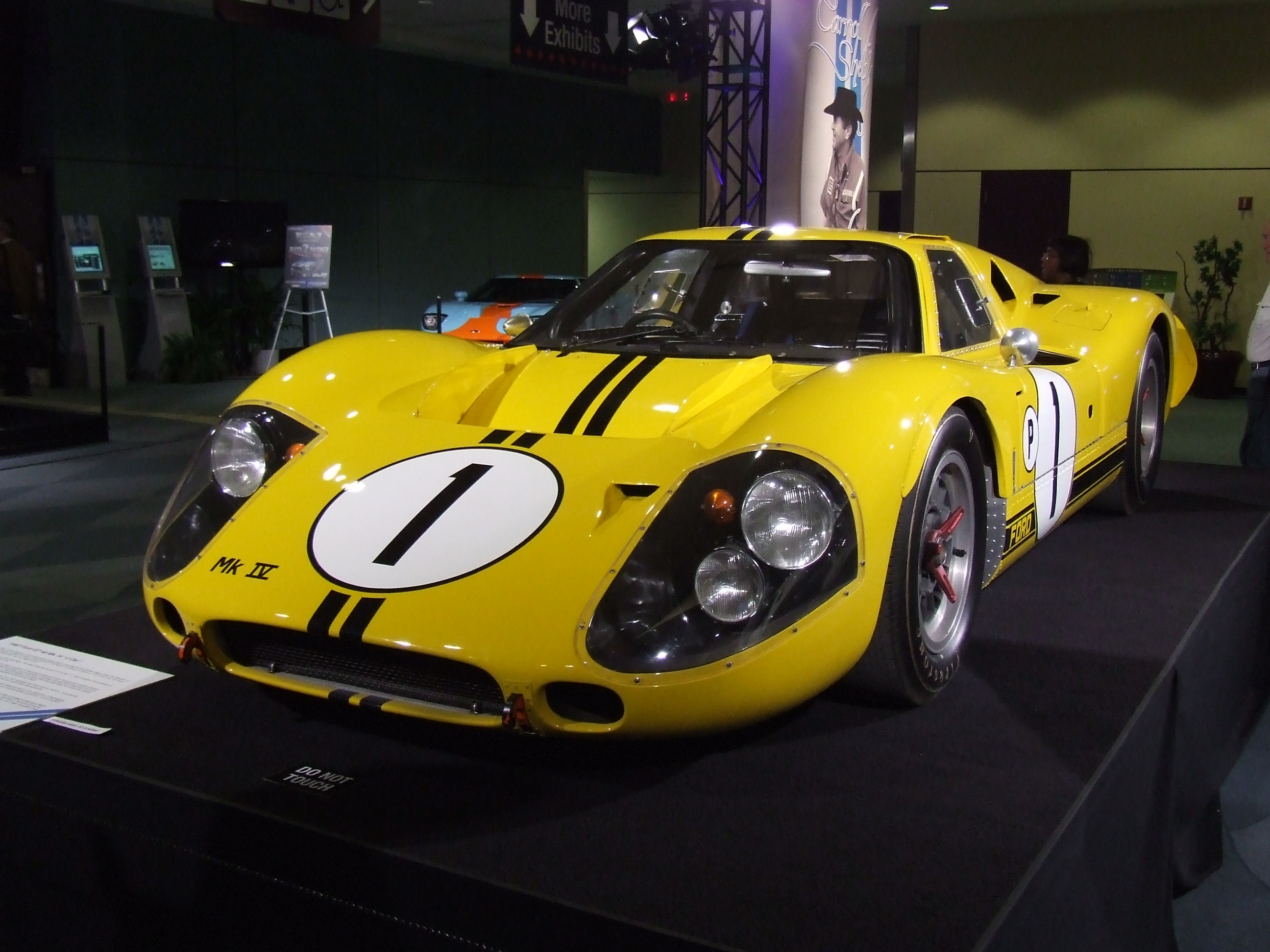
1967 Ford GT40 Mk IV. This particular car, J-4, won the 1967 12 Hours of Sebring.

In an effort to develop a car with better aerodynamics (potentially resulting in superior control and speed compared to competitors), the decision was made to re-conceptualize and redesign everything about the vehicle other than its 7-liter engine. This became the Mk IV.

To bring the GT40 project into alignment with Ford's "in house" production ideology, more restrictive partnerships were implemented with the English suppliers and engineering firms. This resulted in the sale of Ford Advanced Vehicles to John Wyer, ultimately leading to a new vehicle which would be slated for design by Ford's studios and produced by Ford's subsidiary Kar-Kraft under Ed Hull. Furthermore, there was also a partnership with the Brunswick Aircraft Corporation for expertise on the novel use of aluminium honeycomb panels bonded together to form a lightweight, rigid "tub".

The nickname "J-car" came from its construction to meet the new Appendix J regulations introduced by the FIA in 1966; the redesign resulted in the abandonment of the original Mk I/Mk II chassis.

The first J-car was completed in March 1966 and set the fastest time at the Le Mans trials that year. The tub weighed only 86 lb (39 kg), and the entire car weighed only 2,660 lb (1,207 kg), 300 lb (136 kg) less than the Mk II. In spite of this, it was decided to run the Mk IIs due to their proven reliability, and little or no development was done on the J-car for the rest of the season. Following Le Mans, the development program for the J-car was resumed, and a second car was built. During a test session at Riverside International Raceway in August 1966 with Ken Miles driving, the car suddenly went out of control at the end of its high-speed, one-mile-long (1.6 km) back straight. The honeycomb chassis shattered upon impact, and the car burst into flames, killing Miles. It was determined that the unique, flat-topped "bread van" aerodynamics of the car, lacking any sort of spoiler, led to excess lift. Therefore, a conventional but significantly more aerodynamic body was designed. A total of nine cars were constructed with J-car specification chassis, with six designated as Mk IVs and one as the G7A.

=== Racing ===
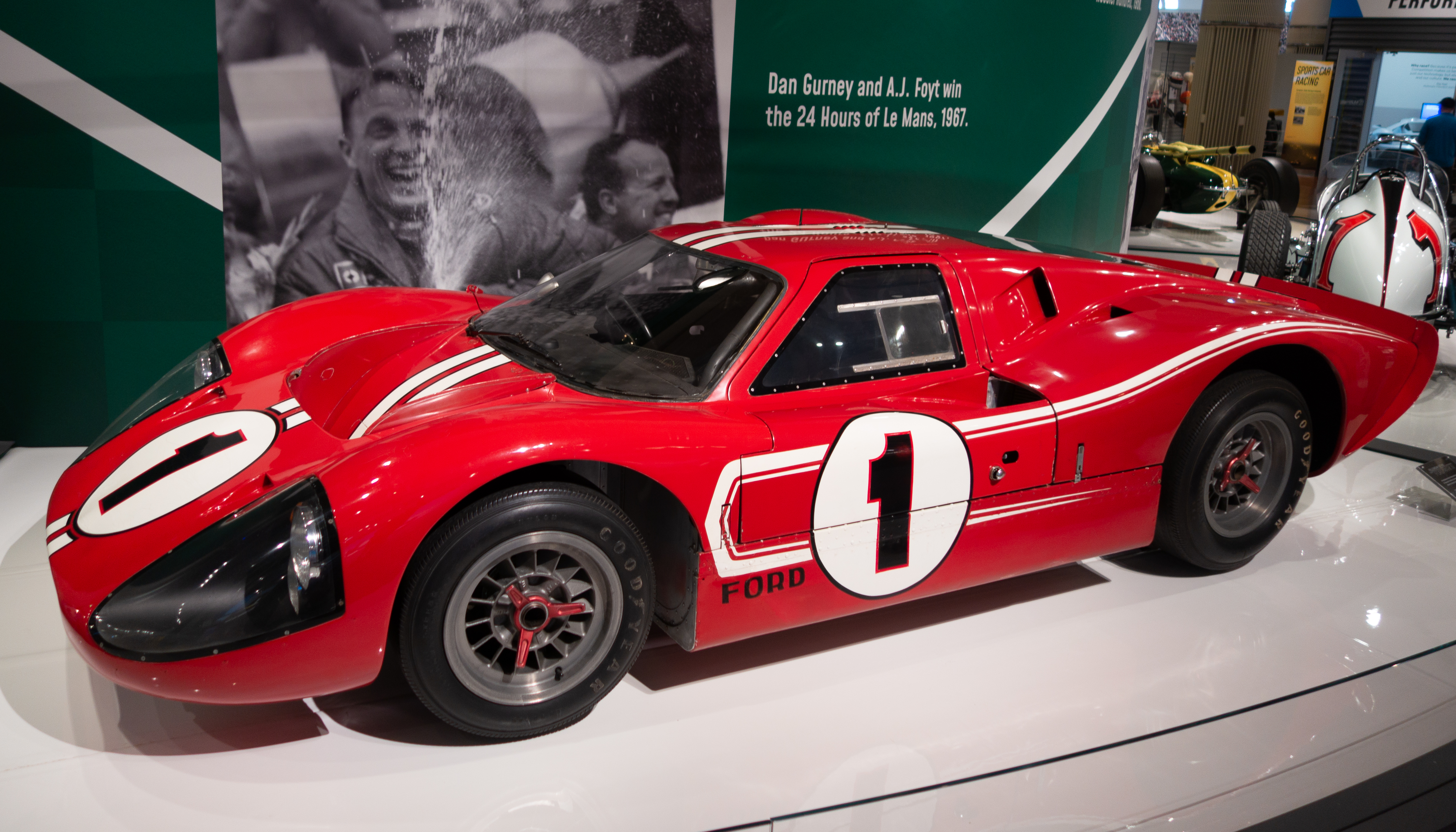
Ford GT40 Mk IV

The Mk IV was built around a reinforced J chassis powered by the same 7.0-liter engine as the Mk II. The Mk IV used the engine, gearbox, some suspension parts and the brakes from the Mk II, but used a specific, all-new chassis and bodywork. Looking completely different from the Marks I through III, it was also the most American variant of all the GT40s. As a direct result of the Miles accident, the team installed a NASCAR-style steel-tube roll cage in the Mk IV, which made it much safer, but the roll cage was so heavy that it negated most of the weight saving of the then-highly advanced, radically innovative honeycomb-panel construction. The Mk IV had a long, streamlined shape, which gave it exceptional top speed, crucial to do well at Le Mans (a circuit made up predominantly of straight roads connecting tight corners)—the race it was ultimately built for. A 2-speed automatic gearbox was tried, but during the extensive testing of the J-car chassis in 1966 and 1967, it was decided that the 4-speed from the Mk II would be retained.

In 1966 and early 1967, Ford's R&D department in Detroit developed a test rig to simulate circuit laps; the rig was programmed to accurately mimic the characteristics of the target circuit. The Mk IV design was revised based on weeks of simulated Le Mans laps. This was an early example of the now-common practice of using test rigs for Formula One and Le Mans vehicle prototyping.

Thanks to its streamlined aerodynamics, the car proved to be fastest in the field at Le Mans in 1967, achieving 213 mph on the 3.6-mile Mulsanne Straight.

Dan Gurney, who was 6 feet 4 inches tall, requested a bubble-shaped bodywork extension over the driver's seat to accommodate him. Gurney also complained about the weight of the Mk IV, which was 600 pounds (270 kg) more than the Ferrari 330 P4, and, combined with its higher speed, put more stress on its brakes. During practice at Le Mans in 1967, in an effort to preserve the brakes, Gurney developed a strategy (also adopted by co-driver A.J. Foyt who had just won the 1967 Indianapolis 500) of backing completely off the throttle several hundred yards before the approach to the Mulsanne hairpin and virtually coasting into the braking area. This technique saved the brakes, but the resulting increase in the car's recorded lap times during practice led to mistaken speculation within the Ford team that Gurney and Foyt, in an effort to compromise on chassis settings, had hopelessly "dialed out" their car - despite Gurney having been the fastest GT40 pilot in the 1966 practice and race. Also, Gurney was developing his own Eagle V12 F1 car with which he would win the 1967 Belgian Grand Prix the very next weekend.

The Mk IV ran in only two races, the April 1967 12 Hours of Sebring and the June 1967 24 Hours of Le Mans, and won both events. Only one Mk IV was completed for Sebring; the pressure from Ford had been increased considerably after Ford's humiliation at the 1967 Daytona 24h in early February, when Ferrari staged a 1-2-3 finish, honored later by naming a road car the Ferrari Daytona. Mario Andretti and Bruce McLaren won Sebring, Dan Gurney and A. J. Foyt won Le Mans (their car was the Mk IV that was apparently least likely to win), where the Ford-representing Shelby-American and Holman & Moody teams showed up to Le Mans with 2 Mk IVs each. The installation of the roll cage was ultimately credited by many with saving the life of Andretti, who crashed violently at the Esses during the 1967 Le Mans yet escaped with minor injuries. Gurney later described the Mk IV as "half-way between a road-legal passenger car and a race car; it was reliable and comfortable, but heavy".

Unlike the earlier Mk I - III cars, the chassis of which were built in Britain, the Mk IV car was built entirely in the United States by Kar Kraft, Ford's performance division in Detroit. Thus, Le Mans 1967 still remains both the only all-American victory in Le Mans history — American drivers (Dan Gurney and A. J. Foyt), team (Shelby-American Inc.), chassis constructor (Ford), engine manufacturer (Ford), and tires (Goodyear) — as well as the only victory of a car designed and built entirely (both chassis and engine) in the United States. A total of six Mk IVs were constructed.

One of the Mk IVs was rebuilt to Group 7 (motorsport) rules as the Ford G7 in 1968, and used in the Can-Am series for 1969 and 1970, but with no success.

== Later versions ==
The Ford GT40 became obsolete twice in international racing, the large engine Mk.II and Mk.IV after 1967, when sports car prototypes had been limited to the 3.0 litre engine size used in Formula 1 since 1966. The Ford P68 (also Ford 3L GT or F3L) was a Ford-sponsored attempt to compete in that category with the Ford Cosworth DFV V8 F1 engine. As homologated 5 litre FIA Group 4 sportscars could still race from 1968 to 1971, an old Gulf-Wyer GT40 Mk.I chassis won Le Mans twice in 1968 and 1969, but when no less than 25 each of Porsche 917 and Ferrari 512S were tailor made for that set of rules, the older sportscars became obsolete for good despite being eligible in the World Championship until the end of 1971.

Since the 1970s, there was growing interest from enthusiasts rather than racers in Ford GT40s that could not be satisfied with the remaining GT40s, even though around 100 had originally been made. This led to the production of "continuation models" and replicas.

=== Continuation models ===
==== Mk V ====
For years Peter Thorp, owner of Safir Engineering, had searched for a GT40 in good condition. Most of the cars had problems, including significant rusting. His company was building and fielding Formula 3 race cars; in addition, it had a Token Formula One car purchased from the Ron Dennis Company, Rondel Racing. Formula One events in which Safir Engineering competed included Brands Hatch and Silverstone. Safir was also redesigning and exporting Range Rovers, modifying them to six-wheel drive. Safir had the technical capabilities to rebuild GT40s. Desiring to build new GT40s from scratch, Thorp approached John Willment, partner of John Wyer, for his thoughts. It was soon decided that there would be a limited, further run of the GT40. JW Engineering would oversee the build, with Safir doing the work. The continued JW Engineering/Safir Engineering GT40 production would utilize sequential serial numbers starting at the last used serial number. Maintaining the vehicle's Mark nomenclature, the new cars would be referred to as GT40 Mk Vs.

JW Engineering wished to complete the existing GT40 chassis numbers GT40P-1087, 1088 and 1089 prior to the beginning of Safir production; this, however, was very much delayed.

Ford's Len Bailey was hired to inspect the proposed build and engineer any changes to minimize known problems with the car, and upgrade safety to modern standards he thought prudent. While the GT40 chassis was upgraded without making any major changes, Bailey upgraded the front suspension to Alan Mann Racing specifications, which minimized nose-dive under braking. Zinc coated steel replaced the previous uncoated rust-prone sheet metal. The vulnerable drive donuts were replaced with CV joints and the leak-prone rubber gas tanks were replaced with aluminum.

Metal fabricator Tennant Panels supplied the roof structure, and the balance of the chassis was completed by Safir with parts from Adams McCall Engineering. Bill Pink, noted for his electrical experience and the wiring installation of previous GT40s, was brought in. Also, Jim Rose was hired for his experience with working at both Alan Mann and Shelby. After the manufacture of chassis 1120, John Etheridge was hired to manage the MkV GT40 build.

For the most part, the Mk V resembled very closely the Mk I car; as with the '60s production, very few cars were identical.

The first new build, GT40P-1090, had an open-top in place of roof-hinged doors. Most motors were Ford "small block" V8s, fitted with twin-Weber or 4-barrel carburettors. Safir produced five "big block" Mk V GT40s, serial numbers GT40P-1128 to GT40P-1132. These aluminium bodied cars all had easily removable door roof sections. Although most Mk V GT40s were high-performance street cars, some were built solely to race specs. Two road cars, a roadster (GT40P-1133), and a standard configuration (GT40P-1142), were built with lightweights aluminium honeycomb chasses and carbon fiber bodywork.

=== Replicas and modernizations ===
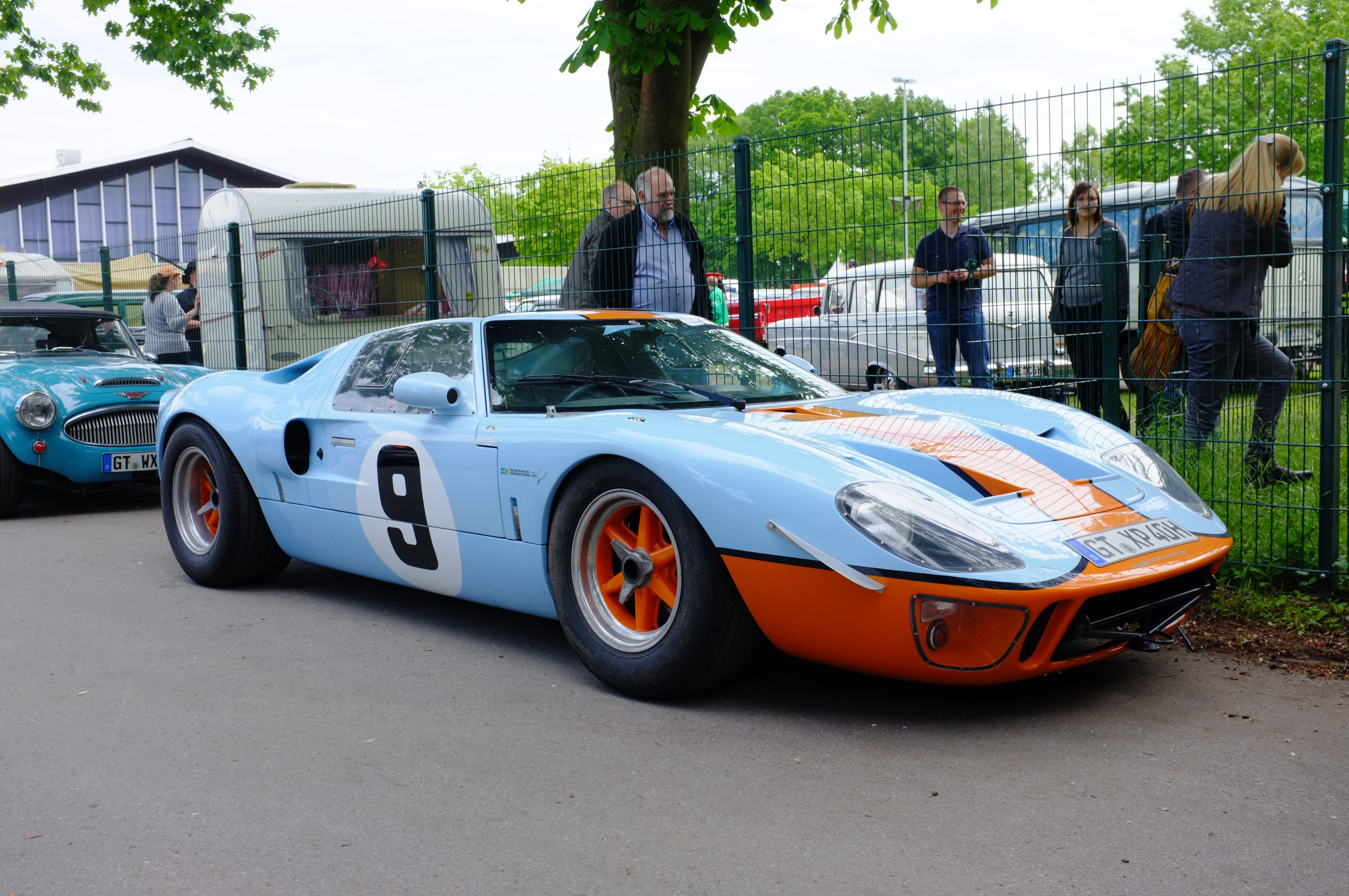
Replica Ford GT40 bearing the #9 of Rodríguez and Bianchi, winners of the 1968 24 Hours of Le Mans

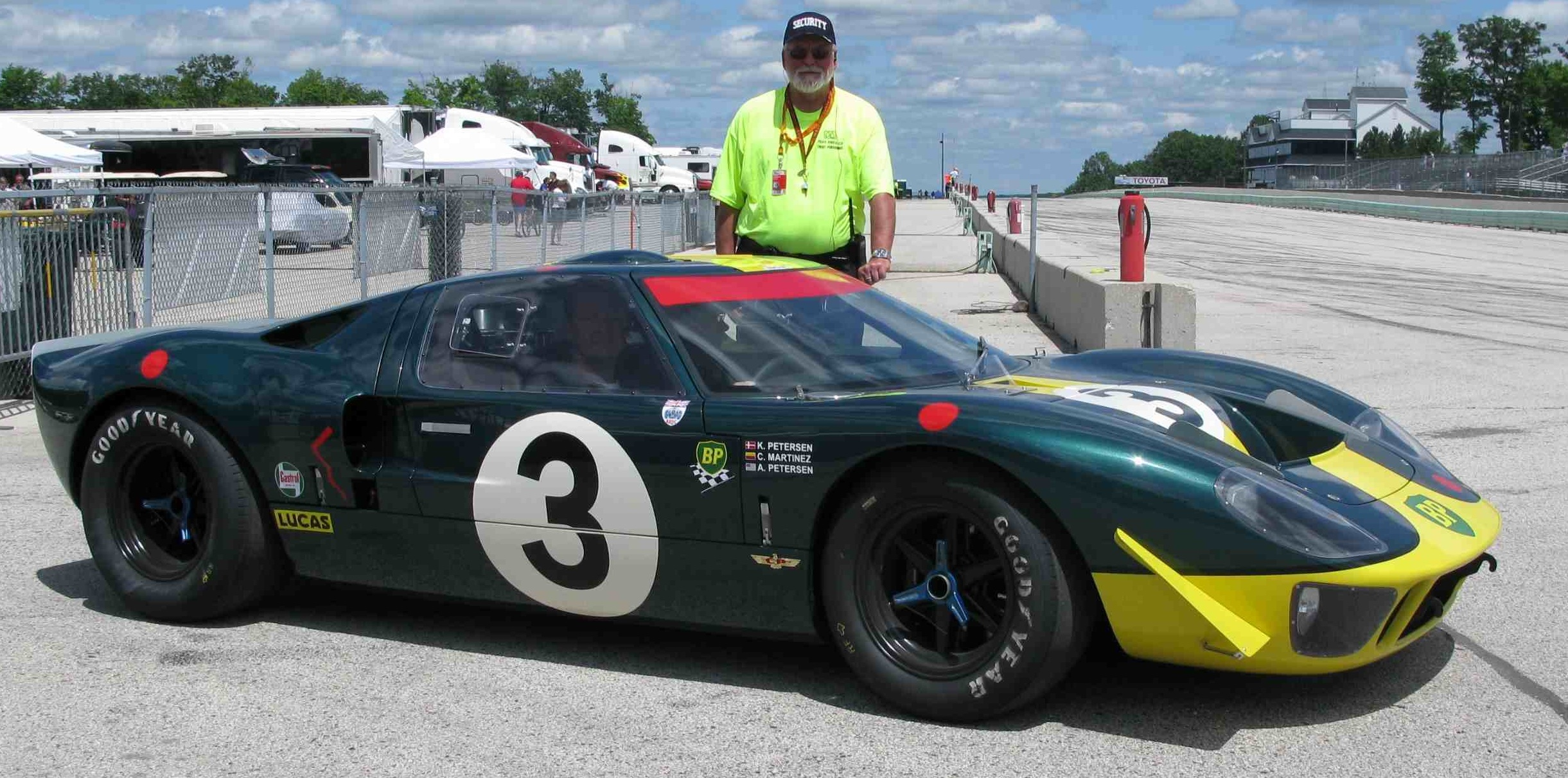
GT40/R Competition at Road America

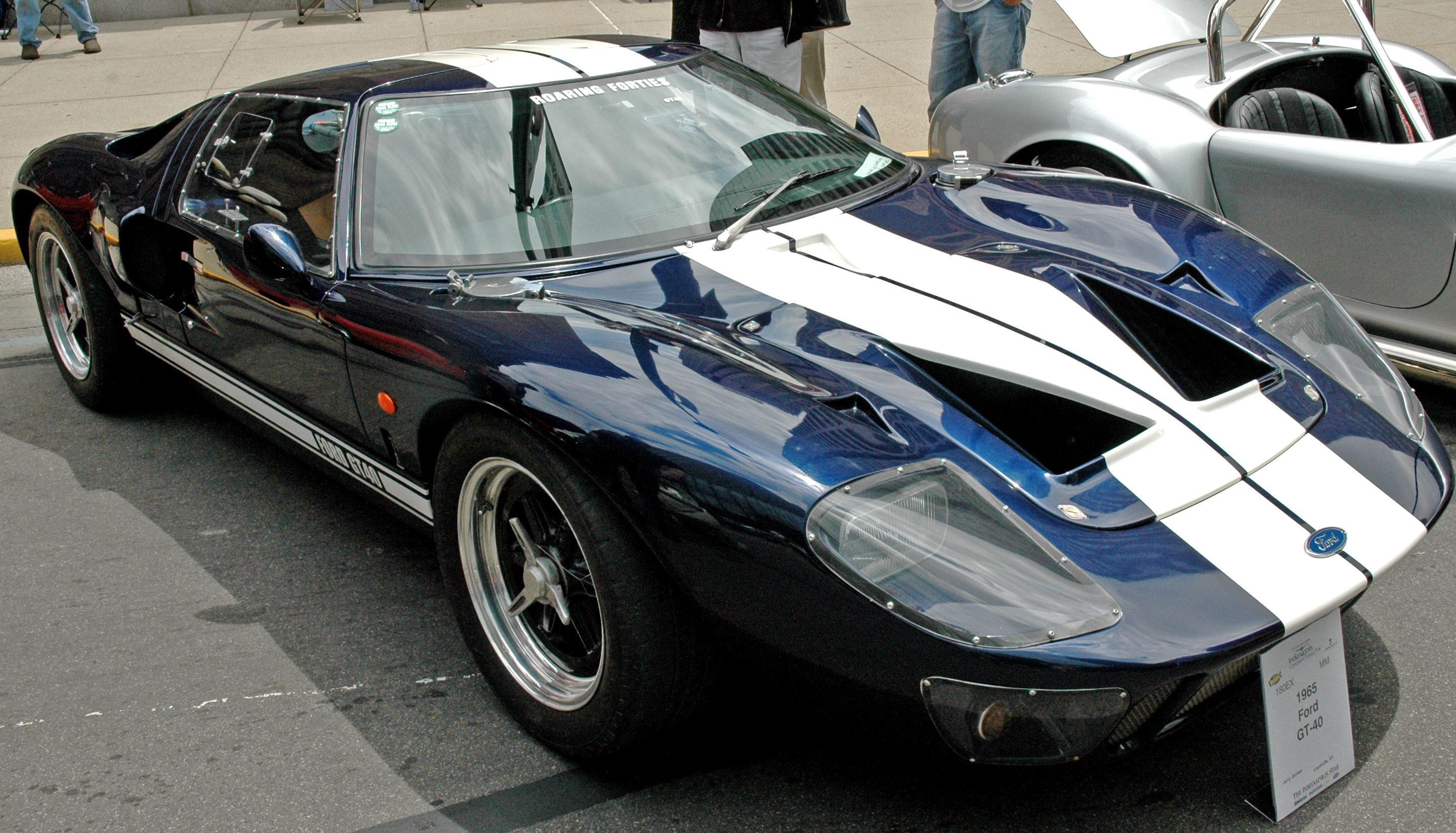
A "Roaring Forties" replica of a 1965 Ford GT40 in Shelby livery on display at the 2005 United States Grand Prix

Several kit cars and replicas inspired by the Ford GT40 have been built. They are generally intended for assembly in a home workshop or garage. There are two alternatives to the kit car approach, either continuation models (exact and licensed replicas true to the original GT40) or modernizations (replicas with upgraded components, ergonomics & trim for improved usability, drivability, and performance).

- GT40/R Competition, United States: Authentic GT40 built by Superformance and co-designed with Pathfinder Motorsports. This is the only GT40 continuation licensed by Safir GT40 Spares LLC, the holders of the GT40 trademark. A GT40/R (GT40P/2094) campaigned by Pathfinder Motorsports with an engine built by Holman Moody won both the 2009 US Vintage Grand Prix and the 2009 Governor's Cup at Watkins Glen.
- Southern GT: Built-in Swanmore, Southampton, UK. Specializing in GT40 Mk1 and Mk2, as well as Lola T70. Kit form or fully built to your specifications.
- CAV GT: Originally designed for customers to build as a kit, the CAV GT has evolved into a modernized replica that is now factory-built in Cape Town, South Africa.
- Holman Moody: GT40 Mark II won third at Le Mans in 1966, and can still manufacture a Holman GT from 1966 blueprints.
- GT40 Spyder, United States: Built by E.R.A. Replica Automobiles in New Britain, CT, the Spyder is a MK2 Canadian American (CAN-AM) racing replica. The ERA GT is "No Longer Available" according to their website (3 October 2021).
- Ford GT40 By Everrati: Everatti's GT40 replica uses a Superformance body and is powered by a 700-volt electric architecture, allowing for fast charging. Everrati estimates it delivers 800 PS (588 kW) and 590 lb⋅ft (800 N⋅m) of torque, making it almost twice as powerful as the most powerful version of the original GT40.

== Ford GT ==
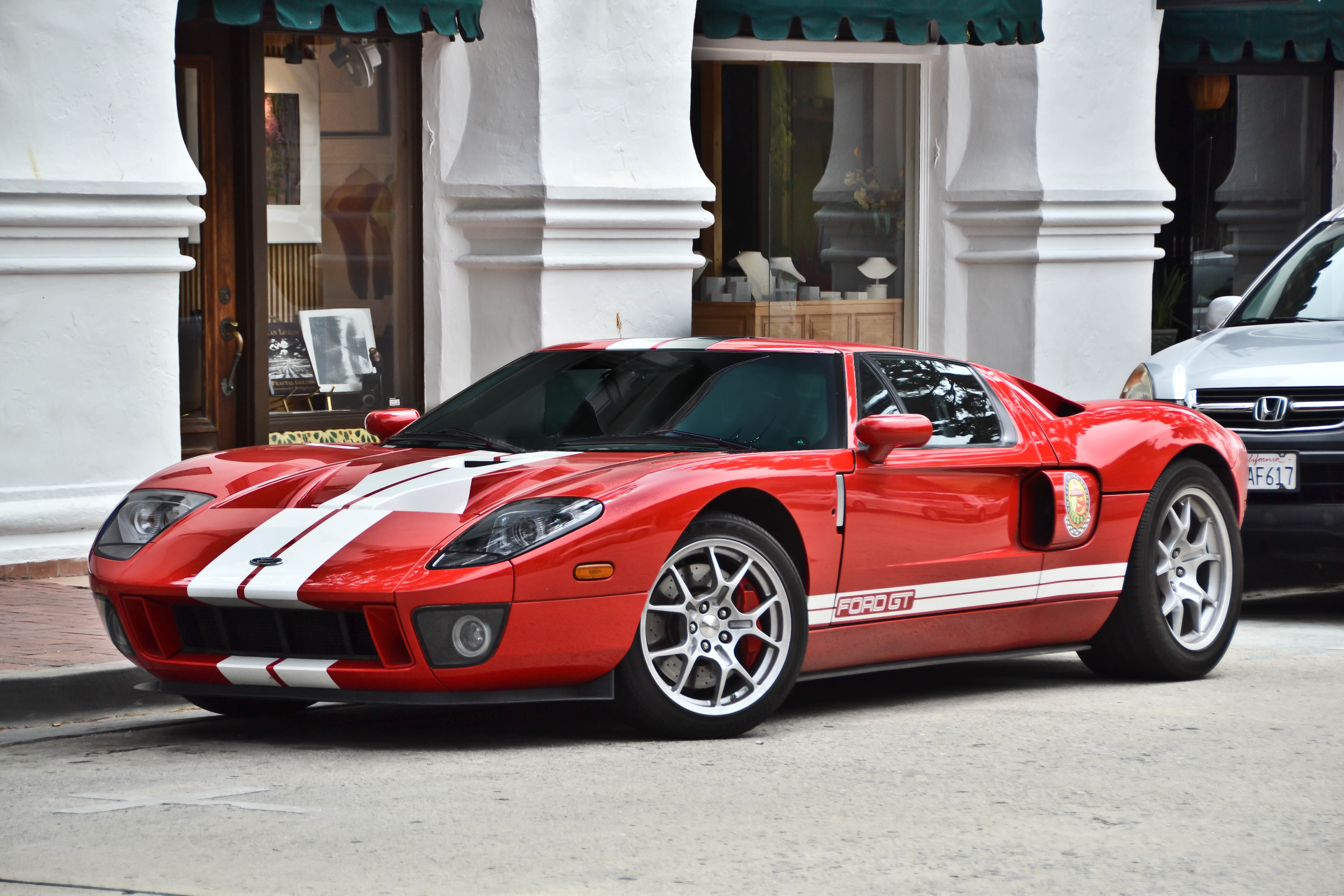
2005 Ford GT

The Ford GT is a modern reinterpretation of the GT40 manufactured by Ford Motor Company.

At the 1995 North American International Auto Show, the Ford GT90 concept was shown and at the 2002 show, a new GT40 Concept was unveiled by Ford. While similar in appearance to the original cars, it was bigger, wider, and 3 inches (76 mm) taller than the original 40 inches (1020 mm). Three production prototype cars were shown in 2003 as part of Ford's centenary, and delivery of the production Ford GT began in the fall of 2004. The Ford GT was assembled in the Ford Wixom, Michigan plant and painted by Saleen, Incorporated at their Saleen Special Vehicles plant in Troy, Michigan.

A British company, Safir Engineering, which continued to produce a limited number of GT40s (the Mk V) in the 1980s under an agreement with Walter Hayes of Ford and John Wilmont of J.W. Automotive Engineering, owned the GT40 trademark at that time, and when they completed production, they sold the excess parts, tooling, design, and trademark to a small American company called Safir GT40 Spares, Limited based in Ohio. Safir GT40 Spares licensed the use of the GT40 trademark to Ford for the initial 2002 show car, but when Ford decided to make the production vehicle, negotiations between the two failed, and as a result, the new Ford GT lost the "40" of GT40. Bob Wood, one of three partners who own Safir GT40 Spares, said: "When we talked with Ford, they asked what we wanted. We said that Ford owns Beanstalk in New York, the company that licenses the Blue Oval for Ford on such things as T-shirts. Since Beanstalk gets 7.5 percent of the retail cost of the item for licensing the name, we suggested 7.5 percent on each GT40 sold."

Ford, however, wished to purchase rather than license the GT40 trademark. At the then-estimated $125,000 per copy, 7.5% of 4,500 vehicles would have totalled approximately $42,187,500. This figure was widely reported following an Automotive News Weekly story that Safir "demanded" $40 million for the sale of the trademark. Fruitless discussions between Safir and Ford ensued. Later Ford GT models or prototypes have borne such previously unprotected designations as "Ford GT90" or the "Ford GT70". The GT40 name and trademark is currently licensed to Superformance in the USA.

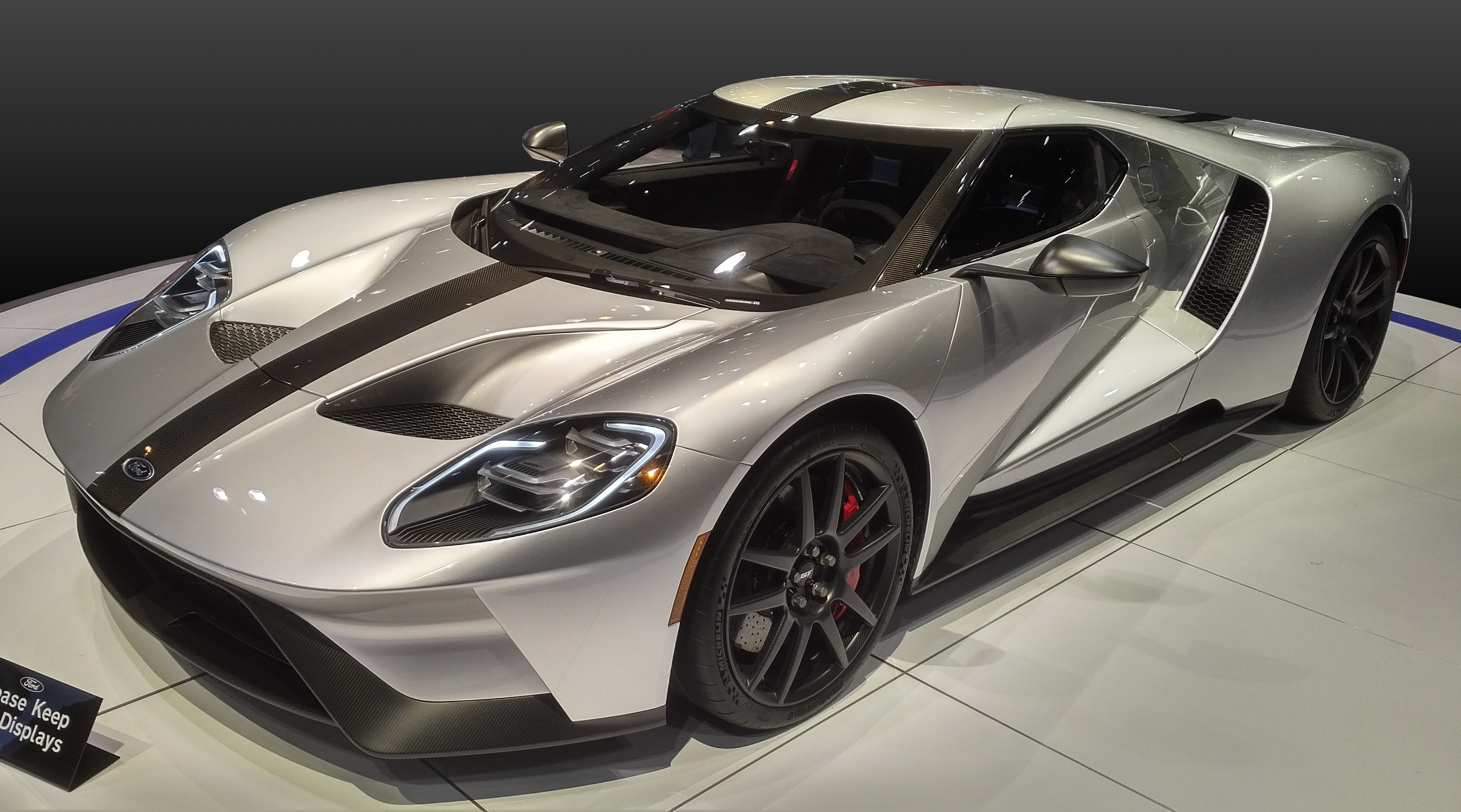
Second-generation Ford GT on display at the 2018 Chicago Auto Show

A second-generation Ford GT was unveiled at the 2015 North American International Auto Show. It features a 3.5L twin-turbocharged V6 engine, carbon fiber monocoque and body panels, pushrod suspension and active aerodynamics. It entered the 2016 season of the FIA World Endurance Championship and the United SportsCar Championship, and a street-legal second-generation production version started being sold at Ford dealerships in 2017.

== In media ==
The British television series The Avengers of the 1960s featured a Mk.1 painted silver in the 1965 episode From Venus with Love, used by the villains as a mobile, high-powered laser platform.

The 2019 movie Ford v Ferrari is about the GT40's development and victory at the 1966 24 Hours of Le Mans.

== See also ==
- Ford Supervan, a van-bodied variant
- Bundle of Snakes, tangled exhaust headers used on the GT40
- Colotti Trasmissioni, transmission of the initial, and early models
- AC Cobra, a high-performance street car and racer of similar Anglo-American heritage
- Ford v Ferrari, 2019 film about the GT40's development
