= Hawk HF3000 =

British kit car

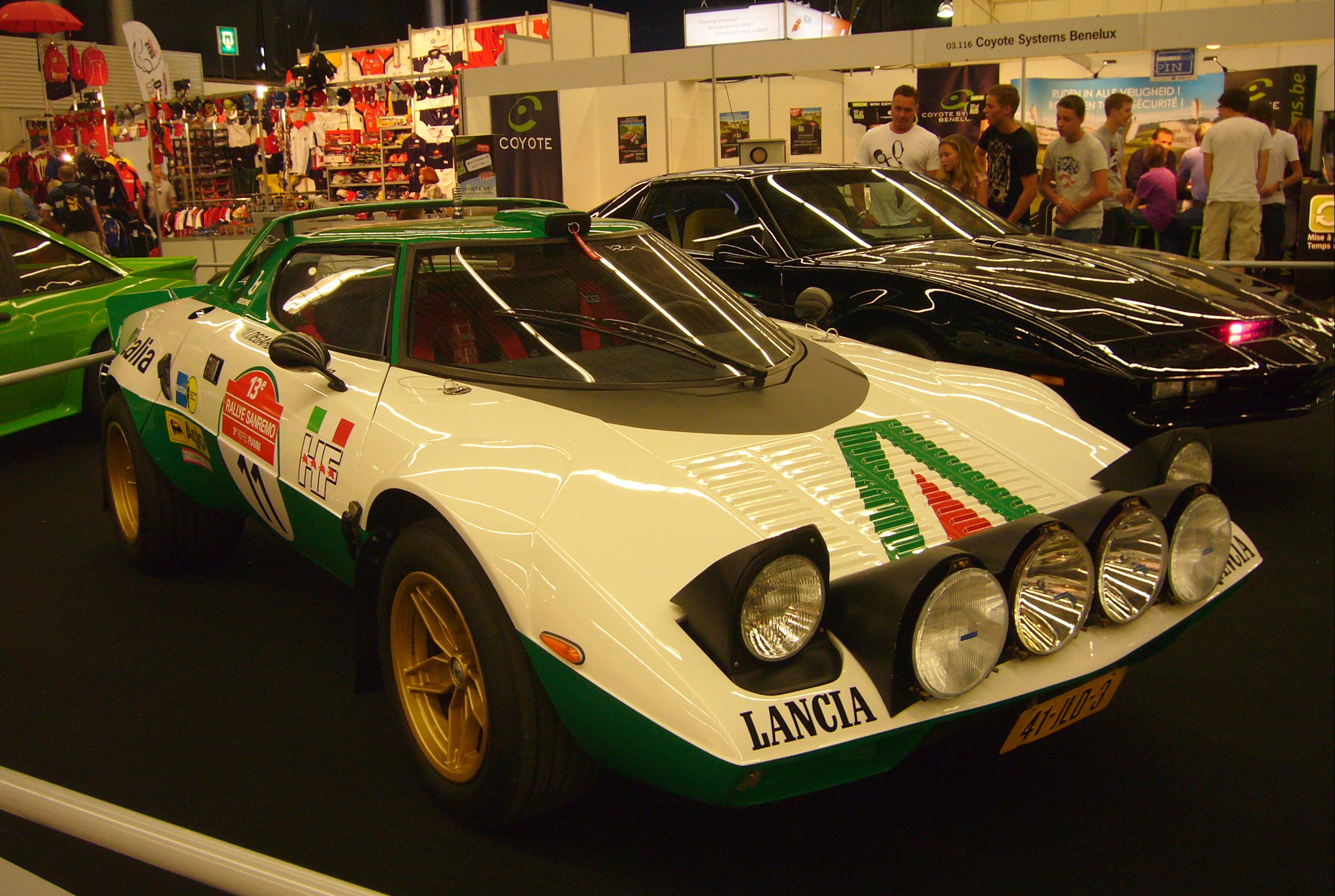
1988 Hawk HF3000

The Hawk HF3000 is a kit car based on the Lancia Stratos. It was built by the British automobile company Hawk Cars Ltd. This type of car can also be referred to as a continuation car or replica.
