= Lola Mk6 =

British racing car

Lola Mk6 GT
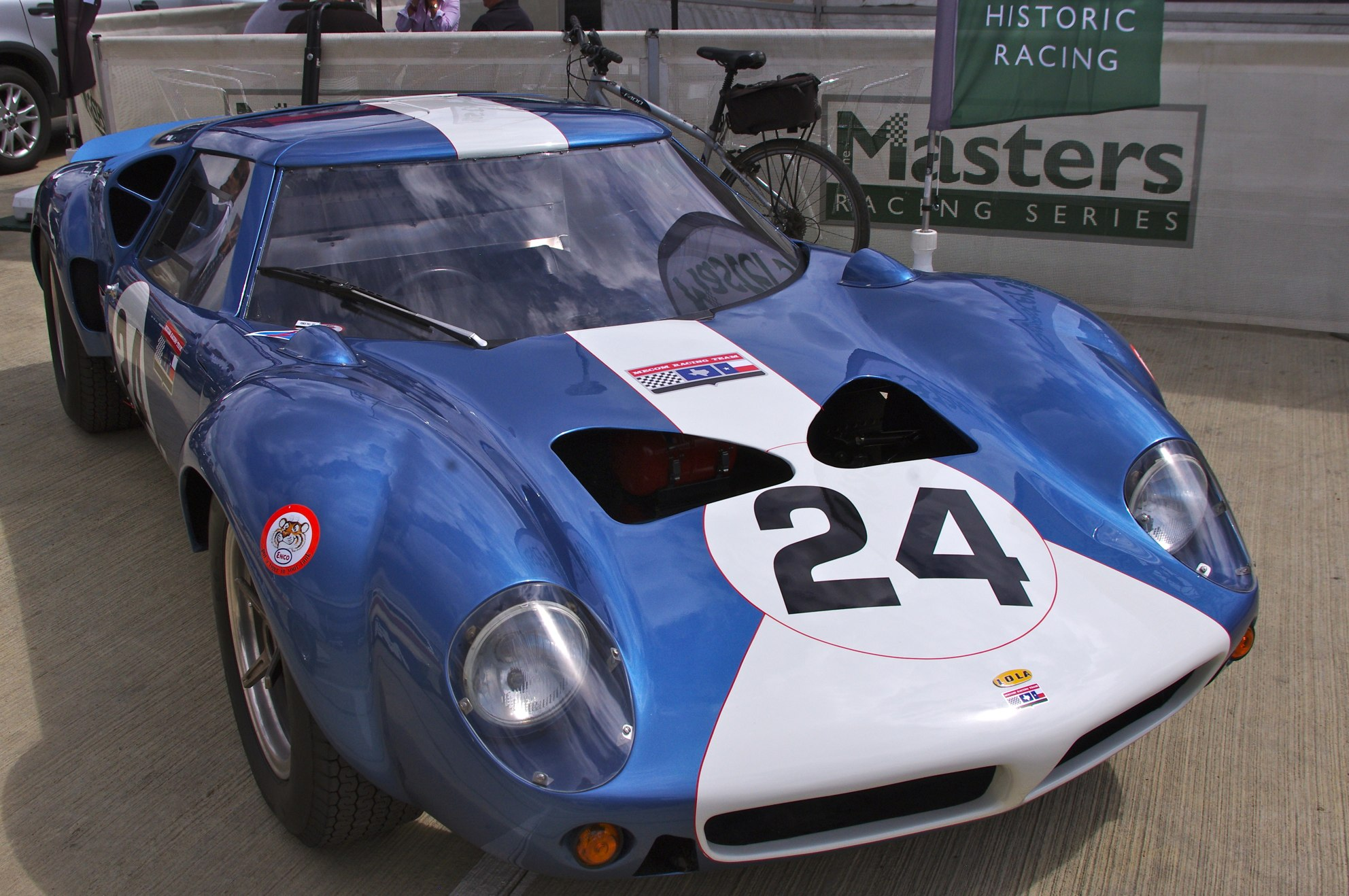
- "Mecom Racing Team" Lola Mk6 GT (# LGT-2) at Silverstone Classic 2011
- Category: Experimental Grand Touring
- Constructor: Lola Cars
- Designers: Eric Broadley (chassis); John Frayling (coachwork)
- Successor: Ford GT40; Lola T70

Technical specifications
- Chassis: Aluminium monocoque (steel monocoque for prototype car)
- Suspension (front): Double wishbones
- Suspension (rear): Double wishbones
- Length: 3,912 mm (154.0 in)
- Width: 1,600 mm (63.0 in)
- Height: 1,016 mm (40.0 in)
- Wheelbase: 2,356 mm (92.8 in)
- Engine: Ford Motor Company, 289 cu in (4.74 L) (later Chevy 6 L (366 cu in)) pushrod V8 NA mid-mounted
- Transmission: Colotti Tipo 37 4 speed manual
- Weight: 950 kg (2,094.4 lb)

Competition history
- Notable entrants: Lola Racing Cars; Mecom Racing Team
- Notable drivers: Tony Maggs; Richard Attwood; David Hobbs; Augie Pabst; Roger Penske
- Debut: Silverstone, 11 May 1963
Races	Wins
12	1

The Lola Mk6 GT was a racing car with a production run of only three vehicles, built between 1962 and 1963 by British car manufacturer Lola Cars. With its 289 cu in (4.74 L) Ford V8 engine, following the ideas of John Tojeiro in his 1962 Buick engined EE, the Mk6 GT was the next mid-mounted, high displacement V8-powered Grand Touring car, a chassis arrangement that had been used, up until that time, only on formula cars and smaller, more affordable GTs.

== Development ==
Rear mid-engined cars were introduced into Grand Prix racing in 1923 by the Tropfenwagen (de:Benz-Tropfenwagen) of Benz resp. Mercedes-Benz from where Ferdinand Porsche took the concept to the 1934-1939 Auto Union racing cars. The 1946-51 Porsche 360 design for a Cisitalia Grand Prix did not race in Grand Prix Formula One, but 1.5-litre Porsche 550 and Porsche 718 sportscars did enter as Formula 2 in the late 1950s.

While the 1936 Auto Union Type C had a 500+hp supercharged 6 litre V16, nobody put a big engine with more than 2.5 liter capacity behind the drivers until the 1960s. The 1950s Porsche only had the 1.5 litre 4-cyl Porsche 547 engine bored out to 2.0 litre and 190 hp. While the flat-8 Porsche 753 engine was made in 1962 for 1.5-litre-era F1, even in 1968 its larger Type 771 flat-8 sportscar variant had no more than 270 hp out of 2.2 liter.

Grand Tourers were accepted to race as GT only if a minimum production run had been completed: not a single manufacturer was keen on making a big investment to build cars "at a minimum rate of one hundred identical units as far as mechanical parts and coachwork are concerned in 12 consecutive months", as required by the FIA/CSI, without having the necessary experience with such applications and the right components. Cooper started winning F1 races with 2.5 liter mid-engine cars in 1958, and won consecutive F1 World Championships in 1959 and 1959. Ferrari had hesitated to accept the concept, adopting it first in V6-powered single seaters, and even later in sportscar racing, and as late as the 1970s in V12 road cars.

Even though Hewland and others modified Volkswagen or Porsche gearboxes, cars with engine sizes well under 2 litre, in those days there was no commonly available transaxle gearbox capable of managing the enormous torque provided by big V8 engines. When the Colotti Tipo 37 gearbox was made available to the market after being specifically built to be mounted on the 256 cu in (4.20 L) Ford Indy V8-powered Lotus 29 single seater intended to race in the 1963 Indianapolis 500 Lola's owner Eric Broadley had the opportunity to solve the problem.

Moreover, the FIA's decision to terminate its World Sports Car Championship and replace it with the new International Championship for GT Manufacturers for the 1962 season, in order to focus manufacturers' attention on Grand Tourers, made it more difficult for mid-engined GT cars to make their way into production. But the Federation left an open door to research and development, admitting to races Experimental Grand Touring cars (GTX, later known as Prototypes), with no minimum production requirement, but requiring roadworthiness. The Lola Mk6 GT was conceived by Eric Broadley at the end of 1962 to be accepted into the Experimental Grand Touring class.

== Technical description ==
The Mk6 GT featured some of the best technology of the time: first of all an aluminium monocoque (although the prototype car had a steel monocoque in order to save development time), while all opponents, apart from Jaguar, still relied on a space frame chassis. The Ford-Colotti engine-gearbox assembly was a stressed member and the rear suspension was mounted directly on it, a technique that did not appear in full on Formula 1 cars until the Lotus 49 in 1967. As a result the car was so compact that the wheelbase was even shorter than Lola's formula cars, despite using a large 400 hp (300 kW) pushrod V8 engine.

The coachwork, designed by John Frayling and made by FRP, had its own features such as reduced overhangs, Kamm-tail, roof-integrated engine air intake and special doors which extended into the roof to give the drivers greater access to the cockpit once they were open, an idea that was kept on the car's successor, the Ford GT40.

== Racing history ==
The prototype car (chassis LGT-P, steel monocoque) was shown to the public in January 1963 at the UK Olympia Racing Car Show, making a big success and provoking great expectations, and during the following months South African Tony Maggs raced it at Silverstone (finishing fifth after starting last on the grid) and at the Nürburgring 1000 km (retiring for technical reasons). After Nürburgring, LGT-P was retired. In 1965, it was sold to Allen Grant for $3,000 and 57 years later, the recently restored LGT-P is still owned by Mr Grant.

While LGT-P was being raced, a second car (chassis LGT-1, aluminium monocoque) was being completed and prepared for the 1963 24 Hours of Le Mans. Short of preparation time, Broadley himself brought LGT-1 to Le Mans at the very last moment for technical verification, which required some modifications to the car. After their completion the car was allowed to race, but the time spent couldn't be used for proper testing. The car raced with the wrong gear ratios and so was not able to show all of its potential: drivers didn't use full throttle on the long Mulsanne Straight to avoid overrevving, giving a top speed 30 mph (48 km/h) lower than predicted, and was forced to retire after 15 hours following an accident due to a gear selector failure. Understanding the potential performance of the Mk6, the Ford Motor Company bought it so as to further test its capabilities, laying the foundation for its GT40 project and involving Broadley himself, although he later left the program.

Meanwhile, a third car was completed, the second aluminium monocoque (chassis LGT-2). It was not raced at Le Mans that year because it was not ready, but was sold to the American Mecom Racing Team who raced it at Brands Hatch, where the Ford engine broke after only four laps. Replaced by a Traco-tuned 6 L (370 cu in) Chevrolet V8 delivering 530 hp (395 kW) at 6500 rpm, the car was extensively raced in North America and won the 1963 Bahamas Speed Week
