= Bahamas Speed Week =

The Bahamas Speed Week was an annual motor racing meeting held at Nassau in The Bahamas from 1954 to 1966.

== History ==
First held in 1954 on the Windsor Field Road Course in Nassau, the inaugural event was titled as the Nassau Trophy Road Races. Masten Gregory won the main race, the Nassau Trophy, in a Ferrari 375 MM. The 1956 meeting was promoted as the Third Annual International Bahamas Speed Week. For 1957, the meeting was moved to another airfield location, the 5-mile (8.0 km) anti-clockwise Oakes Field Course, which was closer to the main population areas on the island. For 1958 onwards, the circuit was shortened to 4.5-mile (7.2 km) and the circuit was run in clockwise direction.

Due to needed track repairs and the lack of additional funding by the Bahamian government, as well as competition from more races running in December, the event was discontinued after the 1966 edition.

The success of the Bahamas Speed Week led to the creation of other events in the Caribbean, like the Cuban Grand Prix and the Puerto Rico Grand Prix.

== Nassau Trophy ==
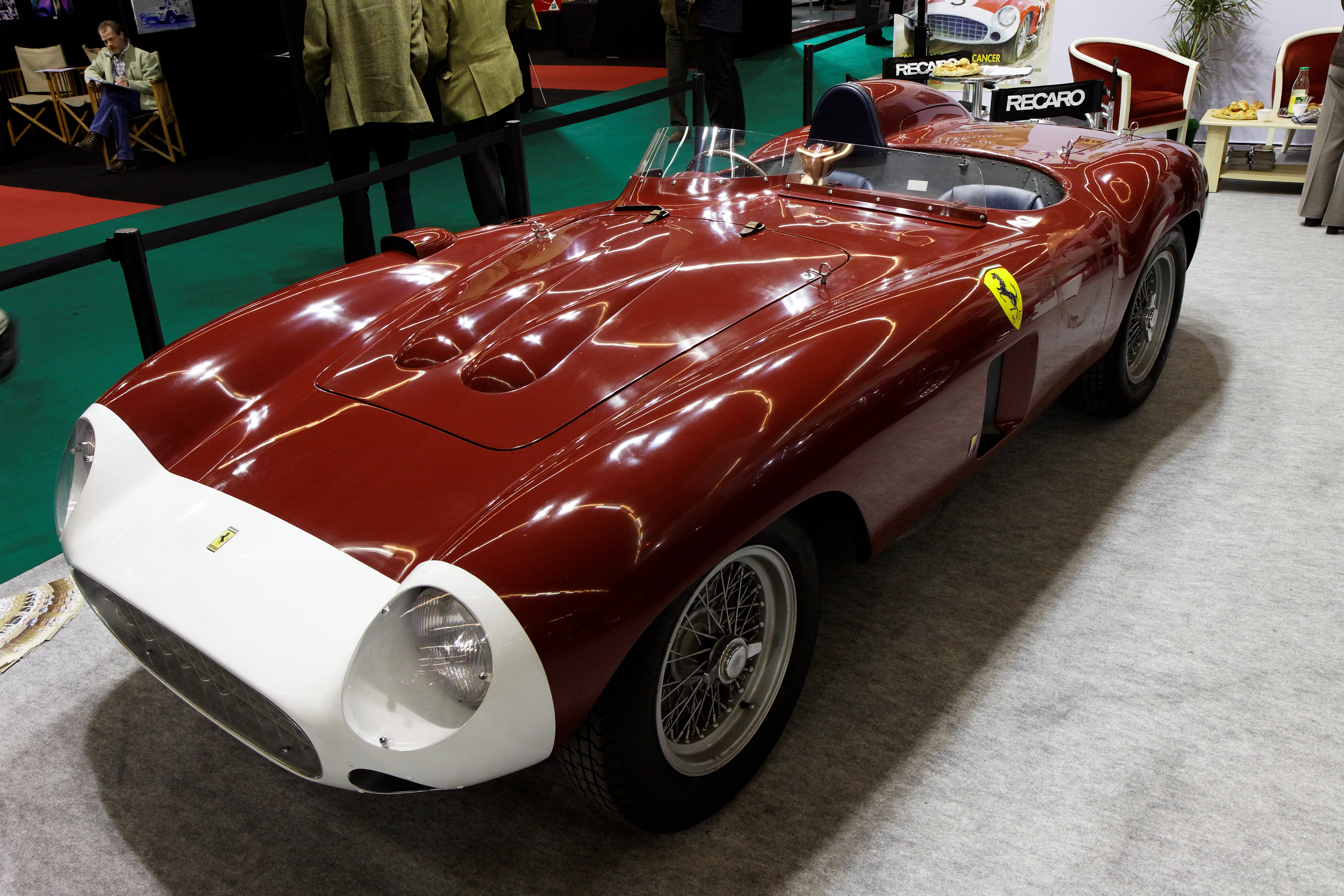
A Ferrari 857 S, similar to the example driven to victory by Phil Hill in the 1955 Nassau Trophy

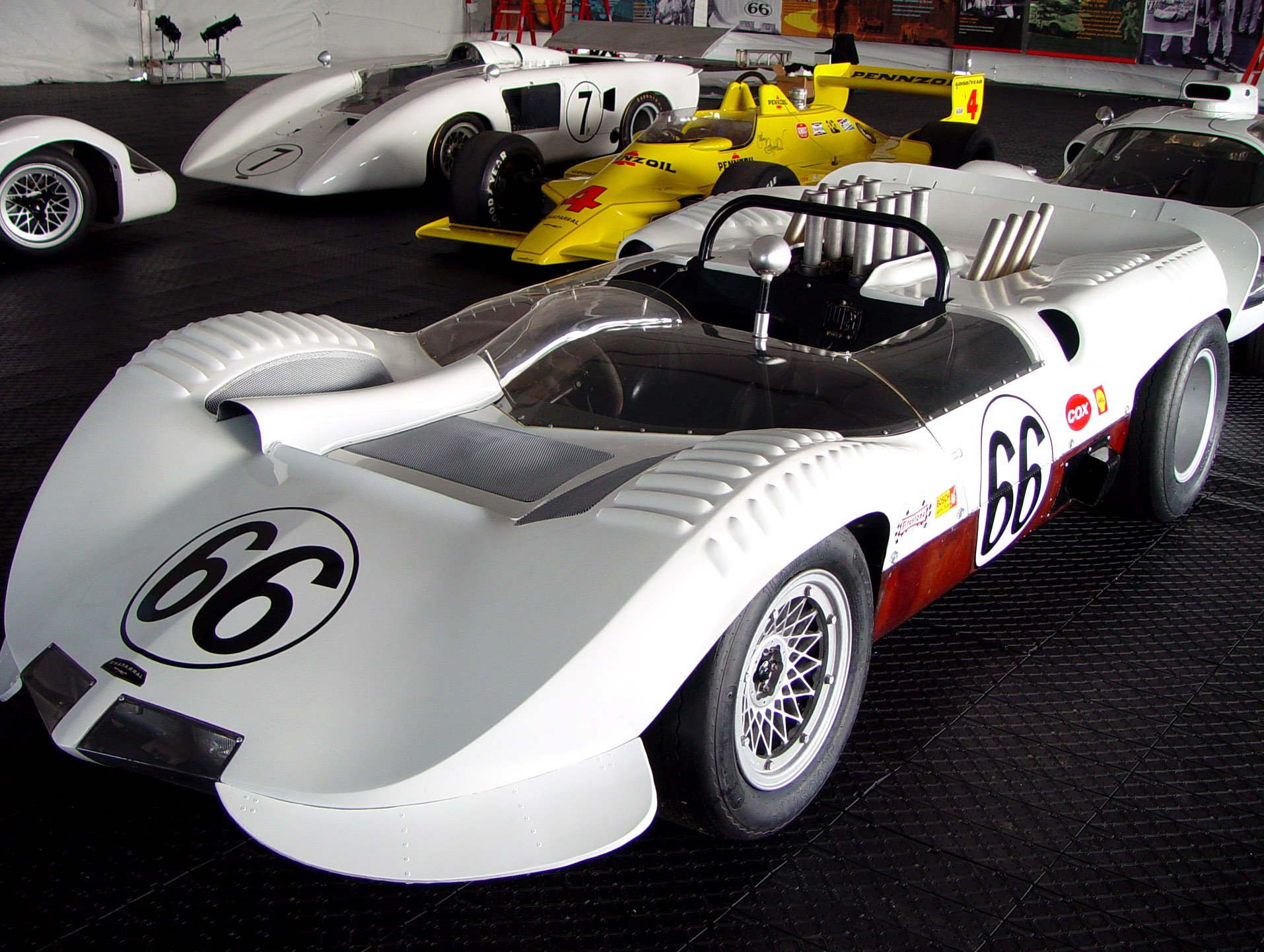
Hap Sharp and Roger Penske won the 1964 Nassau Trophy driving the Chaparral 2A. Sharp also won the 1965 race in the same car.

The following table lists the winners of the Nassau Trophy, the feature race at each of the 13 Speed Week meetings.

Year	Winning driver	Car
Windsor Field
1954	(United States) Masten Gregory	Ferrari 375 MM
1955	(United States) Phil Hill	Ferrari 857 S
1956	(United Kingdom) Stirling Moss	Maserati 300S
Oakes Field
1957	(United Kingdom) Stirling Moss	Ferrari 290 MM
1958	(United States) Lance Reventlow, (United States) Chuck Daigh	Scarab Mk I Chevrolet
1959	(United States) George Constantine	Aston Martin DBR2/420
1960	(United States) Dan Gurney	Lotus 19 Coventry Climax
1961	(United States) Dan Gurney	Lotus 19 Coventry Climax
1962	(United Kingdom) Innes Ireland	Lotus 19 Coventry Climax
1963	(United States) A. J. Foyt	Scarab Mk IV Chevrolet
1964	(United States) Hap Sharp, (United States) Roger Penske	Chaparral 2A Chevrolet
1965	(United States) Hap Sharp	Chaparral 2A Chevrolet
1966	(United States) Mark Donohue	Lola T70 Mk.2 Chevrolet

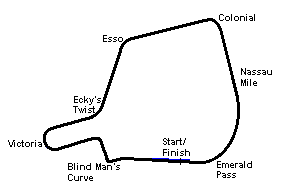
Windsor Field (1954-1956)

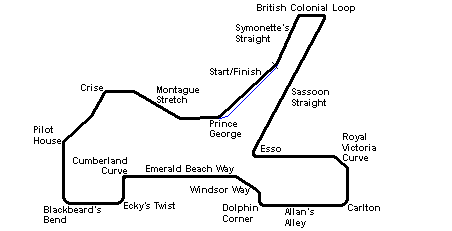
Oakes Field (1957)

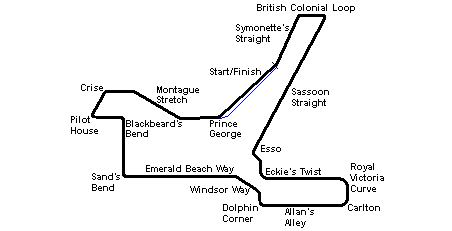
Oakes Field (1958-1966)

== Bahamas Speed Week Revival ==
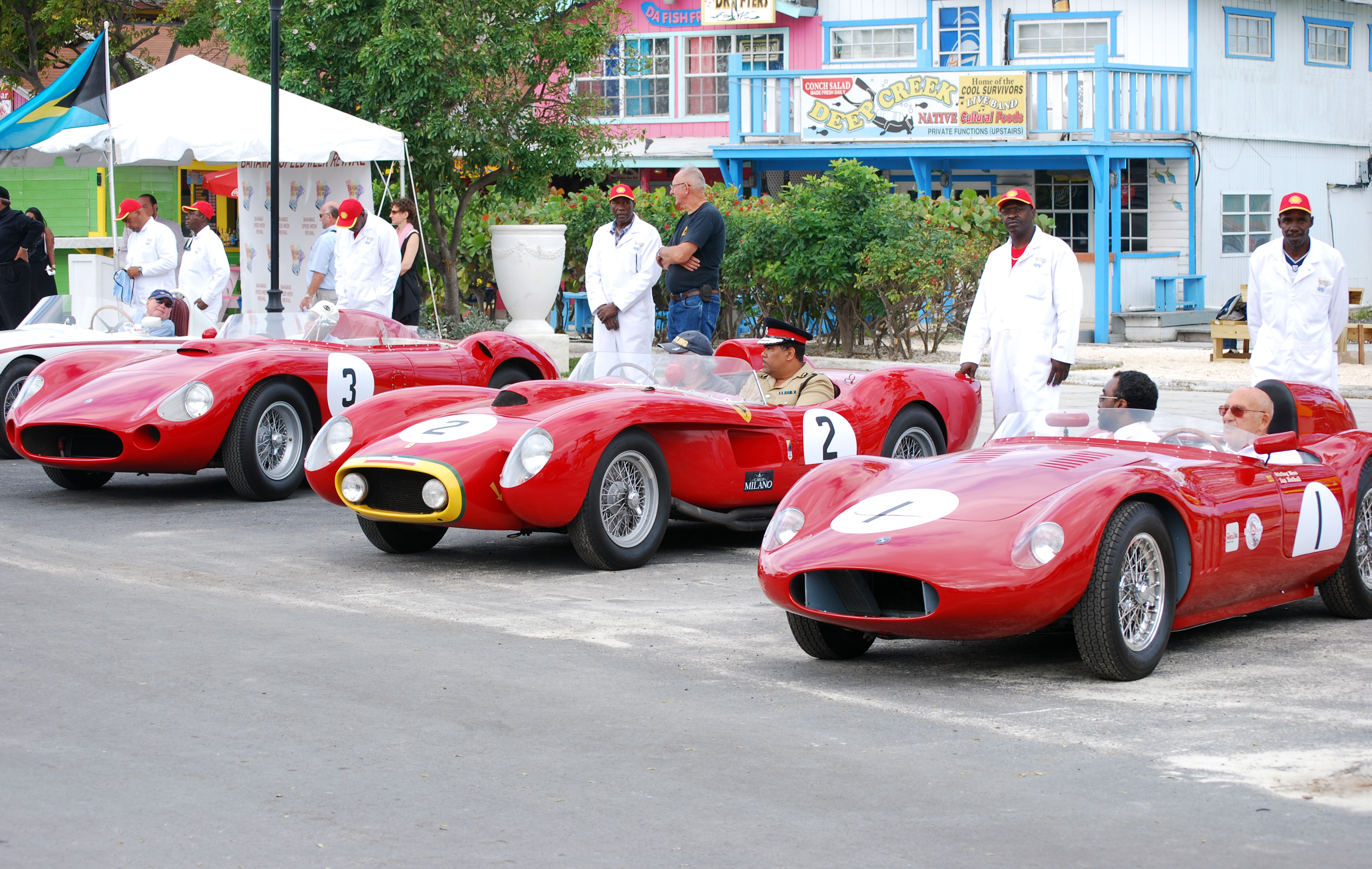
Lineup of main contenders in the 2011 Bahamas Speed Week Revival. In the foreground Stirling Moss in his Morelli-bodied O.S.C.A. FS 372.

Since 2011 the Bahamas Speed Week Revival has taken place along the beach at Nassau and down from the harbor. Cars range from vintage racers to new vehicles that now race in a time trials format.

The First Speed Week Revival covered five days and included a Revival Island Tour, Street Course Demonstration, Drag Racing, Concours d’Elegance, Road Show, Fashion Show and Charity Ball.

== Bibliography ==
- O'Neil, Terry (2006). The Bahamas Speed Weeks. Dorchester: Veloce Publishing. ISBN 978-1-84584-018-1.
- O'Neil, Terry (2013). The Bahamas Speed Weeks: Revised Edition Including the Revival Meetings. Deerfield, IL: Dalton Watson Fine Books. ISBN 978-1-85443-268-1.
