= Continuation car =

A continuation car is a replica of a vehicle no longer in production by the original automaker. These cars are built according to the original standards and blueprints, although sometimes the term is also used to refer to vehicles featuring different mechanical parts (a more modern engine, for instance). Continuations of the Ford GT40 and AC Cobra are relatively common, though expensive, due to the manual labour involved in production. The first continuation car was probably the Avanti II.

== See also ==
- Kit car
