= 1965 Lavant Cup =

Race details
- Date: 19 April 1965
- Location: Goodwood Circuit, West Sussex
- Course: Permanent racing facility
- Course length: 3.862 km (2.4 miles)
- Distance: 21 laps, 81.1 km (50.4 miles)

Pole position
Driver	(New Zealand) Bruce McLaren	McLaren-Elva
- Time: 1:19.4

Fastest lap
Driver	(United Kingdom) Jim Clark	Lotus
- Time: 1:20.8

Podium
First	(United Kingdom) Jim Clark	Lotus
Second	(New Zealand) Bruce McLaren	McLaren-Elva
Third	(United Kingdom) David Hobbs	Lola

The 1965 Lavant Cup was a sports car racing event held on 19 April 1965 at Goodwood Circuit, West Sussex. The race was run over 21 laps of the circuit and was won by British driver Jim Clark in a Lotus 30-Ford, setting fastest lap in the process. Pole-setter Bruce McLaren finished second in a McLaren-Elva Mk1--Oldsmobile, and David Hobbs finished third in a Lola T70-Ford.

In the lower classes, Denny Hulme won the 2.0 litre class in a Brabham BT8-Climax, and John Hine won the 1.15 litre class in a Lotus 23-Ford.

== Results ==
Pos	No.	Driver	Entrant	Constructor	Time/Retired	Grid
1	33	(United Kingdom) Jim Clark	Team Lotus	Lotus 30-Ford	29:14.0; 166.471kph	2
2	35	(New Zealand) Bruce McLaren	Bruce McLaren Motor Racing	McLaren-Elva Mk1--Oldsmobile	+20.0s	1
3	32	(United Kingdom) David Hobbs	Harold Young Ltd.	Lola T70-Ford	+1:24.4	9
4	38	(United Kingdom) Hugh Dibley	R.F. Pierpoint	Lola T70-Chevrolet	20 laps	4
5	41	(New Zealand) Denny Hulme	Sidney Taylor Racing	Brabham BT8-Climax	20 laps	3
6	42	(United Kingdom) Tommy Hitchcock	Celerity Inc.	Brabham BT8-Climax	20 laps	5
7	36	(United Kingdom) John Coundley	John Coundley Racing Enterprises	McLaren-Elva Mk1--Oldsmobile	19 laps	12
8	52	(United Kingdom) John Hine	John Hine Cars Ltd.	Lotus 23-Ford	19 laps	17
9	54	(United Kingdom) Jim Morley	J.F. Morley	Lotus 23-Ford	18 laps	18
10	49	(United Kingdom) Robin Widdows	Barwell Motors Ltd.	Lotus 23B-Ford	18 laps	23
11	56	(United Kingdom) Robert Lamplough	Robert Lamplough	Lotus 23-Ford	18 laps	16
12	48	(United Kingdom) Jeremy Bouckley	Burgess & Garfield Limited	Merlyn MK6-Ford	17 laps	24
13	59	(United Kingdom) Jack Murrell	D.R.W. Motor & Engineering Co.	DRW-Imp	17 laps	22
14	57	(United Kingdom) Robin McArthur	McArthur Weston Racing	Lotus 23-Ford	17 laps	20
15	43	(United Kingdom) Chris Williams	Chris Williams Ltd.	Lotus 23B-BMW	17 laps	10
16	50	(United Kingdom) Trevor Taylor	Aurora Gear (Racing) Rotherham	Aurora-BMC	15 laps	19
17	37	(United Kingdom) Julian Sutton	Mills Garages (Sutherland) Ltd.	Attila-Chevrolet	14 laps, not running	14
NC	51	(United Kingdom) Jack Paterson	Auto Racing Tours	Lola Mk 1-Climax	7 laps	25
Ret	53	(United Kingdom) Harry Stiller	Scaradi Racing	Lotus 23-Ford	10 laps	15
Ret	58	(United Kingdom) Geoff Oliver	Geoff Oliver Racing	Lotus 23-Ford	5 laps	13
Ret	47	(United States) Bob Bondurant	Race Proved by Willment	Elva Mk VIII-BMW	4 laps	11
Ret	45	(New Zealand) Chris Amon	Bruce McLaren Motor Racing	Elva Mk VIII-BMW	3 laps	8
Ret	55	(United Kingdom) Brian Smith	B.D.L.R. Smith	Lotus 23-Ford	2 laps	21
Ret	39	(United Kingdom) Roger Nathan	Roger Nathan (Racing) Ltd.	Brabham BT8-Oldsmobile	1 lap	7
DNS	31	(United Kingdom) John Surtees	Team Surtees Ltd.	Lola T70-Chevrolet	Engine failure in practice	-
DNS	40	(United Kingdom) Roy Salvadori	Ford Advanced Vehicles Ltd.	Cooper T78-Ford		6
