= 1961 Lavant Cup =

Race details
- Date: 3 April 1961
- Official name: XIII Lavant Cup
- Location: Goodwood Circuit, West Sussex
- Course: Permanent racing facility
- Course length: 3.862 km (2.400 mi)
- Distance: 21 laps, 81.094 km (50.389 mi)

Pole position
Driver	(New Zealand) Bruce McLaren	Cooper-Climax
- Time: 1:24.2

Fastest lap
Driver	(New Zealand) Bruce McLaren	Cooper-Climax
- Time: 1:30.4

Podium
First	(United Kingdom) Stirling Moss	Cooper-Climax
Second	(New Zealand) Bruce McLaren	Cooper-Climax
Third	(United Kingdom) Graham Hill	BRM

The 13th Lavant Cup was an Intercontinental Formula motor race held on 3 April 1961 at Goodwood Circuit, West Sussex. The race was run over 21 laps of the circuit, and was won by British driver Stirling Moss in a Cooper T53-Climax. Bruce McLaren started from pole, set fastest lap and finished second in another T53. Graham Hill was third in a BRM P48. The event was held on the same day as the 1961 Pau Grand Prix, which compromised the quality of the entry at both meetings.

== Results ==
Pos	No.	Driver	Entrant	Constructor	Time/Retired	Grid
1	6	(United Kingdom) Stirling Moss	R.R.C. Walker Racing Team	Cooper T53-Climax	33:25.6, 145.56kph	2
2	14	(New Zealand) Bruce McLaren	C.T. Atkins	Cooper T53-Climax	+0.6s	1
3	4	(United Kingdom) Graham Hill	Owen Racing Organisation	BRM P48	+19.4s	3
4	10	(United Kingdom) John Surtees	Yeoman Credit Racing Team	Cooper T53-Climax	+1:00.8	6
5	8	(United Kingdom) Roy Salvadori	Yeoman Credit Racing Team	Cooper T53-Climax	+1:16.4	7
6	2	(United Kingdom) Tony Brooks	Owen Racing Organisation	BRM P48	+1:17.6	4
7	19	(United States) Dan Gurney	Mrs. Louise Bryden-Brown	Lotus 18-Climax	20 laps, accident	5
8	12	(United States) Chuck Daigh	Reventlow Automobiles Ltd.	Scarab-Meyer-Drake	+1 lap	8
9	16	(United Kingdom) Geoff Richardson	G.N. Richardson	Cooper-Alta	+2 laps	9

Previous race: 1961 Pau Grand Prix	Formula One non-championship races 1961 season	Next race: 1961 Brussels Grand Prix
Previous race: 1960 Lavant Cup	Lavant Cup	Next race: 1962 Lavant Cup
