= Lavant Cup =

- Goodwood Circuit

Race information
- Number of times held: 18
- First held: 1949
- Last held: 1966
- Most wins (drivers): (United Kingdom) Roy Salvadori (3)
- Most wins (constructors): (United Kingdom) Cooper Car Company (9)
- Circuit length: 3.809 km (2.367 miles)

Last race (1966)

Pole position
- (United Kingdom) Mike Beckwith; Willment-BRM

Podium
- 1. (United Kingdom) Mike Spence; Parnell-BRM; 30:55.6; 2. (United Kingdom) Tony Dean; Brabham-Climax; +5.0s; 3. (United Kingdom) Mac Daghorn; Felday-BRM; +9.8s

Fastest lap
- (United Kingdom) Mike Spence; Parnell-BRM; 1:24.4

The Lavant Cup was a motor race held in the spring at Goodwood, England from 1949 to 1966. Over the years it was variously run for Formula 2, Formula 1 and, finally, Sports car racing classes, with the latter counting towards the British Sports Car Championship. The trophy is named for the near-by parish and villages of Lavant, which also give their name to the Lavant Straight on the circuit itself.

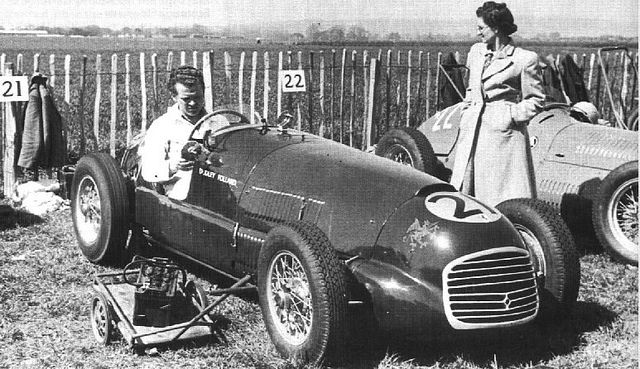
Dudley Folland in his 1949 race-winning Ferrari 166 SC

In recent years the race has been revived as a historic racing event, forming a part of the Goodwood SpeedWeek meeting.

== Winners ==
Year	Winner	Car	Report
1949	(United Kingdom) Dudley Folland	Ferrari 166 SC	Report
1950	(United Kingdom) Bill Aston	Cooper T9-JAP	Report
1951	(United Kingdom) Stirling Moss	HWM-Alta	Report
1952	(United Kingdom) Mike Hawthorn	Cooper T20-Bristol	Report
1953	(Switzerland) Emmanuel de Graffenried	Maserati A6GCM	Report
1954	(United Kingdom) Reg Parnell	Ferrari 625	Report
1955	(United Kingdom) Roy Salvadori	Connaught Type A	Report
1956	(United Kingdom) Roy Salvadori	Cooper T39-Climax	Report
1957	(United Kingdom) Tony Brooks	Cooper T41-Climax	Report
1958	(Australia) Jack Brabham	Cooper T43-Climax	Report
1959	(Australia) Jack Brabham	Cooper T45-Climax	Report
1960	(United Kingdom) Innes Ireland	Lotus 18-Climax	Report
1961	(United Kingdom) Stirling Moss	Cooper T53-Climax	Report
1962	(New Zealand) Bruce McLaren	Cooper T55-Climax	Report
1963	(United Kingdom) Roy Salvadori	Cooper T61-Climax	Report
1964	(United Kingdom) John Coundley	Lotus 19-Climax	Report
1965	(United Kingdom) Jim Clark	Lotus 30-Ford	Report
1966	(United Kingdom) Mike Spence	Parnell-BRM	Report
