= Zerex Special =

Zerex Special Cooper-Oldsmobile
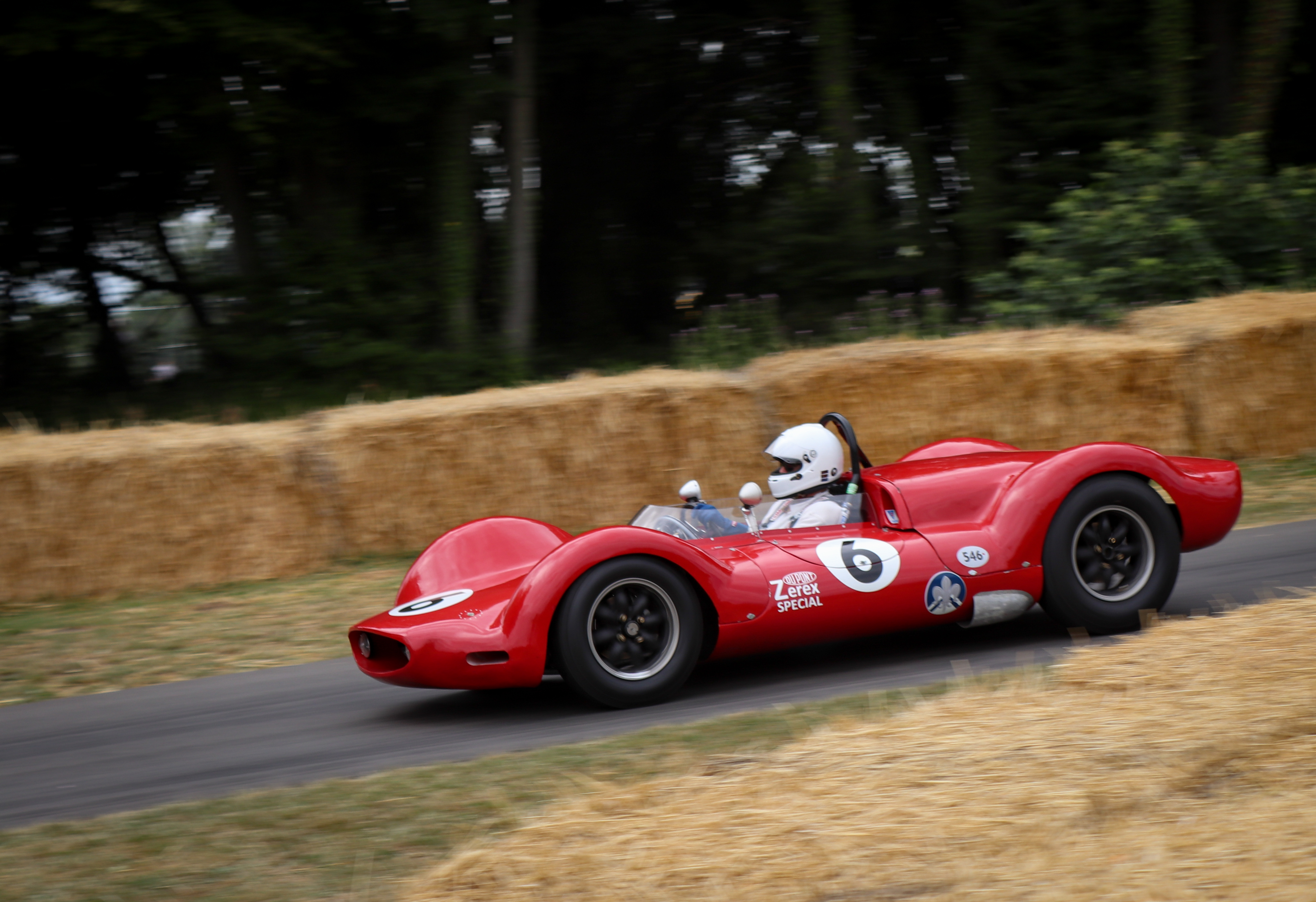
- Zerex Special at Goodwood Festival of Speed in 2019
- Constructor: Cooper Car Company (originally)
- Designers: Roy Gane; Bob Webb; Harry Miller; Tony Hilder
- Predecessor: Cooper T53

Technical specifications
- Engine: 1962-1964: Coventry Climax FPF 2,751 cc (167.9 cu in) I4, naturally-aspirated, mid-engined 1964 onwards: Traco-Oldsmobile 3,500 cc (213.6 cu in) V8, naturally-aspirated

Competition history
- Debut: 1962 Los Angeles Times Grand Prix
Races	Wins
25	10
- Drivers' Championships: 2: (1962 USAC Road Racing Championship, 1963 SCCA National Sports Car Championship, Class D Modified)

The Zerex Special (Bruce McLaren called it the Cooper Oldsmobile and did not refer to it as a McLaren, and it was also nicknamed the Jolly Green Giant) was a sports racing car. Originally a Cooper T53 built for the 1961 United States Grand Prix, it was rebuilt for usage in American sports car racing, and featured open-top bodywork. Initially using a 2.75-litre version of the Coventry Climax FPF straight-four engine, it later used a Traco-Oldsmobile 3.5-litre V8. The car won numerous races throughout its four-year career, being driven by drivers such as McLaren and Roger Penske.

== Design development and ownership history ==
In 1961, Cooper Car Company constructed chassis F1-16-61 for the United States Grand Prix. Built to the T53 specification, the car was driven by Walt Hansgen, who competed with Briggs Cunningham's team. However, he crashed out of the race after 14 laps, becoming the second driver to retire from the race. The wreck was sold by Cunningham to Roger Penske, who replaced the damaged chassis tubing and added full-width enveloping bodywork and named the car the Zerex Special. Penske would then use the car in Formula Libre races that year, and Timmy Mayer would do the same in 1962. Sold to Bruce McLaren in 1964, the car was rebuilt with a widened chassis. A 2.75-litre Coventry Climax FPF straight-four engine was used in the new car, which was officially known as the Zerex Special, and unofficially as the Jolly Green Giant. In 1964, Bruce McLaren purchased the car, and replaced the chassis with a tube frame unit of his own design, as well as fitting a 3.5-litre Traco-Oldsmobile V8 engine in place of the Cooper Climax unit; as a result, he named it the Cooper-Oldsmobile. The car was sold again at the end of the 1964 season to Dave Morgan, who would use it for a further two years. At the end of the 1966 season, Leo Barboza purchased the car, and used it in Venezuela.

== Racing history ==
=== 1962 ===
The Zerex Special's first appearance came towards the end of the 1962 season, at the Los Angeles Times Grand Prix (the fourth round of the USAC Road Racing Championship) in October; Roger Penske, driving for Updraught Enterprises, won the race by 14 seconds from Jim Hall and his Chaparral 1. Penske then competed in the Pacific Grand Prix, and took second behind Dan Gurney's Lotus 19 Climax in the first race, before repeating the feat in the second race, this time behind the Lotus 19 of Lloyd Ruby. However, Gurney had retired from the second race due to a gear shaft problem, resulting in Penske taking the overall win. Penske then entered the Zerex Special privately at the Grand Prix de Puerto Rico, and this time won the race by three laps from the Cooper Climax of Timmy Mayer. Penske took the 1962 USAC Road Racing Championship title (he had previously used the car in Cooper T53 form in the first two races), beating Gurney by 60 points.

=== 1963 ===
The USAC Road Racing Championship folded at the end of the 1962 season, so Penske drove the car for John Mecom's Mecom Racing Team in the SCCA National Sports Car Championship instead. He started 1963 in the same way that he'd finished the previous year; taking the victory, this time at Marlboro Motor Raceway, beating Bob Holbert's Porsche 718 RSK into second place. Penske skipped the second round, and instead his next entry came at the Greater Cumberland Regional Airport round; another victory, this time ahead of Hansgen's Cooper Monaco Climax, followed. Penske then partnered Hap Sharp in the second round of the United States Road Racing Championship (USRRC), held at Pensacola Airport Course; the car's unbeaten streak finally ended, as an oil pressure issue forced the pair out after 74 laps. Penske then drove the Zerex Special in a round of the Canadian Sports Car Championship, held at Mosport Park; he took fourth, and was the last car on the lead lap. He then returned to the SCCA series, for the Road America round, but retired due to a blown engine after 24 laps.

A trip to Europe for the Guards Trophy at Brands Hatch followed; Penske took the win, finishing ahead of Roy Salvadori and his Cooper Monaco. The Road America 500, however, would prove rather less successful, as Penske retired. Next up was the race where the car had taken its debut win; the Los Angeles Times Grand Prix. This time, however, Dave MacDonald won the race in a Cooper King Cobra Ford, and Penske finished second, a lap behind. An aborted attempt at entering the Pacific Grand Prix followed, instead, Augie Pabst was the next person to drive the car, retiring from the Nassau Trophy after 26 laps, and being classified in 41st position. Penske had also driven a Ferrari 250 GTO in the USRRC, and was classified in joint-18th, with six points; level with Chuck Cassel, Charlie Kolb, Don Sesslar, Jerry Titus and Enus Wilson. However, he also won the Class D Modified category of the SCCA National Sports Car Championship.

=== 1964 ===
In 1964, the car was bought by Bruce McLaren, who ran it with his own Bruce McLaren Motor Racing team. The Cooper-Oldsmobile's debut came in the second round of the British Sports Car Championship, held at Oulton Park; however, an oil pressure issue after nine laps forced him to retire. Things would be rather different at the next round, held at Aintree; he won by 24 seconds from Jim Clark's Lotus 30 Ford, despite being in a lower category. The fourth round, held at Silverstone, saw McLaren take another win; this time, from Roy Salvadori's Cooper Monaco Maserati. The car was finally rebuilt into the "Cooper-Oldsmobile" for McLaren's next race, which was in the Canadian Sports Car Championship at Mosport; he beat Penske's Chaparral 2A Chevrolet in the first race, and Pabst's Lola Mk.6 Chevrolet in the second, taking the overall victory as a result. McLaren returned to the UK, and won the Guards Trophy Brands Hatch; this time, beating fellow countryman Denny Hulme and his Brabham BT8 Climax by 42.4 seconds. McLaren then entered the RAC Tourist Trophy, but, having set the fastest lap, the clutch failed after 18 laps, and he was forced to retire.

=== 1965 ===
Dave Morgan purchased the car prior to the start of the 1965 season, and his first race with the car was a second place in a non-championship SCCA round, held at a track in Stuttgart, Arkansas. Morgan then ran the car in the Governor's Trophy, held at the Oakes Field Course in Nassau; he took sixth overall, fourth in the Sports 5000+ category, and fifth in the Over 2-litres division. Although Jackie Stewart was initially selected to drive the car in the Nassau Trophy, Morgan drove once more; this time, finishing ninth overall, and third in the Sports 5000+ category.

=== 1966 ===
Morgan retained the car in 1966, and his first race of the season came at a SCCA regional race, held at Green Valley Raceway; he finished second to the McLaren Elva of Joe Starkey. The Governor's Trophy & Nassau Tourist Trophy would prove to be rather less successful; he lasted five laps before retiring, and was classified in 41st. He would go on to take seventh at the Nassau Classic, and eleventh at the Nassau Trophy. This was the last known race of the car, as it was used in Venezuela by Leo Barboza after 1966.
