= 1957 Lavant Cup =

Race details
- Date: 22 April 1957
- Official name: VIII Lavant Cup
- Location: Goodwood Circuit, West Sussex
- Course: Permanent racing facility
- Course length: 3.863 km (2.408 miles)
- Distance: 12 laps, 46.356 km (28.900 miles)
- Attendance: 55,000

Pole position
Driver	(United Kingdom) Tony Brooks	Cooper

Fastest lap
Driver	(United Kingdom) Roy Salvadori	Cooper
- Time: 1:34.4

Podium
First	(United Kingdom) Tony Brooks	Cooper
Second	(Australia) Jack Brabham	Cooper
Third	(United Kingdom) Ron Flockhart	Lotus

The 8th Lavant Cup was a motor race, run to Formula Two rules, held on 22 April 1957 at Goodwood Circuit, West Sussex. The race was run over 12 laps, and was won from pole position by British driver Tony Brooks in a Cooper T41-Climax. Brooks had been penalised five seconds for jumping the start but still finished almost 18 seconds ahead of Jack Brabham in a Cooper T43-Climax. Ron Flockhart was third in a Lotus Eleven-Climax. Roy Salvadori set fastest lap in another Cooper T43-Climax but retired with clutch failure.

== Results ==
Pos.	No.	Driver	Entrant	Car	Time/Retired	Grid
1	17	(United Kingdom) Tony Brooks	R.R.C. Walker Racing Team	Cooper T41-Climax	19:26.0, 142.98kph	1
2	10	(Australia) Jack Brabham	Cooper Car Company	Cooper T43-Climax	+17.8s	4
3	23	(United Kingdom) Ron Flockhart	John Coombs	Lotus Eleven-Climax	12 laps	3
4	16	(United Kingdom) George Wicken	G. Wicken	Cooper T43-Climax	12 laps	10
5	25	(United Kingdom) Graham Hill	C.T. Atkins	Connaught Type A-Lea Francis	12 laps	7
Ret	28	(United States) Herbert Mackay-Fraser	Team Lotus	Lotus Eleven-Climax	9 laps, accident	5
Ret	14	(United Kingdom) Cliff Allison	Team Lotus	Lotus 12-Climax	3 laps, transmission	9
Ret	11	(United Kingdom) Roy Salvadori	Cooper Car Company	Cooper T43-Climax	3 laps, clutch	2
DNS	12	(United Kingdom) Colin Chapman	Team Lotus	Lotus 12-Climax		6
DNS	15	(United States) Herbert Mackay-Fraser	Team Lotus	Lotus 12-Climax	drove #28	8
