= 1962 International 100 =

Motor race staged in Australia in 1962

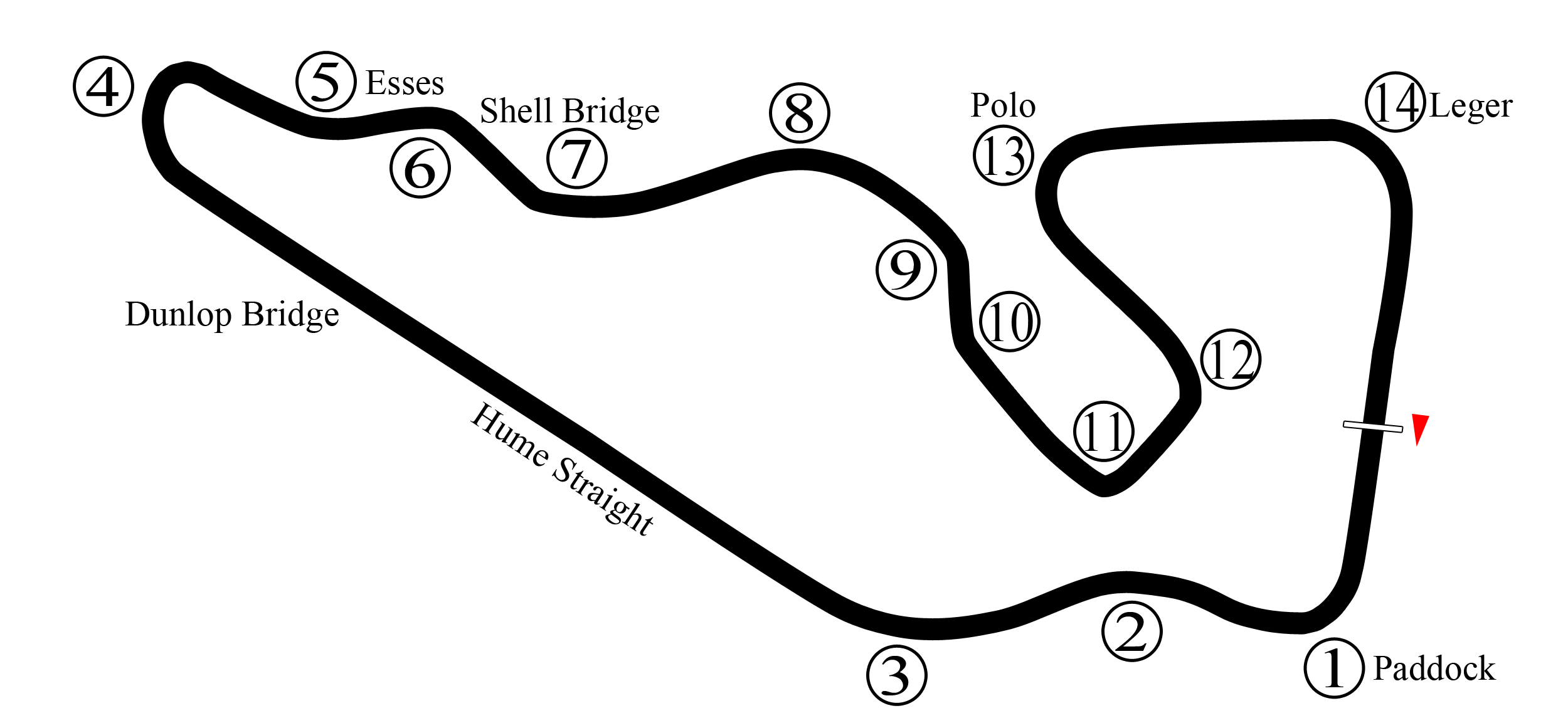
Layout of the Warwick Farm Raceway (1960-1973)

The 1962 International 100 was a motor race staged at the Warwick Farm Raceway in New South Wales, Australia on 4 February 1962. Contested as a Formula Libre race, it was staged over a distance of 101.25 miles (163 km) and was the second International 100 race to be held at Warwick Farm.

The race was won by Stirling Moss, driving a Cooper T53 Coventry Climax.

== Race results ==
Position	Driver	No.	Car	Entrant	Laps	Time / Remarks
1	Stirling Moss	7	Cooper T53 Coventry Climax	R. R. C. Walker Racing Team	45	1h 14m 36.6s
2	Bruce McLaren	10	Cooper T53 Coventry Climax	B. McLaren	45	1h 14m 56.8s
3	Bib Stillwell	6	Cooper T53 Coventry Climax	B. S. Stillwell	43	
4	Lorenzo Bandini	17	Cooper T53 Maserati	Scuderia Centro-Sud	43	
5	Ron Flockhart	8	Lotus 18 Coventry Climax	R. Flockhart	43	
6	Angus Hyslop	16	Cooper T53 Coventry Climax	A. Hyslop	43	
7	Lex Davison	4	Cooper T53 Coventry Climax	Bowmaker Yeoman Racing Team	36	
DNF	John Youl	5	Cooper T51 Coventry Climax	Scuderia Veloce	31	Clutch
DNF	Jack Brabham	1	Cooper T55 Coventry Climax	Ecurie Vitesse	21	Gearbox
DNF	John Surtees	2	Cooper T53 Coventry Climax	Bowmaker Yeoman Racing Team	21	Gearbox
DNF	Arnold Glass	9	BRM P48	Capital Motors	8	Overheating
DNS	David McKay	14	Cooper T51 Coventry Climax	Scuderia Veloce	-	
DNS	Leo Geoghegan	11	Lotus 20 Ford	Geoghegan Motors, Liverpool	-	Withdrew
DNS	Gavin Youl	12	MRD Ford	Scuderia Veloce	-	Withdrew
DNS	Austin Miller	15	Cooper T53 Chevrolet Corvette	A. Miller	-	
DNS	Roy Salvadori	3	Cooper T53 Coventry Climax	Bowmaker Yeoman Racing Team	-	Crashed in practice
DNS	Stirling Moss	7	Lotus 21 Coventry Climax	R. R. C. Walker Racing Team	-	Practice only
DNS	Lex Davison	18	Aston Martin DBR4/250	A. N. Davison	-	Practice only

=== Notes ===
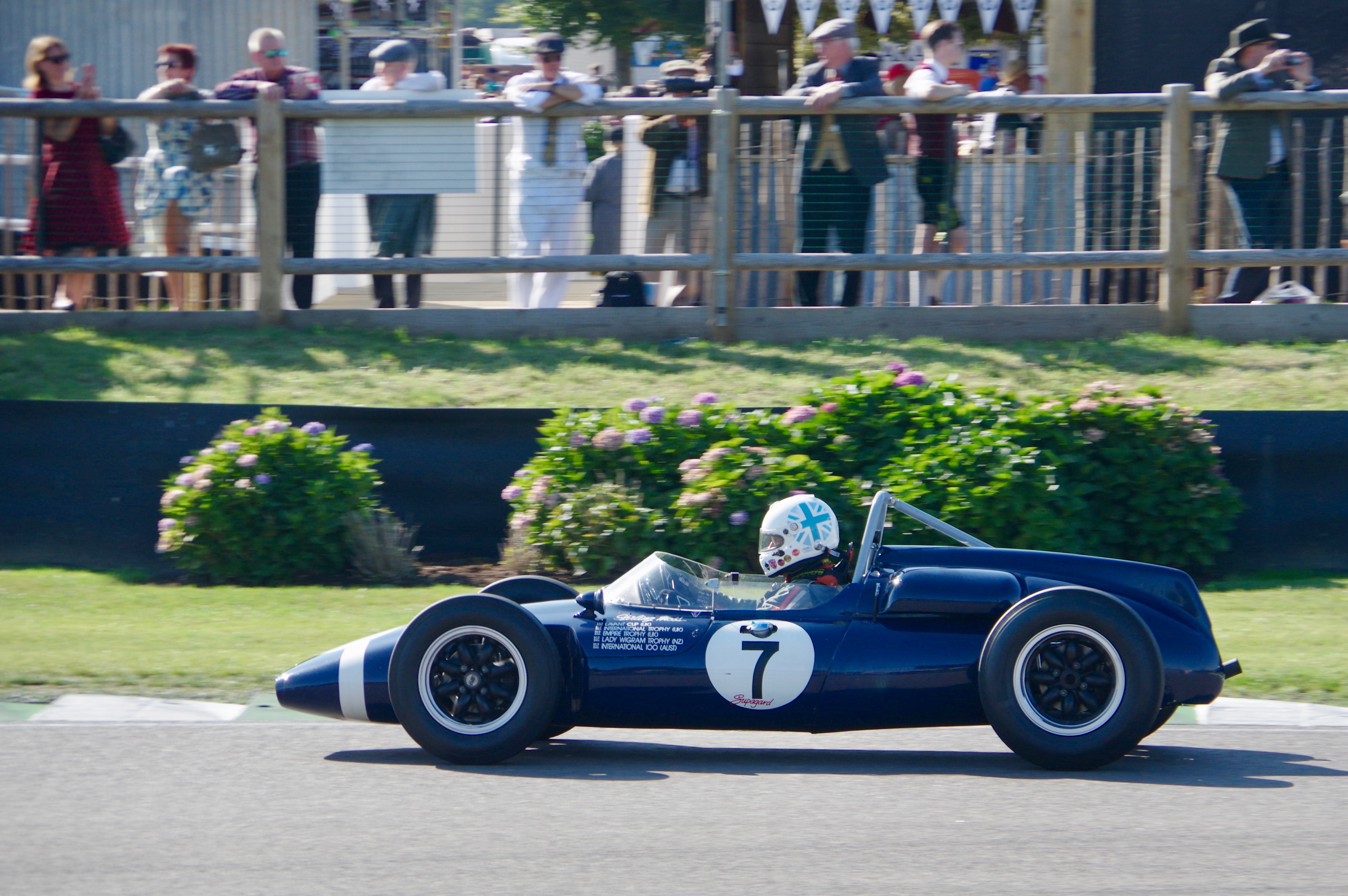
The winning Cooper T53, pictured in 2019

- Pole Position: Stirling Moss, 1:37.5
- Race distance: 45 laps (101.25 miles, 163 km)
- Entries: 17
- Starters: 11
- Finishers: 7
- Fastest lap: Bruce McLaren, 1:37.5
