= 1959 Lavant Cup =

Race details
- Date: 30 March 1959
- Official name: X Lavant Cup
- Location: Goodwood Circuit, West Sussex
- Course: Permanent racing facility
- Course length: 3.863 km (2.408 miles)
- Distance: 15 laps, 57.93 km (36.12 miles)
- Weather: Wet
- Attendance: 40,000

Pole position
Driver	(Australia) Jack Brabham	Cooper

Fastest lap
Driver	(United Kingdom) Roy Salvadori	Cooper
- Time: 1:30.2

Podium
First	(Australia) Jack Brabham	Cooper
Second	(United Kingdom) Roy Salvadori	Cooper
Third	(United Kingdom) Jim Russell	Cooper

The 10th Lavant Cup was a motor race, run to Formula Two rules, held on 30 March 1959 at Goodwood Circuit, West Sussex. The race was run over 15 laps, and was won from pole position by Australian driver Jack Brabham in a Cooper T45-Climax. Roy Salvadori was second in a Cooper T43-Climax and set fastest lap, and Jim Russell was third in a Cooper T45-Climax.

== Results ==
Pos.	No.	Driver	Entrant	Car	Time/Retired	Grid
1	21	(Australia) Jack Brabham	Cooper Car Company	Cooper T45-Climax	23:08.4	1
2	20	(United Kingdom) Roy Salvadori	High Efficiency Motors	Cooper T45-Climax	+0.4s	2
3	26	(United Kingdom) Jim Russell	J. Russell	Cooper T45-Climax	+12.8s	3
4	37	(United Kingdom) Graham Hill	Team Lotus	Lotus 12-Climax	15 laps	7
5	23	(United States) Masten Gregory	Alan Brown Equipe	Cooper T45-Climax	15 laps	4
6	24	(New Zealand) Bruce McLaren	Alan Brown Equipe	Cooper T45-Climax	15 laps	5
7	27	(United Kingdom) Tony Marsh	T. Marsh	Cooper T45-Climax	15 laps	6
8	25	(United Kingdom) Keith Greene	Gilby Engineering	Cooper T43-Climax	+1 lap	8
9	38	(United Kingdom) Bruce Halford	John Fisher Equipe	Lotus 16-Climax	+1 laps	10
10	19	(United Kingdom) Ivor Bueb	British Racing Partnership	Cooper T51-Borgward	+1 lap	9
11	31	(United Kingdom) Jackie Lewis	H&L Motors	Cooper T45-Climax	+1 lap	11
12	18	(United Kingdom) George Wicken	British Racing Partnership	Cooper T51-Borgward	+2 laps	12
13	39	(United Kingdom) Dennis Taylor	D. Taylor	Lotus 12-Climax	+2 laps	14
	22	(France) Jean Lucienbonnet	Cooper Car Company	Cooper T45-Climax		21
	28	(United Kingdom) Tim Parnell	R.H.H. Parnell	Cooper T45-Climax		15
	29	(United Kingdom) Bill Moss	United Racing Stable	Cooper T51-Climax		18
	30	(United Kingdom) John Campbell-Jones	J. Campbell-Jones	Cooper T43-Climax		20
	32	(United Kingdom) Dickie Stoop	R. Stoop	Cooper T43-Climax		13
	33	(United Kingdom) Norman Barclay	N. Barclay	Cooper T43-Climax		17
	34	(United Kingdom) Jimmy Stuart	J.T. Stuart	Cooper T43-Climax		16
	36	(United Kingdom) Trevor Taylor	Ace Garage Rotherham	Cooper T51-Climax		19
DNS	35	(United Kingdom) Chris Bristow	Bradstock Motors Ltd.	Cooper T43-Climax		-
DNA	17	(United Kingdom) Stirling Moss	R.R.C. Walker Racing Team	Cooper T43-Borgward		-
DNA	24	(United Kingdom) Mike Taylor	Alan Brown Equipe	Cooper T45-Climax	car driven by Bruce McLaren	-
DNA	29	(United Kingdom) Cliff Allison	United Racing Stable	Cooper T51-Climax	car driven by Bill Moss	-
