= 1958 Lavant Cup =

Race details
- Date: 7 April 1958
- Official name: IX Lavant Cup
- Location: Goodwood Circuit, West Sussex
- Course: Permanent racing facility
- Course length: 3.863 km (2.408 miles)
- Distance: 15 laps, 57.93 km (36.12 miles)
- Weather: Cold
- Attendance: 60,000

Pole position
Driver	(United Kingdom) Roy Salvadori	Cooper
- Time: 1:38.2

Fastest lap
Driver	(United Kingdom) Graham Hill	Lotus
- Time: 1:30.2

Podium
First	(Australia) Jack Brabham	Cooper
Second	(United Kingdom) Graham Hill	Lotus
Third	(United Kingdom) Cliff Allison	Lotus

The 9th Lavant Cup was a motor race, run to Formula Two rules, held on 7 April 1958 at Goodwood Circuit, West Sussex. The race was run over 15 laps, and was won by Australian driver Jack Brabham in a Cooper T43-Climax. Graham Hill was second in a Lotus 12-Climax and set fastest lap, and Cliff Allison was third in another Lotus 12. Roy Salvadori started from pole position in a Cooper T43-Climax but crashed out on lap two.

== Results ==
Pos.	No.	Driver	Entrant	Car	Time/Retired	Grid
1	20	(Australia) Jack Brabham	Cooper Car Company	Cooper T43-Climax	23:02.2	3
2	21	(United Kingdom) Graham Hill	Team Lotus	Lotus 12-Climax	+0.4s	2
3	22	(United Kingdom) Cliff Allison	Team Lotus	Lotus 12-Climax	+21.2s	5
4	9	(United Kingdom) Stuart Lewis-Evans	British Racing Partnership	Cooper T45-Climax	+21.2s	4
5	27	(United Kingdom) Tony Marsh	T. Marsh	Cooper T45-Climax	+1:08.4	7
6	42	(United Kingdom) John Lewis	J. Lewis	Cooper T43-Climax	+1 lap	8
7	31	(United Kingdom) George Wicken	G. Wicken	Cooper T43-Climax	+1 lap	6
8	40	(United Kingdom) Jimmy Stuart	J.T. Stuart	Cooper T45-Climax	+1 lap	11
9	36	(United Kingdom) Dickie Stoop	R. Stoop	Cooper T43-Climax	+2 laps	10
Ret	28	(United Kingdom) Dennis Taylor	D. Taylor	Lotus 12-Climax	10 laps	12
Ret	29	(United Kingdom) Brian Naylor	B. Naylor	Cooper T45-Climax	4 laps	9
Ret	39	(United Kingdom) Roy Salvadori	C.T. Atkins	Cooper T43-Climax	2 laps, accident	1
