= 1956 Lavant Cup =

Race details
- Date: 2 April 1956
- Official name: VIII Lavant Cup
- Location: Goodwood Circuit, West Sussex
- Course: Permanent racing facility
- Course length: 3.809 km (2.367 miles)
- Distance: 7 laps, 26.577 km (16.569 miles)
- Weather: Sunny
- Attendance: 60,000

Fastest lap
Drivers	(United Kingdom) Bob Gerard	Cooper
	(United Kingdom) Roy Salvadori	Cooper
- Time: 1:35.9

Podium
First	(United Kingdom) Roy Salvadori	Cooper
Second	(United Kingdom) Bob Gerard	Cooper
Third	(United Kingdom) John Young	Connaught

The 8th Lavant Cup was a motor race held on 2 April 1956 at Goodwood Circuit, West Sussex. The race was run over 7 laps, and was won by British driver Roy Salvadori in a Cooper-Climax, setting joint fastest lap in the process. Bob Gerard in a Cooper-Bristol was second and shared fastest lap with Salvadori. John Young was third in a Connaught-Lea Francis.

The race was marred by the death of Bert Rogers, killed when his Tojeiro-Bristol crashed at Lavant Corner.

== Results ==
Pos.	Driver	Car	Time/Retired
1	Roy Salvadori	Cooper-Climax	11:24.3, 87.17 mph
2	Bob Gerard	Cooper-Bristol	+1.0s
3	John Young	Connaught-Lea Francis	
4	Cliff Davis	Lotus-Bristol	
	Les Leston	Willment-Climax	
Ret	Ken Tyrrell	Cooper-Alta	6 laps
Ret	Bert Rogers	Tojeiro-Bristol	1 lap, fatal accident
