= 1951 Goodwood Trophy =

- Non-championship race in the 1951 Formula One season

Race details
- Date: 29 September 1951
- Official name: IV Goodwood Trophy
- Location: Chichester, West Sussex, UK
- Course: Goodwood Circuit
- Course length: 3.830 km (2.388 miles)
- Distance: 15 laps, 57.450 km (35.817 miles)

Pole position
Driver	(United Kingdom) Tony Rolt	Delage-ERA
- Grid positions set by ballot

Fastest lap
Driver	(Italy) Giuseppe Farina	Alfa Romeo
- Time: 1:28.0

Podium
First	(Italy) Giuseppe Farina	Alfa Romeo
Second	(United Kingdom) Reg Parnell	Ferrari
Third	(United Kingdom) Tony Rolt	Delage-ERA

The 1951 Goodwood Trophy was a non-championship Formula One motor race held at the Goodwood Circuit on 29 September 1951. The race was won by Giuseppe Farina in an Alfa Romeo 159, setting fastest lap in the process. Reg Parnell in a Ferrari 375 was second and Tony Rolt third in a Delage 15S8-ERA.

== Results ==
Pos	No	Driver	Entrant	Car	Time/Retired
1	2	(Italy) Giuseppe Farina	Alfa Corse	Alfa Romeo 159	22:31.2, 95.39mph
2	3	(United Kingdom) Reg Parnell	G.A. Vandervell	Ferrari 375	+5.6s
3	18	(United Kingdom) Tony Rolt	Rob Walker Racing	Delage 15S8-ERA	+12.8s
4	10	(United Kingdom) Bob Gerard	F.R. Gerard	ERA B-Type	+13.8s
5	6	(United Kingdom) Stirling Moss	Hersham and Walton Motors	HWM-Alta	+1 lap
6	12	(United Kingdom) Ken Wharton	Ken Wharton	ERA B-Type	+1 lap
7	7	(United Kingdom) George Abecassis	Hersham and Walton Motors	HWM-Alta	+1 lap
8	14	(United Kingdom) John James	John James	Maserati 4CLT/48	+2 laps
9	19	(United Kingdom) Bill Whitehouse	Tony Gaze	Alta F2	+2 laps
Ret	8	(United Kingdom) Graham Whitehead	Graham Whitehead	ERA B-Type	8 laps
Ret	16	(United Kingdom) Bobby Baird	Bobby Baird	Maserati 4CLT/48	6 laps
Ret	11	(United Kingdom) David Hampshire	David Hampshire	ERA A-Type	5 laps
Ret	27	(United Kingdom) Tony Stokes	Tony Stokes	Alta F2	3 laps
Ret	17	(United Kingdom) Duncan Hamilton	Duncan Hamilton	Talbot-Lago T26C	2 laps
Ret	57	(Switzerland) Antonio Branca	Vicomtesse de Walckiers	Maserati 4CLT/48	1 lap, crash
Ret	9	(United Kingdom) Brian Shawe-Taylor	Brian Shawe-Taylor	ERA B-Type	1 lap, crash

Previous race: 1951 Bari Grand Prix	Formula One non-championship races 1951 season	Next race: 1952 Syracuse Grand Prix
Previous race: 1950 Goodwood Trophy	Goodwood Trophy	Next race: 1952 Goodwood Trophy
