= Mike Harris (racing driver) =

Northern Rhodesian racing driver (1939–2021)

- Born: 25 May 1939; Mufulira, Northern Rhodesia
- Died: 8 November 2021 (aged 82); Durban, South Africa

Formula One World Championship career
- Nationality: Federation of Rhodesia and Nyasaland
- Active years: 1962
- Team: privateer Cooper
- Entries: 1
- Championships: 0
- Wins: 0
- Podiums: 0
- Career points: 0
- Pole positions: 0
- Fastest laps: 0
- First entry: 1962 South African Grand Prix

Mike Harris (25 May 1939 – 8 November 2021) was a Northern Rhodesian racing driver who later moved to South Africa. He took part in one World Championship Formula One Grand Prix, the 1962 South African Grand Prix, from which he retired.

== Career ==
Harris was born in Mufulira, Northern Rhodesia. There is some confusion surrounding his racing years with respect to which country he represented as a Grand Prix driver, it being variably given as either Rhodesia or South Africa, although he was a resident of Salisbury in the early 1960s when he competed in auto racing.

Harris won the 1962 Rhodesian Championship with his Cooper T53, powered by an Alfa Romeo engine. On 2 December of that year he qualified third for the 1962 Rhodesian Grand Prix, and finished the race in the same position behind Gary Hocking and Neville Lederle. He then travelled to South Africa and took part in the 1962 Rand Grand Prix, qualifying 20th from an entry of 34 cars, but retiring from the race with a puncture. The following week he qualified 17th fastest for the 1962 Natal Grand Prix, but retired from his heat and so missed the final. After Christmas Harris was part of a stronger international field for the South African Grand Prix which would decide the 1962 World Championship. In the first practice session on Boxing Day he suffered an engine failure and he missed the following day's practice while he made repairs. During the final practice session on the third day, he suffered with the same issues again and posted the 15th fastest time, with only Carel Godin de Beaufort having a slower time. Having rebuilt the engine again before the race, Harris circulated towards the back of the field, running ahead of de Beaufort and Bruce Johnstone, and subsequently other drivers whose cars suffered problems. However, on lap 32 of the 82 lap race, Harris retired from tenth position with the same engine bearing failure that had plagued him in practice.

Harris subsequently decreased his involvement in the sport and retired, at least partly due to the death of Gary Hocking at the Natal Grand Prix. He later ran Alfa Romeo and Toyota dealerships in Northern Rhodesia (Zambia from 1964) and Zimbabwe, before retiring to live in Durban, South Africa with his wife Patricia Harris.

Harris died in Durban on 8 November 2021, aged 82.

== Complete Formula One results ==
(key)

Year	Entrant	Chassis	Engine	1	2	3	4	5	6	7	8	9	WDC	Points
1962	Mike Harris	Cooper T53	Alfa Romeo Straight-4	NED	MON	BEL	FRA	GBR	GER	ITA	USA	RSA; Ret	NC	0

=== Non-championship results ===
(key)

Year	Entrant	Chassis	Engine	1	2	3	4	5	6	7	8	9	10	11	12	13	14	15	16	17	18	19	20
1962	Mike Harris	Cooper T53	Alfa Romeo Straight-4	CAP	BRX	LOM	LAV	GLV	PAU	AIN	INT	NAP	MAL	CLP	RMS	SOL	KAN	MED	DAN	OUL	MEX	RAN; Ret	NAT; Ret
