= 1952 Goodwood Trophy =

- Formula Libre race

Race details
- Date: 27 September 1952
- Official name: 'Daily Graphic' Goodwood Trophy
- Location: Chichester, West Sussex
- Course: Goodwood Circuit
- Course length: 3.830 km (2.388 miles)
- Distance: 15 laps, 57.450 km (35.817 miles)

Fastest lap
Driver	(United Kingdom) Reg Parnell	BRM
- Time: 1:35.1

Podium
First	(Argentina) José Froilán González	BRM
Second	(United Kingdom) Reg Parnell	BRM
Third	(United Kingdom) Ken Wharton	BRM

The 1952 'Daily Graphic' Goodwood Trophy was a Formula Libre motor race held at the Goodwood Circuit, West Sussex, on 27 September 1952. The race was won by Argentinian driver José Froilán González in a BRM Type 15, setting fastest lap in the process. Gonzalez's teammates Reg Parnell and Ken Wharton were second and third, also in Type 15s.

== Results ==
Pos	No	Driver	Entrant	Car	Time/Retired
1	5	(Argentina) José Froilán González	British Racing Motors	BRM Type 15	24:30.6, 88.13mph
2	6	(United Kingdom) Reg Parnell	British Racing Motors	BRM Type 15	+7.6s
3	7	(United Kingdom) Ken Wharton	British Racing Motors	BRM Type 15	+10.6s
4		(United Kingdom) Dennis Poore	Connaught Engineering	Connaught Type A-Lea Francis	+47.4s
5	17	(United Kingdom) Stirling Moss	ERA Ltd.	ERA G-Type	+56.6s
6	26	(United Kingdom) Roy Salvadori	W.R. Baird	Ferrari 500	+1:05.4
7	12	(Australia) Tony Gaze	L.W. Boyce	Maserati 8CM	+1:15.6
8	9	(United Kingdom) Graham Whitehead	A.G. Whitehead	ERA C-Type	+1:17.4
9	21	(United Kingdom) Kenneth McAlpine	Connaught Engineering	Connaught Type A-Lea Francis	+1:36.2
10	24	(United Kingdom) Kenneth Downing	Connaught Engineering	Connaught Type A-Lea Francis	
11		(United Kingdom) Peter Whitehead	P. Whitehead	Alta F2	
12		(France) André Loens	G.H. Hartwell	Cooper T20-Bristol	
Ret	18	(United Kingdom) Tony Rolt	R.R.C. Walker	Delage 15S8	9 laps
Ret	16	(United Kingdom) Alan Brown	Ecurie Richmond	Cooper T20-Bristol	8 laps
Ret		(France) Louis Rosier	Ecurie Rosier	Ferrari 375	4 laps
Ret	8	(United Kingdom) Bob Gerard	F.R. Gerard	ERA A-Type	4 laps
