= 1960 Lavant Cup =

Race details
- Date: 18 April 1960
- Official name: XI Lavant Cup
- Location: Goodwood Circuit, West Sussex
- Course: Permanent racing facility
- Course length: 3.862 km (2.4 miles)
- Distance: 15 laps, 57.93 km (36.0 miles)

Pole position
Driver	(United Kingdom) Innes Ireland	Lotus-Climax
- Time: 1:29.4

Fastest lap
Driver	(United Kingdom) Innes Ireland	Lotus-Climax
- Time: 1:28.8

Podium
First	(United Kingdom) Innes Ireland	Lotus-Climax
Second	(United Kingdom) Stirling Moss	Porsche
Third	(United Kingdom) Roy Salvadori	Cooper-Climax

The 11th Lavant Cup was a motor race, run for Formula Two cars, held on 18 April 1960 at Goodwood Circuit, West Sussex. The race was run over 15 laps of the circuit, and was won by British driver Innes Ireland in a Lotus 18. Ireland had also qualified in pole position, and set fastest lap during the race. Stirling Moss in a Porsche 718/2 was second and Roy Salvadori in a Cooper T51 was third.

== Results ==
Pos	No.	Driver	Entrant	Constructor	Time/Retired	Grid
1	25	(United Kingdom) Innes Ireland	Team Lotus	Lotus 18-Climax	22:24.2	1
2	21	(United Kingdom) Stirling Moss	R.R.C. Walker Racing Team	Porsche 718/2	+6.4s	2
3	27	(United Kingdom) Roy Salvadori	High Efficiency Motors	Cooper T51-Climax	+23.2s	3
4	23	(United Kingdom) Chris Bristow	Yeoman Credit Racing Team	Cooper T51-Climax	+32.2s	4
5	31	(United Kingdom) Bruce Halford	John Fisher	Cooper T45-Climax	+46.0s	5
6	33	(United Kingdom) Mike McKee	Jim Russell Racing School	Cooper T45-Climax	+49.4s	8
7	28	(New Zealand) Denis Hulme	New Zealand International Grand Prix Team	Cooper T45-Climax	15 laps	12
8	22	(United States) Harry Schell	Yeoman Credit Racing Team	Cooper T51-Climax	15 laps	7
9	37	(United Kingdom) Ian Raby	Tom Payne	Hume-Cooper T39-Climax	15 laps	9
10	29	(New Zealand) George Lawton	New Zealand International Grand Prix Team	Cooper T45-Climax	15 laps	14
11	30	(United Kingdom) George Wicken	George Wicken	Cooper T43-Climax	15 laps	10
12	32	(United Kingdom) Maurice Charles	Maurice Charles Motors	Cooper T45-Climax		13
13	40	(United Kingdom) George Pfaff	Equipe Prideaux	Cooper T43-Climax		18
14	38	(United Kingdom) Mike Spence	Peter Westbury	Cooper T45-Climax		16
15	43	(United Kingdom) Dickie Stoop	Richard Stoop	Cooper T45-Climax		15
16	36	(United Kingdom) Albert Gray	Albert Gray	Lotus 12-Climax		17
Ret	41	(United Kingdom) Gerry Ashmore	Ashmore's Auto Engineering	Cooper T43-Climax		19
Ret	42	(United Kingdom) Henry Taylor	Laystall Engineering Ltd.	Laystall-Climax	Overheating	6
DNS	34	(Australia) Steve Ouvaroff	Count Steve Ouvaroff	Cooper T51-Climax		11
