= Brabham BT5 =

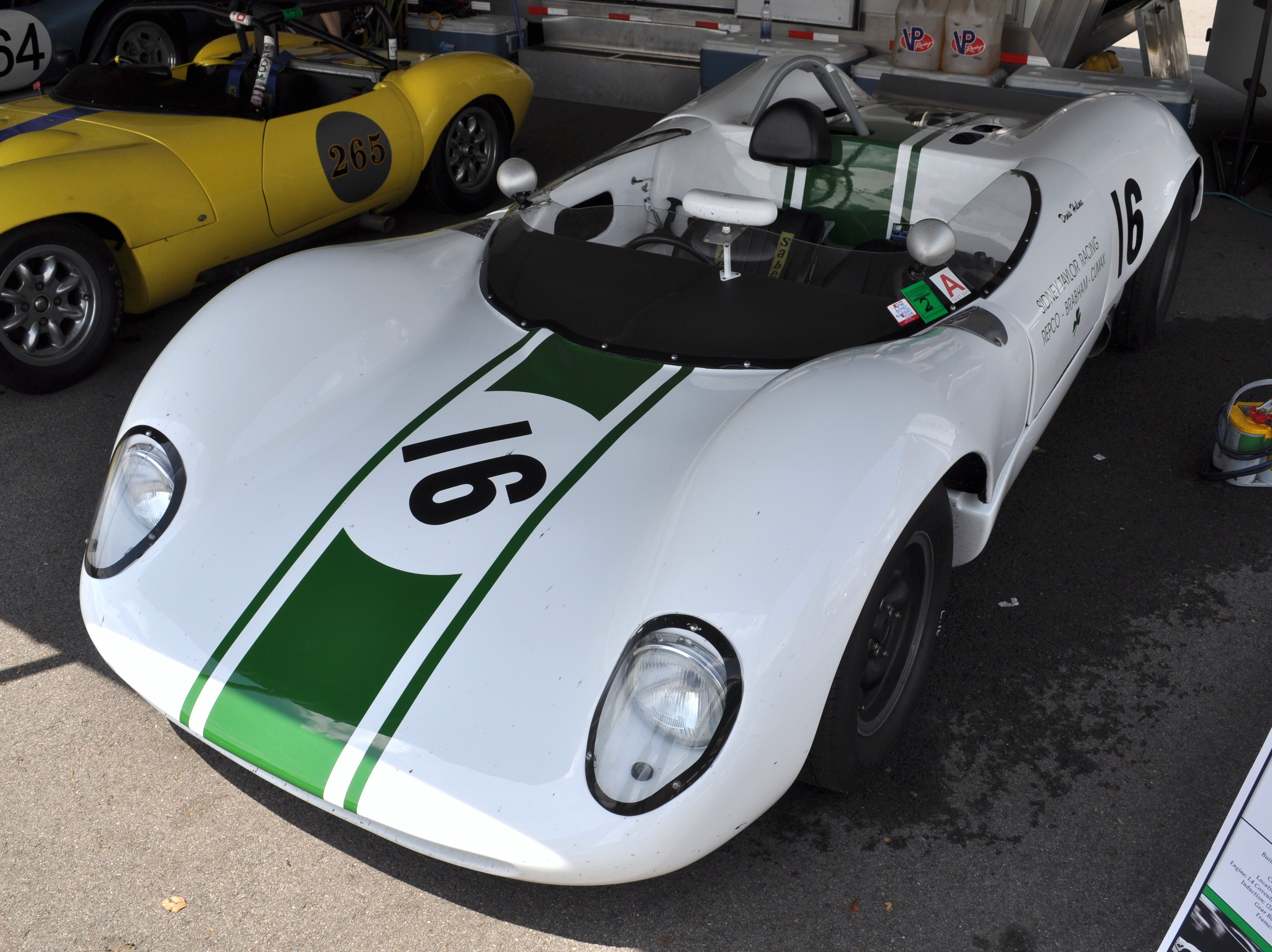
Brabham BT8

The Brabham BT5, and its evolution, the Brabham BT8, are sports racing cars manufactured and developed by Brabham in 1963 (BT5) and 1964 (BT8), respectively. It won a total of 4 races, and achieved 10 podium finishes.

== Development ==
After having worked to enter the competitions reserved for Formula One and Formula Junior, Brabham decided to dedicate itself also to the construction of racing cars with covered wheels. The result of this was the creation, in 1963, of the BT5, which was intended for private riders. Two examples were built.

== Design ==
The BT5 employed numerous components derived from open-wheeled cars. The chassis, covered with a fiberglass body, was multi-tubular in a spaceframe configuration, while the suspension was double wishbones in the front section, while in the rear it was double wishbones. The engine that equipped it was a Ford-Cosworth 116E Mk.XII 1.6 twin-shaft 140 hp (100 kW) engine mated to a four-speed Hewland manual gearbox. The braking system consisted of four disc brakes.

== Evolution ==
To allow it to accommodate larger engines, the BT5 underwent an enlargement in 1964 and was renamed BT8. A 245 hp Coventry Climax FPF engine was used. One example was equipped with a BRM P56 V8 engine.

== Racing history ==
The first vehicle was initially delivered to Ian Walker's team, who deployed it at Snetterton piloted by Frank Gardner and Paul Hawkin. Thanks to them the BT5 obtained the class victory, and this also happened at the Guards Trophy held at Brands Hatch. It was later sold to Peter Sachs who took it to several North American races. The second model was bought instead by the Canadian driver Ed Zeller, who achieved several successes in European competitions.

In 1964, with the introduction of the upgraded BT8 version, Brabham achieved notable results such as the conquest of the 1965 Tourist Trophy by Denny Hulme. Another important result was the conquest of the class victory and the third place overall at the Levant Cup on the Goodwood circuit by Jack Brabham on the BT8 of the US team Rosebud powered by BRM.
