= Cooper T53 =

Formula One race car designed and built by the Cooper Car Company

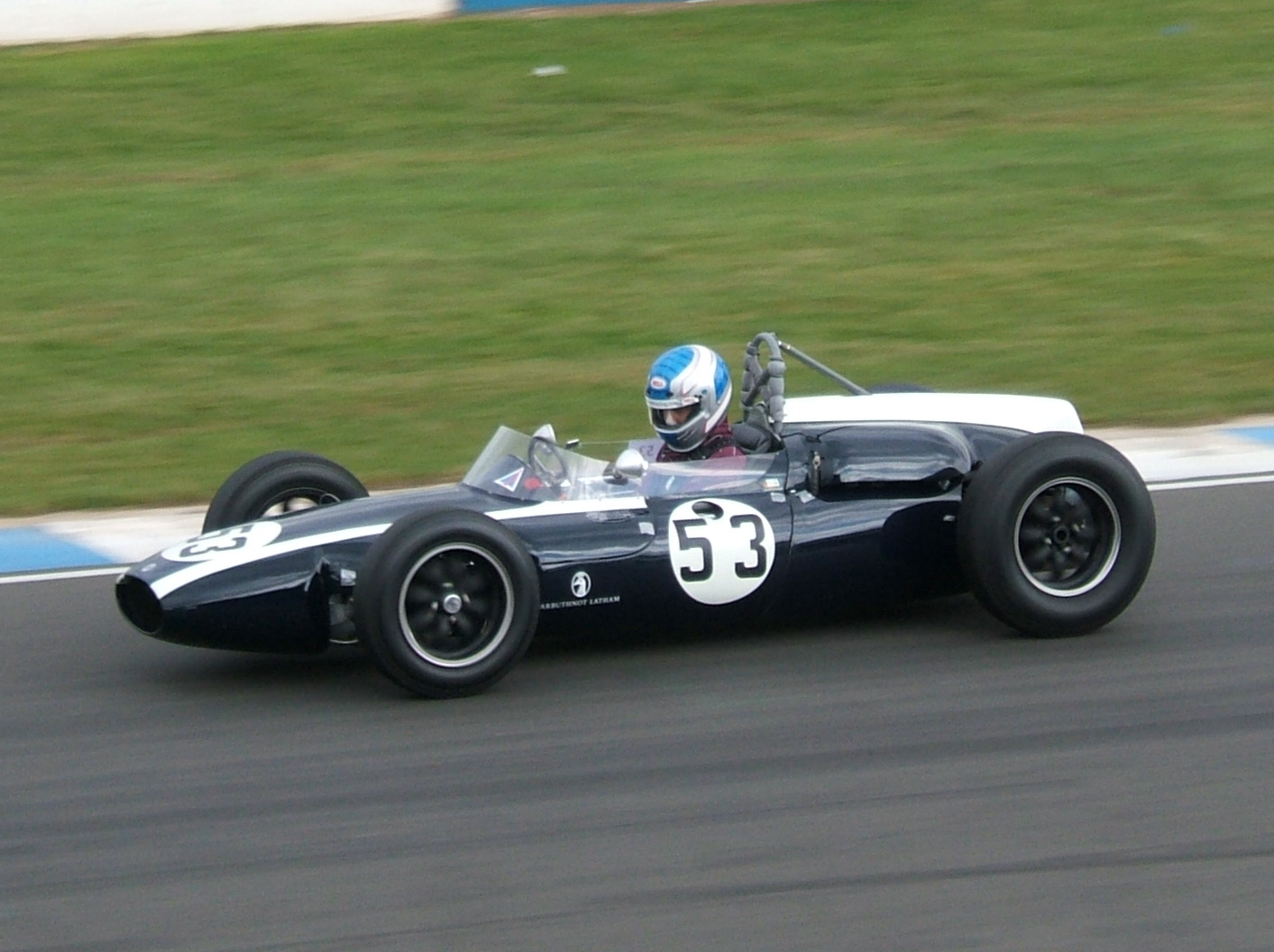
- Category: Formula One, Formula Two
- Constructor: Cooper Car Company
- Designer: Owen Maddock
- Predecessor: Cooper T51
- Successor: Cooper T55

Technical specifications
- Chassis: Steel spaceframe
- Suspension (front): Double wishbone, coil spring and damper
- Suspension (rear): Double wishbone, coil spring and damper
- Axle track: F: 1,190 mm (47 in); R: 1,220 mm (48 in)
- Wheelbase: 2,310 mm (91 in)
- Engine: Coventry Climax FPF 2.5-litre straight-4, naturally aspirated, rear mid, longitudinally mounted.
- Transmission: Cooper 5-speed manual gearbox.
- Weight: 500 kg (1,100 lb)
- Tyres: Dunlop

Competition history
- Notable entrants: Cooper
- Notable drivers: (Australia) Jack Brabham; (New Zealand) Bruce McLaren; (United Kingdom) John Surtees
Races	Wins	Poles	F/Laps
22	5	3	4
- Constructors' Championships: 1 (1960)
- Drivers' Championships: 1 (Jack Brabham, 1960)
- Unless otherwise stated, all data refer to Formula One World Championship Grands Prix only.

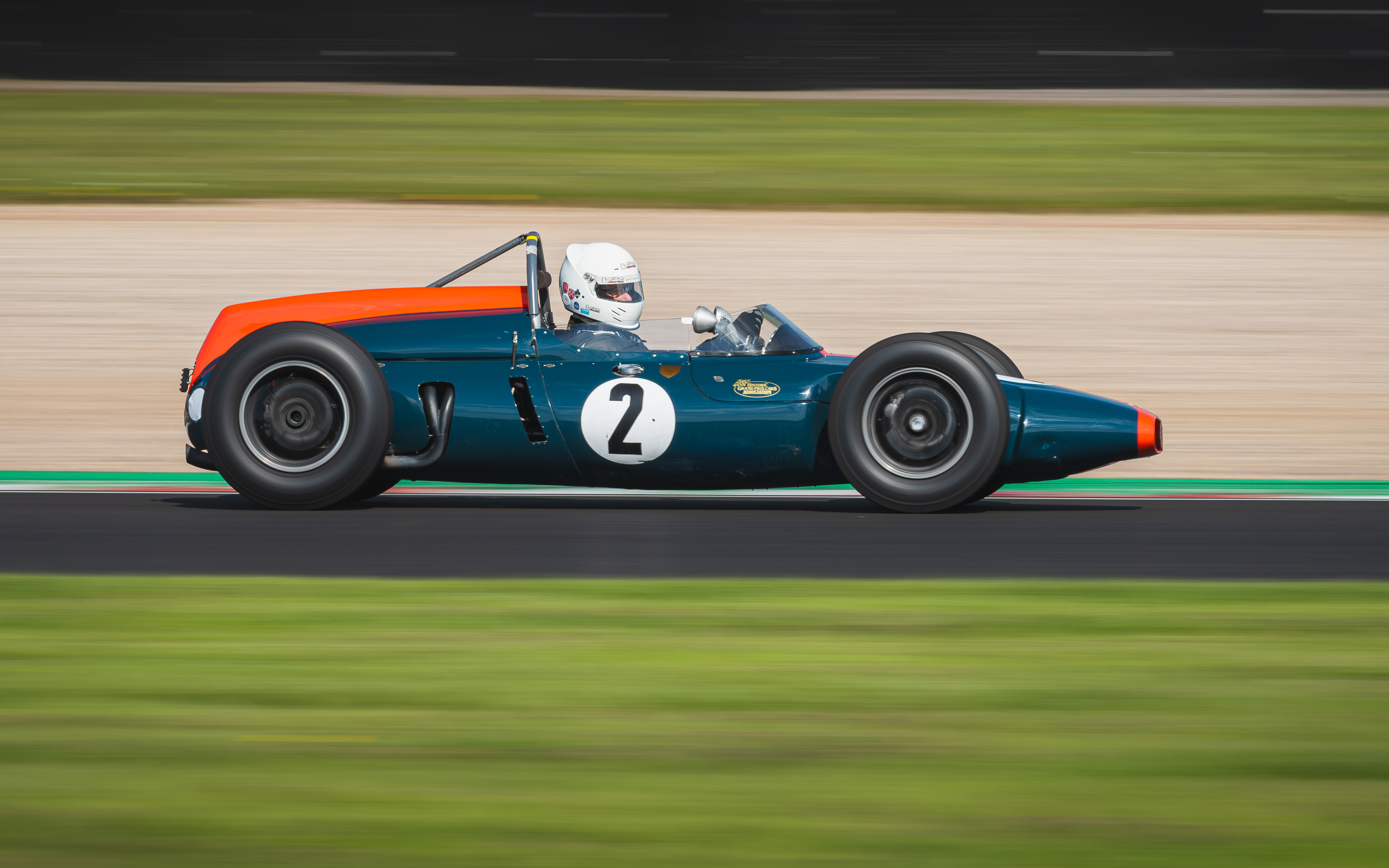
Cooper T53, Donington Park, 2023

The Cooper T53 is a Formula One car built by British motorsport team Cooper for the 1960 Formula One season. Jack Brabham drove it to his second World Championship that year, and with teammate Bruce McLaren gave Cooper its second Constructors' Championship.

A T53 was purchased by Honda as part of its own F1 development efforts and can be considered the forerunner of Honda F1 machines.

== Design and development history ==
The T53 was lower and slimmer than its predecessor, the Cooper T51. It was equipped with a new tubular steel frame clad in aluminium panels. Suspension was by double wishbones, coil springs and telescopic dampers all round, a change from Cooper's usual transverse leaf spring at the rear. Power came from the latest version of 2.5 litre Climax FPF which developed around 240 bhp and drove the rear wheels through a Cooper five-speed gearbox.

== Racing history ==
In its first race, Jack Brabham drove the new Cooper race car to second place in the International Trophy at Silverstone in May. At its first World Championship event at Monaco, Brabham qualified second but in the race itself he was disqualified after spinning off and then receiving a push start. Bruce McLaren put in a strong race, finishing second to Stirling Moss.

Thereafter, Brabham reeled off five wins in a row to tie up the World Championship with two events to spare. McLaren was runner-up, and Cooper won the Constructors' Championship. Brabham also won the non-championship Silver City Trophy.

In 1961 Cooper turned to the T55 but the T53 became a big sales success for the Cooper team, with no less than eight teams running it. Most teams ran the car with the 1.5 litre Climax FPF Mk. II to comply with the new F1 regulations, but Scuderia Centro Sud sourced a Maserati engine instead. Although they had some success in non-championship events, the privateers were largely outclassed in the 1961 World Championship.

The T53 was also used by various teams in the short-lived Intercontinental Formula in 1961. Stirling Moss and Jack Brabham won all five races in the series with the car, fitted with a 2.7 litre version of the FPF engine. Several examples also made their way to Australia and New Zealand and took part in the Tasman Series.

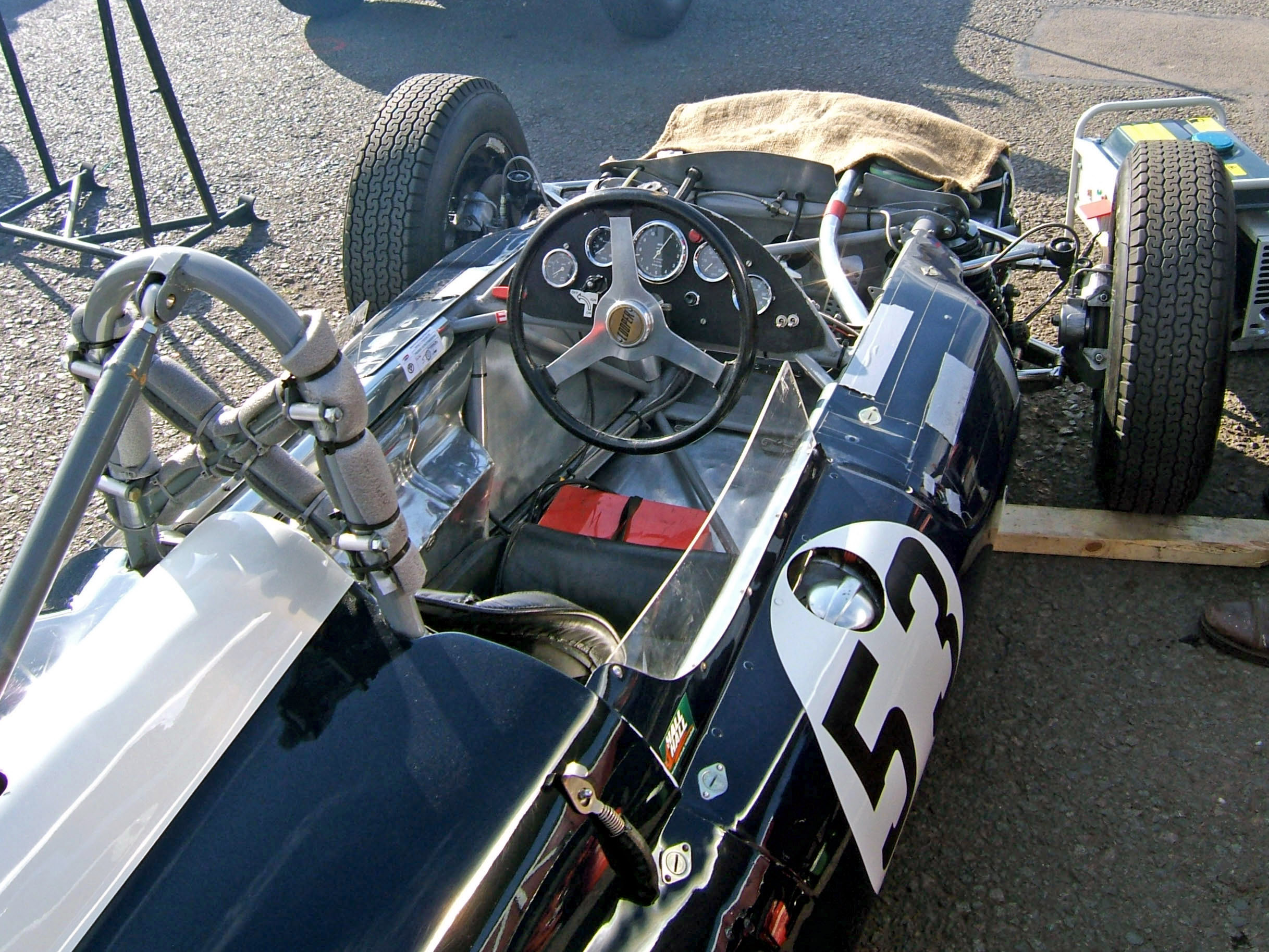
Cooper T53 cockpit

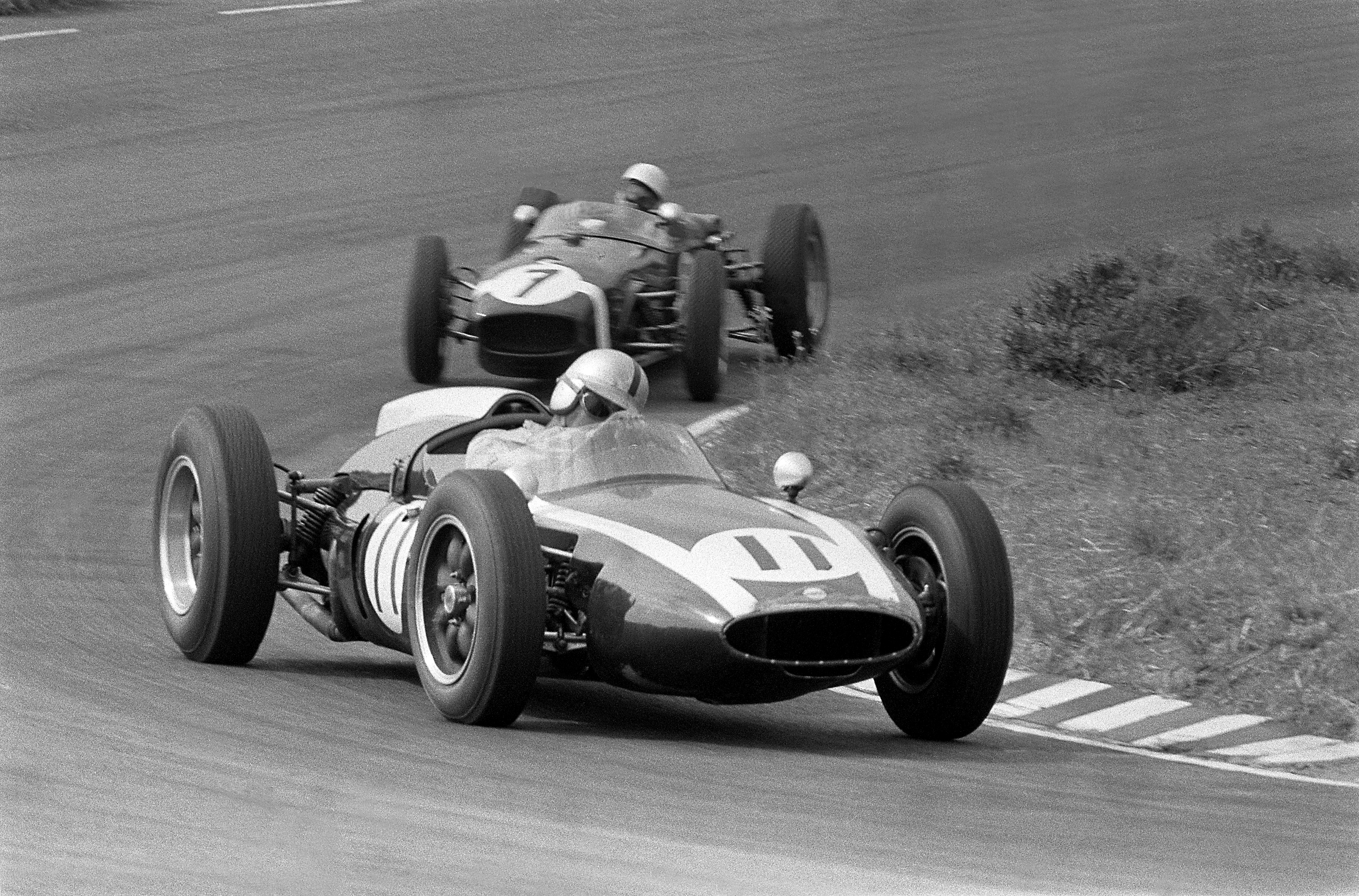
Jack Brabham in the Cooper T53 at the 1960 Dutch Grand Prix

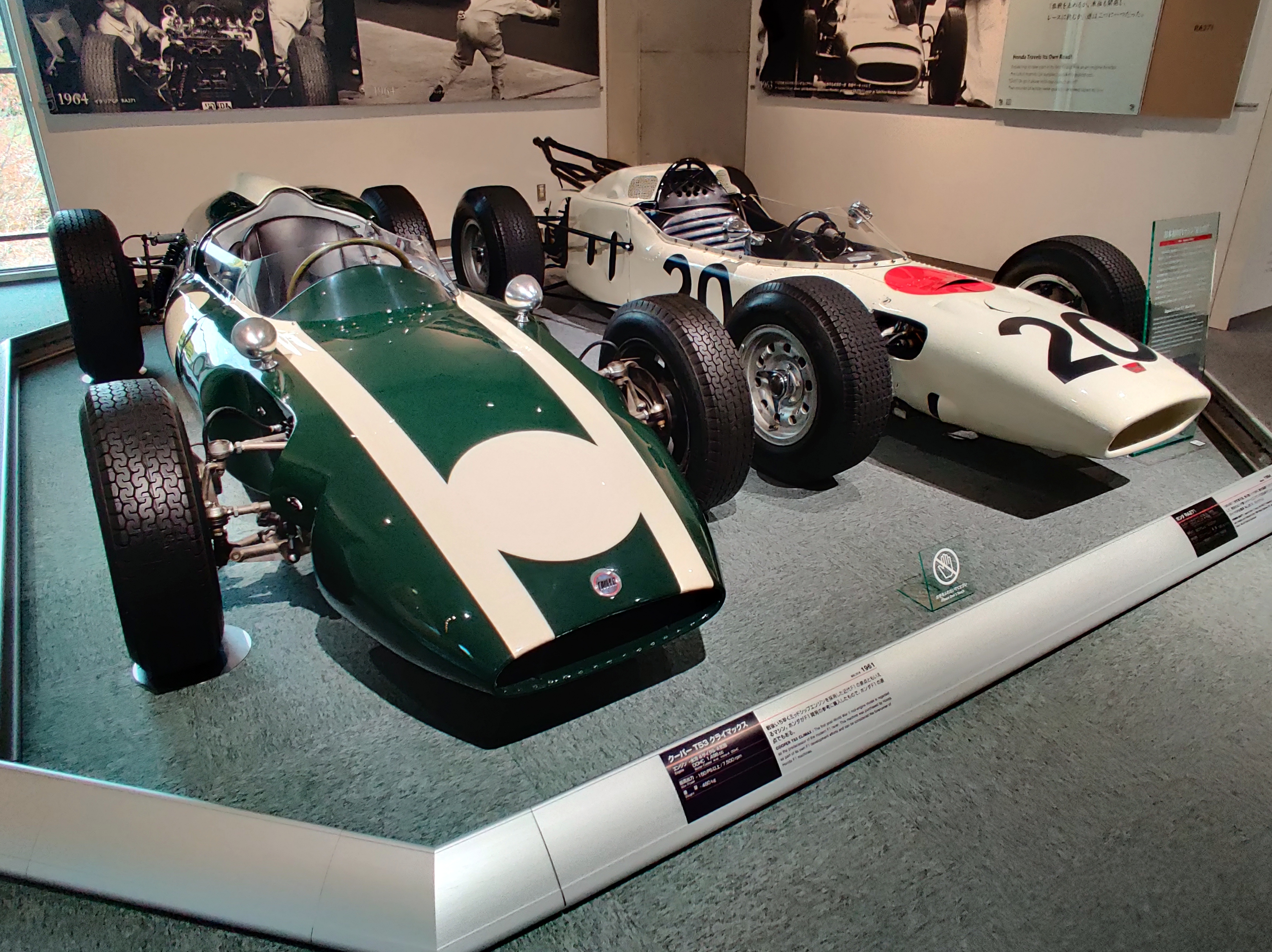
Cooper Climax T53 & Honda RA271 on display at Honda Collection Hall, Motegi

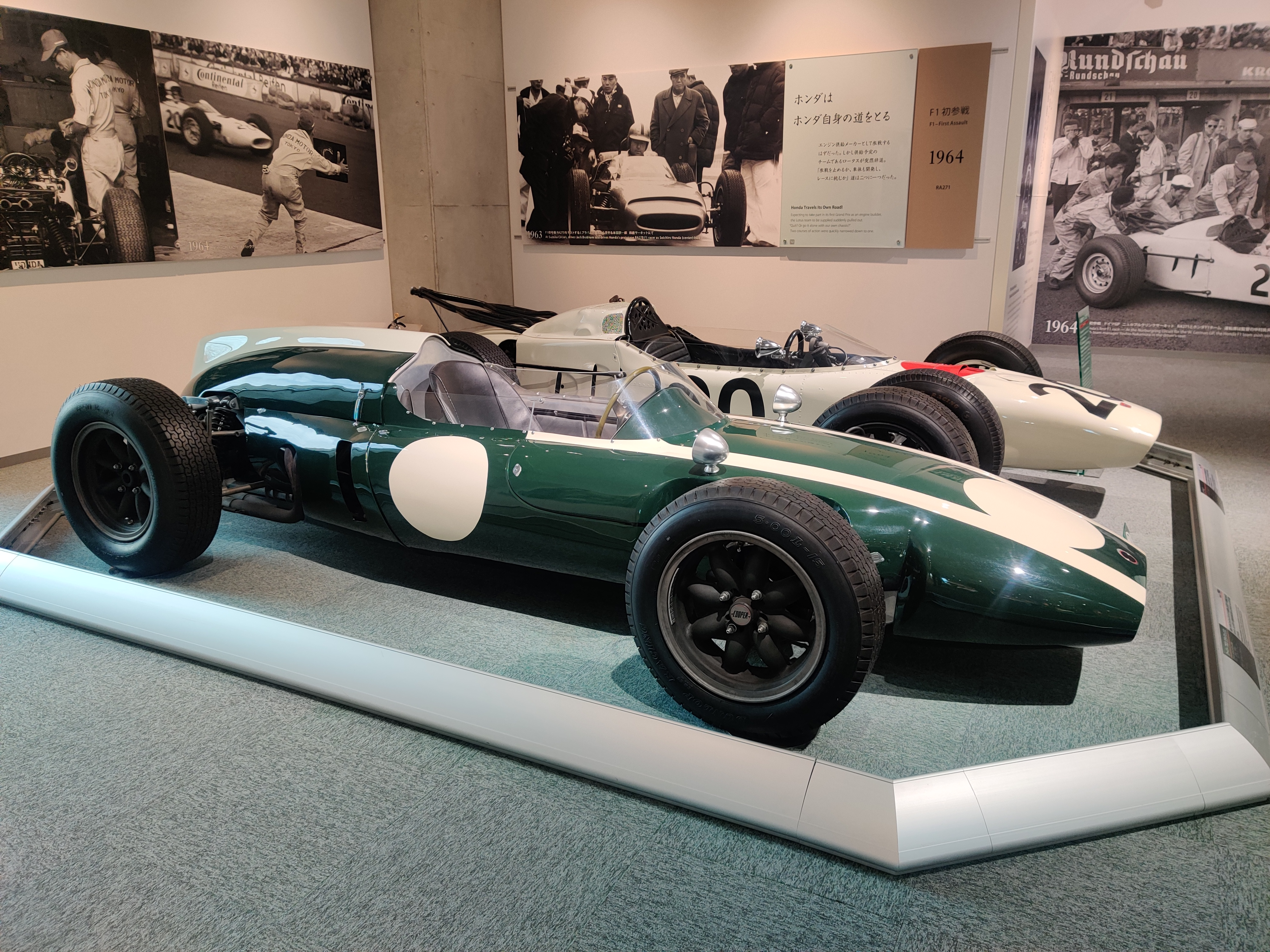
Cooper Climax T53 on display at Honda Collection Hall, Motegi

== Complete Formula One World Championship results ==
(key)

Year	Entrant	Engine	Tyres	Driver	1	2	3	4	5	6	7	8	9	10	Points	WCC
1960	Cooper Car Company	Climax FPF 2.5 L4	D		ARG	MON	500	NED	BEL	FRA	GBR	POR	ITA	USA	48 (58)*	1st
1960	Cooper Car Company	Climax FPF 2.5 L4	D	(Australia) Jack Brabham		DSQ		1	1^{P}^{F}	1^{P}^{F}	1^{P}	1		4^{F}	48 (58)*	1st
1960	Cooper Car Company	Climax FPF 2.5 L4	D	(New Zealand) Bruce McLaren		2^{F}		Ret	2	3	4	2		3	48 (58)*	1st
1961	Yeoman Credit Racing Team	Climax FPF 1.5 L4	D		MON	NED	BEL	FRA	GBR	GER	ITA	USA			14 (18)	4th
1961	Yeoman Credit Racing Team	Climax FPF 1.5 L4	D	(United Kingdom) John Surtees	11	7	5	Ret	Ret	5	Ret	Ret			14 (18)	4th
1961	Yeoman Credit Racing Team	Climax FPF 1.5 L4	D	(United Kingdom) Roy Salvadori				8	6	10	6	Ret			14 (18)	4th
1961	H&L Motors	Climax FPF 1.5 L4	D	(United Kingdom) Jackie Lewis			9	Ret	Ret	9	4				14 (18)	4th
1961	John M. Wyatt III	Climax FPF 1.5 L4	D	(United States) Roger Penske								8			14 (18)	4th
1961	Camoradi International	Climax FPF 1.5 L4	D	(United States) Masten Gregory	DNQ	DNS	10	12	11						14 (18)	4th
1961	Camoradi International	Climax FPF 1.5 L4	D	(United Kingdom) Ian Burgess						12					14 (18)	4th
1961	Hap Sharp	Climax FPF 1.5 L4	D	(United States) Hap Sharp								10			14 (18)	4th
1961	Bernard Collomb	Climax FPF 1.5 L4	D	(France) Bernard Collomb				Ret		NC					14 (18)	4th
1961	Momo Corporation	Climax FPF 1.5 L4	D	(United States) Walt Hansgen								Ret			14 (18)	4th
1961	Scuderia Centro Sud	Maserati 6-1500 1.5 L4	D	(Italy) Lorenzo Bandini			Ret		12	Ret	8				0	-
1962	Ecurie Galloise	Climax FPF 1.5 L4	D		NED	MON	BEL	FRA	GBR	GER	ITA	USA	RSA		29 (37)	3rd
1962	Ecurie Galloise	Climax FPF 1.5 L4	D	(United Kingdom) Jackie Lewis	8			Ret	10	Ret					29 (37)	3rd
1962	Hap Sharp	Climax FPF 1.5 L4	D	(United States) Hap Sharp								11			29 (37)	3rd
1962	Bernard Collomb	Climax FPF 1.5 L4	D	(France) Bernard Collomb						Ret					29 (37)	3rd
1962	Mike Harris	Alfa Romeo Giulietta 1.5 L4	D	(Federation of Rhodesia and Nyasaland) Mike Harris									Ret		0	-
1963	Scuderia Centro Sud	Maserati 6-1500 1.5 L4	D		MON	BEL	NED	FRA	GBR	GER	ITA	USA	MEX	RSA	0	-
1963	Scuderia Centro Sud	Maserati 6-1500 1.5 L4	D	(Italy) Ernesto Brambilla							DNQ				0	-

* Some points were scored using a Cooper T51
