= Lotus 30 =

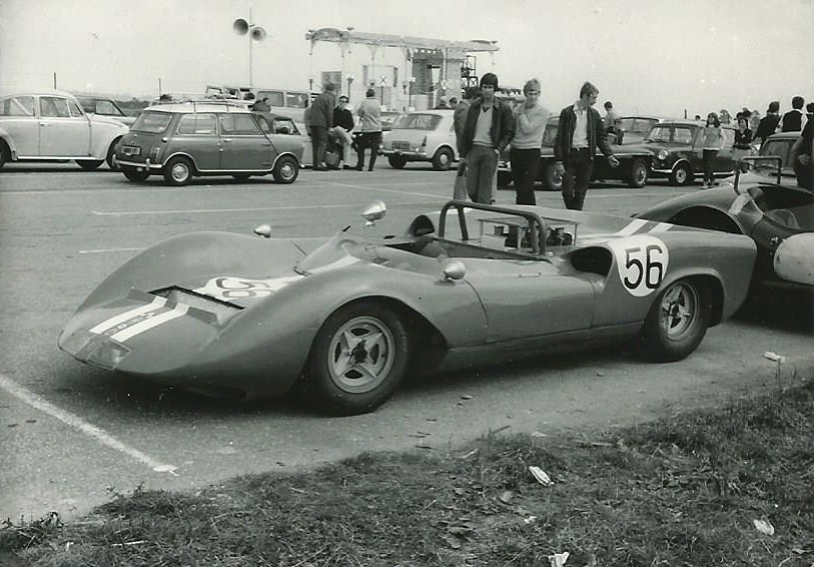
- Category: Group 4 Sports Car --see text
- Constructor: Team Lotus
- Designer(s): Colin Chapman and Martin Wade

Technical specifications
- Chassis: Steel Backbone
- Suspension (front): Double Wishbone, Outboard Coil Spring / Damper
- Suspension (rear): Double Wishbone, Outboard Coil Spring / Damper
- Engine: Ford 4,727cc 289 cu in V8
- Transmission: ZF 5DS20 5 Speed Manual Synchromesh Limited Slip Differential

Competition history
- Notable entrants: (United Kingdom) Team Lotus
- Notable drivers: (United Kingdom) Jim Clark

The Lotus 30 was a racing automobile, Colin Chapman's first attempt at a large displacement sports car racing machine following the success of the more conventional tube frame Lotus 19,19b and Lotus 23., it was designed by Colin Chapman and Martin Wade, and built in 1964. The Lotus 30 was raced in British races such as Guards Trophy, international races such as Nassau Speed Week that allowed FIA Group 4 "Sports Car" class of racing machines, and more importantly, in Can Am series. These were before the recognition and creation of Group 5, 6 and 7 categories by FIA in 1966. This explains why Lotus 30 and 40 (the latter was built in 1965) came originally equipped with headlights, tail lights and a windscreen wiper.

Notable for its curvilinear fibreglass body work and "pickle fork" backbone chassis first seen in the front engine Lotus Elan, on the 30 the layout was reversed and placed the engine behind the driver. Lotus engineer Len Terry was asked by Chapman to comment on the draft concept and considered it to be so flawed he refused to have anything to do with it. The Lotus 30 was powered by a 4.7 litre (289 c.i.) Ford V8 engine, the same type as used in the Ford GT40, mated to a 5 speed ZF synchromesh 5DS20 transaxle which was far more reliable than the Colotti transaxle used in the 19B against the torque of the V8. It used 13 inch wheels and solid disc brakes on each wheel. The Lotus 30 was regarded as unsuccessful and / or dangerous but when everything was working and nothing broke, the car was incredibly fast.

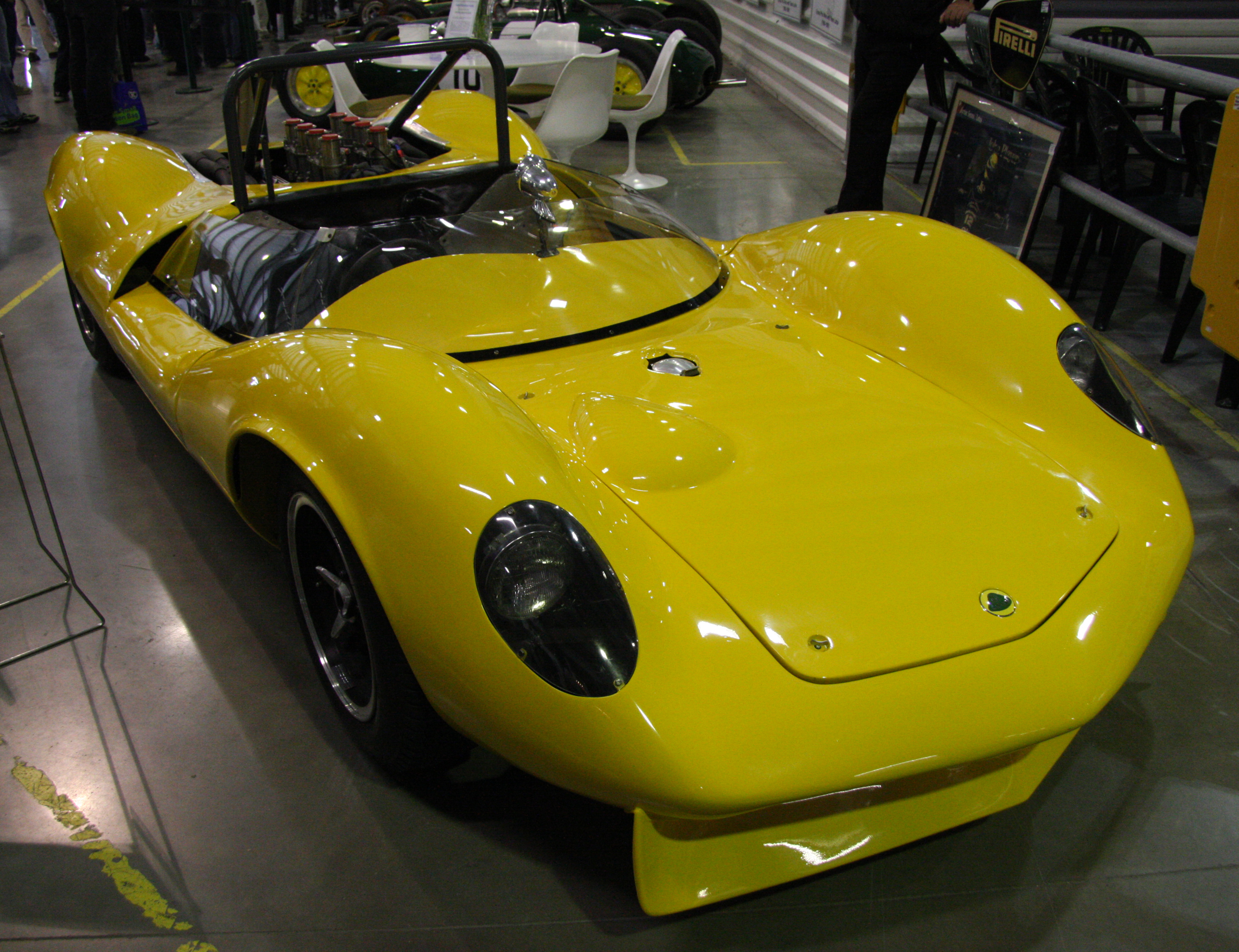
Lotus 30

The inherent flaws of the engineering became evident as horse power requirements and tire technology of the period evolved and pushed the original design past its intended limits. The problems were mainly related to the torsional rigidity of the backbone chassis and materials available at the time, all of which resulted in chassis and suspension failures.

Jim Clark laboured long with the car, and managed to prise some promising results with it before it was replaced with the Lotus 40. Equipped with 15in wheels and vented disc brakes as well as a larger engine, the 40 was just as recalcitrant as the 30. The most telling comment about these Lotus race cars was made by the American driver Richie Ginther. When asked what he thought of the new Lotus 40, Ginther, a lugubrious Californian, said, "Same as the 30 but with ten more mistakes".

The effort was not a total loss as this chassis type proved to be perfectly acceptable for the lower powered Lotus Europa, and was used on the Esprit series cars with further development.
