= Goodwood Circuit =

Motorsport track in the United Kingdom

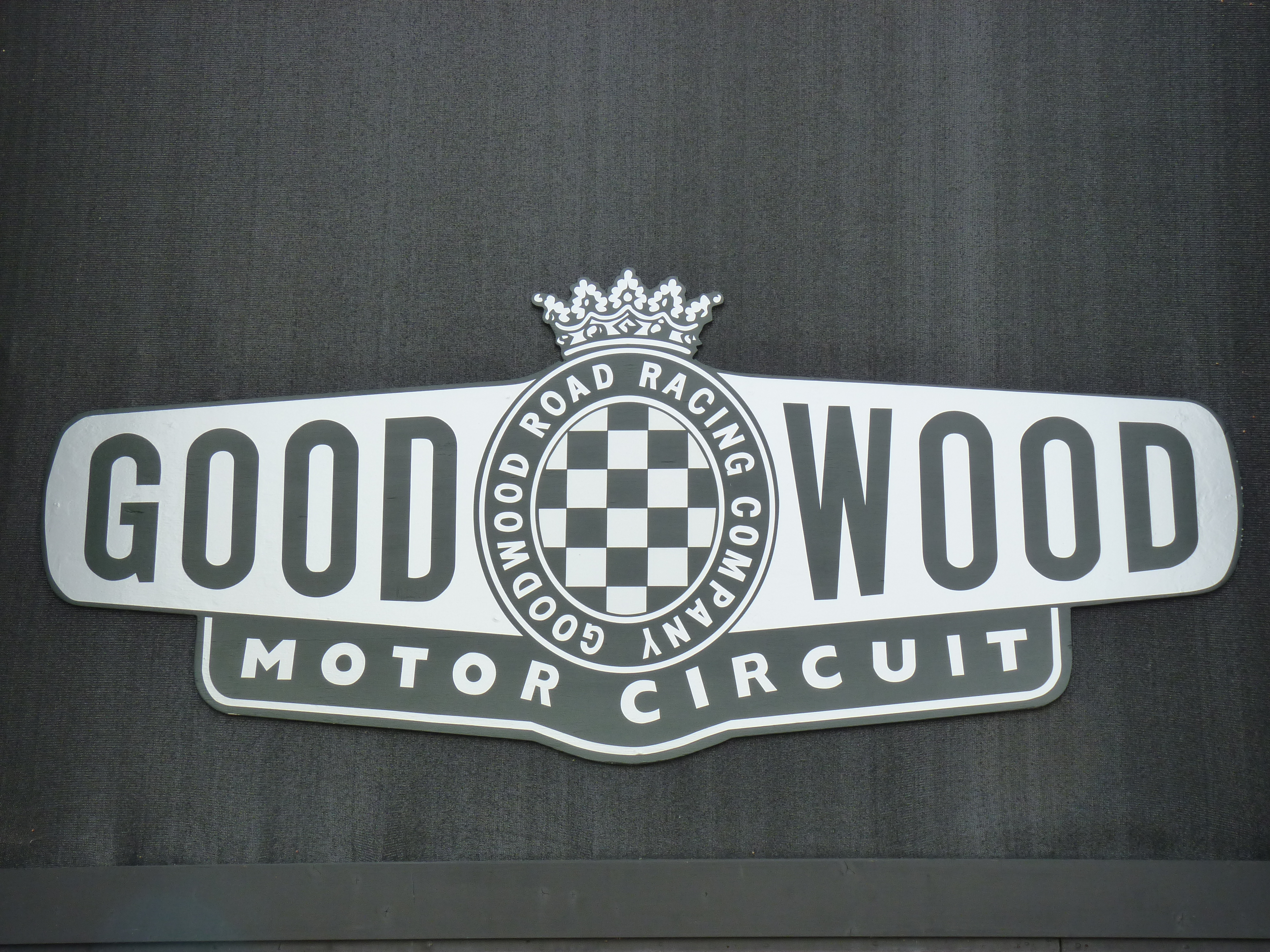

- Full Circuit (1952–present)
- Location: Goodwood, Chichester, West Sussex, United Kingdom
- Coordinates: 50°51′34″N 0°45′33″W
- FIA Grade: 4 (Restricted) (Note: Goodwood Circuit's Grade 4 Historic license expired 30 August 2025.)
- Broke ground: 1947
- Opened: 18 September 1948; 78 years ago
- Architect: Frederick Gordon-Lennox
- Major events: Current: Goodwood Festival of Speed (1993–2019, 2021–present); Goodwood Revival (1998–2019, 2021–present); Goodwood Members Meeting; Former: RAC TT (1958–1964)
- Website: http://www.goodwood.co.uk/circuithire/

Full Circuit (1952–present)
- Length: 3.862 km (2.400 mi)
- Turns: 9
- Race lap record: 1:18.217 ( (United Kingdom) Nick Padmore, Lola T70, 2015, Group 7)

Original Circuit (1948–1951)
- Length: 3.830 km (2.380 mi)
- Turns: 8
- Race lap record: 1:28.000 ( (Italy) Giuseppe Farina, Alfa Romeo 159, 1951, F1)

Goodwood Circuit is a historic venue for both two- and four-wheeled motorsports in the United Kingdom. The 2.367 mi (3.809 km) circuit is situated near Chichester, West Sussex, close to the south coast of England, on the estate of Goodwood House, and completely encircles Chichester/Goodwood Airfield. This is the racing circuit dating from 1948, not to be confused with the separate hillclimb course located at Goodwood House and first used in 1936.

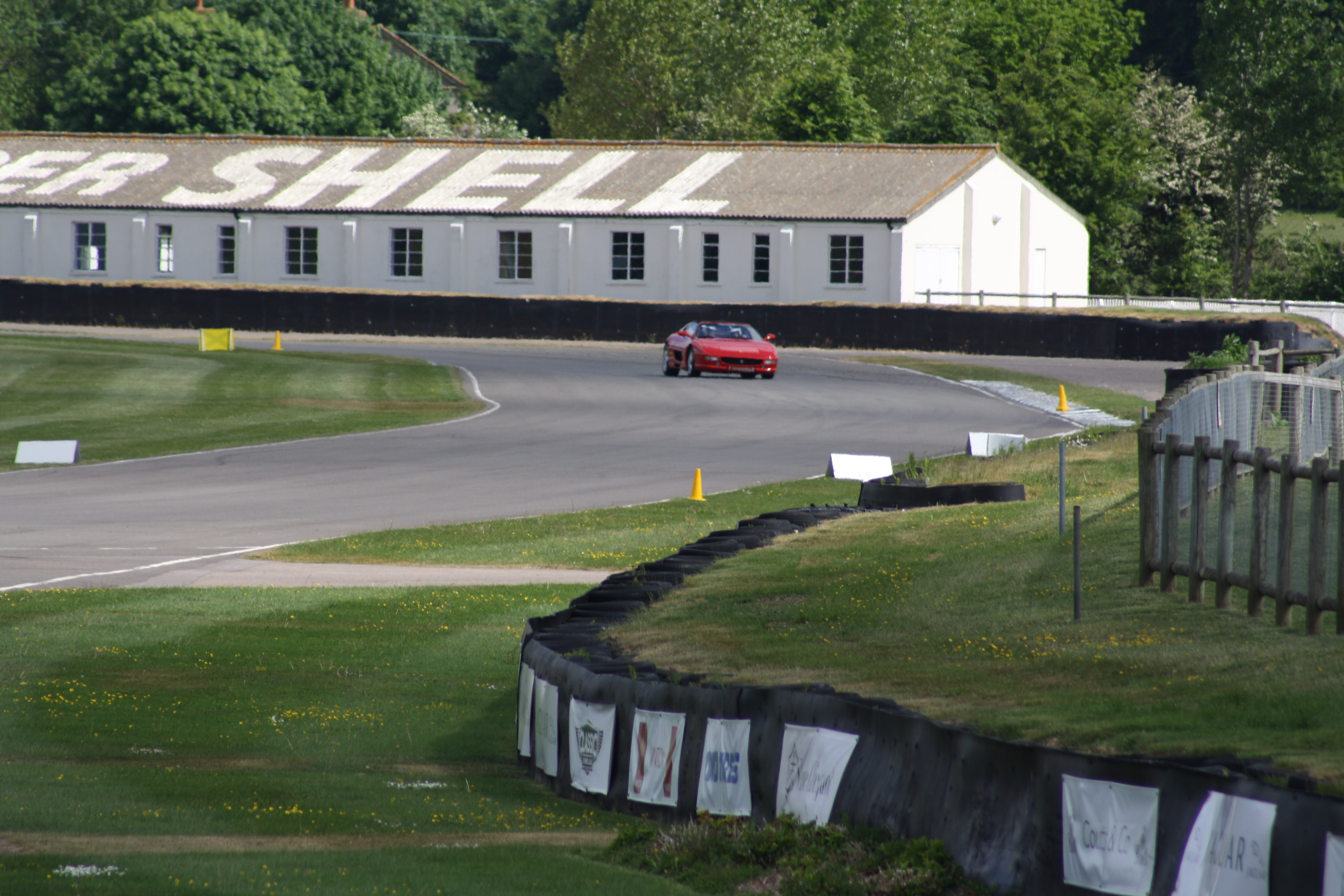
Approaching the chicane from Woodcote

== Early history (1948–1966) ==
The racing circuit began life as the perimeter track of RAF Westhampnett airfield, which was constructed during World War II as a relief airfield for RAF Tangmere. The first race meeting took place on 18 September 1948, organised by the Junior Car Club and sanctioned by the Duke of Richmond and Gordon. The winner of the first race was P. de F. C. Pycroft, in his 2,664 cc Pycroft-Jaguar, at 66.42 mph (106.89 km/h). Stirling Moss won the 500 cc race (later to become Formula 3), followed by Eric Brandon and "Curly" Dryden, all in Coopers.

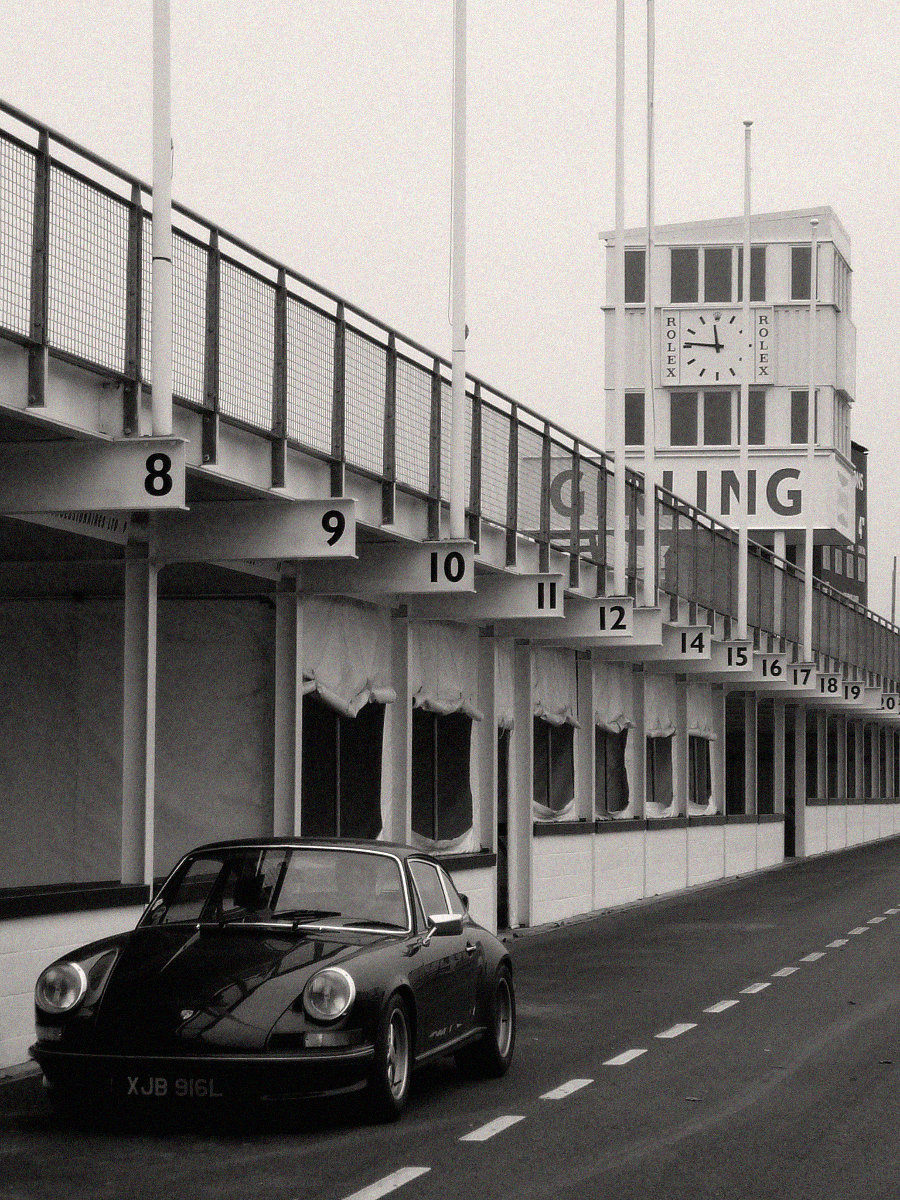
The Goodwood Circuit pits in 2008

Goodwood became famous for its Glover Trophy non-championship Formula One race, the Goodwood Nine Hours sports car endurance races run in 1952, 1953 and 1955, and the Tourist Trophy sports car race, run here between 1958 and 1964. The cars that raced in those events can be seen recreating (in shorter form) the endurance races at the Goodwood Revival each year in the Sussex trophy and the Royal Automobile Club Tourist Trophy (RAC TT).

The original circuit layout featured a fast left-hand curve between the Woodcote corner and the start-finish line, with the pit lane on the infield side of the curve's exit. Increasing car speeds made organisers aware of the dangers of a fast car losing control at this curve, and after Giuseppe Farina won the 1951 Goodwood Trophy race in his Alfa Romeo 159 at over 95 mph (153 km/h), the curve was replaced with a chicane in 1952. At first, the chicane was made using straw bales and boarding, before brick walls were constructed in 1953. Despite a number of accidents this brick chicane survived until the circuit's closure for racing in 1966, before it was rammed and destroyed in the mid-1970s by a transporter belonging to Team Surtees that was leaving the circuit after a test session. When the circuit was restored in the late 1990s, the chicane was remade using polystyrene blocks.

Goodwood has, over the years, played host to many famous drivers: Mike Hawthorn and Graham Hill had their first single seat races here, Roger Penske visited in 1963, and Jim Clark and Jack Sears competed in 1964. The accident that ended Stirling Moss's international career happened at St. Mary's in 1962.

Donald Campbell demonstrated his Bluebird CN7 Land Speed Record car at Goodwood in July 1960 at its initial public launch, and again in July 1962, before the car was shipped to Australia – where it finally broke the record in 1964. The car was a 30 ft-long (9.1 m) Bristol Siddeley turbine-powered 4,500 hp (3,400 kW) streamliner, with a theoretical top speed of 450 to 500 mph (720 to 800 km/h). The laps of Goodwood were effectively at "tick-over" speed, because the car had only four degrees of steering lock, with a maximum of 100 mph (160 km/h) on the straight on one lap.

Goodwood saw its last race meeting for over 30 years in 1966, because the owners did not want to modify the track with more chicanes to control the increased speeds of modern racing cars. The last event of the era was a club meeting organised by the British Automobile Racing Club on 2 July 1966. The lap record was 1 minute and 20.4 seconds, set by both Jackie Stewart and Jim Clark, in the 1965 Glover Trophy, the final Formula One race at the circuit.

=== Goodwood Nine Hours ===
Year	Date	Drivers	Vehicle	Laps completed	Notes
1952	16 August	Peter Collins/Pat Griffith	Aston Martin DB3	283	
1953	22 August	Reg Parnell/Eric Thompson	Aston Martin DB3S	297	
1955	20 August	Peter Walker/Dennis Poore	Aston Martin DB3S	309	

== Testing ==
The circuit claimed the life of McLaren founder Bruce McLaren in a testing accident on 2 June 1970. The accident happened on Lavant Straight, when a rear bodywork failure on his McLaren M8D Can-Am car caused it to spin and leave the track, hitting a bunker. The car would go on to win the opening event of that year's Can-Am Championship.

== Events ==
=== Goodwood Revival ===
Following the success of the Festival of Speed hill climb, racing returned to the Goodwood circuit in 1998. The Goodwood Revival is a three-day festival held each September for the types of cars and motorcycles that would have competed during the circuit's original period, 1948–1966. Historic aircraft help to complete the vintage feel. In 2008, a crowd of 68,000 people attended the event on the main Sunday - 9,000 more than in 2007. The track is now used for classic races, track days, and try-out days. Nearly everyone dresses up in vintage outfit from mods and rockers to racing drivers and just smart period clothes.

=== Other events ===
In 2009, the Mongol Rally, a charity fundraising car rally to Mongolia, moved its starting point from Hyde Park, London to Goodwood. Entrants are on show to the public in the paddock before beginning the rally with a parade lap of the circuit.

The National Finals of the Greenpower schools electric car racing challenge takes place at Goodwood each year. The Greenpower challenge is a nationwide series of electric vehicle endurance races for schools, who build their own 24 volt single-seater racing cars. There is also a corporate version of the race, featuring teams like Lola, Jaguar Land Rover, Bentley Motors and Prodrive.

The 'Breakfast Club' was introduced in March 2006. This is a semi regular free to enter, and open-to-all monthly gathering of drivers and riders who come to view each other's cars, bikes etc. Each meeting is themed with striking examples of the day’s theme paraded on the start finish straight.

The circuit also hosted the 1982 UCI Road World Championships for cycle racing, notable for the men's professional race, which saw a late breakaway by the American rider Jacques Boyer being closed down by a pack led by Boyer's teammate (and future triple Tour de France winner and double Road World Champion) Greg LeMond.

The circuit was used as a filming location in the historical drama series Downton Abbey.

In May 2019 the track was added into Gran Turismo Sport as a free update.

In 2020, due to the COVID-19 pandemic, the Festival of Speed, members and Revival meetings were cancelled and replaced by an event called Speedweek combining elements from all three events.

== Race lap records ==
The all-time outright lap record is 1:09.914, set by Nick Padmore in an Arrows A11, during the 2020 Goodwood Speedweek timed shootout event. The fastest official race lap records at the Goodwood Circuit are listed as:

Category	Time	Driver	Vehicle	Event
Full Circuit (1952–present): 2.400 mi (3.862 km)
Group 7	1:18.217	Nick Padmore	Lola T70	2015 Goodwood 73rd Members' Meeting
Formula One	1:20.4	Jackie Stewart (Note: Both drivers took the same lap time independently.); Jim Clark	BRM P261; Lotus 25	1965 Sunday Mirror Trophy
Group 4	1:20.8	Jim Clark	Lotus 30	1965 Goodwood International - Lavant Cup
Formula Two	1:22.2	Denny Hulme	Brabham BT18	1966 Sunday Mirror Trophy
Sports car racing	1:23.8	Bruce McLaren	Zerex Special	1964 RAC Tourist Trophy
Group 3	1:26.256	Emanuele Pirro	AC Cobra Le Mans Coupé	2017 Goodwood 75th Members' Meeting
Original Circuit (1948–1951): 2.380 mi (3.830 km)
Formula One	1:28.0	Giuseppe Farina	Alfa Romeo 159	1951 Goodwood Trophy
Voiturette	1:39.0	Stirling Moss	HWM 51	1951 Madgwick Cup
Sports car racing	1:39.6	Stirling Moss	Jaguar C-type	1951 Goodwood Sportscar race

== See also ==
- Brighton Speed Trials
- British Automobile Racing Club
- Firle Hill Climb
- Gurston Down Motorsport Hillclimb
- Lewes Speed Trials
- Thruxton Circuit in Thruxton, Hampshire
- Brooklands circuit in Weybridge, Surrey
