= Jet =

Jet most commonly refers to:

- Jet aircraft, an aircraft propelled by jet engines
- Jet engine, used to propel jet aircraft
- Jet (gemstone), a black or brown semi-precious mineraloid
- Jet (fluid), a coherent stream of fluid that is projected into a surrounding medium, usually from some kind of a nozzle or aperture

Jet, Jets, or The Jet(s) may also refer to:

== Arts and media ==
=== Fictional characters ===
- Jet (DC Comics), a comic book character from New Guardians
- Jet, a fictional dog in the Famous Five book Five on a Secret Trail
- Jet, a character from the cartoon Avatar: The Last Airbender
- The Jets, a gang in the 1957 Broadway musical West Side Story
- Jet Alone, a character from the Neon Genesis Evangelion anime series
- Jet Black, from the anime Cowboy Bebop; see List of Cowboy Bebop characters
- Jet Fusion, a cartoon character from The Adventures of Jimmy Neutron: Boy Genius
- Jet Jackson, from the 1950s TV show Jet Jackson, Flying Commando
- Jett Jackson, from the 1999–2001 TV show The Famous Jett Jackson
- Jet Jaguar, from the 1973 film Godzilla vs. Megalon
- Jet Link (Cyborg 002), a character from Cyborg 009
- Jet the Hawk, in the Sonic the Hedgehog franchise video games and comics
- Jet Propulsion, the title character from the animated series Ready Jet Go!
- Jet Vac, a video game character from the Skylanders universe; see Skylanders Academy
- Jett, a playable video game character from Valorant

=== Music ===
==== Albums and songs ====
- The Jets (album), by Minnesota band The Jets
- Jet (album), 1997, by Katell Keineg
- "Jet" (song), a 1974 single by Paul McCartney & Wings
- "Jet (Jet, My Love)", a song by Nat King Cole
- "Jet", a song by Basement from Further Sky
- "Jet", a song by SM Town from 2022 Winter SM Town: SMCU Palace

==== Music groups ====
- Jet (band), an Australian rock band with the Cester brothers
- Jet (British band), a one-album British glam rock band from London, active 1974–1976, and afterward re-formed as Radio Stars
- The Jets, a Trinidadian band with Lynn Taitt
- The Jets (Dutch band), a Dutch pop group of the 1960s
- The Jets (Minnesota band), a Tongan-American pop, R&B, dance, and religious-music band
- The Jets (British band), rockabilly band, who had a hit single in February 1982 with "Love Makes The World Go Round"
- The Jets (Illinois band), an American 1970s rock band from Pekin, Illinois
- J.E.T., an Italian-progressive-rock band related to Matia Bazar
- JETS, an electronic music duo consisting of Jimmy Edgar and Travis Stewart

==== Other uses in music ====
- Jet Records, a record label

=== Periodicals ===
- Jet (magazine), an African-American-themed magazine
- Journal of Economic Theory, an academic journal in the field of economics
- Journal of the Evangelical Theological Society, a refereed theological journal
- Journal of Evolution and Technology

=== Other media ===
- Jet, alternate name for Ground Control, a 1998 American thriller
- Jet (video game), a 1985 fighter-jet simulation game

== Businesses and organizations ==
=== Airlines ===
- Jet Airways, an Indian airline
- Super Air Jet, an Indonesian airline
- Wind Jet, an Italian airline (ICAO code JET)

=== Sports teams ===
- Ipswich Jets, an Australian rugby league team
- New York Jets, an American football team
- Newcastle United Jets, an Australian association football club
- Newtown Jets, an Australian rugby league team
- Winnipeg Jets, a professional ice hockey team
- Winnipeg Jets (1972–96), a former professional ice hockey team

=== Other businesses ===
- Jet (brand), a filling-station brand name
- Jet Records, a record label
- Japan Entertainment Television, abbreviated JET TV
- Jet's Pizza, an American pizza franchise restaurant
- Jet.com, an e-commerce retail site owned by Walmart

=== Other organizations ===
- Jet Propulsion Laboratory
- Jewish Educational Trade School, a technical college and high school for young Jewish men
- Jordan Evangelical Theological Seminary
- Junior Engineering Technical Society, a non-profit educational organization

== People ==
- Jet (name), given name, generally feminine in Dutch, masculine in English
- Jet Li (born 1963), Chinese film actor, producer and martial artist
- Kenny "the Jet" Smith (born 1965), American basketball commentator and former player
- Benny Urquidez (born 1952), kickboxer, choreographer and actor known as "The Jet"
- Jason Eugene Terry (born 1977), American basketball player nicknamed "JET"
- Jay Emmanuel-Thomas (born 1990), English association football player nicknamed "JET"
- Jet (Diane Youdale, born 1970), one of the stars of Gladiators
- Jet (Monica Carlson), Women's Champion of the first season of American Gladiators

== Science, technology, and mathematics ==
=== Computing ===
- Java Emitter Templates
- Access Database Engine, a Microsoft database engine formerly referred to as Jet Red
- Samsung Jet, a mobile-phone handset

=== Mathematics ===
- Jet (mathematics), an operation on a differentiable function
- Jet bundle, a fiber bundle of jets in differential topology
- Jet group, a group of jets in differential topology

=== Physics ===
- Jet (fluid), a coherent stream of fluid projected into a surrounding medium, usually from a nozzle or other aperture
- Jet (particle physics), a cone of particles produced by the hadronization of a quark or gluon
- Astrophysical jet, a stream of matter emitted along the axis of a rotating astronomical body
- Joint European Torus, an experimental nuclear fusion machine

=== Vehicles and vehicle technology ===
- Jet aircraft, an aircraft propelled by jet engines
  - Jet airliner
  - Business jet
  - Fighter jet, a type of military aircraft
  - Very light jet
    - Cirrus Vision SF50, originally called "The-Jet by Cirrus"
    - Eclipse 400, originally called "Eclipse Concept Jet"
    - Honda HA-420 HondaJet
    - Piper PA-47 PiperJet
- Jet engine, used to propel jet aircraft
- Jet fuel, burned in jet engines
- Jet pack, a backpack personal flying device containing a jet motor
- Journey to Enceladus and Titan (JET), a proposed astrobiology orbiter to Saturn
- Matra Djet (Matra Sports Jet), a French sports car

=== Other uses in science and technology ===
- Jet (gemstone), a black or brown semi-precious mineraloid
- Jet, type of nozzle used on gas cookers and in other applications
- Jets, a form of upper-atmospheric lightning
- Jet stream, in meteorology
- Junctional ectopic tachycardia, a rare condition in infants

== Other uses ==
- Jet, Oklahoma, US
- Jet of Iada (1942–1949), Dickin Medal-winning dog
- JET Programme, the Japan Exchange and Teaching Programme, for teaching English

== See also ==
- Jett (disambiguation)
