= Matra 530 =

Matra M530
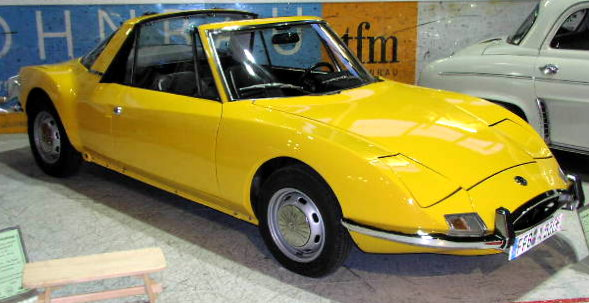

Overview
- Manufacturer: Matra Automobiles
- Also called: Matra Sports M530 A Matra Sports M530 LX/SX
- Production: 1967–1973
- Assembly: France: Romorantin-Lanthenay
- Designer: Philippe Guédon (original design); Studio Michelotti (1970 facelift)

Body and chassis
- Class: Sports car
- Body style: 2-door targa top 2+2
- Layout: MR layout
- Related: Taunus 15M TS (running gear); Renault 16 (headlights)

Powertrain
- Engine: 1.7 L Taunus OHV V4
- Transmission: 4-speed manual

Dimensions
- Wheelbase: 2.65 m (104.3 in)
- Length: 4.197 m (165.2 in)
- Width: 1.62 m (63.8 in)
- Height: 1.20 m (47.2 in)
- Curb weight: 935 kg (2,061 lb) (LX); 915 kg (2,017 lb) (SX)

Chronology
- Predecessor: Matra Djet
- Successor: Matra Bagheera

The Matra Sports M530 is a sports car created and built by the French engineering group Matra. It was in production from 1967 to 1973.

== Development ==
In 1965 Matra's CEO Jean-Luc Lagardère decided to develop a successor to the Matra Djet that was more appealing to the non-racing public — a voiture des copains (car for friends). The resulting Matra M530 was the first "true" Matra sports car, the Djet having been a René Bonnet design. The car was named after Matra's R.530 missile, and was designed by former Simca designer Philippe Guédon, with the body styled by Jacques Nochet.

== Features ==
Although both the Djet and the M530 had glass reinforced plastic (GRP) bodywork and mid-engine layouts, the Djet used a relatively simple steel backbone chassis with a large-diameter centre spine and an engine cradle and outriggers of smaller diameter square-section steel tube, while the M530 was built on a steel platform chassis with perforations for lightness. To accommodate a mid-mounted engine and yet still provide 2+2 seating and a reasonable boot, various engine options were considered. In the end, the running gear came from the Ford Mustang I prototype by way of Ford Germany. The "high compression" 1699 cc Ford Taunus V4 engine and transaxle combination from the Taunus 15M TS was compact enough to fit between the rear seats and the boot.

Other noteworthy features of the M530 were its targa top roof, hidden headlamps and avant-garde design.

== M530/M530 A ==
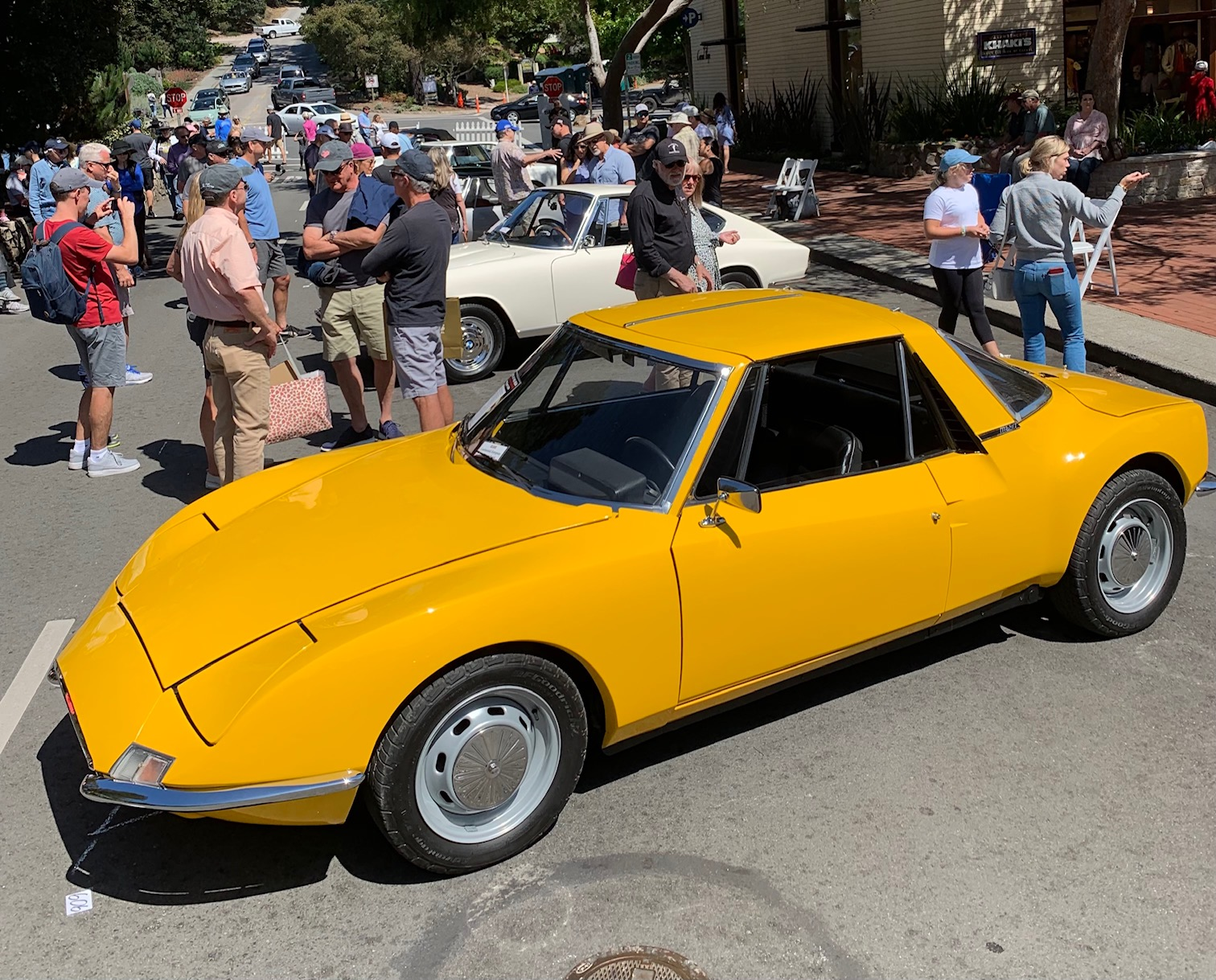
1969 Matra M530A displayed at Carmel Concours 2019

The Matra Sports M530 debuted on 7 March 1967 at the Geneva Motor Show. With 70 DIN hp from its Ford V4 engine, the car had a top speed of 175 km/h (109 mph). It entered production in April, incorporating modifications that included a new chrome bumper bar to provide much-needed protection for the front grille, a modestly reshaped dashboard to give the passenger more knee room, and a repositioned ignition key to facilitate access. For its first two years of production, the chassis was built by Carrier in Alençon and final assembly was done by French coachbuilder Brissonneau et Lotz at Creil. The engine bay of early M530s was accessible by removing its acrylic glass rear window.

1969 brought many changes to the M530. Firstly, the engine benefited from changes made by Ford to their own product line, including use of a different carburetor, which raised power output to 75 CV (55 kW). Secondly, Matra closed a deal with Chrysler Europe, to sell their cars through the Simca dealer network from 1970 onwards and jointly develop the M530's successor. Thirdly, the cars were now entirely constructed at the Matra Automobiles factory in Romorantin. Lastly, the car was now badged M530 A.

British magazine "Autocar" tested a Matra M530 A in March 1969. The car had a top speed of 95 mph (153 km/h) and accelerated from 0-60 mph (97 km/h) in 15.6 seconds. An "overall" fuel consumption of 26.9 miles per imperial gallon (10.5 L/100 km; 22.4 mpg_{‑US}) was recorded. This put it significantly behind the similarly priced Lotus Elan +2 on performance, but the two cars were closely matched on fuel economy. The Matra's £2,160 manufacturer's recommended price was a little lower than the £2,244 price on the Lotus, but both were massively undercut by the £1,217 then being asked for the MG MGB GT which, although based on an older simpler design, sold in greater numbers. Also included in the price comparison was the Porsche 912 then being offered in the UK with a manufacturer's recommended retail price of £2,894. The testers commended the Matra's refinement, handling and steering, soundness of construction and finish, while noting that its performance was 'not outstanding'.

== M530 LX ==
Introduced at the 1970 Geneva Motor Show, the Matra Sports M530 LX was a minor redesign of the M530 A by Michelotti. Notable changes included a new glass rear hatch held open with struts, and a new front bumper.

== M530 SX ==
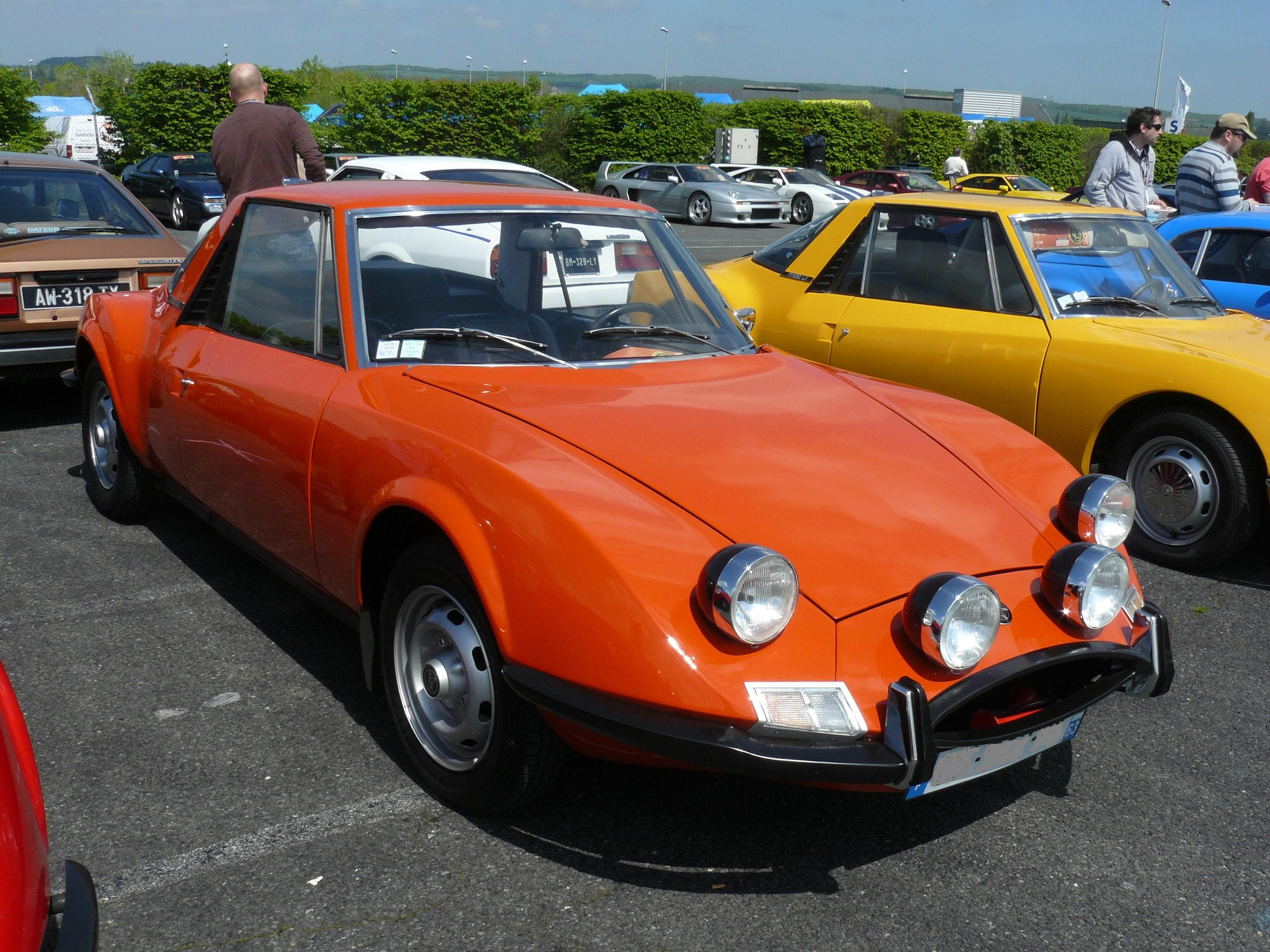
Matra M530 SX

A budget version of the M530, the Matra Sports M530 SX, was introduced in October 1971 with a price under 20,000 francs. The SX has a fixed roof, and instead of hidden headlamps has four fixed lamps mounted on its nose. The only available colours were yellow and white, and the SX features black bumpers instead of the LX's chrome ones.

== Production numbers ==
Production of the M530 ceased in 1973 after a total of 9,609 cars (2,062 M530, 1,669 M530 A, 4,731 M530 LX and 1,146 M530 SX) were built.

No right-hand drive M530s were built.

== Customs and Specials ==
=== Delaunay M530 ===
French artist Sonia Delaunay, creator of the Orphism art style that emphasized colour and geometric shapes, painted a pre-production M530 at the request of Lagardère in 1968.

=== Vignale M530 ===
Carrozzeria Alfredo Vignale presented a custom bodied M530 coupé designed by Virginio Vairo at the Geneva show in 1968. The car appeared again in Turin with some modifications and a new paint scheme.

=== Michelotti Matra Laser ===
Giovanni Michelotti developed a one-off M530-based "Laser" design study that featured gull-wing doors. The car was first shown in yellow at the 1971 Geneva Motor Show, and the next year appeared at the 1972 Montreal Auto Salon in silver. The car's location was unknown for several years, until it surfaced at the second Tokyo Concours d’Elegance in 2009.

=== Diebold M530 ===
French designer and one-time Renault employee Camille Diebold designed a custom body for the M530 in 1973. Construction on the car began in 1974, and was completed by 1975.

=== M530 V6 ===
A special M530 was prepared by British engineering firm and engine specialist Weslake for the Critérium des Cévennes. The Taunus V4 in this car was replaced by a Ford Cologne V6 engine. The car did not race.

=== M540 ===
Built using the chassis of the M530 V6, this car had the Ford engine replaced by a Simca Type 180 inline four cylinder engine. Created after Chrysler-France assumed control of Matra, the changes necessary to adapt the transaxle to the Chrysler engine made this version too expensive to produce.

== Gallery ==
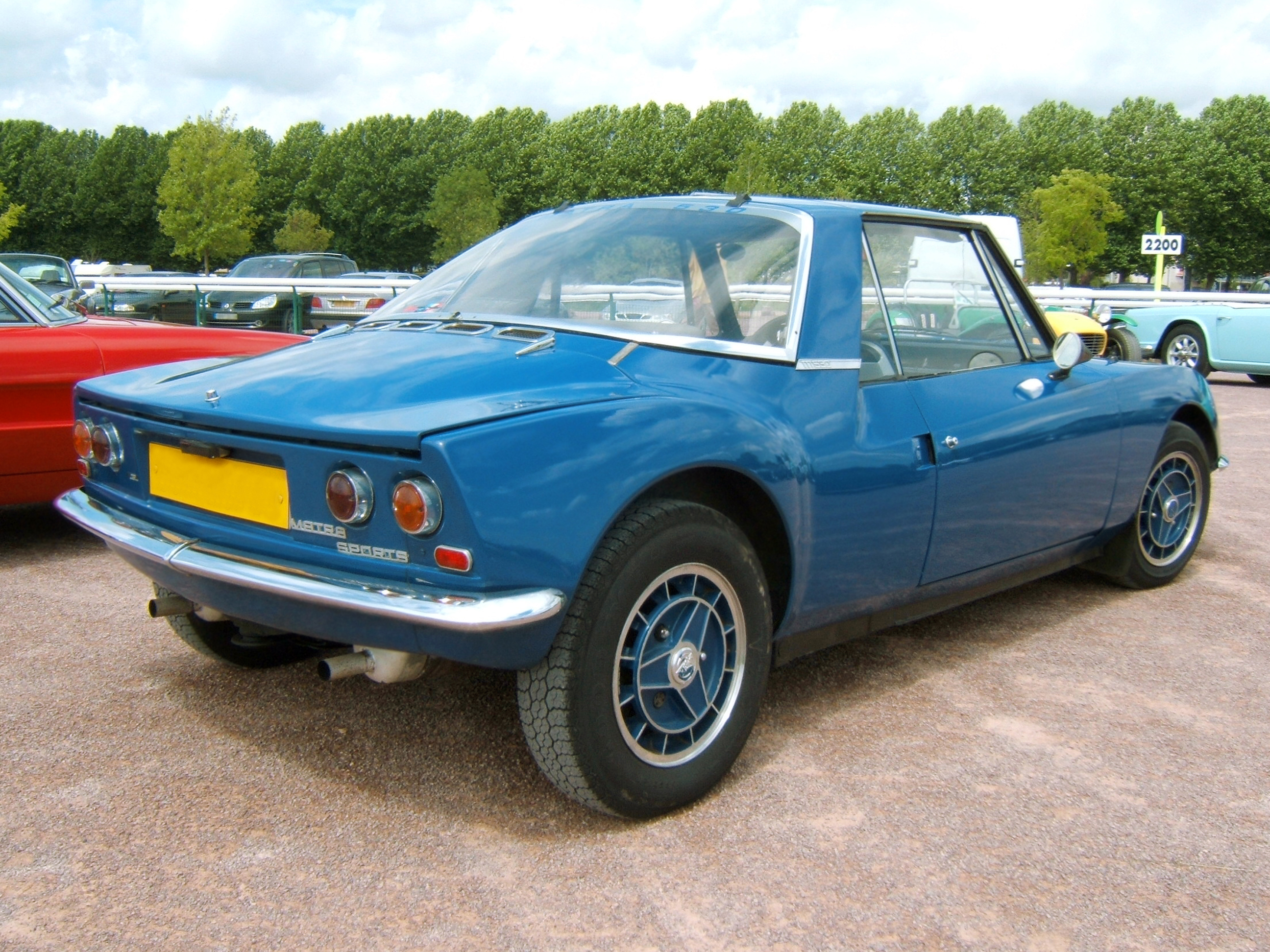
Matra M530 rear view

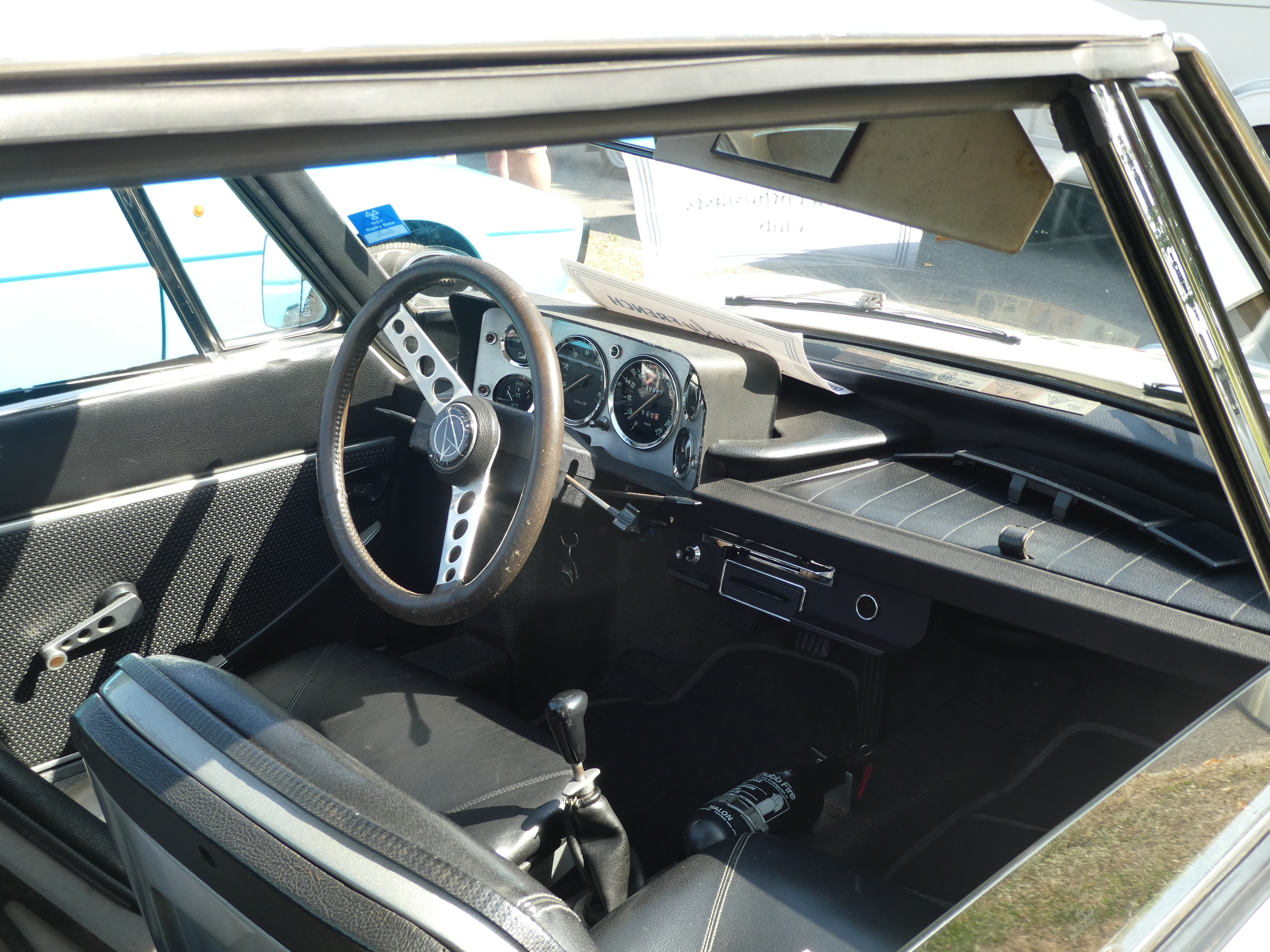
M530 interior

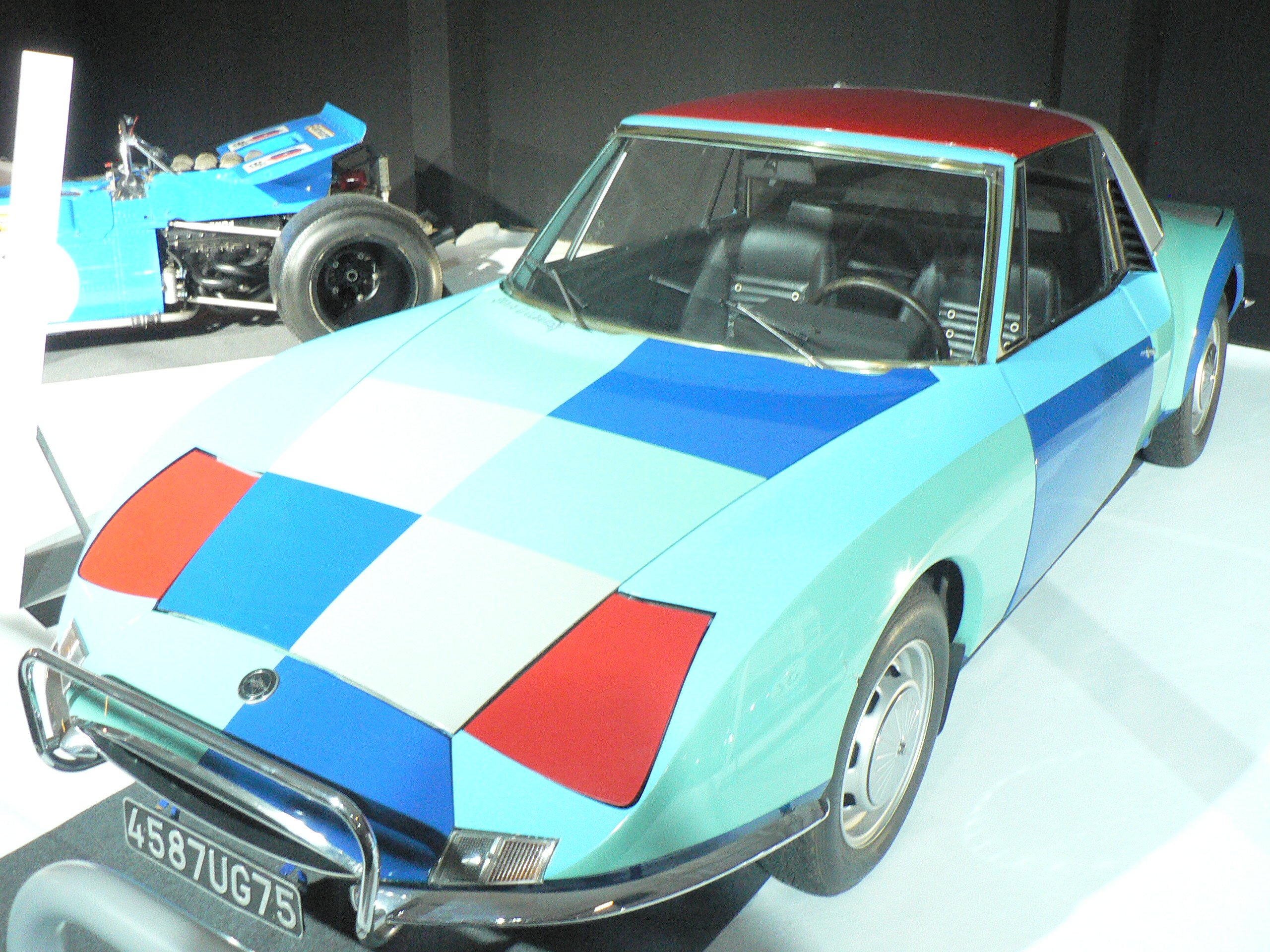
M530 painted by Sonia Delaunay

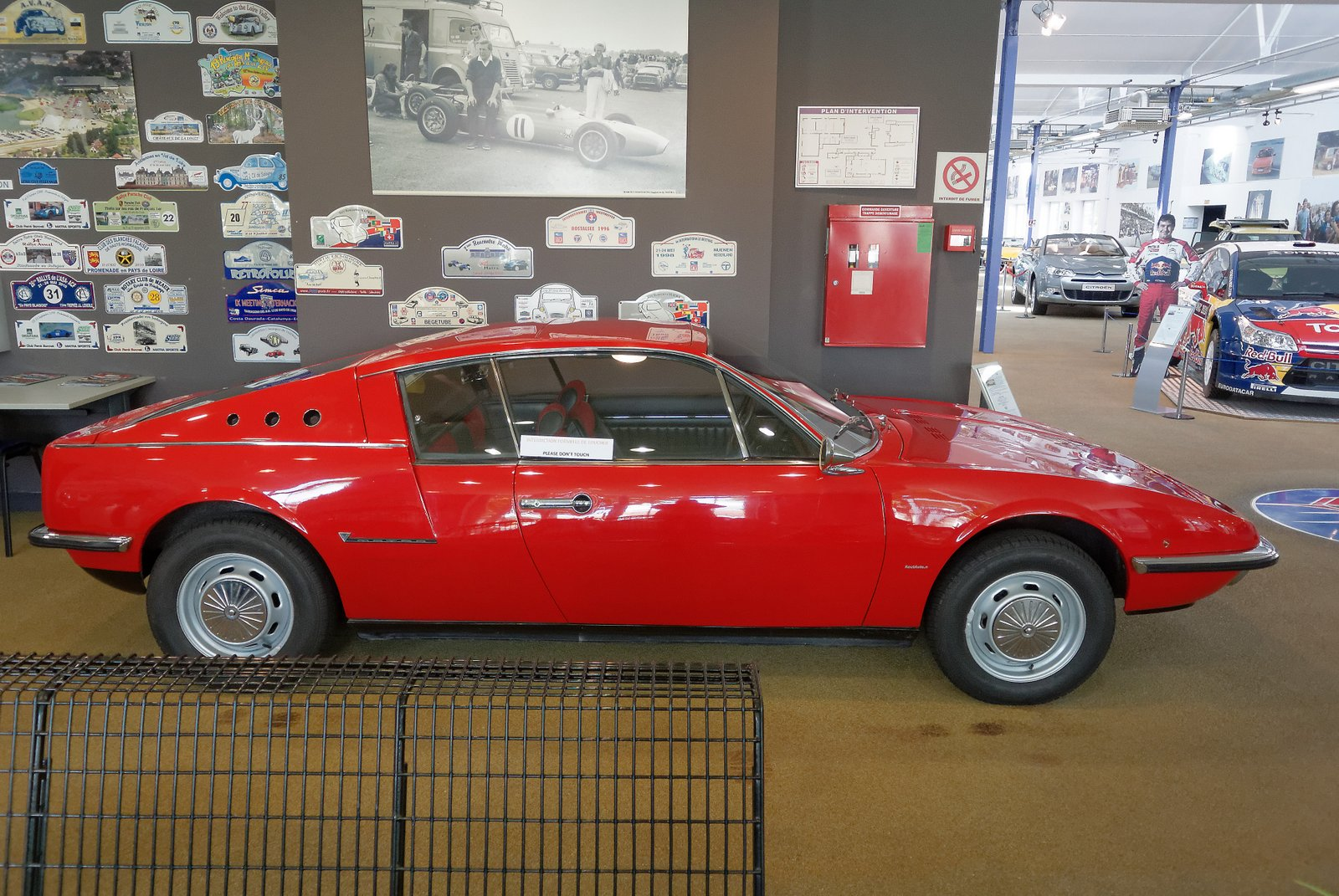
M530 by Vignale

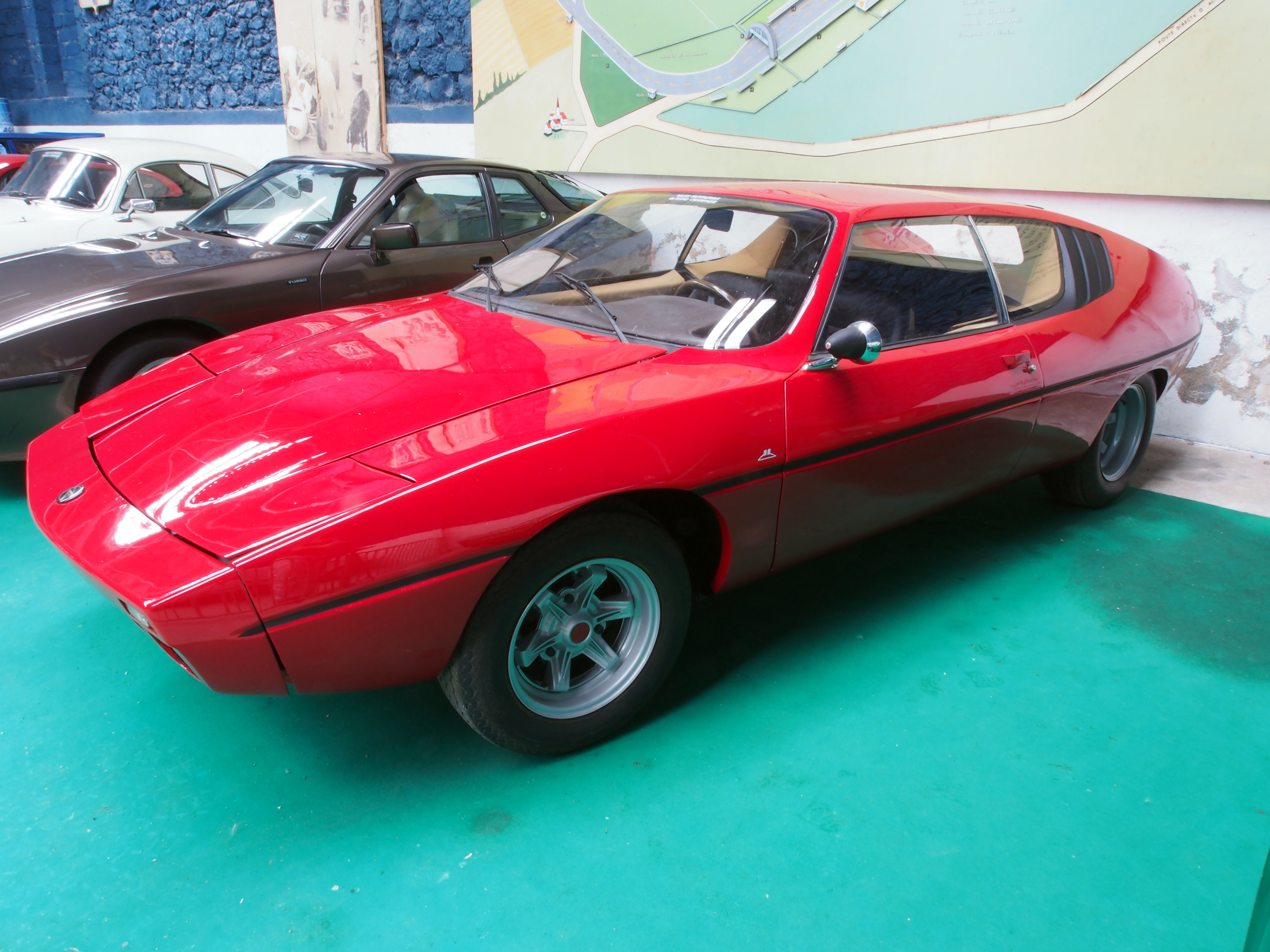
M530 by Camille Diebold

== Technical specifications ==
Model	M530	M530A	M530 LX	M530 SX
Years of production	March 1967 to April 1969	April 1969 to March 1970	March 1970 to February 1973	September 1971 to February 1973
Units produced	2063	1669	4731	1146
Engine	Ford Taunus V4 Type P5S	Ford Taunus V4 Type C3		
Position and orientation	Rear-mid engine, longitudinal			
Number and arrangement of cylinders	4 cylinders in 60° "V"			
Bore x Stroke	90 mm × 66.8 mm (3.5 in × 2.6 in)			
Displacement	1,699 cc (103.7 cu in)			
Carburation	One single-barrel Solex 32 PDSIT4 carburetor	One two-barrel Solex 32 TDID carburetor		
Valvetrain	Single cam-in-block with pushrod actuated overhead valves. 2 valves per cylinder.			
Compression ratio	9.0:1			
Maximum horsepower	54.4 kW (73 hp) at 4800 rpm	58.2 kW (78 hp) at 5000 rpm		
Maximum torque	132 N⋅m (97.4 lb⋅ft) at 2800 rpm			
Clutch	Dry single-plate			
Driven wheels	Rear			
Transmission	4-speed manual			
Chassis	Platform chassis in sheet steel with perforations for lightness. Fibreglass bodywork attached to chassis.			
Front suspension	Upper and lower wishbones, coil springs, telescopic dampers, anti-roll bar			
Rear suspension	Trailing arms, coil springs, telescopic dampers, anti-roll bar			
Braking	Dual hydraulic circuit. Disk brakes on all four wheels			
Weight	860 kg (1,896.0 lb)			
Fuel capacity	45 L (11.9 US gal)			
Maximum speed	170 km/h (105.6 mph)			
Average fuel consumption	11.1 l/100 km (25 mpg_{‑imp}; 21 mpg_{‑US})			
