= Jet (name) =

Jet is a given name which may be either masculine or feminine. It is relatively common in Dutch-speaking countries, as a nickname for certain feminine given names (for example, Henriëtte or Mariëtte), and is pronounced [jɛt] in that context. It is rarer in English-speaking countries, where it is generally a masculine nickname or adopted name, pronounced /dʒɛt/.

- Jet Black (1938–2022), English drummer, member of The Stranglers
- Jet Bussemaker (Mariëtte, born 1961), Dutch politician
- Jet Greaves (born 2001), Canadian ice hockey goaltender
- Jet Harris (1939–2011), English bass guitarist, member of The Shadows
- Jet Jongeling (born 1977), Dutch cyclist
- Jet Jurgensmeyer (born 2004), American actor
- Jet Li (born 1963), Chinese martial artist and actor
- Jet Lowe, American photographer
- Jet Naessens (1915–2010), Belgian actress and director
- Jet O'Rourke, Australian musician
- Jet Rowland (2002–2004), Australian road accident victim
- Jet Tila (born 1975), American celebrity chef and restaurateur
- Jet van Noortwijk (Ariette, born 1968), Dutch cricketer
- Jet Zoon (born 1988), Dutch musician and composer
- Tateo Ozaki (born 1954), Japanese golfer, nicknamed "Jet"
