= Jett =

Jett may refer to:

== People by surname ==
- Brent W. Jett Jr. (born 1958), American astronaut and naval aviator
- Chip Jett (born 1974), American professional poker player; husband of Karina Jett
- Dennis Jett (born 1945), American diplomat and academic
- E. K. Jett (1893–1965), American radio engineer and Federal Communications Commission member
- Jack E. Jett (contemporary), American television talk show host
- James Jett (born 1970), American professional football player
- Joan Jett (born 1958), American rock musician and actress
- Joe Jett (born 1960), American politician from Arkansas
- Joey Jett (born 1998), American skateboarder
- John Jett (born 1968), American professional football player
- Karina Jett (born 1974), Vietnamese-American professional poker player; wife of Chip Jett
- Shane Jett (born 1974), American politician from Oklahoma; state legislator
- Skyler Jett (born 1950s), American R&B and soul singer
- Terri Jett (fl. 2026) American political science professor
- Thomas M. Jett (1862–1939), American politician from Illinois; U.S. representative and jurist
- Jordair Jett (born 1991), American basketball player

== People by given name ==
- Jett Adore, American burlesque dancer
- Jett Howard (born 2003), American basketball player
- Jett Johnson (born 1999), American football player
- Jett Luchanko (born 2006), Canadian ice hockey player
- Jett Pangan (born 1968), Filipino singer and guitarist
- Jett Thomalla (born 2007), American football player
- Jett Thomas (1776–1817), American military officer and builder
- Jett Washington (born 2007), American football player
- Jett Williams (born 1953), American country music performer

== Other uses ==
- Jett, Kentucky, unincorporated community in Franklin County.
- Jett (TV series)
- JETT customer experience, Chinese consultant firm
- Jett Rebel, stage name of Jelte Steven Tuinstra
- Jett Fillmore, a major character in the film Goat
- Jett, a character in the TV series Super Wings
- Jett, a character in the video game Valorant
- Jett, racehorse who finished 8th in the 2021 Grand National and led for most of the race.
- Jett, a character in 2025 video game Pokémon Legends: Z-A
