= DB Le Mans =

1960 DB Le Mans Luxe
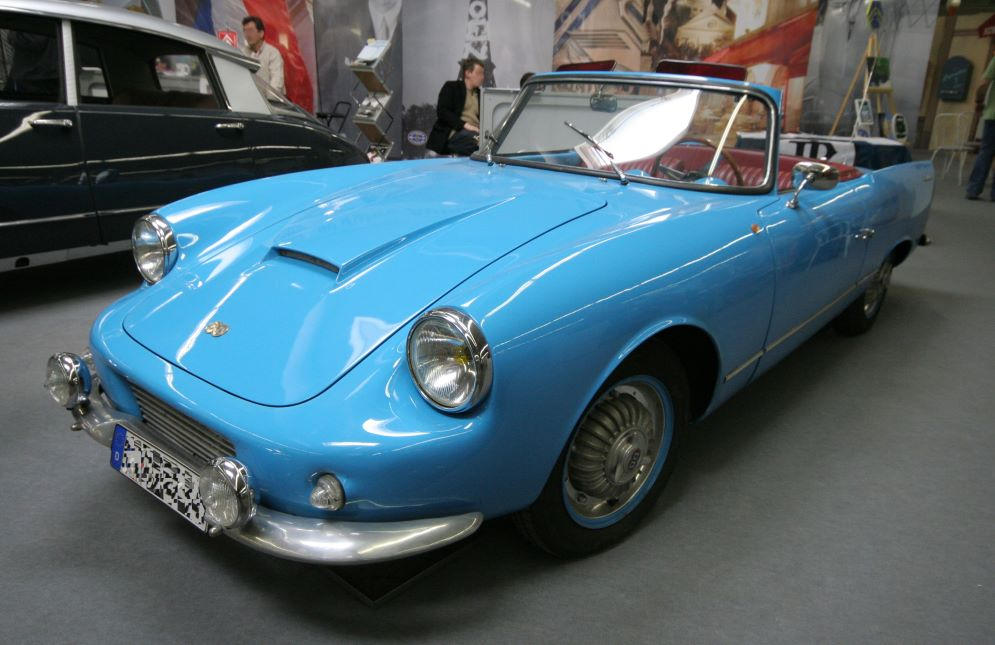

Overview
- Manufacturer: DB; Automobiles René Bonnet
- Also called: René Bonnet Le Mans; René Bonnet Missile
- Production: 1959 – April 1962; 232 built
- Assembly: Champigny-sur-Marne, France; Romorantin, France
- Designer: René & Claude Bonnet; Jacques Hubert

Body and chassis
- Body style: 2-door convertible 2-door coupé
- Layout: FF layout

Powertrain
- Engine: 702 cc Panhard H2; 848 cc Panhard Tigre H2; 954 cc Panhard H2; 845 cc Ventoux I4 (Bonnet Missile); 1,108 cc Cléon I4 (Bonnet Le Mans)
- Transmission: 4-speed manual

Dimensions
- Wheelbase: 2,400 mm (94 in)
- Length: 4,100 mm (160 in) (DB LM GL)
- Width: 1,600 mm (63 in)
- Height: 1,250 mm (49 in)
- Curb weight: 700 kg (1,500 lb)

Chronology
- Predecessor: DB Coach/HBR

The DB Le Mans (later also sold as the René Bonnet Le Mans and René Bonnet Missile) is a fibreglass-bodied two-door sports car with front-wheel drive, built in France from 1959 until 1964. Originally equipped with Panhard two-cylinder boxers, the cars built by René Bonnet had Renault four-cylinder engines. The car, with pronounced tailfins and more comfort than previous efforts by DB, was aimed squarely at the US market.

== DB Le Mans ==
Having met with some sales success (and many racing victories) in the United States, DB decided to make a bespoke car for the US market. The more comfortable Le Mans was the result, and to underscore the intentions of the producers it had its world premiere at the 1959 Boston Motor Show. The European debut was shortly thereafter, at the 1959 Paris Motor Show. The car was a two-seater convertible built on the usual Panhard underpinnings, with the 848 cc flat-twin "Tigre" engine, capable of 60 PS (44 kW) SAE at 6000 rpm. The DIN claim is 52 PS (38 kW). The promised top speed was 160 km/h (99 mph), putting performance on par with that of a period Porsche 356 "Dame" or an MGA. The design, with its pronounced tailfins and low long nose, was the work of René Bonnet and his son Claude, as well as young designer Jacques Hubert. Charles Deutsch was preoccupied with other projects and took little interest in the Le Mans.

Production was small-scale and artisanal, with the expected resultant quality issues (although things improved as production continued). As is expected, many parts from mass-produced vehicles were used, most notably a cut-down Citroën DS windshield. Sales were reasonably good, although the price was somewhat elevated.

=== Grand Luxe ===
In an effort to target luxury car buyers and the Facel Vega Facellia, DB presented a luxurious hardtop coupé called the Le Mans Grand Luxe at the 1961 Paris Salon. While billed as a four-seater, the rear bench was best suited for luggage. The body was the same as the convertible, minus the folding roof and with a permanent hardtop installed. The hardtop's design was very similar to the roof of the Facellia, and the Marchal Mégalux double headlights were exactly the same units as used on the Facel car. Leather interior and a wooden steering wheel were standard fitment, as were power windows - unusual for a specialist manufacturer at the time. For being of such limited utility, the car was rather expensive at the time of introduction - 18,500 francs, nearly twice the price of a Citroën ID19.

== René Bonnet era ==
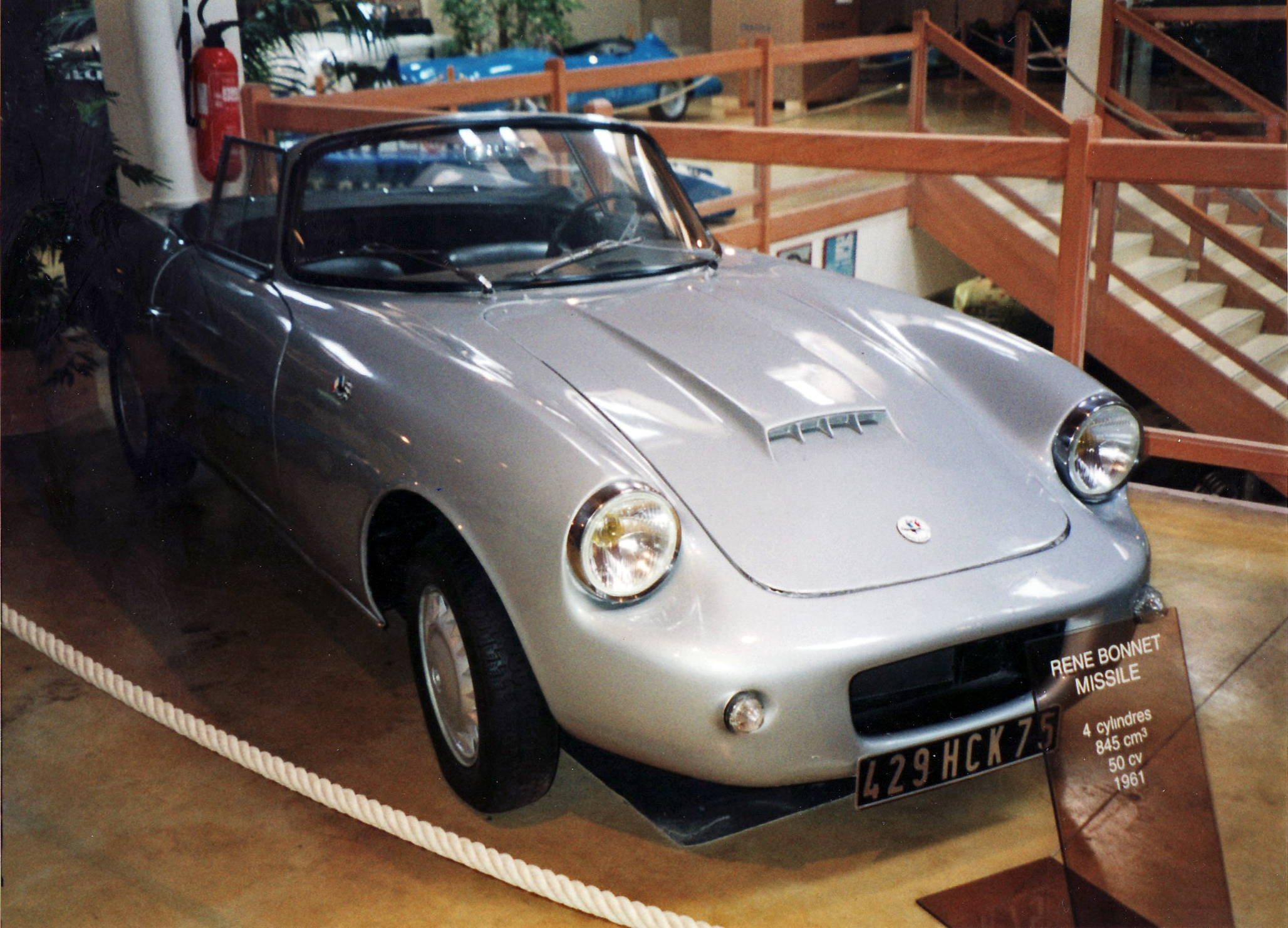
A 1961 René Bonnet Missile, a later redesigned version with Renault engines

After the split between Deutsch and Bonnet, René Bonnet reintroduced the Missile and the Le Mans under his own name and with Renault engines. The more luxurious Le Mans was a convertible with Renault's 1108 cc type 688 R8 engine tuned to produce 70 CV (51 kW). This engine was mounted ahead of the driving axle, whereas on the lower priced Missile it was mounted behind the front axle, in a front mid-engine location. The Missile, although with similar bodywork, also had single rather than the double headlights of the Le Mans. The Missile also had a lesser engine, in the form of the 845 cc type 670. The Missile has 50 CV (37 kW).
