= DB (car) =

Brand of sports cars

DEUTSCH-BONNET
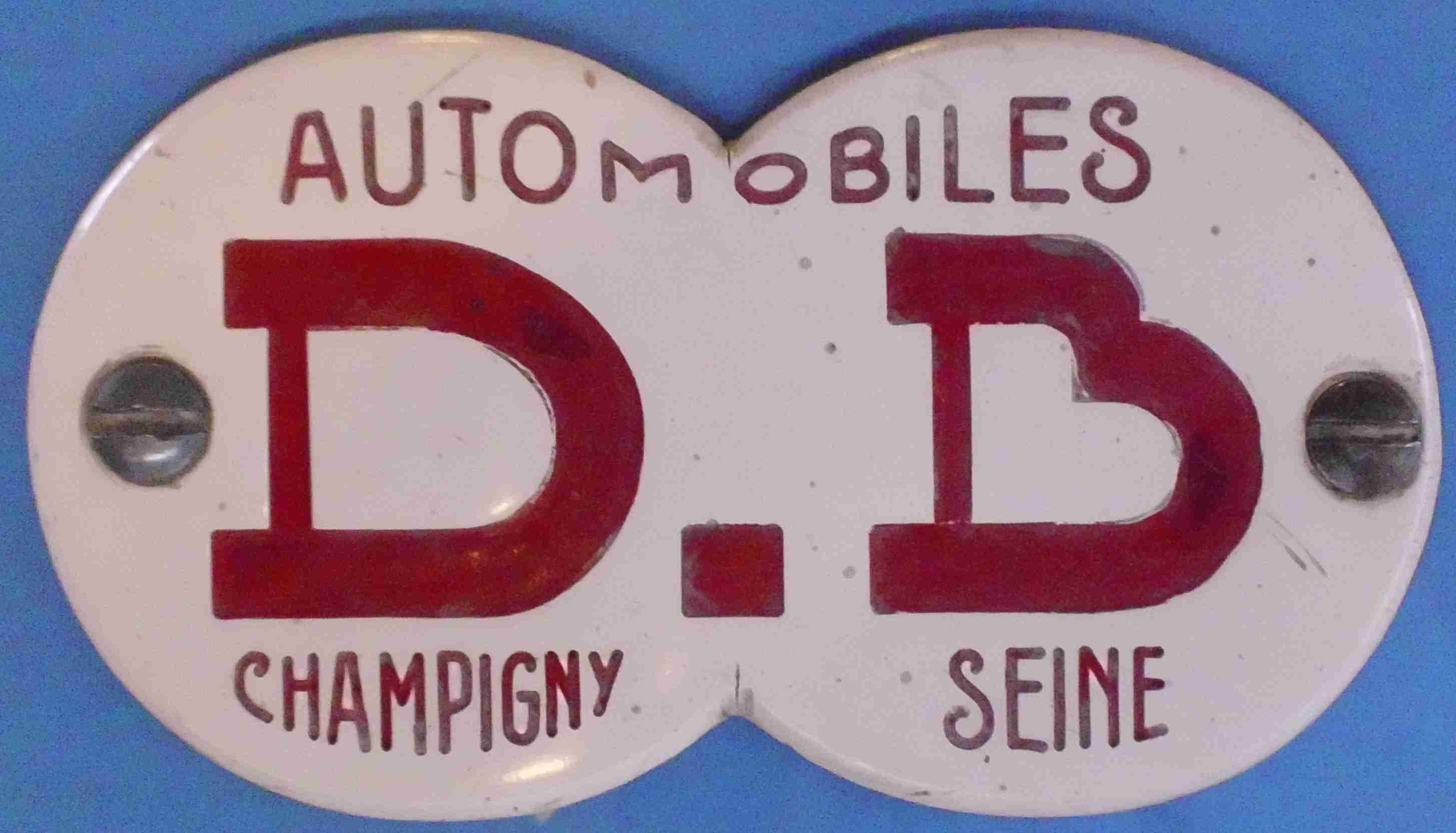
- Industry: Automobile
- Founded: 1937
- Founder: Charles Deutsch, René Bonnet
- Defunct: 1962
- Headquarters: Champigny sur Marne, France
- Products: Sports cars, automotive engineering

Deutsch-Bonnet (DB), is a brand of sports cars created in 1937 by Charles Deutsch and René Bonnet and disappeared in 1962.

The D.B Coupés, in racing or customer versions, were intensively involved in rallying and on international circuits: 24 Hours of Le Mans, 12 Hours of Sebring, 12 Hours of Reims, TdF Automobile (notably with Prince Rainier of Monaco at the wheel, who made the brand famous).

== History ==
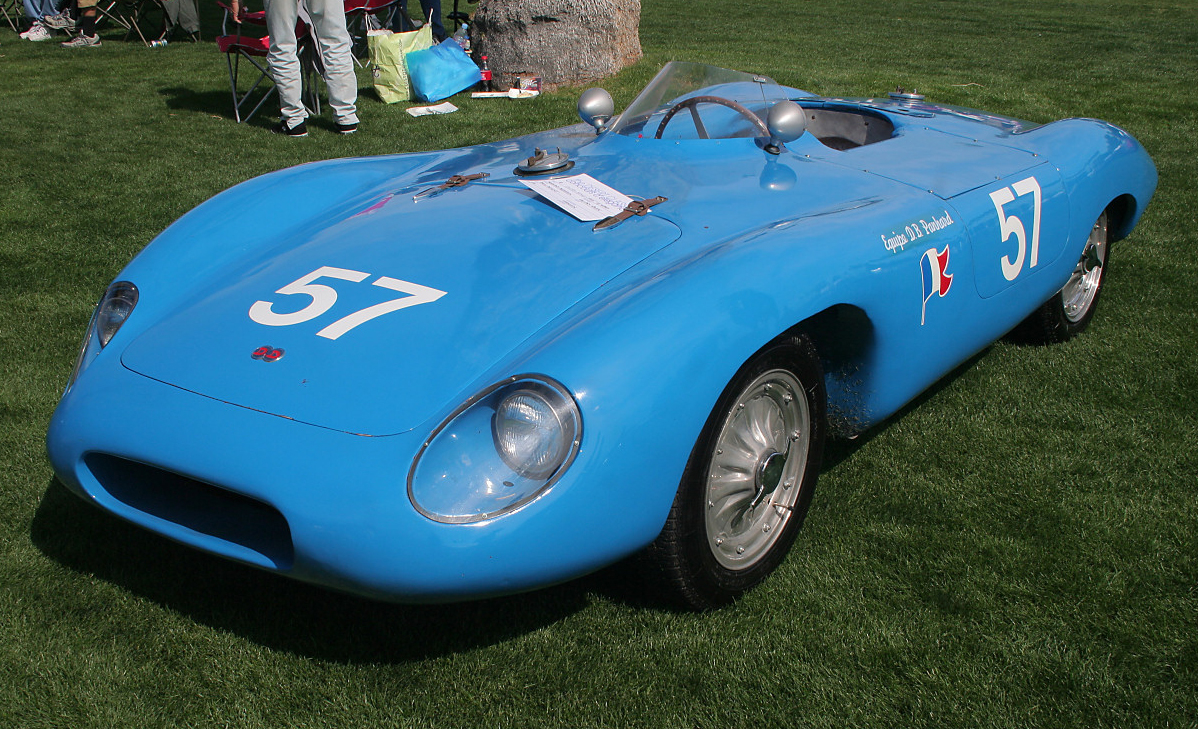
1955 DB Panhard HBR competition

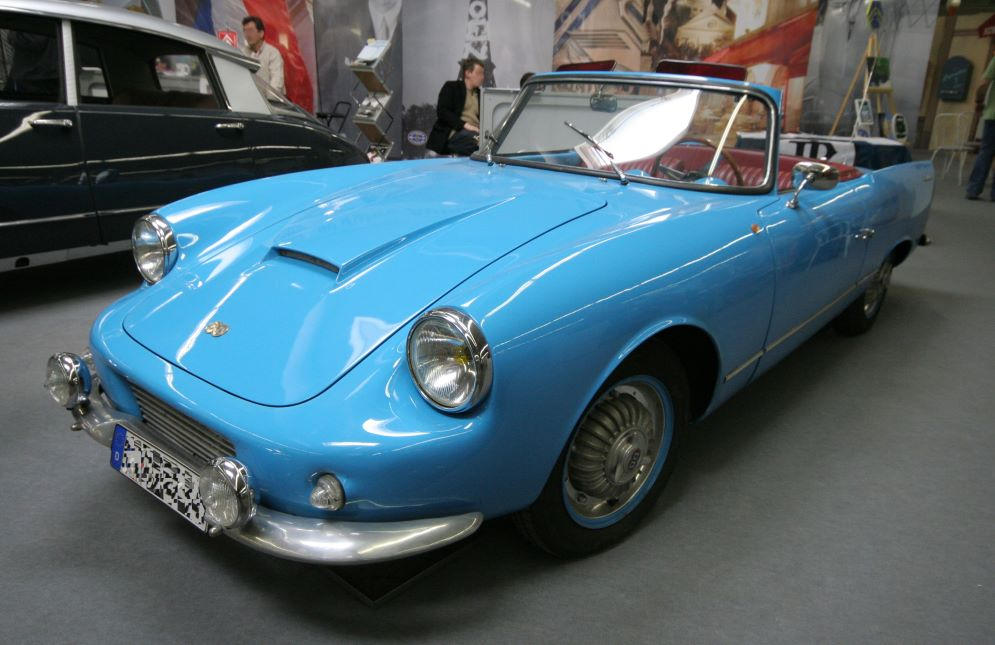
1960 DB Panhard Le Mans Luxe

DB (until 1947 known as Deutsch-Bonnet) was a French automobile maker between 1938 and 1961, based in Champigny-sur-Marne near Paris. The firm was founded by Charles Deutsch and René Bonnet, an offshoot of the Deutsch family's existing coachbuilding shop which had been taken over by Bonnet in 1932. Immediately before the war the partners concentrated on making light-weight racing cars, but a few years after the war, starting with the presentation of a Panhard based cabriolet at the 1950 Paris Motor Show, the company also began to produce small road-going sports cars. By 1952 the company no longer had its own stand at the Paris Motor Show, but one of their cars appeared as a star attraction on the large Panhard stand, reflecting the level of cooperation between the two businesses.

The company was defunct by 1961, as Deutsch and Bonnet's differing design philosophies hamstrung further cooperation. The number of DB's built is not certain; estimates of up to 2,000 cars are mentioned but more conservative numbers are closer to one thousand.

== Light-weight engineering ==
The business produced light sports cars, originally in steel or aluminium but subsequently with fibreglass bodies mainly powered by Panhard flat-twin engines, most commonly of 610, 744, or 848 cc. Deutsch was a "theoretical engineer who had a natural instinct for aerodynamics," while Bonnet was a more "pragmatic mechanical engineer".

The fibreglass bodies covered a tubular central beam chassis made from steel, with front wheel drive and four wheel independent suspension directly lifted from the Panhard donors. Until 1952 all DBs had been intended for competition purposes only.

== Racing origins ==
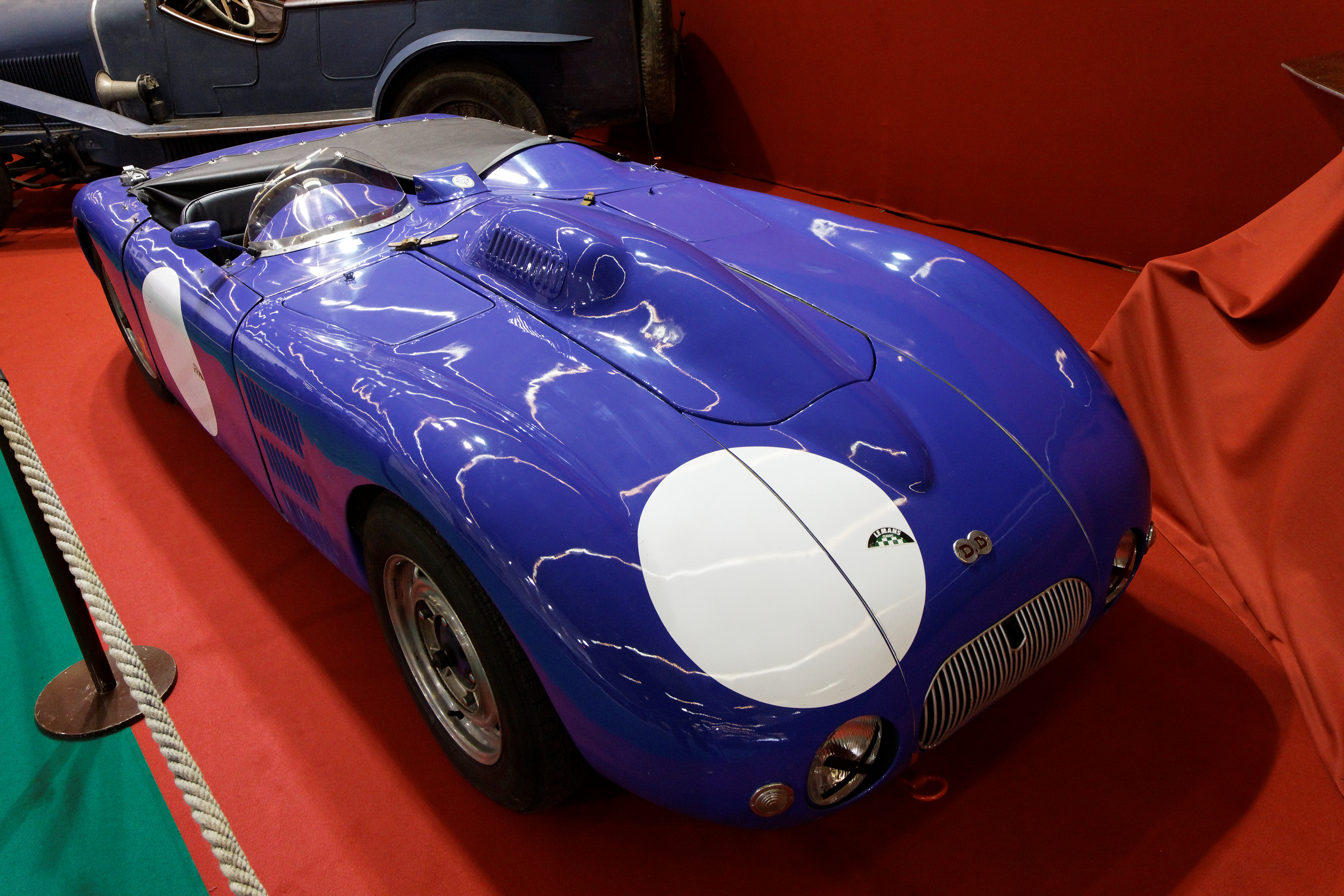
The 1945 Citroën-engined DB5, which competed at Le Mans in 1949 and 1950

Bonnet had been promised a works drive in an Amilcar Pégase in the 1936 French Grand Prix for sports cars, but when this failed to materialise they set about building their own racer. The 1938 alloy-bodied DB1 roadster was a special, built using the remains of a Citroën Traction Avant 11CV. The construction took seventeen months. A series of numbered successors followed. The close-roofed 1.5-litre DB2's career was hindered by the war and was sold later, without Deutsch ever using it. The DB3 was a monocoque project developed during the war, but was never built, as the improved pontoon-bodied DB4 took preference. With a central beam chassis with a forked cradle for the 1.5 litre Traction 7A-based engine (originally intended for the DB2) it was finished in July 1945, with most of the work having been carried out in secret during the occupation. The very similar 2-litre DB5 was finished soon thereafter. Their two specials both placed in the first postwar race in France, in Paris in 1945, being the only post-war cars entered. An open-wheeled DB7 appeared in 1947 (preceded by the heavy and large DB6 which saw very little action), after which the Automobiles Deutsch & Bonnet was officially formed.

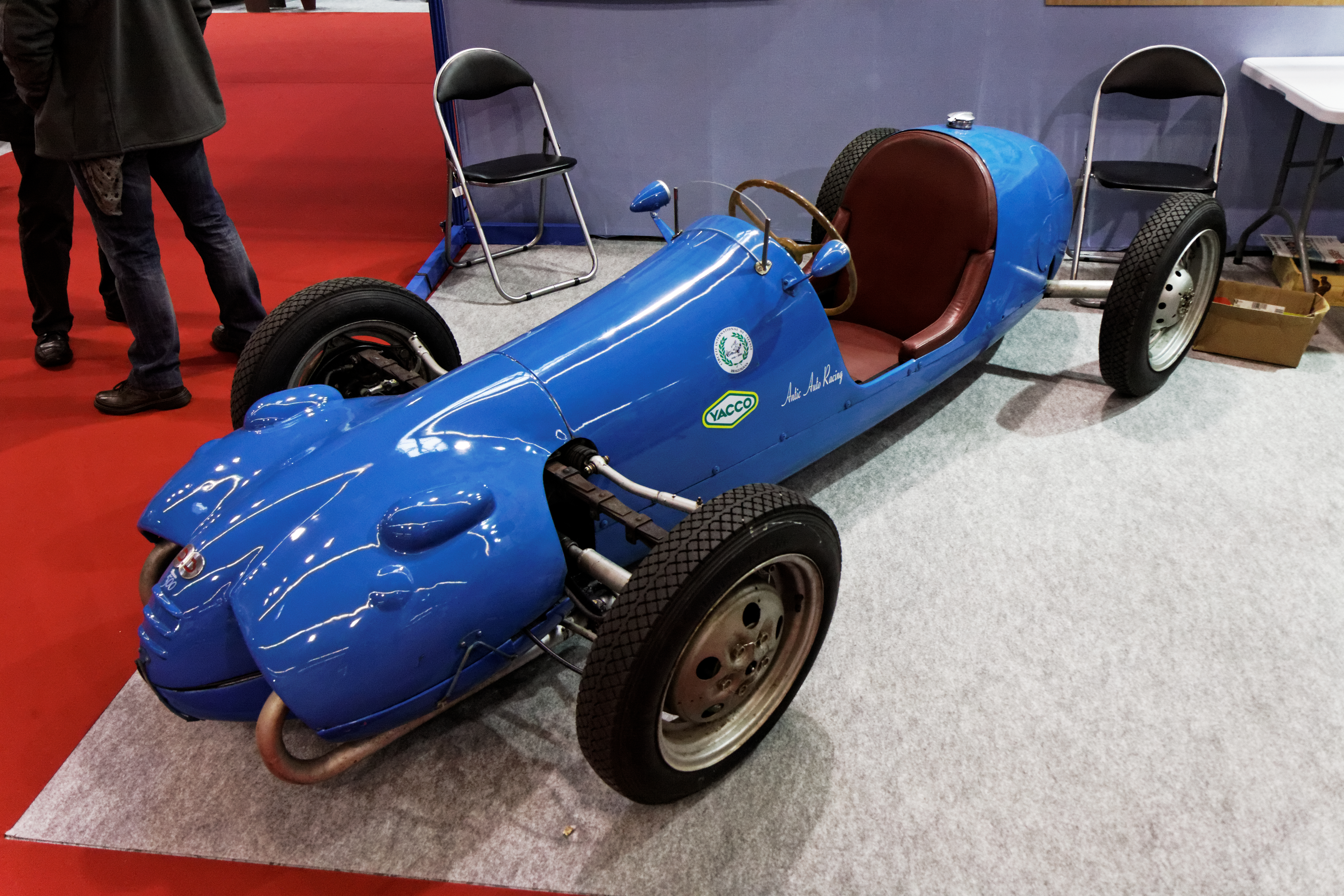
1950 DB Racer 500

Neither single-seater DB was at all successful, but they did show Deutsch - who had hitherto preferred dependable standard units - that a tuned engine would become necessary. DB thus moved into the performance parts market, developing and offering a four-speed conversion for Citroëns and an overhead camshaft head - developed with the aid of engine specialists Maurice Sainturat and Dante Giacosa. The DB8 appeared in 1948, and won two concours d'élegances before partaking in any competitions. Their early cars were all built using Citroën parts, but supply was troublesome and DB soon moved on to using Panhard technology. This relationship came about as Deutsch was an officer of independent racer's club AGACI. When this organization decided to begin a Mouvement Racer 500, modelled on the British Formula 3, Deutsch offered club members the design of a racing car using a Panhard 500 engine. One member asked to have DB build such a car, and after it made a star appearance at the 1949 Paris Salon Panhard was happy to support the construction of about fifteen more. The formula expired in 1951, with the DB Panhard 500 never competitive abroad.

DB was very active in competition, especially in Le Mans 24 Hours and other long distance racing. Nearly all DBs, even the road cars, were designed with competition foremost in mind. In 1952, a DB Speedster was entered in the 12 Hours of Sebring and won its class handsomely, beginning its career in the United States market. Steve Lansing and Ward Morehouse were the drivers.

At the 1954 Le Mans DB entered five cars and were also involved with Panhards "Monopole" racers. René Bonnet himself, together with racing legend Élie Bayol, finished tenth overall and best of the DBs. The other Panhard-engined also finished (in 16th), while three Renault-engined central-seater DB designs all failed to complete the race. The Renault-engined designs had been created as a concession to pressure from DB's customers, but they did very badly in the race, in part because of a shortage of preparation time for what was an unknown entity to Deutsch and Bonnet. In either case, DB proceeded to focus on Panhard designs exclusively.

== Road cars ==
The 1949 DB8 was bodied by Antem of Belgium and shown at the 1949 Paris Salon. While a handsome (winning two concours d'élegances) and modern design, Citroën refused to allow the provision of parts for series production. After DB began to depend on Panhard for engines, Antem was again commissioned to make a cabriolet with the intent to build a small series of street cars. 3750 mm (148 in) long, the car weighed 500 kg (1,100 lb) and used the Dyna's 750 cc flat-two and much of the suspension and drivetrain. As with most DBs, it had a central frame with two outliers. An 850 cc version was also offered, a model which could reach 140 rather than the 125–130 km/h of the smaller one. Naturally, Panhard developed a racing barquette version (called the Tank) of the Antem cabriolet. These competed at Le Mans 1951 as well as several other races. About twenty Antem cabriolets were built in 1951, but DB chose to let it die in favor of a coupé version of the same ("Coach" in French). A few DB-Antem Coach were built, mostly for competition. These had bodywork designed by Deutsch, and again mainly relied on Dyna underpinnings and a central steel-tube frame.

The steel-bodied, Frua-designed 1952 "Mille Miles" (celebrating class victories at the Mille Miglia) was a mini-GT with a 65 hp Panhard two-cylinder. It was somewhat expensive, and at the 1953 Paris Salon a Chausson-designed DB Coach in fibreglass, although it did not enter production until 1954. The HBR 4/5 model (1954–1959) was the partners' most successful project to date, with several hundred of the little cars produced between 1954 and 1959. This was followed by the Le Mans convertible and hardtop, which was shown in 1959 and built by DB until 1962, and continued until 1964 by René Bonnet. About 660 of the Mille Miles/Coach/HBR were built, and 232 DB Le Mans (not including the Bonnet-built cars). Later versions could be equipped with engines of 1 and 1.3 litres, and superchargers were also available. No two cars may have been alike, as they were built according to customer specifications from a wide range of options.

== More racing success ==
Deutsch's very efficient and influential aerodynamic designs allowed DB race cars to reach impressive top speeds despite the small Panhard flat-twin engine. DB's received class victories at Le Mans (three times), Sebring (twice), and Mille Miglia (four times). DB even managed an outright win in the handicapped 1954 Tourist Trophy sports car race, with Laureau and Armagnac driving. DB always showed strongly in the "Index of Performance", a category especially suitable for DB's small-engined, aerodynamic little racers. The Index of Performance is perhaps best known at the Le Mans 24 hours competition, but the category also existed at many French automobile races of the era, such as the Tour de France. DBs were also successful in American SCCA racing, where they racked up an impressive number of victories in the H-sports category.

== Disagreement and the end of the partnership ==
Deutsch and Bonnet disagreed whether they should build cars of front-wheel drive or mid-engined design. There was also disagreement on which engines to use. Charles Deutsch, wanting to stick to Panhard engines, left DB in 1961 to found his own firm (CD). Bonnet founded Automobiles René Bonnet, producing mid-engined cars equipped with Renault power units: this business was later to become part of Matra Automobiles. Deutsch ended up an engineering consultant.

== Works cited ==
- Borgeson, Griffith (1980). "D.B. stands for Deutsch-Bonnet". Automobile Quarterly. XVIII (1, first quarter 1980). Princeton, NJ: 54–71. ISSN 0005-1438.
