= JETT customer experience =

- Type: Private
- Industry: Customer experience consulting
- Founded: Shanghai, People's Republic of China (2004)
- Founder: Justin Barrow, Ed Dean & Toby Collins
- Headquarters: Shanghai, People's Republic of China
- Key people: Ed Dean, Connie Kuo
- Services: Customer service training, mystery shopping, consulting
- Number of employees: 40
- Website: www.jett-asia.com

JETT customer experience is a customer experience consultancy providing research, consulting and training to service businesses in China and Hong Kong. Established in Shanghai, JETT is a Wholly Foreign Owned Enterprise (WFOE) registered in China and is a subsidiary of JETT Asia Ltd. registered in Hong Kong. JETT’s products include customer experience consulting, mystery shopping, customer service training, teambuilding and customer engagement research.

The company was founded in 2004 to provide the opportunity for employees in China's service industry to learn and gain skills to help them in their daily working lives. China's strength as a manufacturer has left its service industry underdeveloped by comparison and the Beijing government is focused on growth in the standards and importance of this industry sector. Additionally, many individuals and graduates in China lack the practical experience and skills required for a service industry career, and are often particularly appreciative of the opportunity to learn through training.

== History ==
JETT was founded by Justin Barrow, Ed Dean and Toby Collins. The idea for the business came in 2003 when Barrow and Dean witnessed a local Chinese waitress in a Shanghai restaurant struggling to serve a foreign customer as she did not have the skills she needed.

Initially focused on the F&B and hospitality sectors, since 2006 the company has increasingly worked with customers from other sectors including retail, retail banking and property management. While the company’s customers were principally foreign companies at launch, over time the client-base has become more local with increased interest from mainland Chinese businesses. JETT was originally called JETT Training, but the company rebranded in 2008 to become JETT customer experience in recognition of the wider variety of services requested by customers. In the same year the company expanded to open the Beijing office in the run-up to the 2008 Beijing Olympics.

During 2010, Connie Kuo replaced Ed Dean as Managing Director. Ed Dean continues in the role of Director of Client Services focusing on client satisfaction, business development and marketing.

JETT is now Minerva and Co.

== Company Services, Products & Brands ==
In addition to consulting on a case by case basis, company services are divided into one of three categories:

- Research
- Consulting
- Training

=== Research ===
The following products and services are grouped under ‘Research’:

- Mystery shopping programmes
- Customer engagement research
- Customer research & surveys

JETT is a registered member of the Mystery Shopping Providers Association (MSPA).

=== Consulting ===
The following products and services are grouped under "consulting":

- Customer experience design
- Induction & orientation
- Incentivisation & rewards programmes
- Standards & SOP development
- Teambuilding

=== Training ===
The following products and services are grouped under "training":

- Service, sales and soft skills training
- Leadership and management training
- Job-specific-language (English) training

== Company clients ==
Clients include Apple Inc., Calvin Klein, China Construction Bank, Converse, Trip.com Group, Disney, Domino's Pizza, Education First, Gap Inc., Hilton Hotels & Resorts, Inditex, InterContinental Hotels Group, Meters/bonwe, Pizza Express, Ritz-Carlton, Subway, Travelex, VF Corporation, and Virgin Atlantic.

== See also ==
- Customer experience
- Customer engagement
- Customer service training
- Market research
- Mystery shopping
- Service industry
- Economy of China
