= Customer service training =

Training program for fresher employees

Customer service training (CST) refers to teaching employees the knowledge, skills, and competencies required to increase customer satisfaction.

== Audience ==
Any employee who interacts with a customer is a candidate for customer service training. In addition to customer service representatives, this includes other positions such as receptionists, technical support representatives, field service technicians, sales engineers, shopkeepers, waiters, etc.

== Content ==
Course content typically includes greeting the customer (either by phone or in person), questioning to understand the customer’s need or problem, listening, confirming understanding, responding with value, using positive language, eliminating jargon, concluding the phone or face-to-face interaction, dealing with angry customers, and the importance of body language and tone of voice.

== Methodology ==
Customer service classes can be taught in a traditional classroom setting with workbooks or DVD and a trainer, through various methods of e-learning (web based training), or a blend (blended learning) of the two.

An advantage of classroom training, whether traditional or the synchronous form of blended learning, is that participants can discuss best-practices with each other and build a solid team foundation. Drawbacks include work-force management when scheduling a large number of people off the job at one time, and the cost of travel if participants need to travel to the training location.

A main advantage of e-learning is that participants can be scheduled for training in a staggered fashion to allow for job coverage. Participants can work at their own pace and take whatever time is needed in order to develop a thorough understanding of the content. One drawback of e-learning is that without management oversight there may not be a satisfactory completion rate.

== Benefits ==
Listed below are several benefits that accrue to an organization when employees are trained in customer service skills:

Employees who are properly trained and demonstrate professional customer service skills, can improve customer satisfaction and loyalty. This helps the business retain customers and improve profits. It costs less to retain loyal customers than to acquire new ones. In addition, satisfied customers are more open to additional sales messages and are likely to refer others to that business.

Good listening skills and questioning techniques can shorten the interaction time with customers. This allows an organization to serve more customers in less time, possibly with fewer staff. However, consumers are intelligent and do not want to feel rushed, when they have questions. So be proactive and make sure every consumer feels they are being heard and not just "listened" to.

Being able to clearly explain the next step in a process and confirming that the customer is satisfied, will decrease the number of callbacks and return customers. Improving "first contact" resolution is one of the primary drivers of customer satisfaction.

Training all employees using consistent customer service skills, allows them to have a common process and language when assisting customers. This allows the business to brand their interaction of excellent service to the customer, which adds value to the business.

Investing in employee training gives employees a feeling of value and improves morale. In addition, when employees feel valued, they value their customers. This could be a result of effective customer service skills training, which not only benefits the employee, but will enhance the relationships with the customers. These important factors can help to increase employee loyalty, reduce employee turnover, and lower productivity costs.
