= Automobiles René Bonnet =

Automobile manufacturer

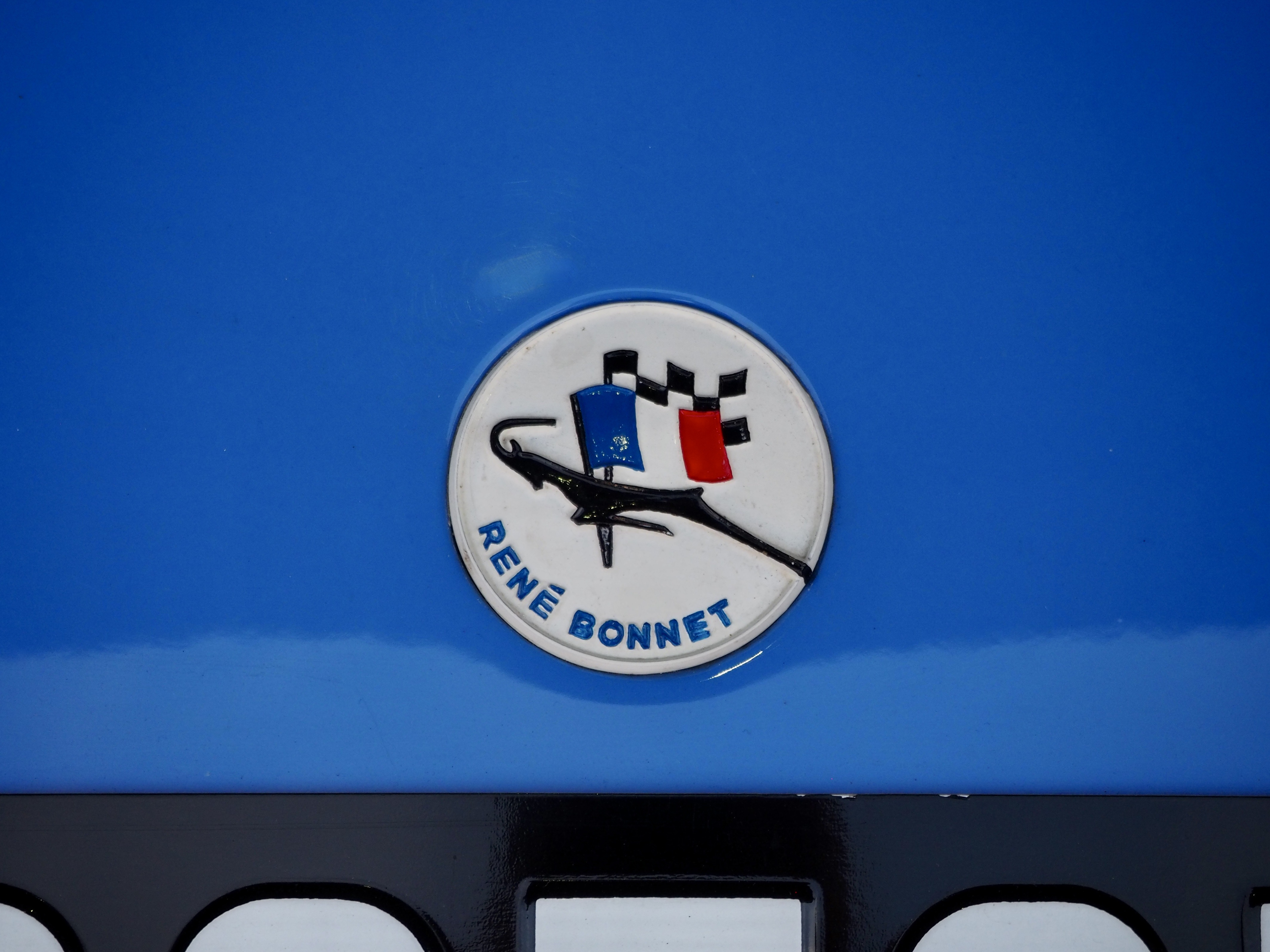
- René Bonnet car badge
- Founded: 1961 in Champigny-sur-Marne, France
- Founder: René Bonnet
- Defunct: 1964
- Successor: Matra automobiles

Automobiles René Bonnet was a French automobile maker.

The firm was the continuation of Deutsch et Bonnet (DB) by René Bonnet when Charles Deutsch, the "D" in DB, founded his own firm CD. The business was based at Champigny-sur-Marne to the south-east of central Paris.

== History ==
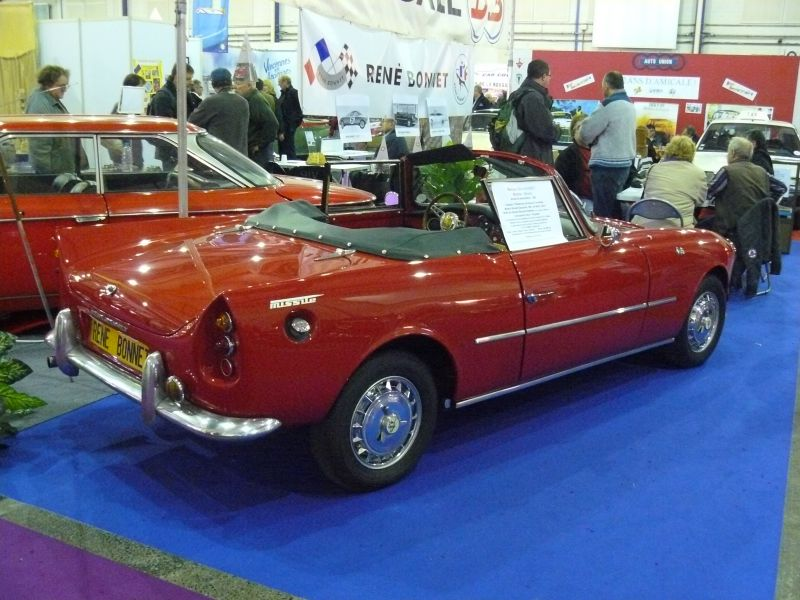
Rear view of Missile

A principal cause of the breach had involved the determination of Deutsch to stay loyal to Panhard engines while Bonnet was keen to switch to Renault power plants. The DB Le Mans, a 2+2 convertible, continued in production as the René Bonnet Le Mans, still on a front-wheel drive Panhard-based chassis albeit now equipped with Renault engines. Renault's 1,108 cc inline-four engine was also used for the Missile, a strict two-seater convertible based on the Le Mans but with a re-worked front end, and for the mid-engined Djet.

The company produced light front-wheel drive and mid-engined sports cars with very aerodynamic fiberglass bodies mainly powered by enhanced Renault engines. Its cars participated in the Le Mans 24 Hours race in 1962, 1963, and 1964. Management concentration on racing activity may nevertheless have come at the expense of commercial focus, and relatively few cars were sold during this period: by 1964 the cash was running out.

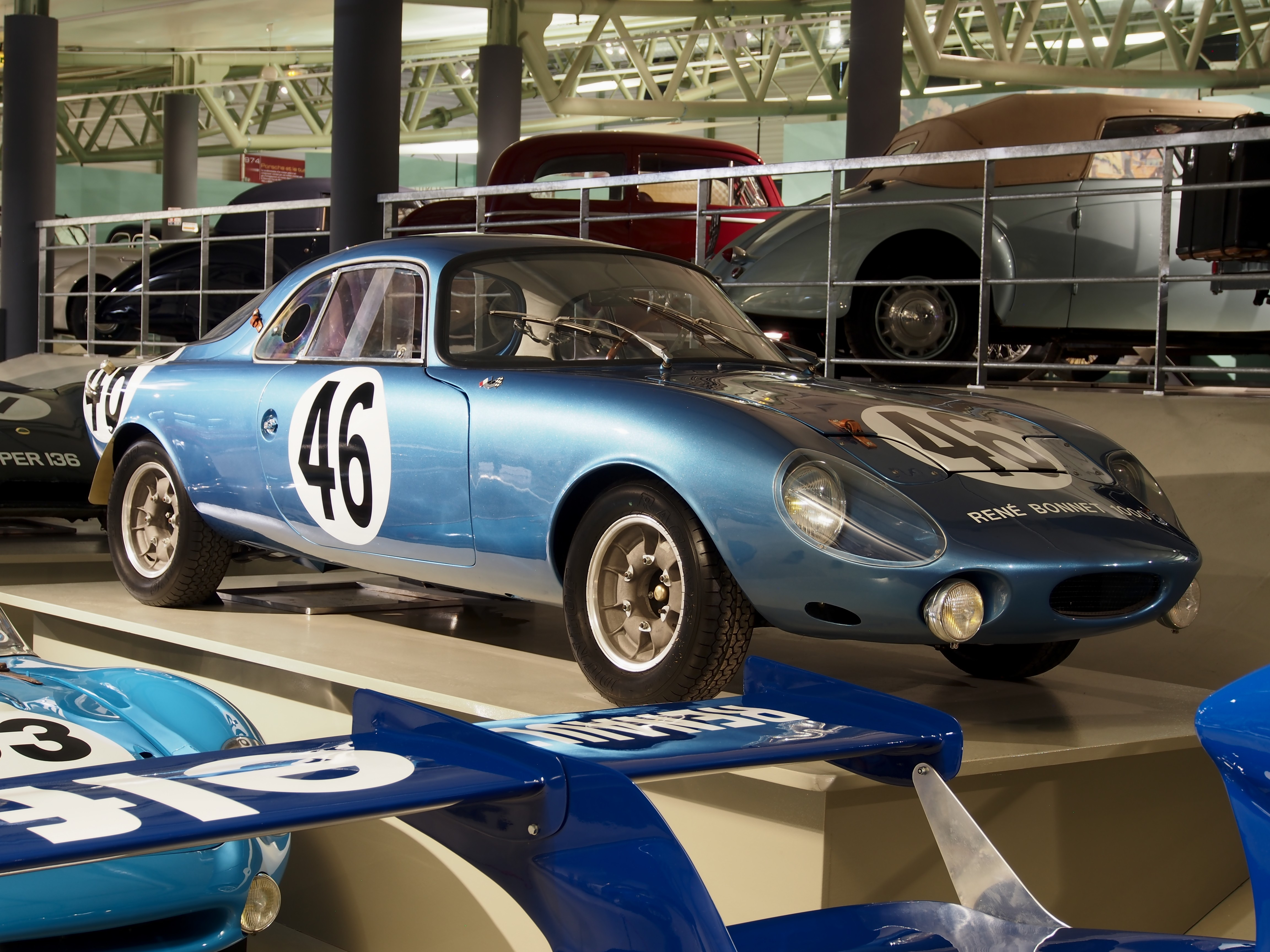
1962 René Bonnet Djet

In 1962 the René Bonnet company launched its Djet model, generally remembered in retrospect as a Matra, although 198 Bonnet Djets were sold between 1962 and 1964 (179 of these were to the lowest powered "Djet I" specifications with 65 PS). A further 1,491 would be sold as Matra Djets between 1965 and 1968. The cars usually featured Renault's four-cylinder 1,108 cc engine, but some competition versions received a considerably more powerful smaller twin-cam, 996 cc unit. The earlier DB-based Missile and Le Mans were not brought back into production after the Matra takeover.

The firm worked increasingly closely with its principal investor Matra. Matra was at the time an armaments manufacturer concentrating on missiles, but they were also enthusiastic about the future of the fibreglass technology in which Bonnet was a pioneer. An important role in bringing Bonnet's business and Matra together was also contributed by an energetic former fighter pilot and national politician called André Moynet whose involvement with the enterprise appears to have outlasted Bonnet's own. Matra's rapidly evolving partnership with René Bonnet's auto-making business was the beginning of the subsequently better known Matra Automobile division, formally inaugurated in October 1964. After this Bonnet himself appears to have had little further significant involvement in the business that for two and a half years had carried his name.

== Cars ==
- René Bonnet Le Mans: 1962–1964
- René Bonnet Missile: 1962–1964
- René Bonnet Djet: 1962–1964 (and subsequently produced as Matra-Bonnet Djet/Matra Jet until 1967)
- René Bonnet Aérojet: 1964–1965 (competition car, only nine built)
