= René Bonnet (businessman) =

French engineer and businessman (1904–1983)

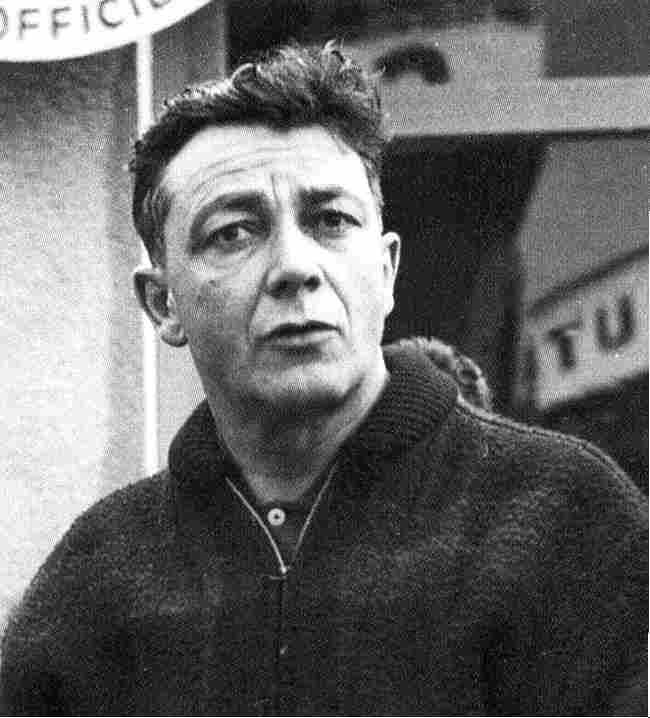
- Born: 27 December 1904; Vaumas
- Died: 13 January 1983 (aged 78)
- Resting place: Champigny-sur-Marne

René Bonnet (27 December 1904 – 13 January 1983) was a French engineer and businessman who co-founded the automobile manufacturing brand DB Deutsch-Bonnet in 1937, before founding his own brand, Automobiles René Bonnet, in 1961.

== Early life ==
The young René first learned about machines working with his father, a carpenter. By 1915, with most teachers conscripted, René left school and started work, first as a farmhand and later in factories, eventually making his way to Paris. Bonnet was a capable athlete, playing right winger for the local Dompierre-sur-Besbre football team.

In 1925 he joined the Navy "to see the oceans", where a sadistic officer made him dive into a shallow pool, causing him a back injury which was to trouble him for the rest of his life. Diagnosed with tuberculosis of the bones, he spent some time in sanatoriums, where he learned how to make shawls. By 1929 he was back in his hometown of Vaumas, eking out a meagre living at this trade. His life really began to change soon thereafter when his sister asked René to come assist her in running the small garage which had become her responsibility after her husband's recent death. The garage was also a Rosengart dealer, although they had not yet managed to sell a single car when René took over. He proved an adept salesman and soon also became a Citroën dealer, a much more profitable agency. In October 1932, he bought a small coachworker called "La Maison Deutsch" from the founder's widow. The founder's 21-year-old son, Charles Deutsch continued to work for Bonnet and the two were to develop a long and fruitful collaboration.

== Building cars ==
He started building race cars in 1936 with Charles Deutsch and in 1946 they founded Deutsch et Bonnet in Champigny-sur-Marne, using Citroën and Panhard mechanics. They separated in 1961 and René Bonnet founded the firm Automobiles René Bonnet in Romorantin with the aid of his longtime sponsor BP. Bonnet created the world's first road-legal mid-engined sports car, powered by Renault mechanics: the René Bonnet Djet. The Djet had a significant racing career at Sebring, Le Mans, the Nürburgring (in 1962, a Djet finished 20th and 1st in its class) and in many rallies including the Tour de France Automobile.

There was also a convertible called the "Missile", which sported tailfins. The company's products, however, were a commercial failure in spite of their spirited performance, with only 198 examples having been built between 1962 and 1964. As a result of this, Automobiles René Bonnet came into financial trouble and he was forced to sell the company to its supplier Matra in October 1964. Bonnet never returned to the automobile industry afterwards, but the Djet and Missiles remained in production by Matra.

René Bonnet died in an automobile accident on 13 January 1983, aged 78. He is buried in Champigny-sur-Marne.
