= Matra Djet =

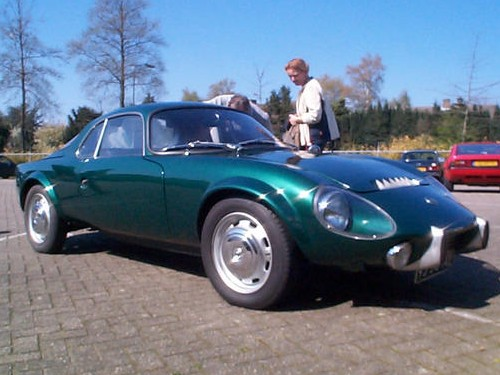

Overview
- Manufacturer: Automobiles René Bonnet; Matra Automobiles
- Also called: René Bonnet Djet; Matra-Bonnet Djet; Matra Sports Djet; Matra Sports Jet
- Production: 1962–1964 (René Bonnet); 1965–1967 (Matra)
- Assembly: France: Romorantin-Lanthenay
- Designer: René Bonnet, Jacques Hubert (original design); Philippe Guédon (redesign)

Body and chassis
- Class: Sports car
- Body style: 2-door berlinette
- Layout: MR layout
- Related: Renault 8 (engine), Renault Estafette (gearbox)

Powertrain
- Engine: 996 cc Cléon-Fonte Gordini DOHC I4; 1,108 cc Cléon-Fonte OHV I4; 1,255 cc Cléon-Fonte Gordini OHV I4
- Transmission: 4-speed manual

Dimensions
- Wheelbase: 2,400 mm (94.5 in)
- Length: 4,220 mm (166.1 in)
- Width: 1,500 mm (59.1 in)
- Height: 1,200 mm (47.2 in)
- Curb weight: 660 kg (1,455 lb)

Chronology
- Successor: Matra 530

The Djet is a French sports car designed and sold by René Bonnet (1962–1964) and then Matra (1965–1967). It was the world's first rear mid-engined production road car. Different versions were sold under a variety of names, including René Bonnet Djet, Matra-Bonnet Djet, Matra Sports Djet, and finally Matra Sports Jet.

== Djet ==
The car started out as the René Bonnet Djet in June 1962. This model became known in retrospect as the Djet I. Bonnet named it "Djet" as he wanted it to be pronounced by French speakers more like the English word "jet" instead of the French word "jet". The name is often styled "D'jet" or "D'Jet". It was powered by a 65 PS (48 kW) 1,108 cc engine from a Renault 8 in a mid-engine location mated to a gearbox from the Renault Estafette van. This power-train gave the car a top speed of 165 km/h (103 mph), or 190 km/h (118 mph) in the later Djet III with a Gordini engine. A fiberglass body was chosen for its lightness, ease of repairs, and to keep initial investment costs low. The body was made by Matra's Générale d'Applications Plastiques subsidiary in Romorantin, and was bonded directly to a steel chassis. The chassis were built in Bonnet's factory in Champigny-sur-Marne (a Paris suburb), where final assembly also took place.

As part of Bonnet's contract with Renault, the Djet was developed to be able to compete in several different classes, but in the end only 1,000 and 1,100 cc models were made. The competition Aérodjet of 1963 (pictured in the gallery) came with special long-tailed bodywork and bigger fenders to accommodate wider wheels. Multiple Aérodjets were entered by Automobiles René Bonnet at the 1964 24 Hours of Le Mans.

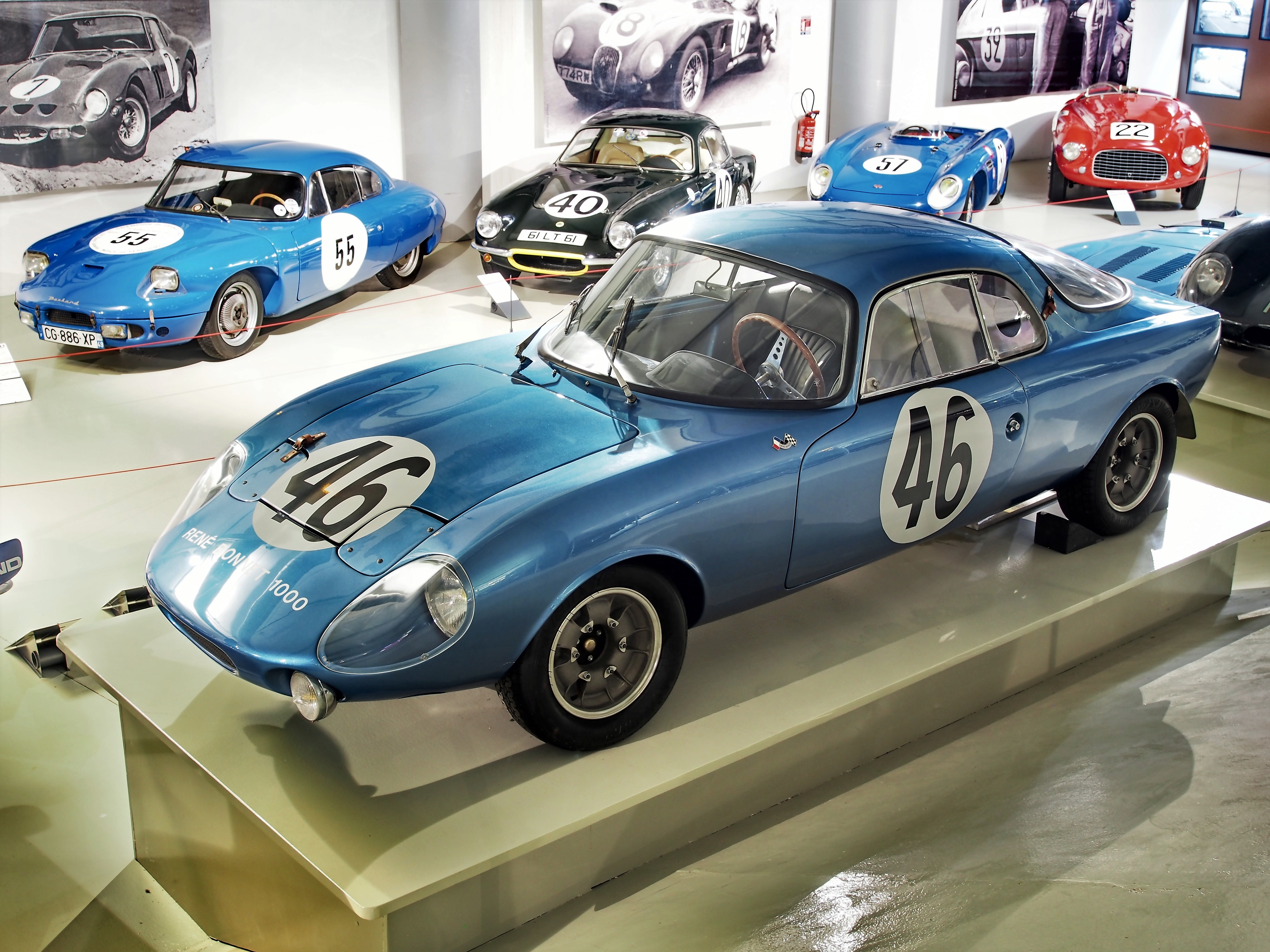
René Bonnet Djet 1000 (Djet III)

The Djet's suspension was quite advanced for the time, being a fully independent system having upper and lower A-arms with coil springs and disc brakes at all four wheels. The car accommodated just two people, as the engine took the space where a rear seat would otherwise be. The Djet I was 3,800 mm (149.6 in) long by 1,400 mm (55.1 in) wide by 1,150 mm (45.3 in) high and weighed only 600 kg (1,323 lb). Announced in 1962, the Bonnet Djet was the world's first mid-engined production road car, beating the De Tomaso Vallelunga which was introduced in 1963, even though the first production Djets did not leave the factory until July 1963. During the two years before Matra took over, 198 Bonnet Djets were produced, with all but 19 being built to the lower-powered Djet I specification. After becoming the Matra Djet in 1964 a further 1,491 cars were produced before production ended in 1968. Fewer than 60 Vallelungas were built before De Tomaso replaced it with the Mangusta in 1967.

The Djet was priced at 20,000 French francs at launch, the same as its much larger and more luxurious contemporary, the Facel-Vega Facellia. The Bonnet did not impress with its level of finish, and the uninsulated fibreglass bodywork made for an extremely noisy environment inside. Bonnet believed that the competition record of the Djet and his company would be enough to convince the public to purchase it, but this was not to be the case.

== Matra takes control ==
When Bonnet got into financial troubles, Matra, who already supplied both the bodyshells and the factory for the Djet, took over René Bonnet Automobiles and its debts in October 1964. Production of the original Djet was stopped in December 1964. Matra's President Marcel Chassagny considered this a great opportunity for Matra to expand into the automobile market. Chassagny hired Jean-Luc Lagardère away from aeronautics competitors Avions Marcel Dassault to run the newly formed Matra Sports and Engins Matra divisions. Former Simca designer Philippe Guédon was hired to modify the original Bonnet Djet. The car became slightly bigger, measuring 4,220 mm (166.1 in) long by 1,500 mm (59.1 in) wide by 1,200 mm (47.2 in) high and weighing 660 kg (1,455 lb). Production resumed in April 1965 with two new versions; the Matra-Bonnet Djet V and the Djet V S, the latter having a Gordini-tuned engine.

During his 1965 tour of France, Yuri Gagarin was presented with a Matra-Bonnet Djet V S coupé by the French government. The car was later photographed wearing Soviet license plates. Production was gradually moved away from the old Bonnet plant, and late Jets were built entirely at Matra's home plant in Romorantin-Lanthenay.

After the Paris Motor Show in 1965, the Roman numerals and the Bonnet name were dropped. The car was now called the Matra Sports Djet 5. In 1966, a version with a bigger Gordini engine became available and the Djet name was dropped in favour of its original meaning: Jet. The model range now consisted of the Jet 5 (1,108 cc Renault 8 Major engine), Jet 5 S (1,108 cc Renault 8 Gordini engine) and Jet 6 (1,255 cc Renault Gordini engine).

== Model range ==
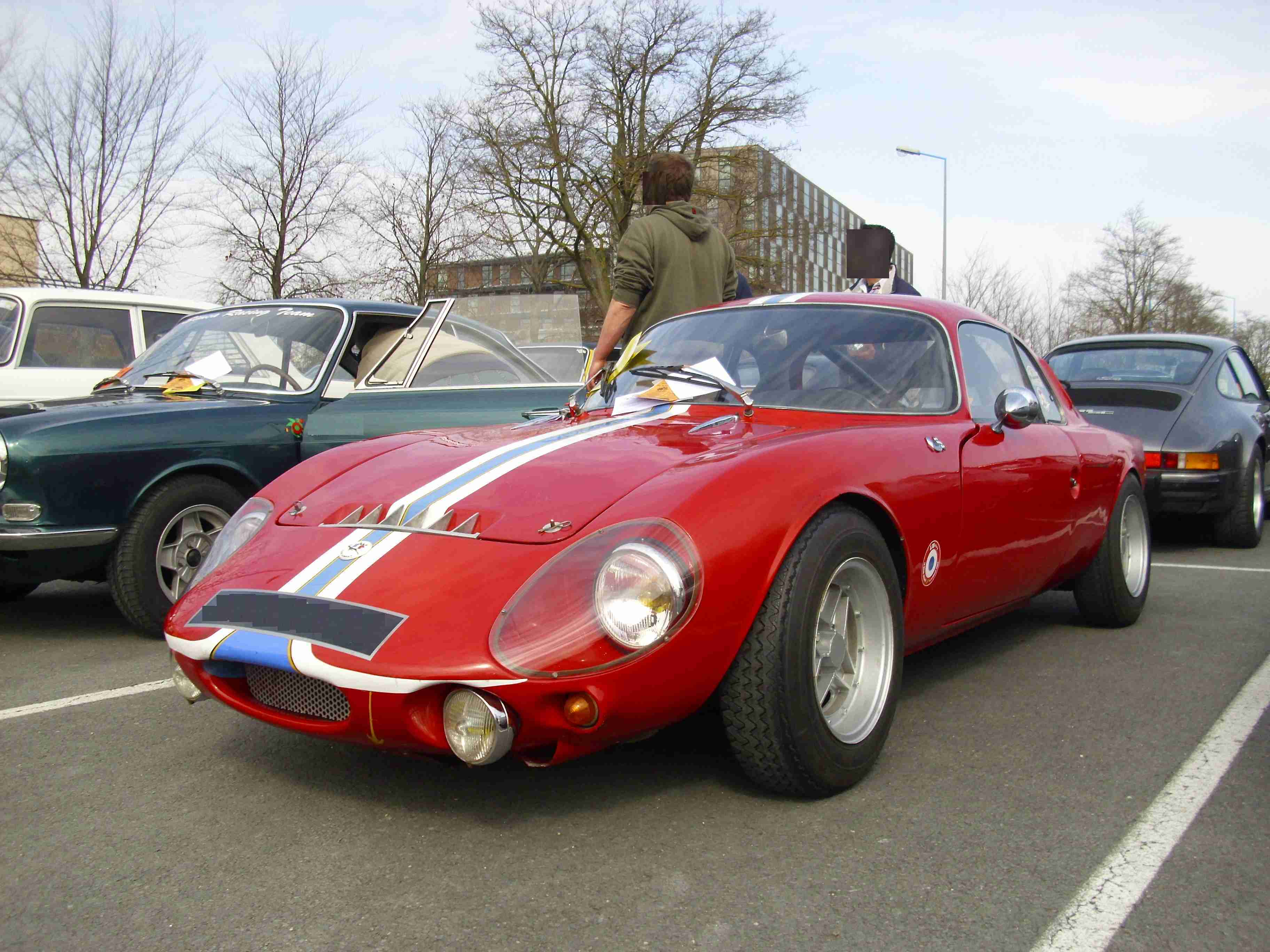
René Bonnet Djet

=== René Bonnet Djet ===
There were four types of René Bonnet Djet:

René Bonnet Djet I
1,108 cc Renault 8 Major engine (72 PS), 165 km/h (103 mph)
René Bonnet Djet II
1,108 cc Renault 8 Gordini engine (80 PS), 190 km/h (118 mph)
René Bonnet Djet III / Djet IV
996 cc engine with double overhead camshafts (80 or 100 PS). These models were developed for competition use.

Only 198 René Bonnet Djets were built between 1962 and 1964, 179 of which were of the lesser Djet I model.

=== Matra-Bonnet Djet / Matra Sports Djet / Matra Sports Jet ===
Three types of Matra-Bonnet/Matra Sports Djet/Jet were produced from 1965 until 1967:

Matra-Bonnet Djet V / Matra Sports Djet 5 / Jet 5
1,108 cc Renault 8 Major engine, 70 PS (51 kW), 170 km/h (106 mph)
Matra-Bonnet Djet V S / Matra Sports Djet 5 S / Jet 5 S
1,108 cc Renault 8 Gordini engine, 90 PS (66 kW), 190 km/h (118 mph)
Matra Sports Jet 6
1,255 cc Renault 8 Gordini engine, 105 PS (77 kW), 210 km/h (130 mph).

Apart from these model designations, a luxury version with wooden dashboard and bigger bumper was available.

Production of the Jet ended in 1967 with a total of 1,495 Matra (D)Jets and it was replaced with the Matra 530. The last Jets (all Jet 6s) were sold in 1968.

=== Specifications ===
Matra Djet
Model	Engine	Displacement	Maximum horsepower	Maximum torque	Dry weight	Top speed	Years produced	Price at introduction	Number produced
Djet I (C.B.R 1)	C1E	1,108 cc (67.6 cu in)	72 PS (53 kW; 71 hp) at 5,800	84 N⋅m (62.0 lb⋅ft) at 4,800	610 kg (1,344.8 lb)	170 km/h (105.6 mph)	1962-1964	18,000 FF	159
Djet I (C.B.R 2)	C1E	1,108 cc (67.6 cu in)	80 PS (59 kW; 79 hp) at 6,500	84 N⋅m (62.0 lb⋅ft) at 4,800	610 kg (1,344.8 lb)	175 km/h (108.7 mph)	1962-1964	25,000 FF	159
Djet II	Renault	996 cc (60.8 cu in)	85 PS (63 kW; 84 hp) at 6,500	84 N⋅m (62.0 lb⋅ft) at 4,800	610 kg (1,344.8 lb)	180 km/h (111.8 mph)	1963-64	21,000 FF	34
Djet III^{2}	Renault	996 cc (60.8 cu in); 1,108 cc (67.6 cu in)	80 PS (59 kW; 79 hp) at 6,500 rpm 100 PS (74 kW; 99 hp) at 6,500 rpm	-	610 kg (1,344.8 lb)	175 km/h (108.7 mph); 200 km/h (124.3 mph)	1963-64	25,000 FF	16^{1}
Djet IV^{2}	Renault	996 cc (60.8 cu in); 1,108 cc (67.6 cu in)	80 PS (59 kW; 79 hp) at 6,500 rpm 100 PS (74 kW; 99 hp) at 6,500 rpm	-	610 kg (1,344.8 lb)	175 km/h (108.7 mph); 200 km/h (124.3 mph)	1963-64	30,000 FF	16^{1}
Aérodjet^{2}	Renault	996 cc (60.8 cu in); 1,108 cc (67.6 cu in)	65 PS (48 kW; 64 hp) at 6,000	-	-	155 km/h (96.3 mph)	1963	20,000 FF	5
Djet V^{3}	C1E	1,108 cc (67.6 cu in)	70 PS (51 kW; 69 hp) at 6,000	84 N⋅m (62.0 lb⋅ft) at 4,800	615 kg (1,355.8 lb)	175 km/h (108.7 mph)	1964-1968	19,800 FF	916
Djet V S^{3}	C1E	1,108 cc (67.6 cu in)	95 PS (70 kW; 94 hp) at 6,500	98 N⋅m (72.3 lb⋅ft) at 4,000	660 kg (1,455.1 lb)	187 km/h (116.2 mph); 200 km/h (124.3 mph)	1964-1967	23,000 FF	355
Jet 6	Type 812	1,255 cc (76.6 cu in)	103 PS (76 kW; 102 hp) at 6,750	98 N⋅m (72.3 lb⋅ft) at 4,000	740 kg (1,631.4 lb)	200 km/h (124.3 mph)	1966-1968	23,800 FF	222
Note:^{1}Calculated number based on difference between sources which include the Djet III and Djet IV in total units produced until 1964 and others which exclude these models.^{2}Competition models^{3}In 1965 the name changed from Djet V to Djet 5, and in 1966 it changed again, dropping the D to become the Jet 5. This also applied to the Djet VS

== Gallery ==
Djets, Jets and Aérodjets

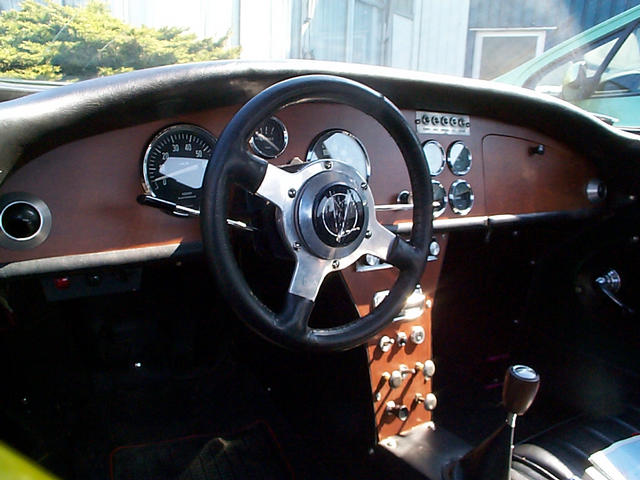
Matra Bonnet Djet dashboard

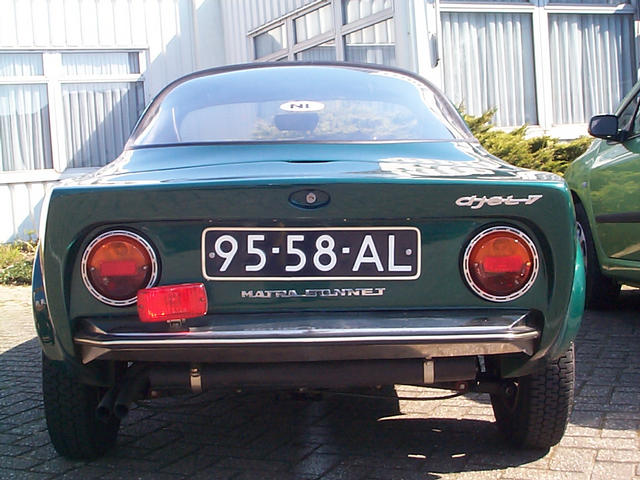
Matra Bonnet Djet V rear

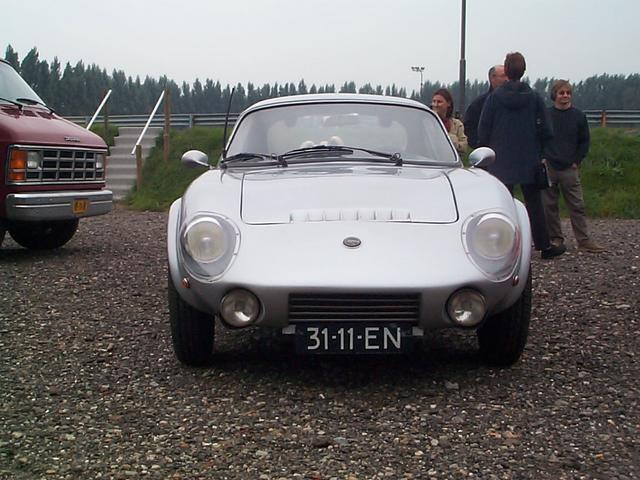
Matra Sports Jet 6 front

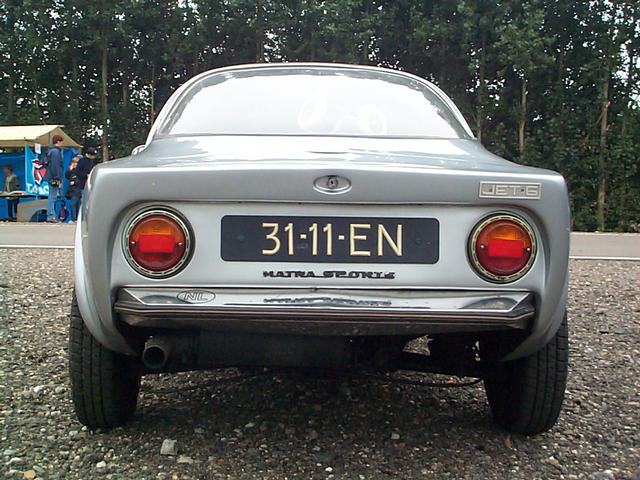
Matra Sports Jet 6 rear

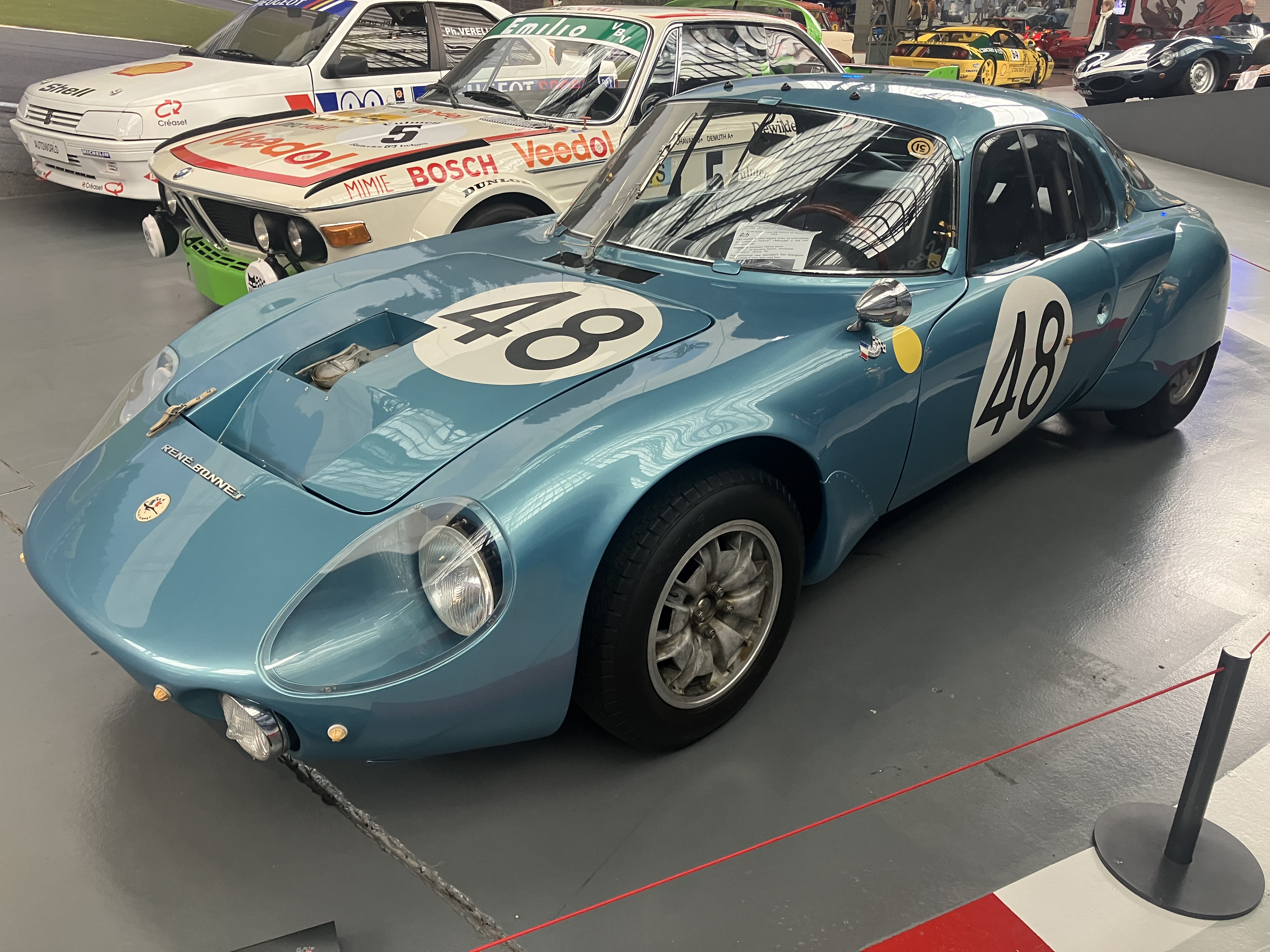
Aérodjet front

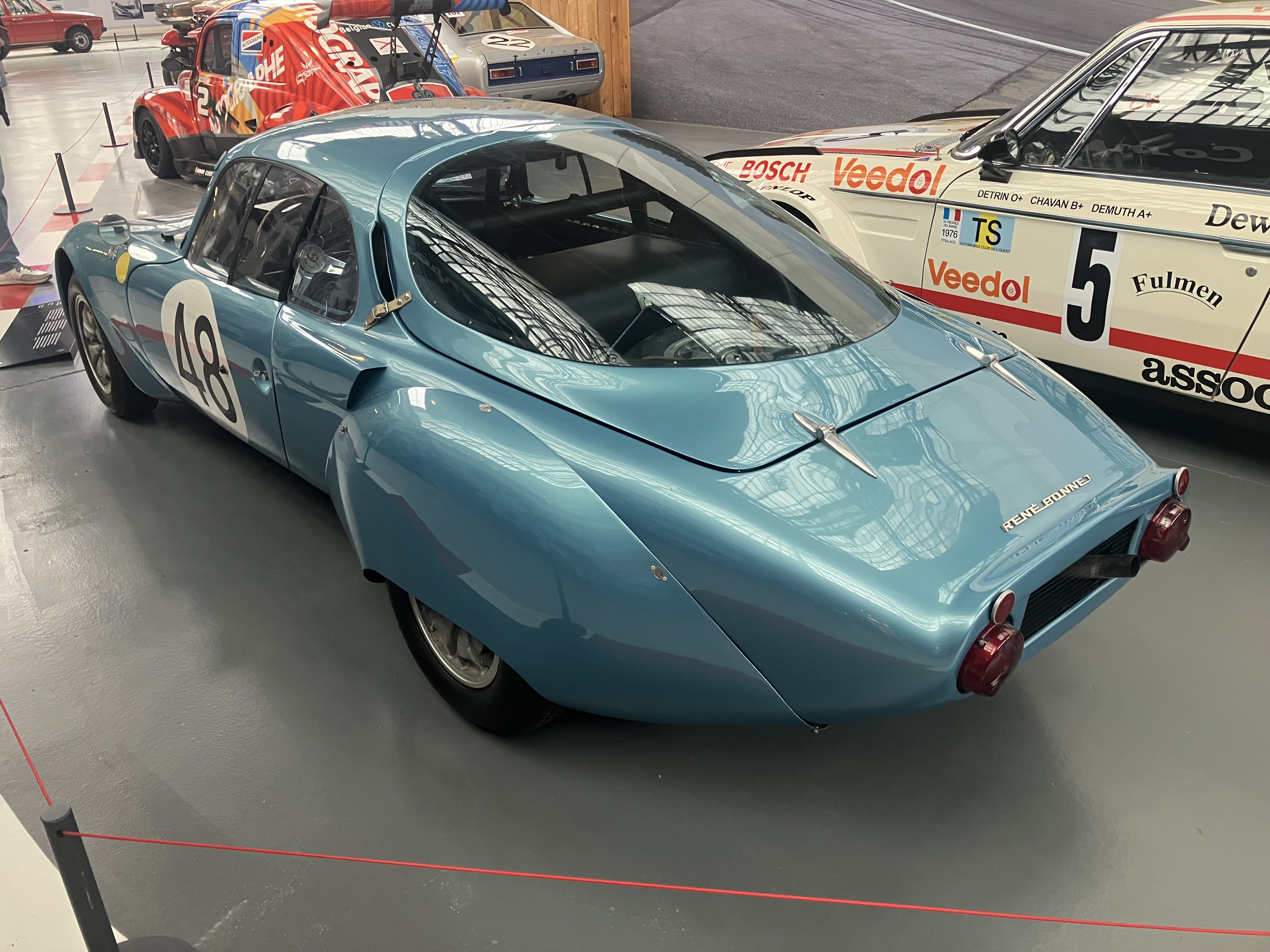
Aérodjet rear

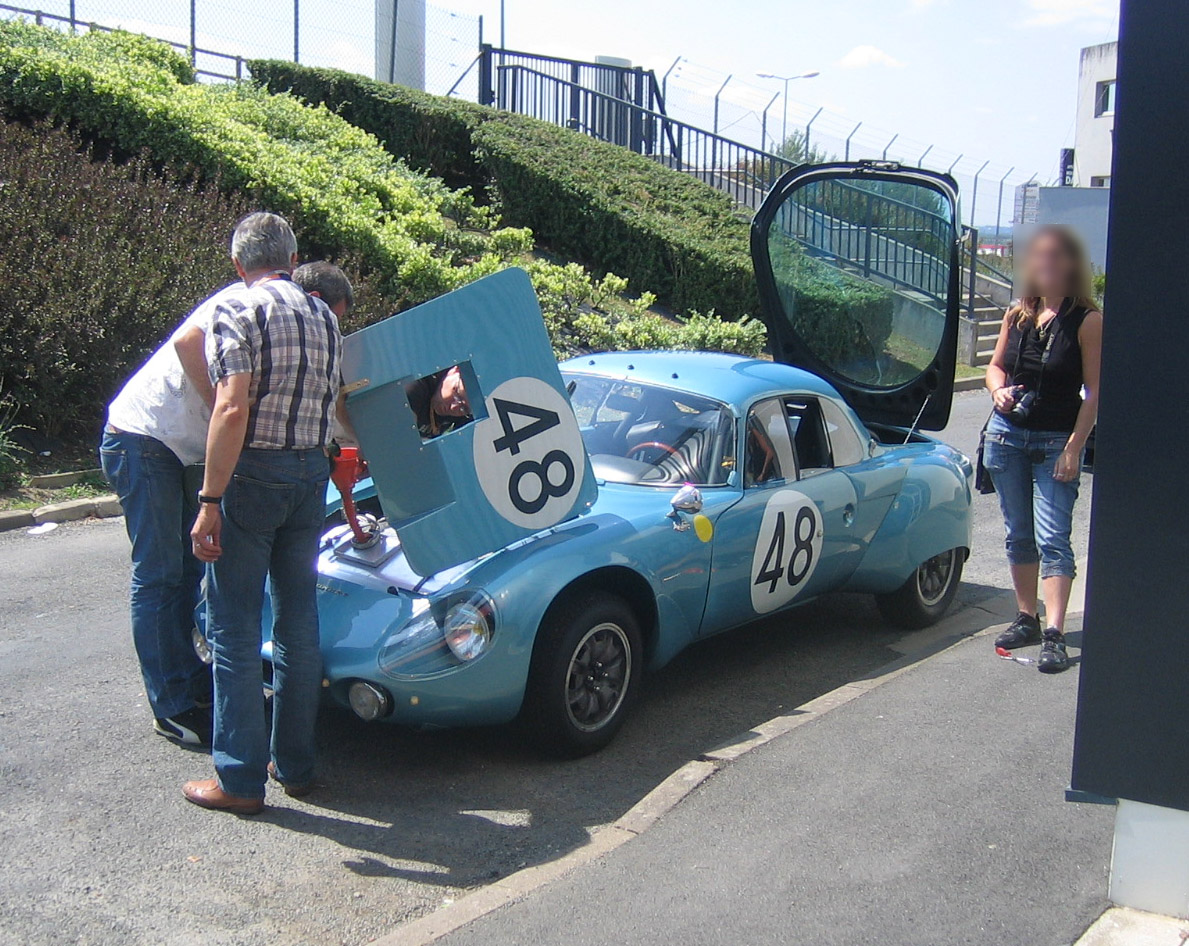
René Bonnet Aérodjet, as used for a DNF at Le Mans 1964
