= The Jets (Dutch band) =

Dutch pop group

The Jets were a Dutch pop group of the 1960s from Utrecht.

== Members ==
- Peter van Meel (vocals)
- Nico Witkamp (vocals, bass)
- Barry van der Berg (guitar)
- Leen van der Werf (rhythm guitar)
- Eddy Geurtsen (keyboardist, vocals)
- Boy Brotowksi (drums)
- Karry Mulder (bass, died 2000)
- Tonny Mulder (drums)

== Discography ==
=== Singles ===
- 1964: Shake hands/Memphis, Tennessee, alleen verkrijgbaar bij botermerk Leeuwenzegel.
- 1964: Jets fly/Baby Elephant Walk
- 1965: Jets versie van Goldfinger (werd ook uitgebracht in Japan, maar dan onder artiestennaam The Goldfingers)
- 1965: Thunderball
- 1966: Do the monkey with James Bond
- 1966: I was so glad
- 1966: The pied piper
- 1966: If I could start my life again
- 1966: Please send me a letter
- 1988: Solide

=== Albums ===
- 1966: Caravan
- 1966: Goldfinger
- 1966: Santa Claus a Go Go
- 1983: The Jets Live
