= Jet Zoon =

Jet Zoon (born 1988 in Wageningen, Netherlands) is a Dutch diatonic accordionist/composer and winner of Nederlands Blazers Ensemble's jongNBE young composers competition for her piece, "Zooi op Zolder" (Mess In the Attic), which she performed in the VARA New Year's Concert in 2006 at the Concertgebouw in Amsterdam. Having discovered the diatonic accordion at age 7, Zoon studied under Judica Lookman, Roberto Tombesi, Ronan Robert, Luke Daniels, Jannick Martin and Bruno Letron at the Accademia del Mantice. Zoon currently performs alongside cellist Tessel Grijp and contrabass player Paul de Vriesband in the band Koek. Zoon has performed with Koek all across Europe, playing repertoire focused on balfolk (traditional dances) of central France, as well as music from the Balkans and Italy, including an dro, bouree, polka, mazurka, rondeau, cercle, jig, and other styles. In October 2009, Zoon and bandmates Karlijn Swart (flute) and Joris Alblas (guitar) debuted at Theater de Musketon in Utrecht as Annie en de Boswachter.
