= Jet O'Rourke =

- Genres: Indie rock, alternative rock, pop rock
- Occupations: Architect, and Musician
- Instruments: Vocals, Guitar, Bass
- Years active: 2003- Present

Jet O'Rourke is an architect and musician from Adelaide, South Australia. He started performing in Adelaide and released a solo EP, Are Ya Gettin' On? which reached #93 on the ARIA Singles Chart and featured the single 'Fight the Good Fight'.

== Solo ==
O'Rourke independently recorded the EP Are Ya Gettin' On? in 2002, at Mixmasters Studio. In 2003, Warner Music Australia and Warner Chappell Publishing signed O'Rourke as a solo artist, and released the EP featuring the single 'Fight the Good Fight' in October 2003. The song gained heavy airplay on commercial radio stations, such as Triple M, and led to O'Rourke promoting the EP extensively Australia-wide, and supporting rock acts such as The Pictures, and The Church.

== The Gear ==
O'Rourke relocated to Melbourne in 2004 where he formed The Gear with Damian Gibson and Brett Wolfenden (later replaced by Leigh Baines and James Harding). The Gear won a spot on the Coke Live 'N Local tour and released an EP in 2005. The Gear EP was produced by 5- time Aria Award winner Paul McKercher (You Am I, Little Birdy, Eskimo Joe, Augie March).

The Gear toured the United States and Canada during 2006 and 2007, most notably performing shows to audiences at Canadian Music Week (Toronto), and SXSW Austin, Texas. The band received added support and radio airplay on KROQ-FM from renowned L.A. DJ and pal Rodney Bingenheimer famed for discovering musical acts such as David Bowie, The Ramones, and Oasis.

== Architecture ==
In 2012 O'Rourke was awarded The Desmond Tan Scholarship in Architectural History for his research thesis analysing the impact of the Small Homes Service.

Following his completion of a Master of Architecture at the University of South Australia in 2013, O'Rourke was the awarded the Hodgkison Graduate Prize for excellence in the final studio of the Masters program, and the Architecture Practice Board of S.A.’s 2013 Travelling Prize in Architecture.

In October 2016, O'Rourke became a registered architect in the state of Victoria.

Having worked with Cumulus Studio since 2016 in Melbourne, in 2020 O'Rourke relocated back to his hometown of Adelaide and established an S.A. based studio for the business.

Having developed experience with modernist and mid-century homes, including the Walkley Boyd House, projects by Robert Dickson and John S. Chappel, and the Lynton Residence by Hubert van der Pennen, O'Rourke established his own practice, Jet O'Rourke Architect, as a sole practitioner in 2026, working on residential, mid-century, and heritage projects.

O'Rourke's research on architect Hubert van der Pennen was published in The Modernist magazine, Issue 56 (2026), covering van der Pennen's civic work in Adelaide's parklands.

== Shiva and the Hazards ==
In 2017 O'Rourke joined Melbourne rock group Shiva and the Hazards as a contributing songwriter and lead guitarist. Following support slots with British groups Ride and Cast on their respective Aus and NZ tours in 2019, the single 'Revolution Son' written by O'Rourke was released in October 2020. Since 2017, the bands artwork and graphics have also been designed by O'Rourke.

== Discography ==
=== Solo ===
List of EPs, with selected chart positions
Title	Details	Peak chart positions
Title	Details	AUS
Are Ya Gettin' On?	Released: 2003; Label: Warner Music Australia; Format: CD; Track listing: 1. "Fight the Good Fight" (single); 2. "Take What I Need"; 3. "What's Gonna Make You Smile?"; 4. "Are Ya Gettin' On?"; 5. "Goodnight for Good" (demo)	93

=== The Gear ===
- Electric Lane (Sampler) (2002) Independent

1. What's Gonna Make You Smile
2. Take What I Need
3. Fight The Good Fight
4. Are Ya Gettin' On?

- The Gear EP (2005) Independent

1. I've Got Trouble (Single)
2. Eight Arms To Hold You
3. Always Changin'
4. Faces At Me

=== Shiva and the Hazards ===
2018

- 1. Angkor Wat (Single)

Guitar and backing vocals by Jet O'Rourke.

2020

- 1. Revolution Son (Single)

Written by Jet O'Rourke.
