= Terri Jett =

American academic, writer, activist

Dr. Terri Jett
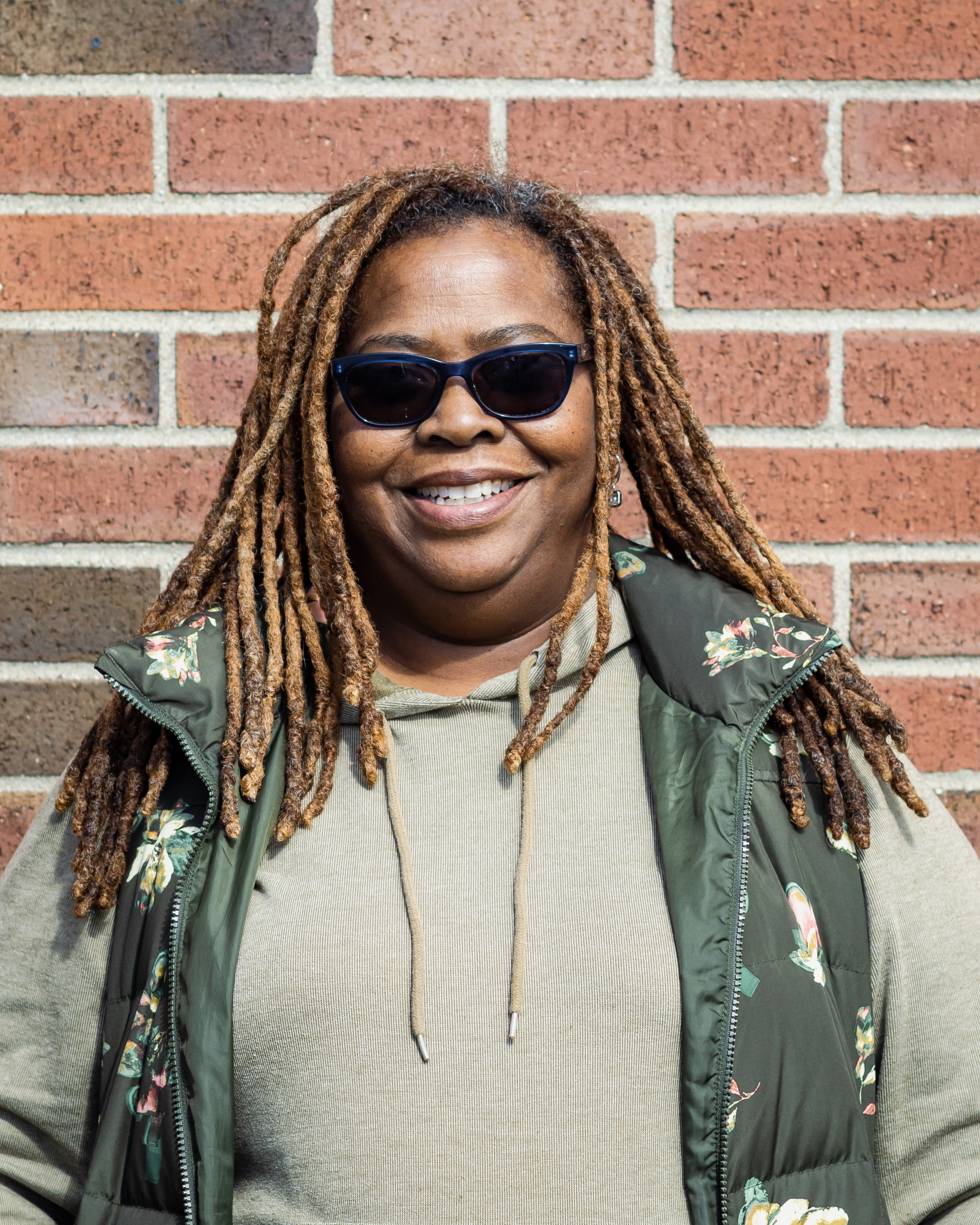
- Born: Oakland, California
- Occupations: Academic; Activist; Author

Academic background
- Education: California State University, Hayward (BS, MPA) Auburn University (Ph.D)

Academic work
- Discipline: Political Science
- Main interests: Political Science, Farming Justice

Terri Jett is a political science professor from Richmond, California. Her teaching and research are within the scope of post-Civil Rights era community and economic development as well as pedagogical practices that cultivate inclusive curricular and co-curricular spaces. She currently serves as the Associate Vice President/Senior Diversity Officer at Saint Mary's College of California.

== Early life and education ==
Jett was born at Kaiser Permanente Oakland Medical Center, in Oakland, California, but grew up in Richmond, California. She received a Bachelor of Arts in Ethnic Studies from California State University in Hayward, California. She went on to pursue her Masters in Public Administration, which she also earned from California State University. Jett earned her Ph.D. in Public Policy and Public Administration from Auburn University, in Alabama.

== Career ==
Shortly after earning her Ph.D, she began working at Butler University in 1999 as Assistant Professor of Political Science and Peace and Conflict. From 2007-2014, she was the department chair and again, in 2023, she served as the interim chair. In 2020, Jett was named full professor at Butler University, making her the first Black woman to become a full professor and earn tenure at the institution.

During her time at Butler, Jett was highly involved in the campus community and as well as the broader Indianapolis community. During her 20 years of service, she held many roles on campus which include faculty director of the Hub for Black Affairs and Community Engagement (the Hub), member of the Steering Committee of the Race, Gender, Faculty, Fellow at the Desmond Tutu Peace Lab Think Tank Sexuality Studies Program (RGSS), and faculty senator . She developed over two dozen courses that include core, departmental, and honors courses at the university. In addition, she served as the Senior Advisor to the President.

Jett was a recipient of the 2021-2022 Distinguished Faculty Award presented by Butler University.

In March 2024, Jett announced her departure from Butler after serving the campus for 24 years. On April 1, Jett stepped into her new role as Associate Vice President/Senior Diversity Officer (AVP/SDO) at Saint Mary's College of California.

Jett is the host of a digital short film series, "Simple Civics", a program on WFYI's platform which answers questions about U.S. Laws and Government.

== Community involvement and activism ==
When Jett moved from California to Indiana, she did not have connections to the community but over the course of her career, she fostered relationships with Indianapolis community organizations. She served on the board of Indiana Humanities and the Indianapolis Land Improvement Bond Bank Board, which was an appointed position by Mayor Joe Hoggsett.

In 2016, the city-council appointed Jett to the Board of Trustees of the Indianapolis Public Library (IndyPL). She served for four years as the liaison between the library and the library board foundation. She ran for President of the board in 2020, and lost the election 4-3. Controversy surrounded the election because Jett had served for four years and her opponent, Judge Jose Salinas, had only served on the board for eight months at the time of securing the win. This occurred in the midst of IndyPL facing public outcry over systemic racism and discrimination experienced by their Black employees.

Much of Jett's research surrounds agriculture and food injustice. On these subjects, she worked to establish a partnership between Butler's Hub for Black Affairs and Community Engagement (the Hub) and the Indy Women Food organization. This partnership, formed in 2022, created Indy Women In Food's first conference. The event focused on food insecurity and injustice. In 2020, Jett was elected as a member of the Indiana Humanities board for 2021-2022. That same year she was elected to the Federation of State Humanities Council Board of Directors.

== Selected works ==
- Jett, Terri R. (January 9, 2023). Fighting for Farming Justice: Diversity, Food Access and the USDA. United States of America: Routledge. ISBN 9780367682859.
- Jett, T. R., & Gentle, P. (2018). “Rollin’ on the River”: What economic and political factors caused restoration of service for the Gee’s Bend public ferry? Geopolitics under Globalization, 2(1), 45–54. DOI: 10.21511/gg.02(1).2018.06
- Moscowitz, D., Jett, T., Carney, T., Leech, T., & Savage, A. (2014). Diversity in times of austerity: Documenting resistance in the academy. Journal of Gender Studies, 23(3), 233–246. DOI: 10.1080/09589236.2014.913976.
- Jett, T. (2011). The Justice that Justice Denied: The Problematic Case of the Black Farmers Civil Rights Settlement with the Department of Agriculture. APSA Annual Meeting. https://ssrn.com/abstract=1901373.
