= List of World Sportscar Championship circuits =

The World Sportscar Championship raced on 60 different circuits on 6 continents in its 40-year history. The Nürburgring hosted 36 events, more than any other track. From 1963 to 1967, the world championship included hillclimbs in Italy, Germany, and Switzerland.

Circuit	Type	Location	Seasons	Total	Map
Alpenbergpreis Rossfeld	Hillclimb	(Germany) Berchtesgaden	1963–1965	3	
Autodrome de Linas-Montlhéry	Race circuit	(France) Linas; 48°37′19″N 2°14′11″E	1962, 1964	2	
Autodromo di Pergusa	Race circuit	(Italy) Enna; 37°30′52″N 14°18′23″E	1962–1967, 1975, 1979, 1981	9	
Autodromo Dino Ferrari	Race circuit	(Italy) Imola; 44°20′28″N 11°42′48″E	1965, 1974, 1984	3	
Autódromo Hermanos Rodríguez	Race circuit	Mexico City; 19°24′15″N 99°5′19″W	1989–1991	3	
Autodromo Internazionale del Mugello	Race circuit	(Italy) Mugello; 43°59′51″N 11°22′19″E	1965–1967, 1975–1982, 1985	12	
Autodromo Municipal Ciudad de Buenos Aires	Race circuit	(Argentina) Buenos Aires; 34°41′39″S 58°27′34″W	1954–1958, 1960, 1971–1972	8	
Autodromo Nazionale di Monza	Race circuit	(Italy) Monza; 45°37′14″N 9°17′22″E	1963–1975, 1980–1988, 1990–1992	25	
Autodromo Vallelunga Piero Taruffi	Race circuit	(Italy) Campagnano di Roma; 42°9′39″N 12°22′9″E	1973, 1976–1980	6	
Autopolis	Race circuit	(Japan) Kamitsue; 33°2′13″N 130°58′22.9″E	1991	1	
AVUS	Road circuit	(Germany) Berlin; 52°28′50″N 13°15′05″E	1962	1	
Bolzano Hillclimb	Hillclimb	(Italy) Bolzano	1965	1	
Brands Hatch	Race circuit	(United Kingdom) Swanley; 51°21′24″N 0°15′45″E	1967–1972, 1974, 1977, 1979–1982, 1984–1989	18	
Bridgehampton Circuit	Race circuit	(United States) Bridgehampton; 40°58′52.648″N 72°20′30.462″W	1962–1965	4	
Carrera Panamericana	Road circuit	(Mexico) Pan-American Highway	1953–1954	2	
Circuit Charade	Road circuit	(France) Clermont-Ferrand; 45°44′50″N 3°02′20″E	1962–1963	2	
Circuit de la Sarthe	Road circuit/Race circuit	(France) Le Mans; 47°56′16″N 0°13′32″E	1953–1955, 1957–1974, 1980–1989, 1991–1992	33	
Circuit de Nevers Magny-Cours	Race circuit	(France) Magny-Cours; 46°51′51″N 3°9′49″E	1991–1992	2	
Circuit de Spa-Francorchamps	Road circuit/Race circuit	(Belgium) Spa; 50°26′14″N 5°58′17″E	1953, 1963–1975, 1981–1990	24	
Circuit Gilles Villeneuve	Race circuit	(Canada) Montreal; 45°30′21″N 73°31′36″W	1990	1	
Circuit Paul Ricard	Race circuit	(France) Le Castellet; 43°15′2″N 5°47′30″E	1974	1	
Circuito de Jerez	Race circuit	(Spain) Jerez de la Frontera; 36°42′30″N 6°2′3″W	1986–1988	3	
Circuito del Garda	Road circuit	(Italy) Salò; 45°36′14″N 10°30′31″E	1962–1963	2	
Circuito delle Madonie	Road circuit	(Italy) Palermo; 37°56′52″N 13°47′10″E	1955, 1958–1973	17	
Circuito di Pescara	Road circuit	(Italy) Pescara; 42°28′30″N 14°9′3″E	1961	1	
Circuito Internazionale Santamonica	Race circuit	(Italy) Misano Adriatico; 43°57′41″N 12°41′0″E	1978	1	
Circuito Los Próceres	Road circuit	(Venezuela) Caracas; 10°27′55″N 66°54′6″W	1957	1	
Circuito Permanente del Jarama	Race circuit	(Spain) Madrid; 40°37′2″N 3°35′8″W	1987–1989	3	
Crans-Montana Hillclimb	Hillclimb	(Switzerland) Montana	1964, 1966	2	
Daytona International Speedway	Race circuit	(United States) Daytona Beach; 29°11′8″N 81°4′10″W	1962–1973, 1975, 1977–1981	18	
Dijon-Prenois	Race circuit	(France) Dijon; 47°21′45″N 4°53′57″E	1973, 1975–1976, 1978–1980, 1989–1990	8	
Donington Park	Race circuit	(United Kingdom) Castle Donington; 52°49′50″N 1°22′31″W	1989–1990, 1992	3	
Dundrod Circuit	Road circuit	(United Kingdom) Dundrod; 54°34′51″N 6°05′05″W	1953–1955	3	
Freiburg-Schauinsland Hillclimb	Hillclimb	(Germany) Schauinsland	1963–1965	3	
Fuji Speedway	Race circuit	(Japan) Oyama; 35°22′18″N 138°55′36″E	1982–1988	7	
Goodwood Circuit	Race circuit	(United Kingdom) Chichester; 50°51′34″N 0°45′33″W	1958–1959, 1962–1964	5	
Hockenheimring	Race circuit	(Germany) Hockenheim; 49°19′40″N 8°33′57″E	1966–1967, 1977, 1985	4	
Kyalami	Race circuit	(South Africa) Midrand; 25°59′50″S 28°4′5″E	1974, 1983–1984	3	
La Consuma Hillclimb	Hillclimb	(Italy) Consuma	1963–1964	2	
Masaryk Circuit	Race circuit	(Czech Republic) Brno; 49°12′17″N 16°27′02″E	1988	1	
Mille Miglia	Road circuit	(Italy) Brescia	1953–1957	5	
Mosport Park	Race circuit	(Canada) Bowmanville; 44°2′53″N 78°40′32″W	1977, 1980–1981, 1984–1985	6	
Norisring	Road circuit	(Germany) Nuremberg; 49°25′53″N 11°07′30″E	1986–1987	2	
Nürburgring	Road circuit/Race circuit	(Germany) Nürburg; 50°20′08″N 6°56′51″E	1953, 1956–1984, 1986–1991	36	
Ollon-Villars Hillclimb	Hillclimb	(Switzerland) Ollon-Villars	1963, 1965, 1967	3	
Oulton Park	Race circuit	(United Kingdom) Little Budworth; 53°10′39″N 2°36′52″W	1965	1	
Österreichring	Race circuit	(Austria) Zeltweg; 47°13′11″N 14°45′53″E	1969–1976	8	
Råbelövsbanan	Road circuit	(Sweden) Kristianstad	1956–1957	2	
Reims-Gueux	Road circuit	(France) Reims; 49°15′15″N 3°55′51″E	1964–1965	2	
Riverside International Raceway	Race circuit	(United States) Riverside; 33°56′13″N 117°16′21″W	1981	1	
Road America	Race circuit	(United States) Elkhart Lake; 43°48′0″N 87°59′13″W	1981	1	
Sandown Raceway	Race circuit	(Australia) Melbourne; 37°57′3″S 145°10′2″E	1984, 1988	2	
Sebring International Raceway	Race circuit	(United States) Sebring; 27°27′17″N 81°20′54″W	1953–1972, 1981	22	
Shah Alam Circuit	Race circuit	(Malaysia) Shah Alam; 3°4′34″N 101°32′38″E	1985	1	
Silverstone Circuit	Race circuit	(United Kingdom) Silverstone; 52°4′43″N 1°1′1″W	1976–1988, 1990–1992	16	
Suzuka Circuit	Race circuit	(Japan) Suzuka; 34°50′35″N 136°32′26″E	1989–1992	4	
Tour de France	Various	Various cities	1963–1964	2	
Watkins Glen International	Race circuit	(United States) Watkins Glen; 42°20′13″N 76°55′38″W	1968–1981	22	
Wiesbaden-Rallye	Road circuit	(Germany) Wiesbaden	1963	1	
Zeltweg Airfield	Race circuit	(Austria) Zeltweg; 47°12′14″N 14°44′52″E	1966–1968	3	
