= 1965 Targa Florio =

Motorcar race in Italy

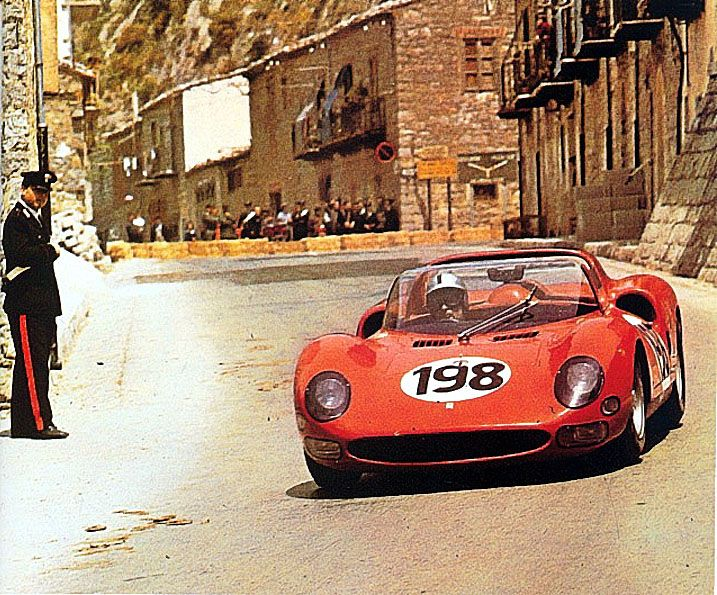
The winning Ferrari 275 P2 of Vaccarella/Bandini speeds through Collesano

The 49° Targa Florio took place on 9 May 1965, on the Circuito Piccolo delle Madonie, Sicily (Italy).

== Race ==
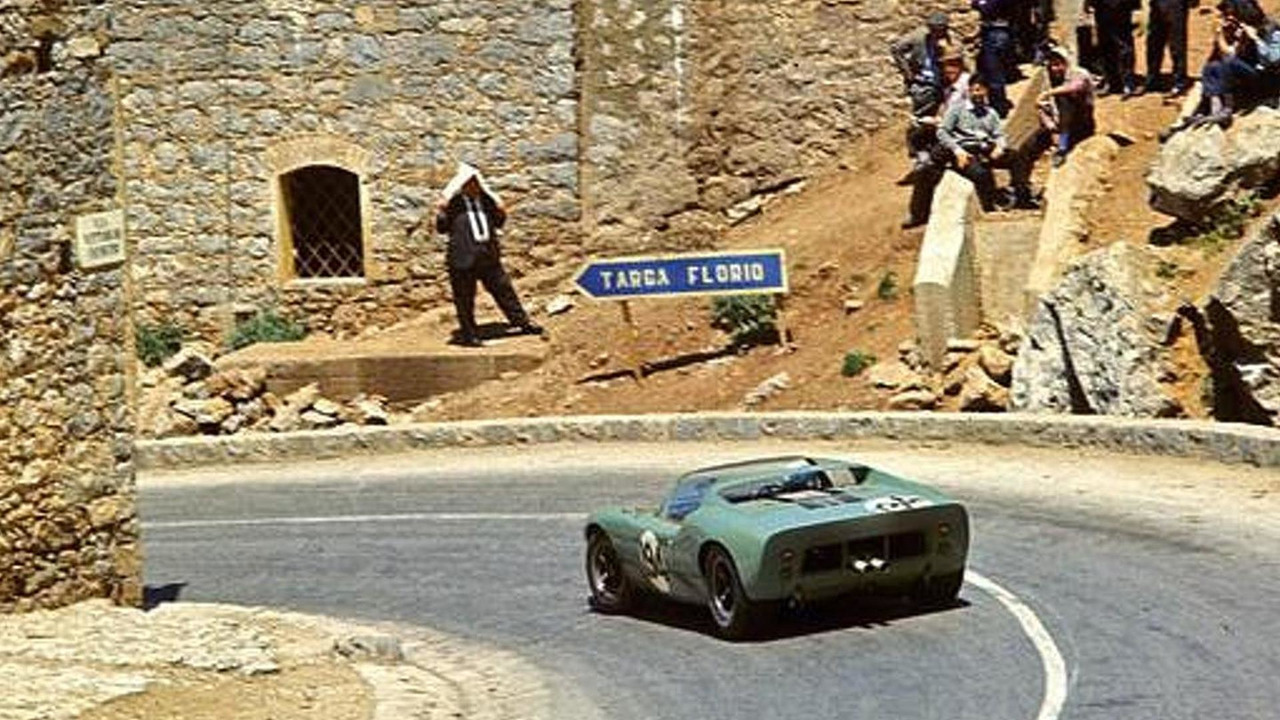
The Ford GT40 roadster of Bondurant/Whitmore in its Targa Florio debut

The Scuderia Ferrari team returned after a year of voluntary absence, deploying 3 of the new prototype-class, 3.3L 275 P2. Porsche responded with the 904 in its various iterations including the experimental 904 Bergspyder, an open, lightweight, hillclimbing prototype based on the 8-cylinder 904/8. Ford replaced the under-performing Cobras of the previous year with a single GT40 roadster.
The race was ultimately dominated by the Ferrari 275 P2 driven by Vaccarella and Bandini, while the Bergspyder achieved the second place. The heavy and overpowered Ford GT40 struggled in the tortuous track but managed to complete most of the race, crashing during the 9th lap.

== Official results ==
Pos	Class	No	Team	Drivers	Chassis	Laps
1	P +3.0	198	(Italy) Ferrari SEFAC	(Italy) Nino Vaccarella (Italy) Lorenzo Bandini	Ferrari 275 P2	10
2	P 2.0	182	(Germany) Porsche System Engineering	(England) Colin Davis (Germany) Gerhard Mitter	Porsche 904/8 Bergspyder	10
3	P 2.0	176	(Germany) Porsche System Engineering	(Italy) Umberto Maglioli (Germany) Herbert Linge	Porsche 904/6	10

World Sportscar Championship
Previous race: 1965 RAC Tourist Trophy	1965 season	Next race: 1965 500 km of Spa
