= 1964 Targa Florio =

Italian racing event

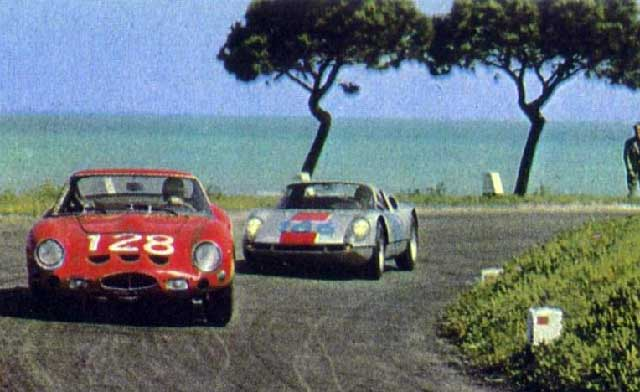
The Ferrari 250 GTO #128 of Nicolosi/Zanardelli pursued by the Porsche 904/8 #186 of Barth/Maglioli. They ended 13th and 6th, respectively

The 48° Targa Florio took place on 26 April 1964, on the Circuito Piccolo delle Madonie, Sicily (Italy). Porsche took the overall victory.

== Race ==
The event was marked by the absence of Scuderia Ferrari: FIA refused to homologate the brand new 250 LM as a GT-class racer, and Ferrari boycotted the race in protest. The Ferraris that took part in the race were all driven by privateers.
The prototype-class Porsche 718 RS Spyder driven by Jo Bonnier and Graham Hill took the lead, but had to retire during the second lap. Then the leading Porsche 904/8 of Edgar Barth and Umberto Maglioli suffered some time-wasting issue and was overtaken by the Ferrari 250 GTO '64 of Carlo Facetti and Jean Guichet, which had to retire during lap 6 for gearbox issues. The Shelby Cobra's debut at the Targa Florio was disappointing as they soon proved too heavy and unwieldy for the narrow and twisty track. In the end, the podium went to 3 GT-class, with Porsche scoring a double victory with the 904 GTS of Antonio Pucci/Colin Davis and Gianni Balzarini/Herbert Linge, respectively.

== Official results ==
| Pos | Class | No | Team | Drivers | Chassis | Laps |
|---|---|---|---|---|---|---|
| 1 | GT; 2.0 | 86 | (Germany) Porsche System Engineering | (Italy) Antonio Pucci (England) Colin Davis | Porsche 904 GTS | 10 |
| 2 | GT; 2.0 | 84 | (Germany) Porsche System Engineering | (Italy) Gianni Balzarini (Germany) Herbert Linge | Porsche 904 GTS | 10 |
| 3 | GT; 1.6 | 58 | (Italy) Scuderia Sant'Ambroeus | (Italy) Roberto Bussinello (Italy) Nino Todaro | Alfa Romeo Giulia TZ | 10 |

World Sportscar Championship
| Previous race: 1964 12 Hours of Sebring | 1964 season | Next race: 1964 500 km of Spa |
