= 6 Hours of Spa-Francorchamps =

Endurance sports car event

(Belgium) 6 Hours of Spa-Francorchamps 6 Heures de Spa-Francorchamps (French)

FIA World Endurance Championship
- Venue: Circuit de Spa-Francorchamps
- First race: 1953
- First FIA WEC race: 2012
- Duration: 6 hours
- Most wins (driver): Jacky Ickx; Sébastien Buemi (5)
- Most wins (team): Toyota Gazoo Racing (7)
- Most wins (manufacturer): (Italy) Ferrari (11)

The 6 Hours of Spa-Francorchamps (formerly the 1000 Kilometres of Spa-Francorchamps) is an endurance race for sports cars held at Circuit de Spa-Francorchamps in Belgium.

== History ==
The Spa 24 Hours had been introduced in 1924, and other races followed. As on the Nürburgring, both a 24-hour race for touring cars and GTs is held, and an endurance race for sports cars and GTs. The 24 hour race counted towards the inaugural World Sports Car championship in 1953, the last time that race would be held until 1964, and the last time it was for sports cars for several decades. Earlier in 1953 a minor sports car race, the Coupe de Spa was the first race held in the lineage of the 1000 km (now 6 hour) race. The first Spa Grand Prix was held in 1954, and in 1963 joined the World Sportscar Championship and was extended to 500 km. Starting in 1966 the name Spa Grand Prix was no-longer used, and the race was run for 1000 km, following the 1000 km Nürburgring and 1000 km Monza. Due to safety problems on the traditional long and very fast 14 km track over public roads, the race was discontinued after 1975.

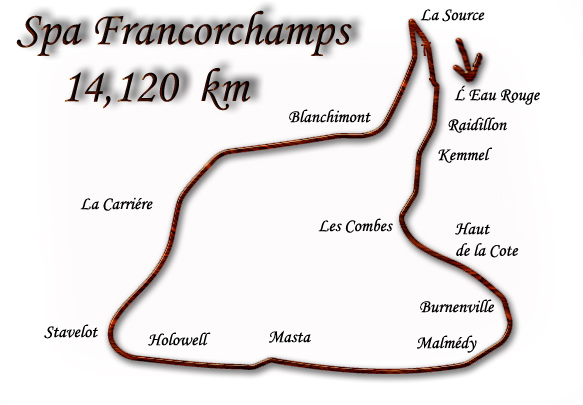
The 14km Spa used by sportscars up until 1975

The 1000 km race was resumed in 1982 after the track was made safer by shortening it to 7 km. In 1989 and 1990, the race distance was lowered to 480 km. Due to the decline of the WSC, the "1000km" was discontinued after 1990 even before the WSC closed.

The race was revived in 1999, as a part of the SportsRacing World Cup (the predecessor to the FIA Sportscar Championship), running to a 2-hour, 30 minute time limit. In 2003, the 1000 km race was resumed as a joint event of the FIA SCC with the British GT Championship. In 2004, it was part of the Le Mans Series (LMS), and in 2011 was also part of the Intercontinental Le Mans Cup. From 2012 onwards the race has been part of the FIA World Endurance Championship, albeit in the format of a six-hour race.

Jacky Ickx currently holds record of most wins, having won the race 5 times, in 1967, 1968, 1974, 1982, and 1983. He is also one of two drivers to win the 1000 km on both the original and current circuits, the other being Derek Bell.

== Winners ==
| Year | Drivers | Team | Car | Time | Distance | Championship |
14.1 km (8.8 mi) circuit
| 1953 | (Belgium) Olivier Gendebien | | Ferrari 166 MM | | | Non-championship |
| 1954 | (Netherlands) Hans Davids | (Netherlands) Hans Davids | Jaguar C-Type | | 169 km (105 mi) | Non-championship |
| 1955 | (Belgium) Paul Frère | (United Kingdom) Aston Martin | Aston Martin DB3S | 1:37:33.900 | 282 km (175 mi) | Non-championship |
| 1956 | (United Kingdom) Ninian Sanderson | (United Kingdom) Ecurie Ecosse | Jaguar D-Type | 0:57:34.800 | 169 km (105 mi) | Non-championship |
| 1957 | (United Kingdom) Tony Brooks | (United Kingdom) Aston Martin | Aston Martin DBR1 | 1:15:56.000 | 211.8 km (131.6 mi) | Non-championship |
| 1958 | (United States) Masten Gregory | (United Kingdom) Ecurie Ecosse | Lister-Jaguar | 1:05:02.300 | 211.8 km (131.6 mi) | Non-championship |
| 1959 | (Netherlands) Carel Godin de Beaufort | (Netherlands) Ecurie Maarsbergen | Porsche 718 RSK | 1:11:10.100 | 211.8 km (131.6 mi) | Non-championship |
| 1960 | (Belgium) Paul Frère | | Porsche 718 RSK | 1:20:54.800 | 211.8 km (131.6 mi) | Non-championship |
| 1961 | (Belgium) Willy Mairesse | (Italy) Scuderia Ferrari | Ferrari 250 GT Berlinetta SWB | 1:05:33.800 | 211.8 km (131.6 mi) | Non-championship |
| 1962 | (Switzerland) Edgar Berney | (Switzerland) Edgar Berney | Ferrari 250 GT Berlinetta SWB | 1:12:32.100 | 211.8 km (131.6 mi) | Non-championship |
| 1963 | (Belgium) Willy Mairesse | (Belgium) Ecurie Nationale Belge | Ferrari 250 GTO | 2:38:40:800 | 500 km (310 mi) | International Championship for GT Manufacturers |
| 1964 | (United Kingdom) Mike Parkes | (United Kingdom) Maranello Concessionaires | Ferrari 250 GTO | 2:32:05.200 | 500 km (310 mi) | International Championship for GT Manufacturers |
| 1965 | (Belgium) Willy Mairesse | (Belgium) Ecurie Francorchamps | Ferrari 250 LM | 2:29:45.700 | 500 km (310 mi) | International Championship for GT Manufacturers; International Trophy for GT Prototypes |
| 1966 | (Italy) Ludovico Scarfiotti (United Kingdom) Mike Parkes | (Italy) SpA Ferrari SEFAC | Ferrari 330 P3 | 4:43:24.000 | 1,000 km (620 mi) | International Manufacturers' Championship; International Sports Car Championship |
| 1967 | (Belgium) Jacky Ickx (United States) Dick Thompson | (United Kingdom) J.W. Automotive Engineering | Mirage M1-Ford | 5:09:46.500 | 1,000 km (620 mi) | International Championship for Sports-Prototypes; International Championship for Sports Cars |
| 1968 | (Belgium) Jacky Ickx (United Kingdom) Brian Redman | (United Kingdom) J.W. Automotive Engineering | Ford GT40 Mk.I | 5:05:19:300 | 1,000 km (620 mi) | International Championship for Makes; International Cup for GT Cars |
| 1969 | (Switzerland) Jo Siffert (United Kingdom) Brian Redman | (West Germany) Porsche System Engineering | Porsche 908LH | 4:24:19.600 | 1,000 km (620 mi) | International Championship for Makes; International Cup for GT Cars |
| 1970 | (Switzerland) Jo Siffert (United Kingdom) Brian Redman | (United Kingdom) J.W. Automotive Engineering | Porsche 917K | 4:09:47.800 | 1,000 km (620 mi) | International Championship for Makes; International Cup for GT Cars |
| 1971 | (Mexico) Pedro Rodríguez (United Kingdom) Jackie Oliver | (United Kingdom) J.W. Automotive Engineering | Porsche 917K | 4:01:09.700 | 1,000 km (620 mi) | International Championship for Makes; International Cup for GT Cars |
| 1972 | (Italy) Arturo Merzario (United Kingdom) Brian Redman | (Italy) SpA Ferrari SEFAC | Ferrari 312 PB | 4:17:19.100 | 1,000 km (620 mi) | World Championship for Makes; International Grand Touring Trophy |
| 1973 | (United Kingdom) Derek Bell (United Kingdom) Mike Hailwood | (United Kingdom) Gulf Research | Mirage M6-Ford | 4:05:43.500 | 1,000 km (620 mi) | World Championship for Makes; International Grand Touring Trophy |
| 1974 | (Belgium) Jacky Ickx (France) Jean-Pierre Jarier | (France) Equipe Gitanes | Matra-Simca MS670C | 4:12:15.600 | 1,000 km (620 mi) | World Championship for Makes; FIA Cup for GT Cars |
| 1975 | (France) Henri Pescarolo (United Kingdom) Derek Bell | (West Germany) Willi Kauhsen Racing Team | Alfa Romeo 33TT12 | 3:32:58.400 | 750 km (470 mi)^{1} | World Championship for Makes; FIA Cup for GT Cars; FIA Cup for 2-Litre Cars |
| 1976 to 1981 | No Races | | | | | |
7.0 km (4.3 mi) circuit
| 1982 | (Belgium) Jacky Ickx (West Germany) Jochen Mass | (West Germany) Rothmans Porsche | Porsche 956 | 6:06:04.140 | 1,000 km (620 mi) | World Endurance Championship |
| 1983 | (Belgium) Jacky Ickx (West Germany) Jochen Mass | (West Germany) Rothmans Porsche | Porsche 956 | 5:44:33.520 | 1,000 km (620 mi) | World Endurance Championship; European Endurance Championship |
| 1984 | (West Germany) Stefan Bellof (United Kingdom) Derek Bell | (West Germany) Rothmans Porsche | Porsche 956B | 5:53:17.190 | 1,000 km (620 mi) | World Endurance Championship |
| 1985 | (France) Bob Wollek (Italy) Mauro Baldi | (Italy) Martini Racing | Lancia LC2 | 5:00:23.420 | 848 km (527 mi)^{2} | World Endurance Championship |
| 1986 | (Belgium) Thierry Boutsen (West Germany) Frank Jelinski | (Switzerland) Brun Motorsport | Porsche 962C | 5:35:54.540 | 1,000 km (620 mi) | World Sports Prototype Championship |
| 1987 | (Brazil) Raul Boesel (United Kingdom) Martin Brundle (United Kingdom) Johnny Dumfries | (United Kingdom) Silk Cut Jaguar | Jaguar XJR-8 | 6:00:16.180 | 1,000 km (620 mi) | World Sports Prototype Championship |
| 1988 | (Italy) Mauro Baldi (Sweden) Stefan Johansson | (Switzerland) Team Sauber Mercedes | Sauber C9-Mercedes | 6:01:34.230 | 1,000 km (620 mi) | World Sports Prototype Championship |
| 1989 | (Italy) Mauro Baldi (United Kingdom) Kenny Acheson | (West Germany) Team Sauber Mercedes | Sauber C9-Mercedes | 2:39:16.453 | 480 km (300 mi) | World Sports Prototype Championship |
| 1990 | (West Germany) Jochen Mass (Austria) Karl Wendlinger | (West Germany) Team Sauber Mercedes | Mercedes-Benz C11 | 2:42:54.880 | 480 km (300 mi) | World Sports Prototype Championship |
| 1991 to 1998 | No Races | | | | | |
| 1999 | (France) Laurent Rédon (Italy) Mauro Baldi | (France) JB Giesse Team Ferrari | Ferrari 333 SP | 2:30:24.347 | 452.920 km (281.431 mi) | SportsRacing World Cup |
| 2000 | (Italy) Filippo Francioni (Italy) Salvatore Ronca | (Italy) Lucchini Engineering | Lucchini SR2000-Alfa Romeo | 2:31:17.377 | 355.368 km (220.815 mi) | SportsRacing World Cup |
| 2001 | (Italy) Marco Zadra (France) Jean-Marc Gounon | (Italy) BMS Scuderia Italia | Ferrari 333 SP | 2:31:27.898 | 445.952 km (277.102 mi) | FIA Sportscar Championship |
| 2002 | (France) Sébastien Bourdais (France) Jean-Christophe Boullion | (France) Pescarolo Sport | Courage C60 EVO-Peugeot | 2:03:16.089^{3} | 376.272 km (233.805 mi) | FIA Sportscar Championship |
| 2003 | (Denmark) Tom Kristensen (Japan) Seiji Ara | Audi Sport Japan | Audi R8 | 5:47:50.209 | 1,000 km (620 mi) | FIA Sportscar Championship; British GT Championship |
| 2004 | (United Kingdom) Johnny Herbert (United Kingdom) Jamie Davies | (United Kingdom) Audi Sport UK Veloqx | Audi R8 | 5:58:55.262 | 1,000 km (620 mi) | Le Mans Endurance Series |
| 2005 | (Denmark) John Nielsen (Denmark) Casper Elgaard (Japan) Hayanari Shimoda | (United Kingdom) Zytek Motorsport | Zytek 04S | 6:00:48.389 | 1,000 km (620 mi) | Le Mans Endurance Series |
| 2006 | (France) Emmanuel Collard (France) Jean-Christophe Boullion | (France) Pescarolo Sport | Pescarolo C60-Judd | 6:01:06.782 | 1,000 km (620 mi) | Le Mans Series |
| 2007 | (France) Stéphane Sarrazin (Portugal) Pedro Lamy | (France) Team Peugeot Total | Peugeot 908 HDi FAP (Diesel) | 5:47:47.313 | 1,000 km (620 mi) | Le Mans Series |
| 2008 | (Canada) Jacques Villeneuve (France) Nicolas Minassian (Spain) Marc Gené | (France) Team Peugeot Total | Peugeot 908 HDi FAP (Diesel) | 5:17:48.566 | 1,000 km (620 mi) | Le Mans Series |
| 2009 | (France) Nicolas Minassian (France) Simon Pagenaud (Austria) Christian Klien | (France) Team Peugeot Total | Peugeot 908 HDi FAP (Diesel) | 5:45:35.429 | 1,000 km (620 mi) | Le Mans Series |
| 2010 | (France) Sébastien Bourdais (France) Simon Pagenaud (Portugal) Pedro Lamy | (France) Team Peugeot Total | Peugeot 908 HDi FAP (Diesel) | 6:00:39.012 | 975 km (606 mi)^{4} | Le Mans Series |
| 2011 | (Austria) Alexander Wurz (United Kingdom) Anthony Davidson (Spain) Marc Gené | (France) Team Peugeot Total | Peugeot 908 (Diesel) | 6:02:03.799 | 1,127.633 km (700.679 mi) | Le Mans Series; Intercontinental Le Mans Cup |
| 2012 | (France) Romain Dumas (France) Loïc Duval (Spain) Marc Gené | (Germany) Audi Sport Team Joest | Audi R18 ultra (Diesel) | 6:00:22.708 | 1,120.62 km (696.32 mi) | FIA World Endurance Championship |
| 2013 | (France) Benoît Tréluyer (Germany) André Lotterer (Switzerland) Marcel Fässler | (Germany) Audi Sport Team Joest | Audi R18 e-tron quattro (Diesel hybrid) | 6:00:55.971 | 1,176.67 km (731.15 mi) | FIA World Endurance Championship |
| 2014 | (France) Nicolas Lapierre (Switzerland) Sébastien Buemi (United Kingdom) Anthony Davidson | (Japan) Toyota Racing | Toyota TS040 Hybrid | 6:01:31.675 | 1,197.68 km (744.20 mi) | FIA World Endurance Championship |
| 2015 | (France) Benoît Tréluyer (Germany) André Lotterer (Switzerland) Marcel Fässler | (Germany) Audi Sport Team Joest | Audi R18 e-tron quattro (Diesel hybrid) | 6:01:08.896 | 1,232.704 km (765.967 mi) ^{6} | FIA World Endurance Championship |
| 2016 | (France) Loïc Duval (United Kingdom) Oliver Jarvis (Brazil) Lucas di Grassi | (Germany) Audi Sport Team Joest | Audi R18 e-tron quattro (Diesel hybrid) | 6:00:32.112 | 1,120.640 km (696.333 mi) | FIA World Endurance Championship |
| 2017 | (Switzerland) Sébastien Buemi (Japan) Kazuki Nakajima (United Kingdom) Anthony Davidson | (Japan) Toyota Gazoo Racing | Toyota TS050 Hybrid | 6:00:11.490 | 1,211.692 km (752.911 mi) | FIA World Endurance Championship |
| 2018 | (Spain) Fernando Alonso (Switzerland) Sébastien Buemi (Japan) Kazuki Nakajima | (Japan) Toyota Gazoo Racing | Toyota TS050 Hybrid | 6:00:50.702 | 1,141.652 km (709.390 mi) | FIA World Endurance Championship |
| 2019 | (Spain) Fernando Alonso (Switzerland) Sébastien Buemi (Japan) Kazuki Nakajima | (Japan) Toyota Gazoo Racing | Toyota TS050 Hybrid | 5:44:41.101 ^{5} | 931.532 km (578.827 mi) | FIA World Endurance Championship |
| 2020 | (United Kingdom) Mike Conway (Japan) Kamui Kobayashi (Argentina) José María López | (Japan) Toyota Gazoo Racing | Toyota TS050 Hybrid | 6:00:02.534 | 1,001.572 km (622.348 mi) | FIA World Endurance Championship |
| 2021 | (Switzerland) Sébastien Buemi (New Zealand) Brendon Hartley (Japan) Kazuki Nakajima | (Japan) Toyota Gazoo Racing | Toyota GR010 Hybrid | 6:00:17.733 | 1,134.648 km (705.038 mi) | FIA World Endurance Championship |
| 2022 | (Argentina) José María López (United Kingdom) Mike Conway (Japan) Kamui Kobayashi | (Japan) Toyota Gazoo Racing | Toyota GR010 Hybrid | 6:00:31.052 | 721.412 km (448.265 mi) | FIA World Endurance Championship |
| 2023 | (Argentina) José María López (United Kingdom) Mike Conway (Japan) Kamui Kobayashi | (Japan) Toyota Gazoo Racing | Toyota GR010 Hybrid | 6:00:24.798 | 1,036.455 km (644.023 mi) | FIA World Endurance Championship |
| 2024 | (United Kingdom) Callum Ilott (United Kingdom) Will Stevens | (United Kingdom) Hertz Team Jota | Porsche 963 | 5:57:31.542 | 987.428 km (613.559 mi) | FIA World Endurance Championship |
| 2025 | (United Kingdom) James Calado (Italy) Antonio Giovinazzi (Italy) Alessandro Pier Guidi | (Italy) Ferrari AF Corse | Ferrari 499P | 6:01:07.299 | 1,050.478 km (652.737 mi) | FIA World Endurance Championship |
| 2026 | (Netherlands) Robin Frijns (Germany) René Rast (South Africa) Sheldon van der Linde | (Germany) BMW M Team WRT | BMW M Hybrid V8 | 6:01:17.036 | 1,057.6 km (657.2 mi) | FIA World Endurance Championship |

^1 The 1975 event was originally scheduled for 1000 km, but was shortened to 750 km the day of the race due to an approaching storm.
^2 The 1985 event was originally scheduled for 1000 km, but was shortened to five hours (848 km) after the ensuing 40-minute caution caused by the collision of the Bellof/Boutsen Brun Motorsport Porsche 956 with the Ickx/Jochen Mass Rothmans Porsche 962 at Eau Rouge. Bellof died in the hospital afterwards, and officials ended the race at the five-hour mark, after 122 of 145 laps.
^3 The 2002 event was stopped early due to heavy rain.
^4 The 2010 event was red flagged during the race due to electrical outages. The race covered approximately 975 km when it ended on a six hour time limit.
^5 The 2019 event was stopped early because of snow.
^6 Race record for distance covered.

=== Records ===
==== Wins by constructor ====
| Rank | Constructor | Wins | Years |
|---|---|---|---|
| 1 | (Italy) Ferrari | 11 | 1953, 1961–1966, 1972, 1999, 2001, 2025 |
| 2 | (Germany) Porsche | 10 | 1959, 1960, 1969–1971, 1982–1984, 1986, 2024 |
| 3 | (Japan) Toyota | 8 | 2014, 2017–2023 |
| 4 | (Germany) Audi | 6 | 2003, 2004, 2012, 2013, 2015, 2016 |
| 5 | (France) Peugeot | 5 | 2007–2011 |
| 6 | (United Kingdom) Jaguar | 3 | 1954, 1956, 1987 |
| 7 | (United Kingdom) Aston Martin | 2 | 1955, 1957 |
| 7 | (United Kingdom) Mirage | 2 | 1967, 1973 |
| 7 | (Switzerland) Sauber | 2 | 1988, 1989 |
| 7 | (France) Courage | 2 | 2002, 2006 |
| 12 | (United Kingdom) Lister | 1 | 1958 |
| 12 | (United States) Ford | 1 | 1968 |
| 12 | (France) Matra | 1 | 1974 |
| 12 | (Italy) Alfa Romeo | 1 | 1975 |
| 12 | (Italy) Lancia | 1 | 1985 |
| 12 | (West Germany) Mercedes-Benz | 1 | 1990 |
| 12 | (Italy) Lucchini | 1 | 2000 |
| 12 | (United Kingdom) Reynard | 1 | 2005 |
| 12 | (West Germany) BMW | 1 | 2026 |

==== Wins by engine manufacturer ====
| Rank | Manufacturer | Wins | Years |
|---|---|---|---|
| 1 | (Italy) Ferrari | 12 | 1953, 1961–1966, 1972, 1985, 1999, 2001, 2025 |
| 2 | (Germany) Porsche | 10 | 1959, 1960, 1969–1971, 1982–1984, 1986, 2024 |
| 3 | (Japan) Toyota | 8 | 2014, 2017–2023 |
| 4 | (France) Peugeot | 6 | 2002, 2007–2011 |
| 4 | (Germany) Audi | 6 | 2003, 2004, 2012, 2013, 2015, 2016 |
| 6 | (United Kingdom) Jaguar | 4 | 1954, 1956, 1958, 1987 |
| 7 | (United States) Ford | 3 | 1967, 1968, 1973 |
| 7 | (West Germany) Mercedes-Benz | 3 | 1988–1990 |
| 9 | (United Kingdom) Aston Martin | 2 | 1955, 1957 |
| 9 | (Italy) Alfa Romeo | 2 | 1975, 2000 |
| 13 | (France) Matra | 1 | 1974 |
| 13 | (United Kingdom) Gibson | 1 | 2005 |
| 13 | (United Kingdom) Judd | 1 | 2006 |
| 13 | (West Germany) BMW | 1 | 2026 |

==== Drivers with multiple wins ====
| Rank | Driver | Wins | Years |
|---|---|---|---|
| 1 | (Belgium) Jacky Ickx | 5 | 1967, 1968, 1974, 1982, 1983 |
| 1 | (Switzerland) Sébastien Buemi | 5 | 2014, 2017–2019, 2021 |
| 3 | (United Kingdom) Brian Redman | 4 | 1968–1970, 1972 |
| 3 | (Italy) Mauro Baldi | 4 | 1985, 1988, 1989, 1999 |
| 3 | (Japan) Kazuki Nakajima | 4 | 2017–2019, 2021 |
| 6 | (Belgium) Willy Mairesse | 3 | 1961, 1963, 1965 |
| 6 | (United Kingdom) Derek Bell | 3 | 1973, 1975, 1984 |
| 6 | (West Germany) Jochen Mass | 3 | 1982, 1983, 1990 |
| 6 | (Spain) Marc Gené | 3 | 2008, 2011, 2012 |
| 6 | (United Kingdom) Anthony Davidson | 3 | 2011, 2014, 2017 |
| 6 | (United Kingdom) Mike Conway | 3 | 2020, 2022, 2023 |
| 6 | (Japan) Kamui Kobayashi | 3 | 2020, 2022, 2023 |
| 6 | (Argentina) José María López | 3 | 2020, 2022, 2023 |
| 14 | (Belgium) Paul Frère | 2 | 1955, 1960 |
| 14 | (United Kingdom) Mike Parkes | 2 | 1955, 1960 |
| 14 | (Switzerland) Jo Siffert | 2 | 1969, 1970 |
| 14 | (France) Jean-Christophe Boullion | 2 | 2002, 2006 |
| 14 | (France) Sébastien Bourdais | 2 | 2002, 2010 |
| 14 | (Portugal) Pedro Lamy | 2 | 2007, 2010 |
| 14 | (France) Nicolas Minassian | 2 | 2008, 2009 |
| 14 | (France) Simon Pagenaud | 2 | 2009, 2010 |
| 14 | (France) Loïc Duval | 2 | 2012, 2016 |
| 14 | (France) Benoît Tréluyer | 2 | 2013, 2015 |
| 14 | (Germany) André Lotterer | 2 | 2013, 2015 |
| 14 | (Switzerland) Marcel Fässler | 2 | 2013, 2015 |
| 14 | (Spain) Fernando Alonso | 2 | 2018, 2019 |
