= Porsche 901 =

Originally intended for the Porsche 911

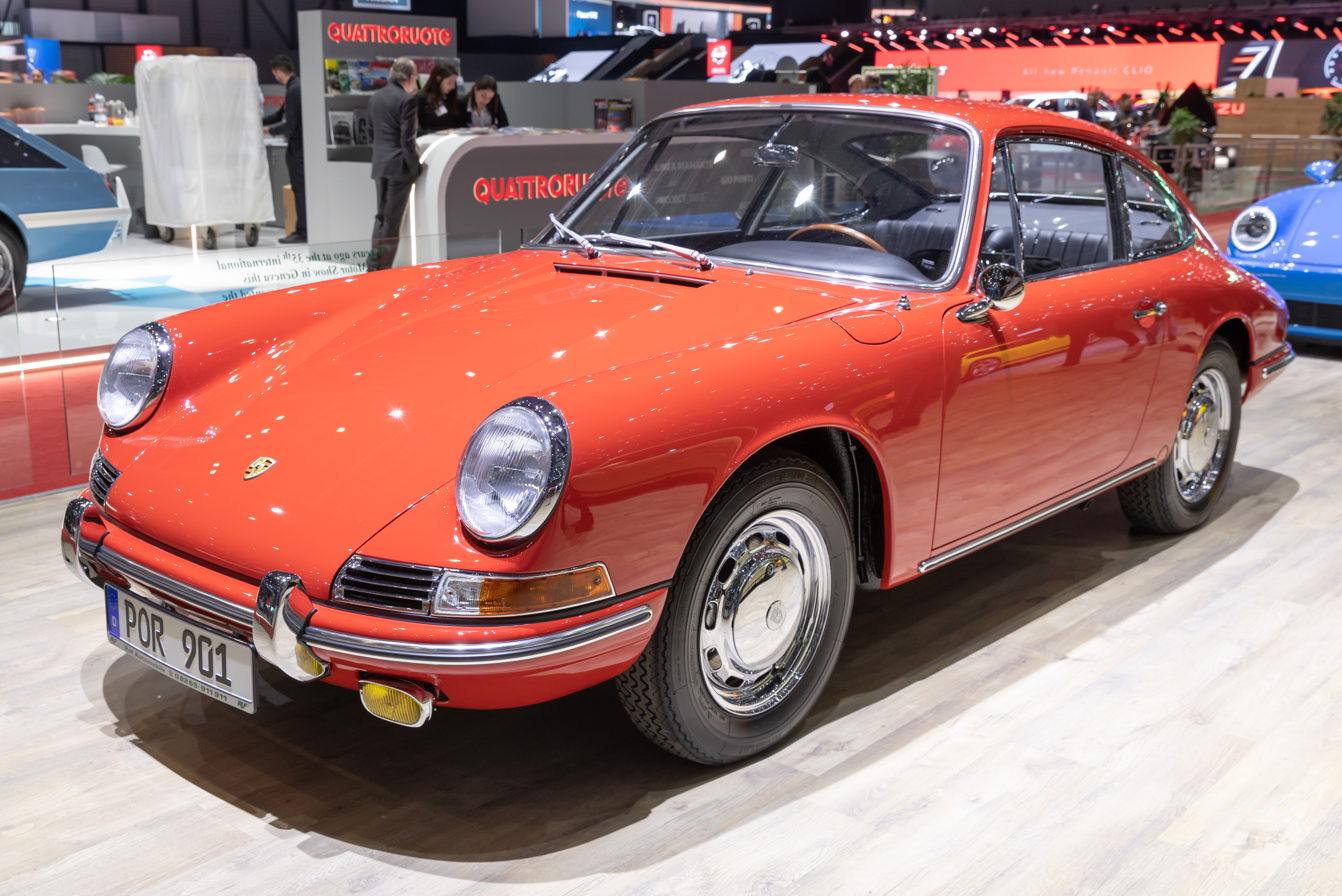
Porsche 901 on display at the 2019 Geneva Motor Show

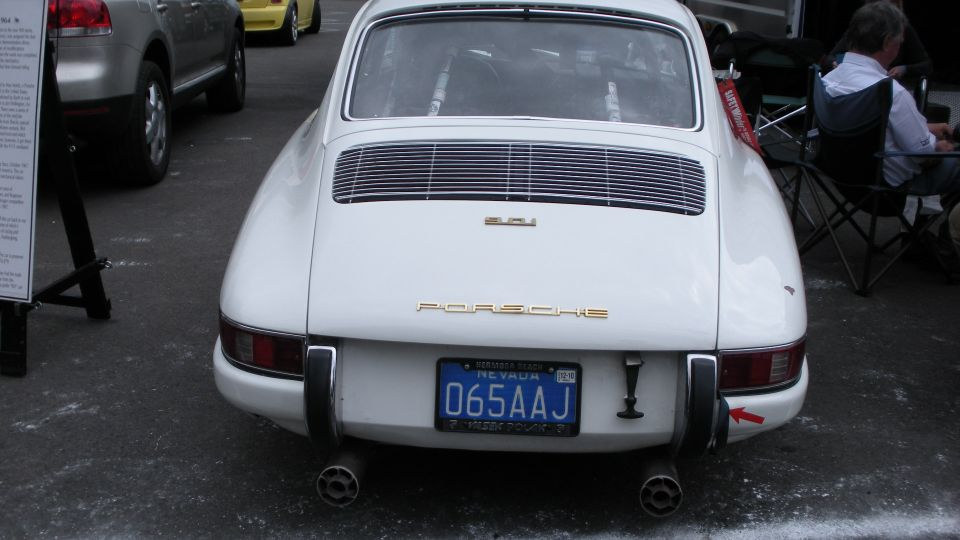
Porsche 901 factory demonstrator used by Edgar Barth

Porsche 901 was the name originally intended for the Porsche 911.

By the early 1960s, Porsche project design numbers had reached into the 800s. For instance, Porsche's 1962 F1 model was called Porsche 804.

At the Internationale Automobil-Ausstellung (Frankfurt Motor Show) in Frankfurt in September 1963, Porsche presented its successor to the Porsche 356 as the 901. It took several more months until the cars were manufactured for sale to customers. Between 14 September and 16 November 1964, 82 cars were built and the 901 was presented in October at the 1964 Paris Auto Salon. Officially the 901s already constructed were used for testing and for exhibitions, and Porsche sold none to private customers. Nevertheless, several of the cars retained by Porsche at that time appear to have made it to private ownership subsequently: in 1988 number 20 was discovered and completely restored by Kurt Schneider and his wife, Lori. In 2010, it was reported that car number 37 was owned by a Porsche specialist named Alois Ruf.

The 901 was renamed after French car maker Peugeot objected to Porsche using any three digit number where the middle number was 0, asserting ownership of the naming rights in key markets, and having already sold many models with that scheme. Porsche responded by simply replacing the middle 0 with a 1, calling the car the Porsche 911. This also affected other Porsche models, which were primarily intended for racing but also sold as road legal cars. In those cases, Porsche kept the internal part number of 90x, but used a unique name for marketing, selling the Porsche 904 as the Carrera GTS and the Porsche 906 as the Carrera 6. Porsche enthusiasts continue to refer to these cars by their three digit design numbers.

Later, Porsche introduced pure racing cars which were not sold for road use, and did not compete with any road-going Peugeot. These carried the design numbers Porsche 907, Porsche 908, and Porsche 909. Additionally, the 901 number is used among Porsche enthusiasts as shorthand to identify the aluminum five-speed transmission used in early 911s; the part number for these transmissions used an 11 digit code that began with 901 as did many other parts on the early cars. Later 911s from 1969 used a different magnesium case and a part number beginning with 911.
