= 1965 World Sportscar Championship =

Racing tournament

Seasons
- ← 1964 1966 →

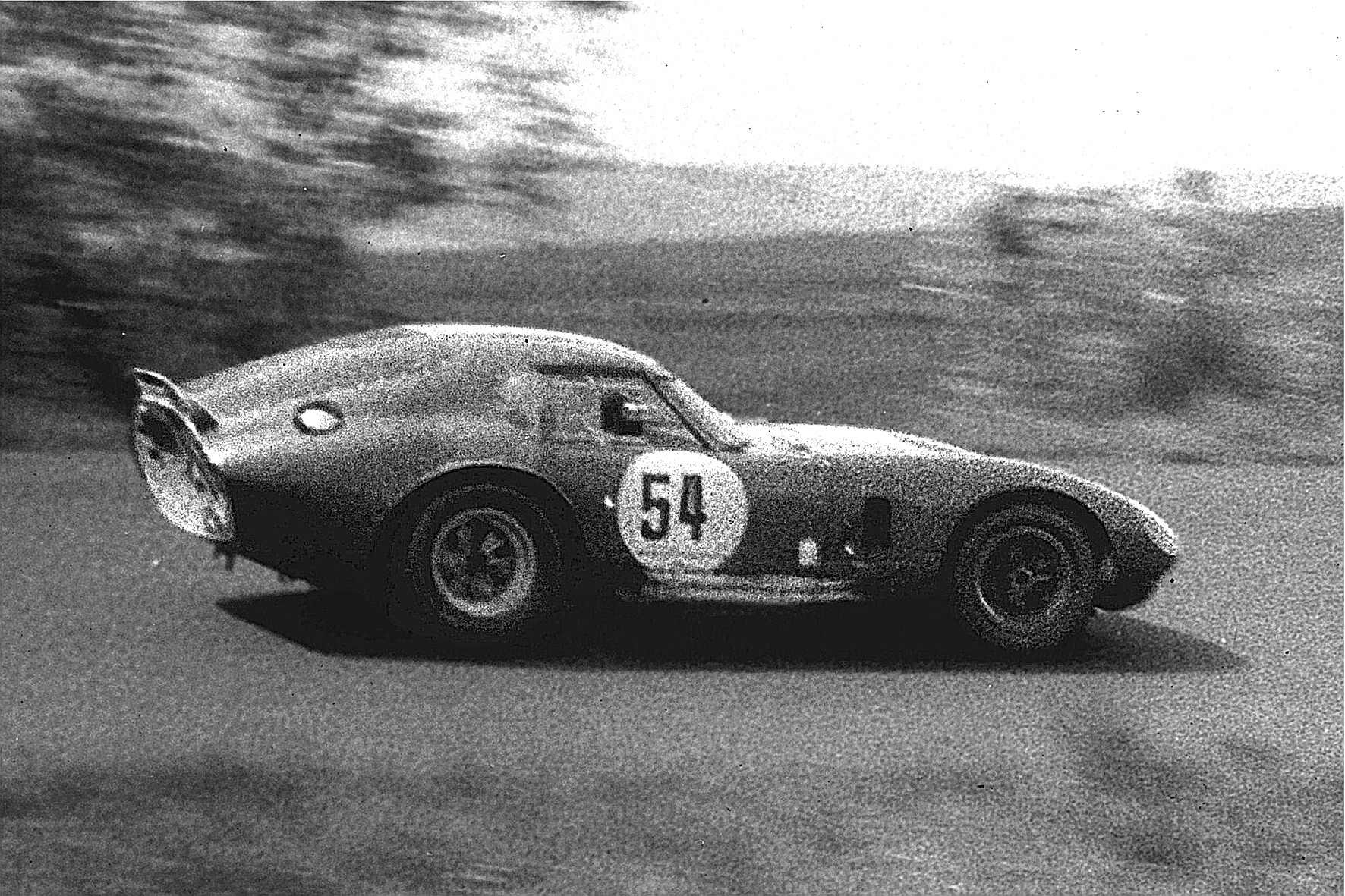
A Shelby Cobra Daytona competing in the 1965 International Championship for GT Manufacturers

The 1965 World Sportscar Championship season was the 13th season of FIA World Sportscar Championship racing. It featured the 1965 International Championship for GT Manufacturers and the 1965 International Trophy for GT Prototypes. The season ran from 28 February 1965 to 19 September 1965 and comprised 20 races.

The International Championship for GT Manufacturers was contested by Grand Touring Cars in three engine capacity divisions. The Over 2000cc division was won by Shelby ahead of Ferrari, while Porsche prevailed in the 2000cc division and Abarth-Simca took the 1300cc division. The International Trophy for GT Prototypes was won by Ferrari, ahead of Porsche and Ford.

== Schedule ==
Although composed of 20 races, each class did not compete in all events. Some events were for one class, while others were combined events.

Rnd	Race	Circuit or Location	Competitors	Date
1	(United States) Continental 2000 km of Daytona	Daytona International Speedway	Both	28 February
2	(United States) 12 Hours of Sebring	Sebring International Raceway	Both	27 March
3	(Italy) Gran Premio Shell Coppa Bologna	Autodromo Dino Ferrari	GT	11 April
4	(Italy) Coppa Inter-Europa	Autodromo Nazionale Monza	GT	25 April
5	(Italy) 1000km Monza	Autodromo Nazionale Monza	Both	25 April
6	(United Kingdom) RAC Senior Service Tourist Trophy	Oulton Park	Both	1 May
7	(Italy) Targa Florio	Circuito delle Madonie	Both	9 May
8	(Belgium) 500km of Spa-Francorchamps	Circuit de Spa-Francorchamps	Both	16 May
9	(Germany) Intl. ADAC 1000 Kilometres Rennen Nürburgring	Nürburgring	Both	23 May
10	(Italy) Mugello 500 km	Mugello Circuit	GT	6 June
11	(Germany) Internationaler Alpen-Bergpreis	Rossfeld road in Berchtesgaden Alps	GT	13 June
12	(France) 24 Hours of Le Mans	Circuit de la Sarthe	Both	19 June; 20 June
13	(France) 12 Hours of Reims	Reims-Gueux	Both	4 July
14	(Italy) Corsa della Mendola	Bolzano	GT	4 July
15	(Germany) Bergpreis Freiburg-Schauinsland	Schauinsland	GT	8 August
16	(Italy) Coppa Citta di Enna	Autodromo di Pergusa	GT	15 August
17	(Switzerland) Grosser Bergpreis der Schweiz	Villars	GT	29 August
18	(Germany) 500 km Nürburgring	Nürburgring	GT	5 September
19	(United States) Double 500 km	Bridgehampton	GT2.0	19 September
20	(United States) Double 500 km	Bridgehampton	Both	19 September

== Results ==
=== Race results ===
Date	Round	Circuit/Location	Winning driver(s)	Winning team	Winning car
28/02	Rd. 1	(United States) Daytona	(United Kingdom) Ken Miles (United States) Lloyd Ruby	Shelby American	Ford GT
27/03	Rd. 2	(United States) Sebring	(United States) Jim Hall (United States) Hap Sharp	Chaparral Cars	Chaparral-Chevrolet 2A
11/04	Rd. 3	(Italy) Imola	(Italy) Herbert Demetz	Abarth	Abarth-Simca 1300 Bialbero
25/04	Rd. 4	(Italy) Monza	(Germany) Klaus Steinmetz	Abarth	Abarth-Simca 1300 Bialbero
25/04	Rd. 5	(Italy) Monza	(United Kingdom) Mike Parkes (France) Jean Guichet	SpA Ferrari SEFAC	Ferrari 275 P2
01/05	Rd. 6	(United Kingdom) Oulton Park	(New Zealand) Denny Hulme	Sidney Taylor Racing	Brabham-Climax BT8
09/05	Rd. 7	(Italy) Targa Florio	(Italy) Nino Vaccarella (Italy) Lorenzo Bandini	SpA Ferrari SEFAC	Ferrari 275 P2
16/05	Rd. 8	(Belgium) Spa-Francorchamps	(Belgium) Willy Mairesse	Ecurie Francorchamps	Ferrari 250 LM
23/05	Rd. 9	(Germany) Nürburgring	(United Kingdom) John Surtees (Italy) Ludovico Scarfiotti	SpA Ferrari SEFAC	Ferrari 330 P2
06/06	Rd. 10	(Italy) Mugello	(Italy) Mario Casoni (Italy) Antonio Nicodemi	Montegrappa	Ferrari 250 LM
13/06	Rd. 11	(Germany) Rossfeld	(Germany) Gerhard Mitter	Porsche System	Porsche 908/4 Bergspyder
19-20/06	Rd. 12	(France) Le Mans	(Austria) Jochen Rindt (United States) Masten Gregory (United States) Ed Hugus	North American Racing Team	Ferrari 250 LM
04/07	Rd. 13	(France) Reims	(Mexico) Pedro Rodríguez (France) Jean Guichet	North American Racing Team	Ferrari 365 P2
04/07	Rd. 14	(Italy) Bolzano	(Italy) Herbert Demetz	Abarth	Abarth-Simca 2000 GT
08/08	Rd. 15	(Germany) Schauinsland	(Italy) Ludovico Scarfiotti	SpA Ferrari SEFAC	Dino 206 SP
15/08	Rd. 16	(Italy) Enna-Pergusa	(Italy) Mario Casoni	Mario Casoni	Ferrari 250 LM
29/08	Rd. 17	(Switzerland) Ollon-Villars	(Italy) Ludovico Scarfiotti	Scuderia Sant Ambroeus	Dino 206 SP
05/09	Rd. 18	(Germany) Nürburgring	(Belgium) Lucien Bianchi (Belgium) Mauro Bianchi	Automobiles Alpine	Alpine-Renault M65
19/09	Rd. 19	(United States) Bridgehampton	(United States) Herb Wetanson	Wetson’s Drive-Ins	Porsche 904 GTS
19/09	Rd. 20	(United States) Bridgehampton	(United States) Hap Sharp	Chaparral Cars	Chaparral-Chevrolet 2A

=== International Championship for GT Manufacturers ===
Position	Manufacturer	Points
	Division 1 : 1300cc	
1	Abarth-Simca	67.5
2	MG	41.5
3	Fiat-Abarth	26.7
4	Alfa Romeo	14.2
5	Alpine	9.7
6	Triumph	9.6
7	Lancia	4.0
	Austin	4.0
9	Lotus	1.0
	Marcos	1.0
	Division 2 : 2000cc	
1	Porsche	96.3
2	Alfa Romeo	45.2
3	MG	19.8
4	Triumph	8.0
5	Abarth-Simca	7.0
6	Lotus	5.8
7	Volvo	3.9
	Division 3 : Over 2000cc	
1	Shelby	90.0
2	Ferrari	71.3
3	Austin-Healey	8.1
4	Jaguar	7.2
5	Chevrolet	2.6
6	Sunbeam	1.6

=== International Trophy for GT Prototypes ===
Position	Manufacturer	Points
1	Ferrari	58.5
2	Porsche	30.4
3	Ford	19.6
4	Iso	3.9
