= 1963 World Sportscar Championship =

Racing tournament

Seasons
- ← 1962 1964 →

The 1963 World Sportscar Championship season was the 11th season of FIA World Sportscar Championship motor racing. It featured the 1963 International Championship for GT Manufacturers, which was contested in three engine capacity divisions and the 1963 International Trophy for GT Prototypes, which was contested in two engine capacity divisions. The season ran from 17 February 1963 to 14 September 1963 over 22 events.

This was the first World Sportscar Championship season to include hillclimb and rally events.

== Schedule ==
Each of the following 22 events counted towards one or more of the FIA titles. All divisions did not compete in all events and some events were open to classes which were not contesting a championship or trophy round.

Event	Event name	Circuit or Location	Date	GT I	GT II	GT III	GTP	Results
1	(United States) Daytona 3 Hours	Daytona International Speedway Road Course	17 February		Rd 1	Rd 1		Report
2	(United States) Sebring 3 Hours	Sebring International Raceway	22 March	Rd 1				Report
3	(United States) 12 Hours of Sebring	Sebring International Raceway	23 March		Rd 2	Rd 2	Rd 1	Report
4	(Italy) Targa Florio	Circuito delle Madonie	5 May		Rd 3	Rd 3	Rd 2	Report
5	(Belgium) Grand Prix Spa 500 Kilometres	Circuit de Spa-Francorchamps	12 May		Rd 4	Rd 4		Report
6	(Italy) Coppa Maifredi	Circuito del Garda	12 May	Rd 2				Report
7	(Germany) 1000km Nürburgring	Nürburgring	19 May		Rd 5	Rd 5	Rd 3	Report
8	(Italy) Coppa della Consuma Hillclimb	Consuma	2 June	Rd 3	Rd 6	Rd 6		Report
9	(Germany) Rossfeld Mountain Grand Prix	Rossfeld	9 June		Rd 7			Report
10	(France) 24 Hours of Le Mans	Circuit de la Sarthe	15 June; 16 June		Rd 8	Rd 7	Rd 4	Report
11	(Italy) Monza 3 Hours	Autodromo Nazionale Monza	29 June	Rd 4				Report
12	(Germany) Wiesbaden-Rallye	Wiesbaden	7 July	Rd 5	Rd 9	Rd 8		Report
13	(France) Trophée d'Auvergne	Charade Circuit	7 July		Rd 10	Rd 9		Report
14	(Germany) Freiburg-Schauinsland Hillclimb	Schauinsland	11 August	Rd 6		Rd 10		Report
15	(Italy) Coppa Citta di Enna	Autodromo di Pergusa	18 August	Rd 7				Report
16	(United Kingdom) RAC Tourist Trophy	Goodwood Circuit	24 August		Rd 11	Rd 11		Report
17	(Switzerland) Ollon-Villars Swiss Mountain Grand Prix	Villars	25 August	Rd 8	Rd 12	Rd 12		Report
18	(Germany) ADAC 500km Rennen Nürburgring	Nürburgring	1 September	Rd 9				Report
19	(Italy) Coppa Inter-Europa (-2.0)	Autodromo Nazionale Monza	8 September		Rd 13			Report
20	(Italy) Coppa Inter-Europa (+2.0)	Autodromo Nazionale Monza	8 September			Rd 13		Report
21	Tour de France		2 September	Rd 10	Rd 14	Rd 14		Report
22	(United States) Double 500 km	Bridgehampton Race Circuit	14 September		Rd 15	Rd 15		Report

== Results – International Championship for GT Manufacturers ==
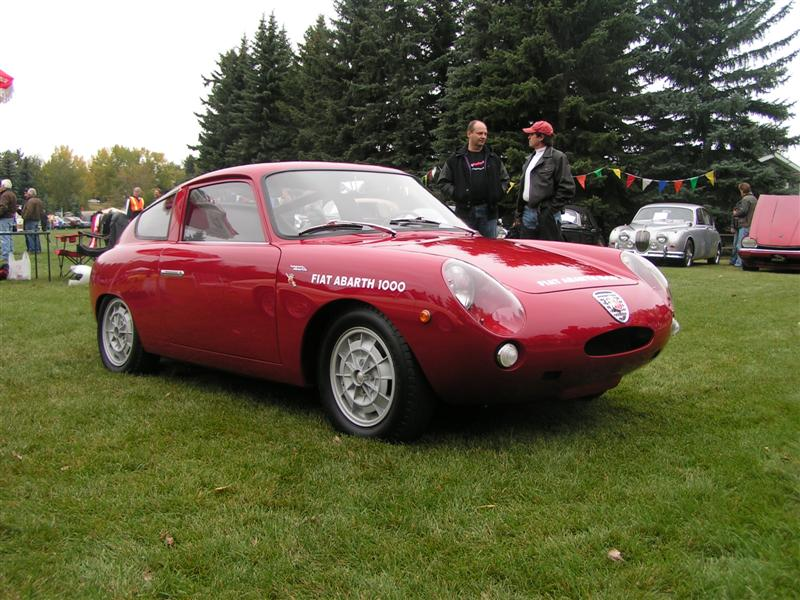
Fiat-Abarth won Division I with the Fiat-Abarth 1000

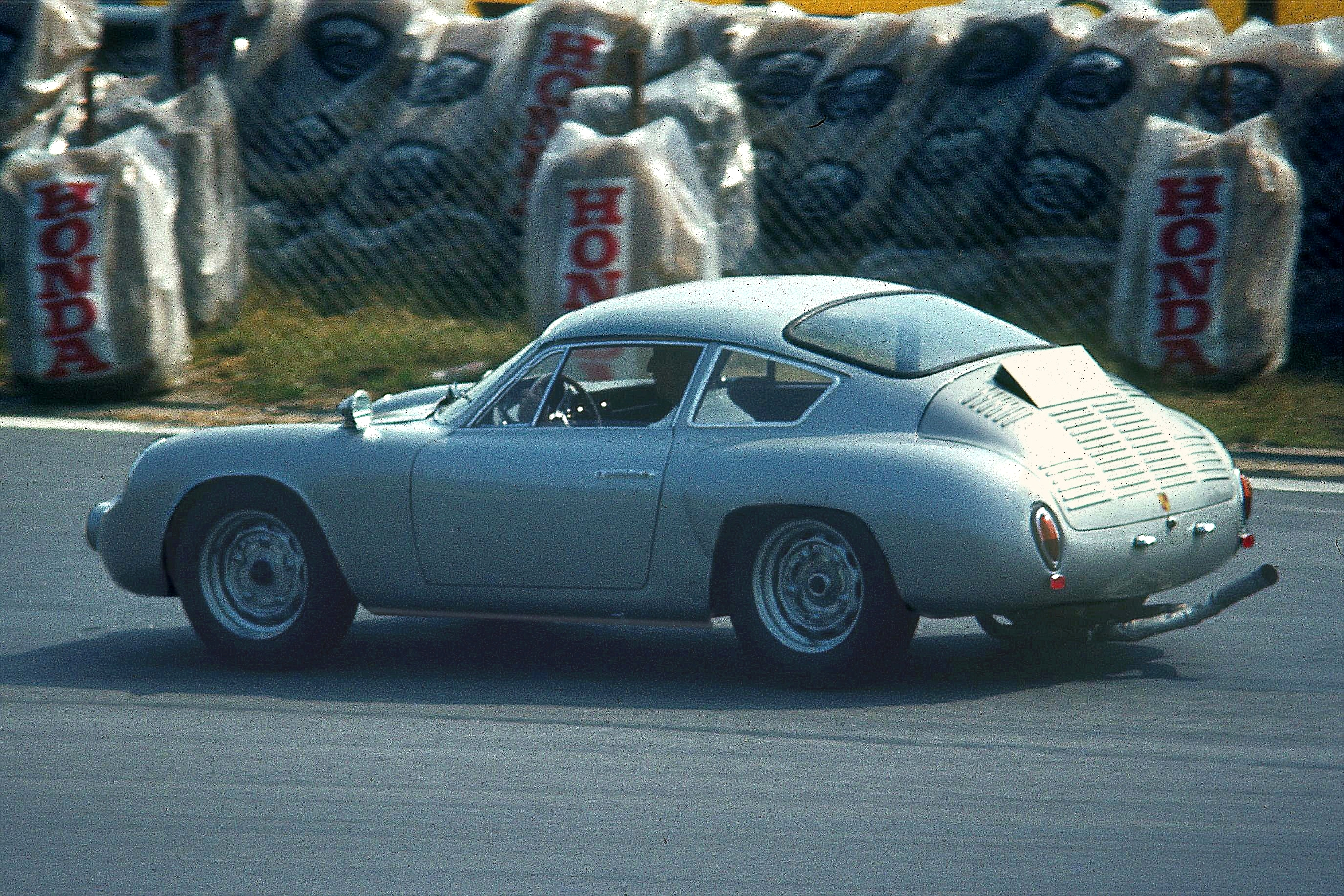
Porsche won Division II with various 356 models such as this 356 B-Carrera GTL-Abarth

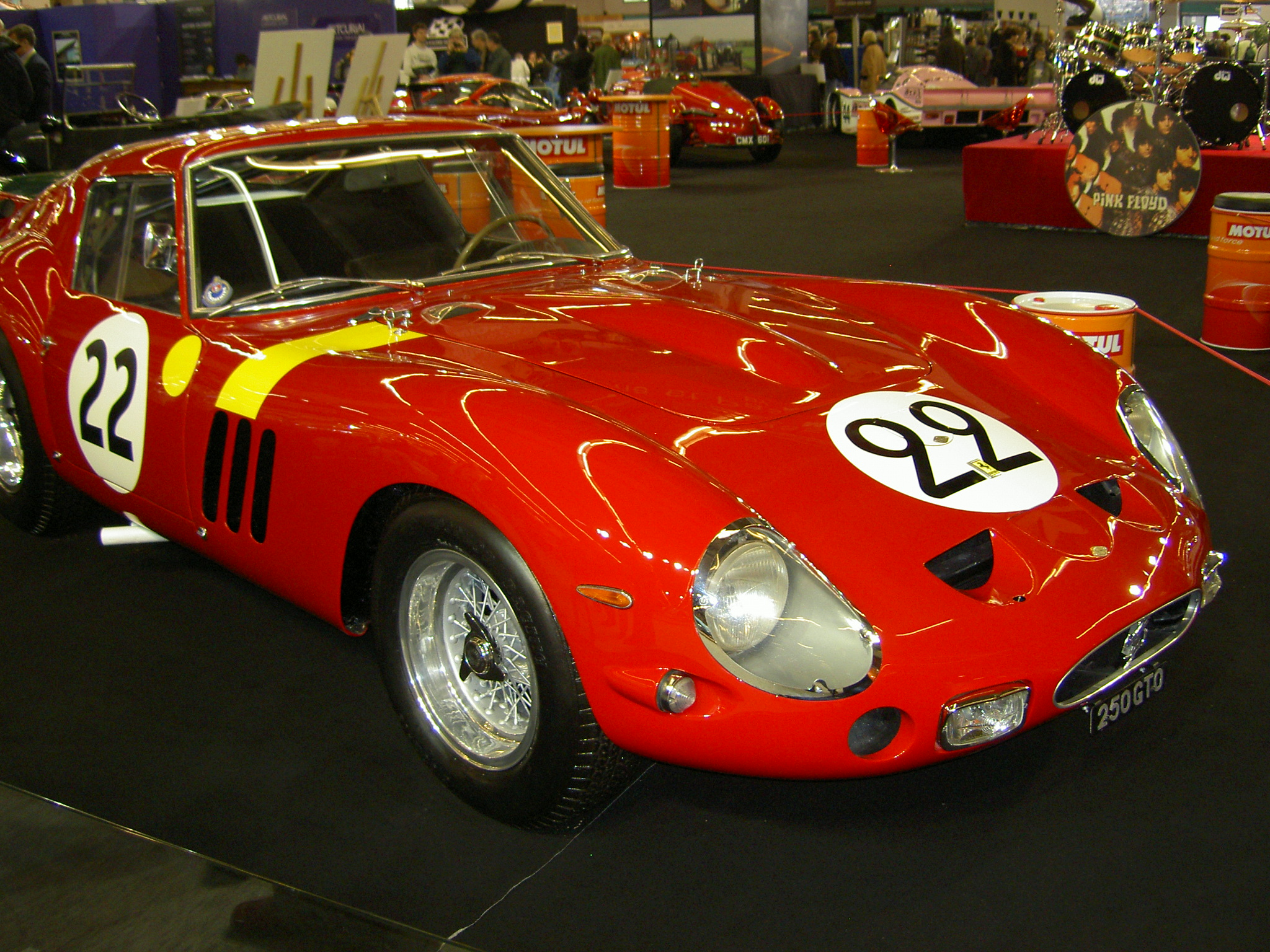
Ferrari won Division III with the GTO

Position	Manufacturer	Points
	Division I (1000cc)	
1	Fiat-Abarth	54
2	Alpine	9
3	Marcos	6
4	MG	4
	DB	4
6	Austin-Healey	3
	Series 1 Subdivision (750cc)	
1	Fiat-Abarth	45
2	NSU	33
3	BMW	18
	Series 2 Subdivision (850cc)	
1	Fiat-Abarth	27
2	Alpine	27
3	DKW	12
4	DB	9
5	René Bonnet	6
	Series 3 Sub-Div (1000cc)	
1	Fiat-Abarth	63
2	Alpine	27
3	Austin-Healey	7
4	Marcos	6
5	MG	4
	Division II (2000cc)	
1	Porsche	90
2	Lotus	52
3	Alfa Romeo	45
4	Abarth-Simca	38
5	MG	36
6	Sunbeam	18
7	Lotus Ford	6
8	Volvo	3
	Series 1 Sub-Div (1300cc)	
1	Alfa Romeo	87
2	Abarth-Simca	72
3	Lotus	63
4	MG	15
5	Volkswagen	12
	Series 2 Sub-Div (1600cc)	
1	Porsche	90
2	Alfa Romeo	49
3	Sunbeam	30
4	O.S.C.A.	15
5	TVR	9
6	Lotus Ford	6
7	MG	3
8	Lotus	1
	Series 3 Sub-Div (2000cc)	
1	Porsche	90
2	MG	54
3	Volvo	18
4	TVR	6
	Morgan	6
6	Turner	4
7	AC	3
	Division III (+2000cc)	
1	Ferrari	126
2	Jaguar	28
3	Shelby	24
4	Austin-Healey	18
5	Aston Martin	13
6	Lancia	10
7	Chevrolet	8
8	Alfa Romeo	3
9	Morgan	1
	Series 1 Sub-Div (2500cc)	
1	Triumph	90
2	Morgan	38
	Lancia	38
	Series 2 Sub-Div (3000cc)	
1	Ferrari	117
2	Austin-Healey	18
	Series 3 Sub-Div (+3000cc)	
1	Jaguar	99
2	Aston Martin	30
3	Shelby	27
	AC	27
5	Chevrolet	26

== Results – International Trophy for GT Prototypes ==
Position	Manufacturer	Points
	Over 3000cc	
1	Ferrari	27
	Under 3000cc	
1	Ferrari	72
2	Porsche	30
3	René Bonnet	19
4	Austin-Healey	16
5	Alpine	6
6	Fiat-Abarth	4
