= Porsche 904 =

Porsche 904 Carrera GTS
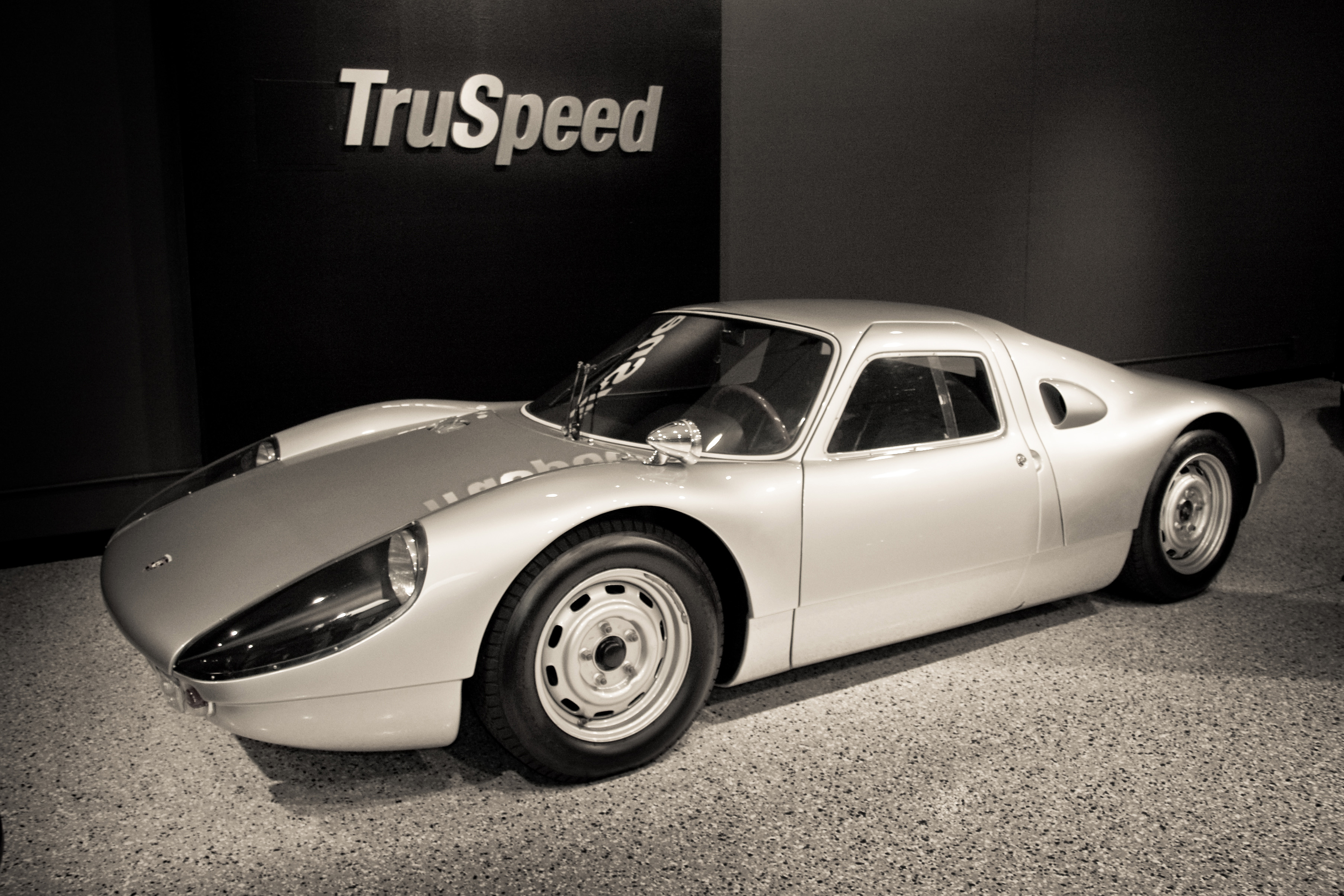
- Porsche 904 Coupé

Overview
- Manufacturer: Porsche
- Also called: Porsche Carrera GTS
- Production: 1964–1965
- Designer: Ferdinand Alexander Porsche, Erwin Komenda

Body and chassis
- Layout: Rear mid-engine, rear-wheel-drive layout

Powertrain
- Engine: 2.0 L F4; 2.0 L F6 (904/6); 2.0 L F8 (904/8)
- Transmission: 5-speed manual

Dimensions
- Wheelbase: 90.5 in (2,300 mm)
- Height: 42 in (1,100 mm)

Chronology
- Predecessor: Porsche 718
- Successor: Porsche 906 Carrera 6

The Porsche 904 Carrera GTS is a GT sportscar which was produced by Porsche in Germany in 1964 and 1965. This coupe, manufactured from 1963 to 1965, was street-legal under road traffic laws, allowing it to be driven not only on race tracks but also on public roads. It was sold as Carrera GTS, not under its internal development code 904, as Peugeot owned rights to such x0y numbers, and the Porsche 901 was renamed Porsche 911, too. The successor Porsche 906 was sold as Carrera 6 as it was road legal, too, while the later pure race cars 907, 908, 909 were not affected.

Over 100 had to be produced to be homologated as Group 3 GT racing car for the 2 litre class. The car was used by the factory team in the Sports Car World Championship from 1964 to 1966. Additionally, numerous private teams raced the Porsche 904 in these international series as well as in national championships, such as the German Automobile Circuit Championship, specifically in the 2-liter GT class.

The Porsche 904 achieved significant success, winning the 2-liter GT category in the Manufacturer's World Championship in 1964 and 1965, and it also won the prototype class in 1964.

== History ==
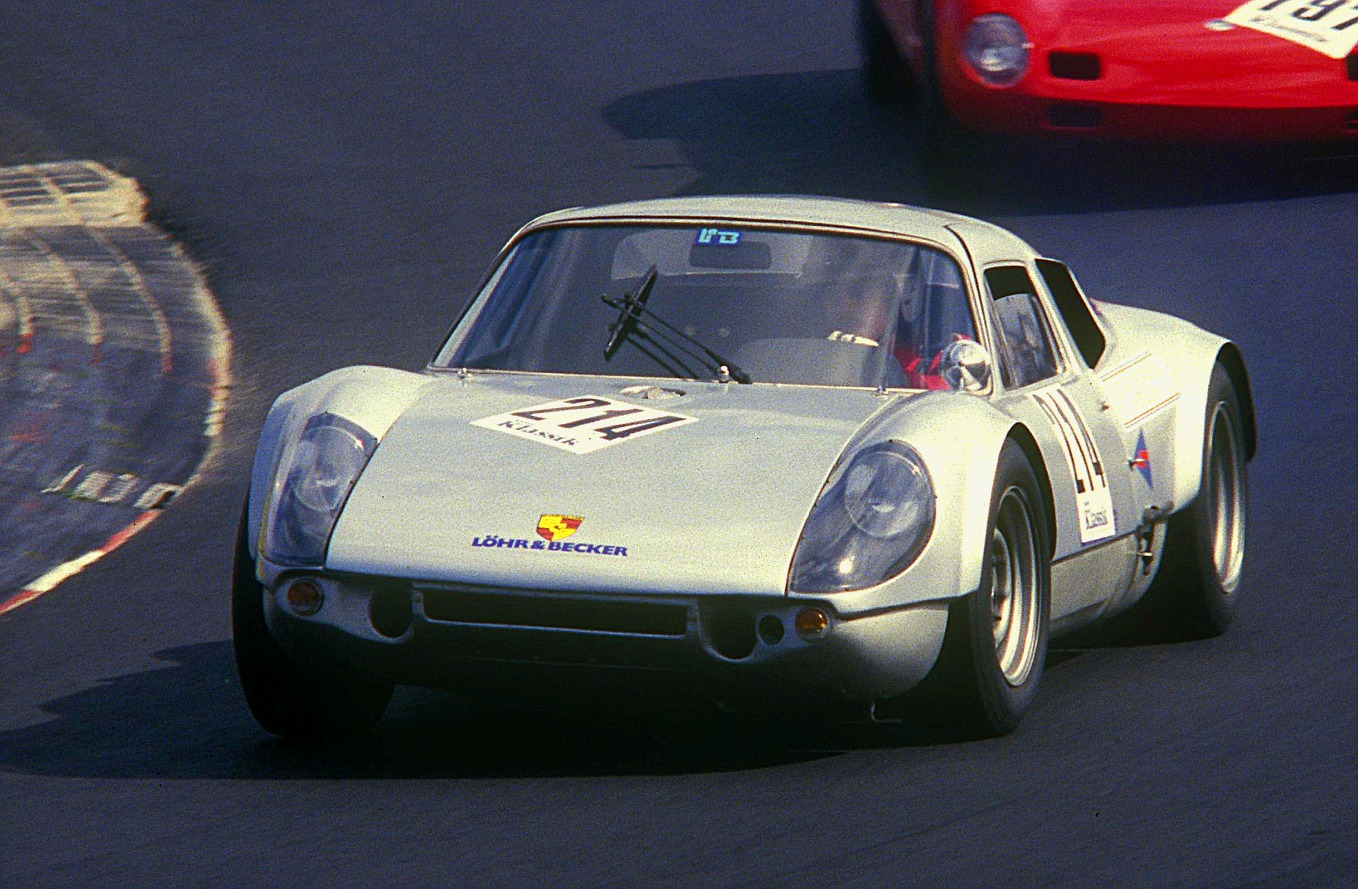
Porsche 904-6

After having withdrawn from Formula One at the end of the 1962 season, Porsche focused again on sportscar racing. The 904 debuted late in 1963, for the 1964 racing season, as a successor to the 718, which had been introduced in 1957. Porsche designed the GTS variant to compete in the FIA-GT class at various international racing events. The street-legal version debuted in 1964 in order to comply with group 3 appendix J homologation regulations requiring a minimum of 100 road-going variants be sold by the factory. Porsche produced one-hundred and six 904s at four or five a day with a list price of US$7245 (FOB Stuttgart). Orders far exceeded the one hundred car requirement to satisfy homologation rules and more cars could have been sold. The 904 marked the beginning of a series of sportscars that culminated in the dominant 917.

=== 904 Coupé (1963–1964) ===
==== Engine ====
The 904's mid-engine layout was inherited from the 718RSK series (RennSport = racing, K referring to the torsion bar suspension shape), the factory's leading race car. It was powered by the 1,966 cc (120 cu in) Type 587/3, four-cam flat four-cylinder engine producing 180 hp, "probably the most complex four-cylinder" ever. It drove a five-speed transmission with a standard 4.428:1 final drive, with available 4.605, 4.260, 3.636, and 3.362 ratios.

Begun as the Type 547, its development began in 1953, when the previous VW-based 1,100 cc (67 cu in) flat-four, used in the contemporary 356 and rated at 38 hp (28 kW), hit the limit of its potential. Porsche realized it needed something all-new. The brainchild of Ernst Fuhrmann, later technical director, it was hoped to achieve an "unheard of" 70 hp (52 kW) per 1 L (61 cu in), relying on hemispherical combustion chambers and 46 mm (1.8 in)-throat 46IDA2 two-choke Weber carburetors to generate 112 hp (84 kW) from the 1,500 cc (92 cu in) four-cam engine. The 1.5 liter weighed 310 lb (140 kg) dry, eventually producing 180 hp (134 kW). A complex design that proved "very taxing" to build and assemble, but very durable, it was used in 34 different models, including 550 spyders, 356 Carreras, and F2/1s.

==== Chassis ====
The 904 was the first Porsche to use a ladder chassis and fibreglass body, appearing more like a specialist racing car than the modified sports cars typical at the time, and was painted white. The fibreglass body was bonded to its steel chassis for extra rigidity, and achieved a drag coefficient of 0.34. While many German race cars had used unpainted aluminium bodies since the famous 1934 Silver Arrows, most 904s were painted silver, the modern German national racing color. Unusually for Porsche, the two-seater bodies were provided by contractors, which would later become standard practice among race car builders. The 904's fibreglass body was made by spraying chopped fibreglass into a mold, the amount sprayed often varied in thickness over the shape of the car and as a result the weight of the various cars was somewhat inconsistent. Race-prepared four-cylinder 904s weighed in at approximately 1,443 pounds (655 kg) and the low weight gave the 904 the ability to accelerate to 60 mph (97 km/h) from a standstill in less than six seconds (using the standard rear gear, which was typical at Sebring) and to reach a top speed of 160 mph (260 km/h) (with the 3.362 ratio). Frontal area was only 14 sq ft (1.3 m^{2}).

==== Suspension ====
The Porsche 904 rode on coil springs (the first Porsche not to use trailing arm front and swing axle rear suspension), with unequal-length A-arms in front. The wheelbase was 90.5 in (2,300 mm), track front and rear 51.7 in (1,310 mm), height 42 in (1,100 mm), and ground clearance of 4.7 in (120 mm) on 15 in (380 mm) wheels. Brakes were 275 mm (10.8 in) discs at the front and 285 mm (11.2 in) at the rear.

==== 904/6 ====
To satisfy demand, forty 1965 models were produced, some featuring a variant of the 911's flat-six. Due to the weight issues of the first generation plastic body, the 904's successor, the 1966 906 or "Carrera 6", was developed with a tubular space frame covered with an unstressed, lighter fiberglass body.

==== 904/8 ====
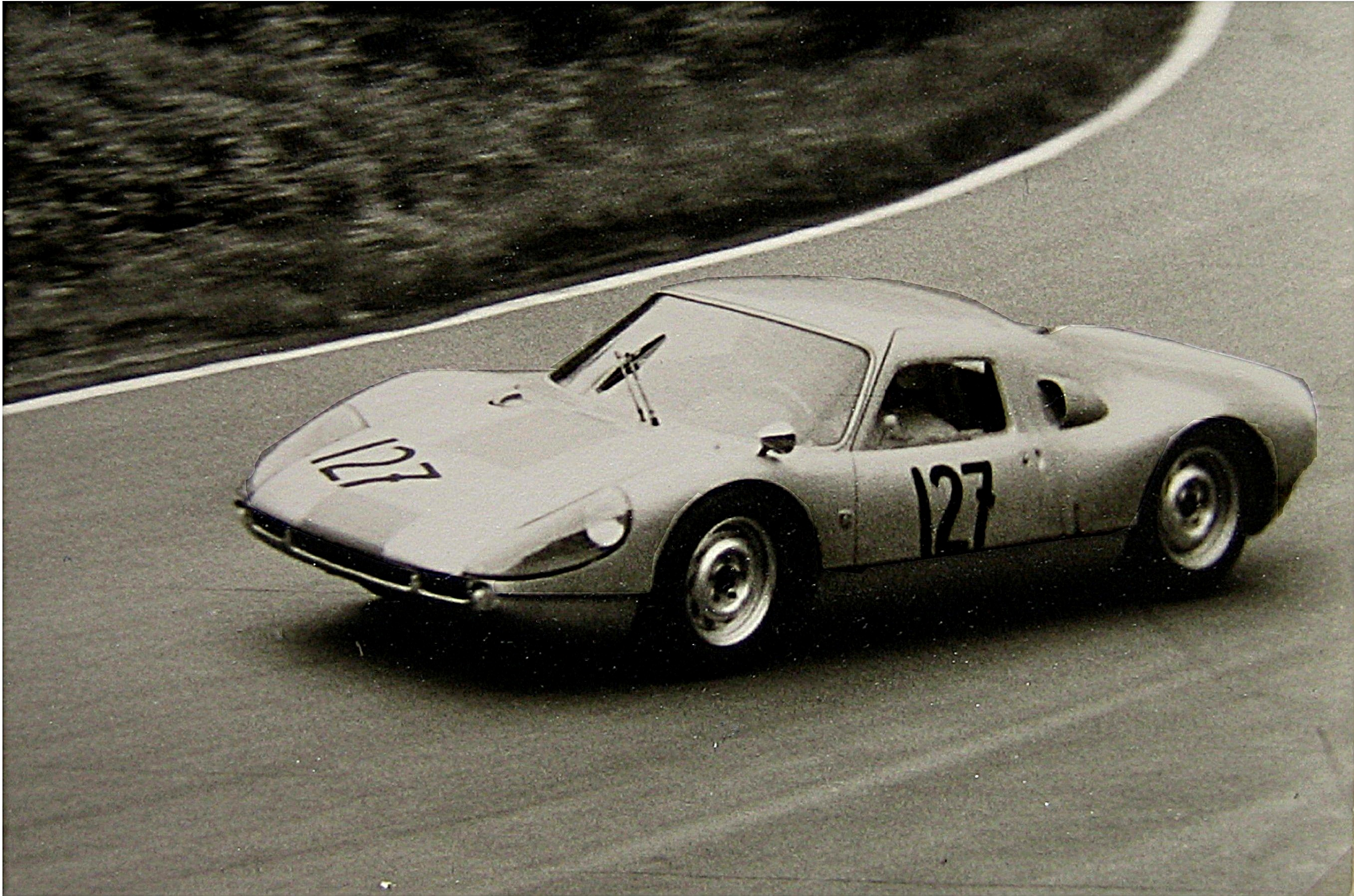
Porsche 904/8 during practice for the 1,000km race at the Nürburgring in 1964.

A few factory race cars were fitted with a flat eight-cylinder power plant derived from the 1962 804 F1 car, the 225 hp (168 kW) 1,962 cc (119.7 cu in) Type 771, which used 42 mm (1.7 in)-throat downdraft Weber carburetors. The Type 771s, however, suffered a "disturbing habit" of making their flywheels explode.

=== 904 Bergspyder (1965) ===
==== Body ====
For the European Hill Climb Championship in 1965, Porsche developed a successor to the 1964 Porsche 718 RS 61 Spyder. The 904 Bergspyder, based on the Coupé 904/8, was given chassis numbers that began with the 906. Therefore, the car is also sometimes called the 906/8 Bergspyder, Although the race car was most commonly known as the 904 Bergspyder and was technically based on the 904 coupé.

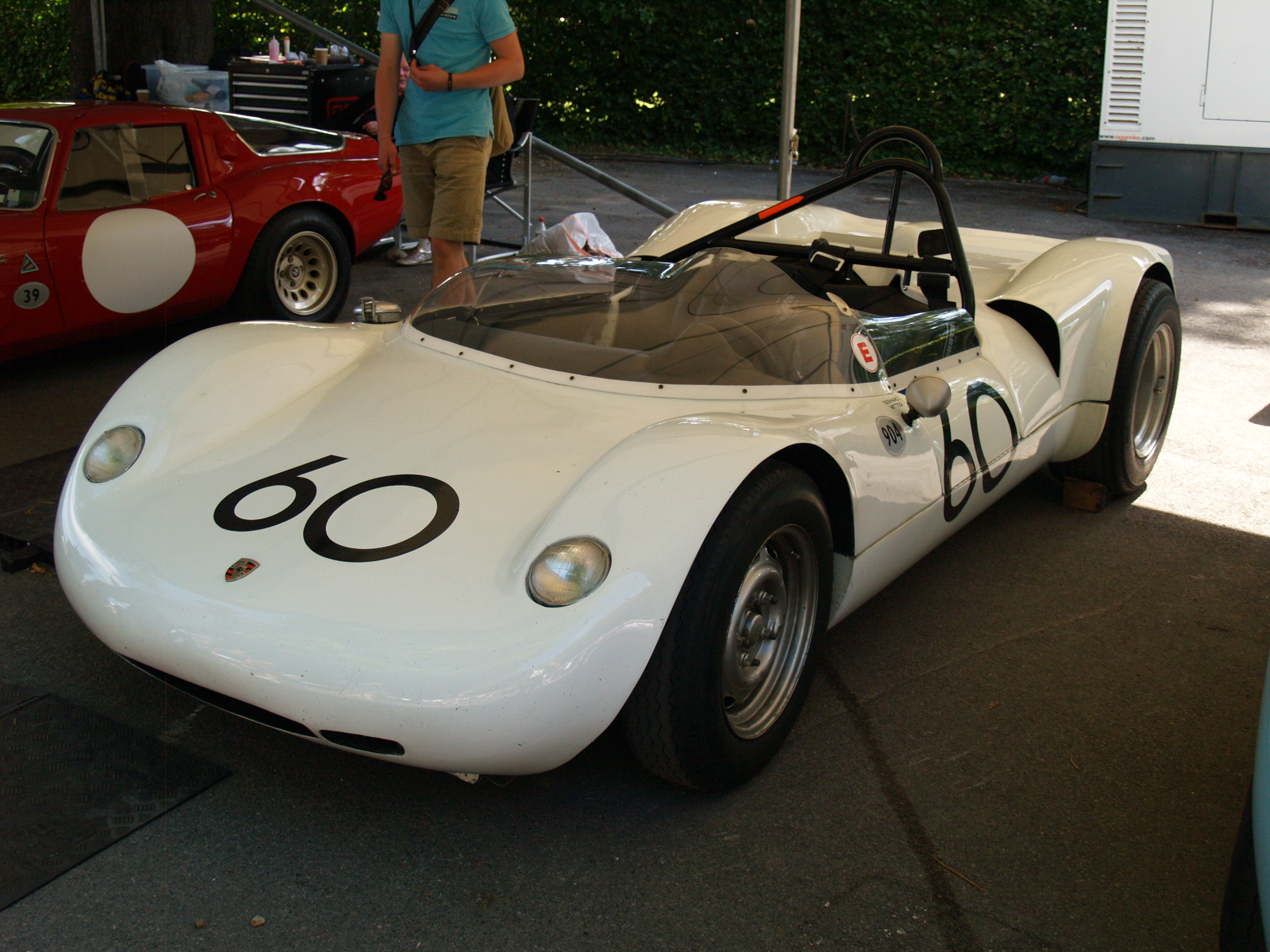
Porsche 904 Bergspyder (1965)

From the coupé, the developers carried over the steel box frame and put on a light open plastic body. The Bergspyder was not a beauty and visually showed no relationship to the aerodynamic coupé. The car was flat especially shorter at the front and because of the missing roof and the shorter windshield as the series 904. However, this made the car around 120 kg lighter than the coupé, with a weight of 570 kg.

During the European Championship season 1965, the body was changed several times. For example, the windshield on model number 906 004 was shortened and flattened. Later, the Bergspyder received again a lighter and rounded at the front and aerodynamically improved car body.

A total of five copies were produced, of which three were destroyed in accidents. In the European Hill Climb Championship, Gerhard Mitter piloted the Bergspyder to an overall victory at the hill climb Rossfeld in 1965. The 904 Bergspyder was replaced at the end of 1965 at the hill climb Ollon-Villars by the Porsche 906 Spyder Mountain.

==== Suspension ====
The chassis and suspension were taken over without major changes from the 904 coupé. Due to the low weight and the unadjusted suspension of the 904, the Bergspyder was very difficult to drive.

==== Engine and transmission ====
The Bergspyder is powered by the air-cooled 2-liter eight-cylinder boxer engine used in the type 771. This engine had its first use in 1962 in the Porsche 718 RS 61 [21] and already had a Bosch injection system for mixture preparation. The valves were operated by two overhead camshafts with vertical shaft drive. The engine delivered up to 191 kW (260 hp) at 8,800 rpm and had a compression ratio of 10.5: 1. The car had a top speed of around 260 km/h (161 mph).

== Technical specifications ==
- Engine (904 Coupé)
  - Drivetrain layout: mid-engine RWD
  - Engine type: flat-four
  - Bore × stroke: 3.62 in (91.95 mm) × 2.91 in (73.91 mm)
  - Displacement, ci/cc: 120/1966
  - Compression ratio: 9.8:1
  - Max SAE net horsepower: 198 hp (148 kW)
  - Specific output, hp per liter: 100.7
  - Weight to power, lbs per hp: 5.4
  - Transmission: five-speed manual

=== Performance ===
- Drag coefficient: 0.34
- 0–60 mph (97 km/h): <6 seconds
- Top speed: 160 mph (260 km/h)

== Modern day replicas ==
Modern day replicas of the 904 are currently being produced by Chuck Beck in the US.

== Racing ==
Making an inauspicious debut at Sebring in 1964, where it suffered clutch trouble, "a four-cylinder 904 took an astounding first overall" at the Targa Florio. It went on to a third at the Nürburgring and a perfect finish at Le Mans. Both times, all five starters finished, placed in the top twelve overall, among many much more powerful cars. 904s showed remarkable durability; they "almost always" finished, and at Reims in 1964, a customer car fresh from Stuttgart, driven to the track, went on to win without the need for any spares at all. For 1964, 904s racked up a 1–2 at the Targa Florio and class wins at Spa, Sebring (co-driven by Briggs Cunningham and Lake Underwood), the Nürburgring, Le Mans, Watkins Glen, Zandvoort, Canada, and the Paris 1000 Kilometer, in the process taking SCCA's C-Production and E-Sports Racing titles. In addition, it won rally events including the Tulip, Munich-Vienna-Budapest, Geneva, and "highly acclaimed" Alpine Rally. For 1965, results were "equally impressive", seeing wins at the Spanish, Rossfeld, Hellbronner, and Gaisburg rallies, as well as a class win and second overall in the Monte Carlo Rally which saw just 22 finishers in the points, out of 237 starters. In addition, 904s won their class at the Monza 1000 Kilometer, Targa, Spa, Daytona Continental, Le Mans, and Zandvoort, among others, repeating their E-Sports title win and adding an SCCA E-Production championship.
