= 1964 World Sportscar Championship =

Racing tournament

Seasons
- ← 1963 1965 →

The 1964 World Sportscar Championship season was the 12th season of FIA 'World Sportscar Championship' motor racing. It featured the 1964 International Championship for GT Manufacturers which was open to Group 3 GT cars and was contested from 16 February 1964 to 11 October 1964 over a twenty race series. Titles were awarded in three engine capacity divisions:

- Division I – Under 1300cc
- Division II – Under 2000cc
- Division III – Over 2000cc

The season also included the 1964 International Prototype Trophy which was open to Prototype cars and was contested over four of the twenty championship races. Titles were awarded to those that were:

- Outright
- Under 3000cc

== Schedule ==
The twenty championship races each counted towards one or more of the five FIA Titles, as shown below. A points coefficient multiplication factor was applied for each race to the determine the number of championship points to be awarded.

Race	Race name	Circuit or Location	Date	GTI	GTII	GTIII	Prot.	Points Coefficient	Results
1	(United States) 2000 km of Daytona	Daytona International Speedway Road Course	16 February	-	Rd 1	Rd 1	-	1.3	Report
2	(United States) 12 Hours of Sebring	Sebring International Raceway	21 March	Rd 1	Rd 2	Rd 2	Rd 1	1.6	Report
3	(Italy) Targa Florio	Circuito delle Madonie	26 April	-	Rd 3	Rd 3	Rd 2	1.6	Report
4	(Italy) Monza 3 Hours	Autodromo Nazionale Monza	3 May	Rd 2	-	-	-	1.3	Report
5	(Belgium) 500 km of Spa	Circuit de Spa-Francorchamps	17 May	-	Rd 4	Rd 4	-	1.3	Report
6	(Italy) La Consuma Hillclimb	Consuma	24 May	Rd 3	-	-	-	1.0	Report
7	(Germany) ADAC 1000km Rennen Nürburgring	Nürburgring	31 May	Rd 4	Rd 5	Rd 5	Rd 3	1.6	Report
8	(Germany) Alpenbergpreis Rossfeld	Rossfeld	7 June	Rd 5	-	-	-	1.0	Report
9	(France) 24 Hours of Le Mans	Circuit de la Sarthe	20–21 June	-	Rd 6	Rd 6	Rd 4	2.0	Report
10	(France) International 12 Hours of Reims	Reims-Gueux	5 July	-	Rd 7	Rd 7	-	1.0	Report
11	(Germany) Grosser Bergpreis Freiburg-Schauinsland	Schauinsland	9 August	-	Rd 8	Rd 8	-	1.0	Report
12	(Italy) Coppa Citta di Enna	Autodromo di Pergusa	16 August	-	Rd 9	-	-	1.3	Report
13	(United Kingdom) RAC Gallaghers Tourist Trophy	Goodwood Circuit	29 August	-	-	Rd 9	-	1.3	Report
14	(Switzerland) Grosser Bergerpreis Sierre Crans-Montana	Crans-Montana	30 August	Rd 6	Rd 10	Rd 10	-	1.0	Report
15	(Germany) 500 km Nürburgring	Nürburgring	6 September	Rd 7	-	-	-	1.0	Report
16	(Italy) Coppa Inter-Europa	Autodromo Nazionale Monza	6 September	-	Rd 11	-	-	1.3	Report
17	(United States) Double 500 km	Bridgehampton Race Circuit	19 September	Rd 8	Rd 12	Rd 11	-	1.6	Report
18	(United States) Double 500 km	Bridgehampton Race Circuit	20 September	Rd 9	Rd 13	-	-	1.3	Report
19	Tour de France		11–20 September	-	-	Rd 12	-	1.3	Report
20	(France) 1000 km of Paris	Autodrome de Montlhéry	11 October	Rd 10	Rd 14	-	-	1.6	Report

== Points system ==
=== International Championship for GT Manufacturers ===
- Points were awarded to the top six positions in each division in each race on a 9-6-4-3-2-1 basis with the relevant points coefficient applied (see Schedule above).
- Points were awarded only for the position gained by the best placed car from each manufacturer in each division at each race.
- Only the best six race results plus one hillclimb result were retained towards the final classification.
- Manufacturers had to enter at least six races and one hillclimb to be eligible for championship classification.

=== International Prototypes Trophy ===
- Points were awarded to the top six positions outright and in the Under 3000cc division in each race on a 9-6-4-3-2-1 basis with the relevant points coefficient applied (see Schedule above).
- Points were awarded only for the position gained by the best placed car from each manufacturer at each race.
- All points were retained towards the final classification.
- Manufacturers had to enter all four Trophy races to be eligible for championship classification.

== Results ==
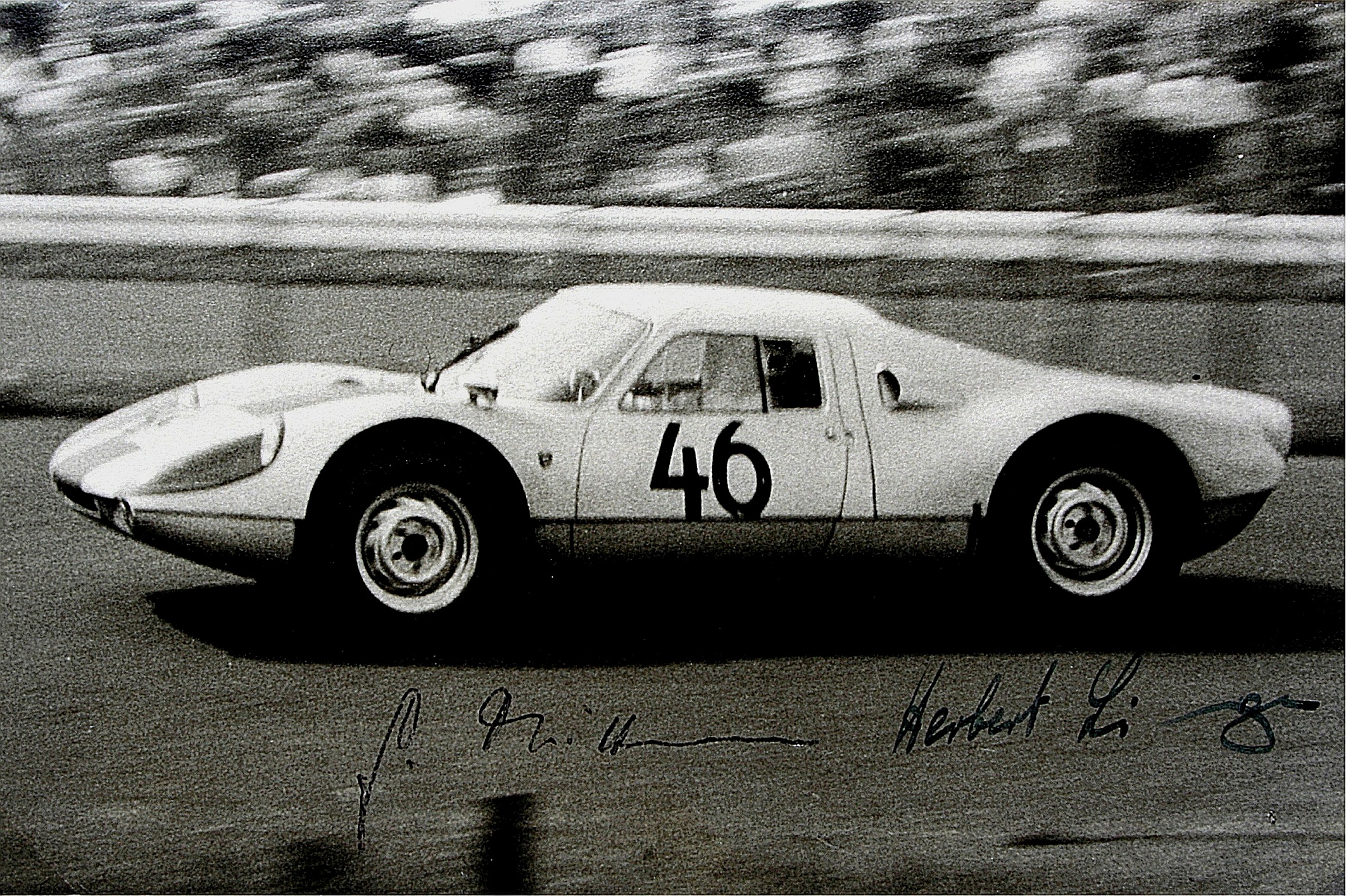
Porsche won the GT Division II title with the 904 GTS

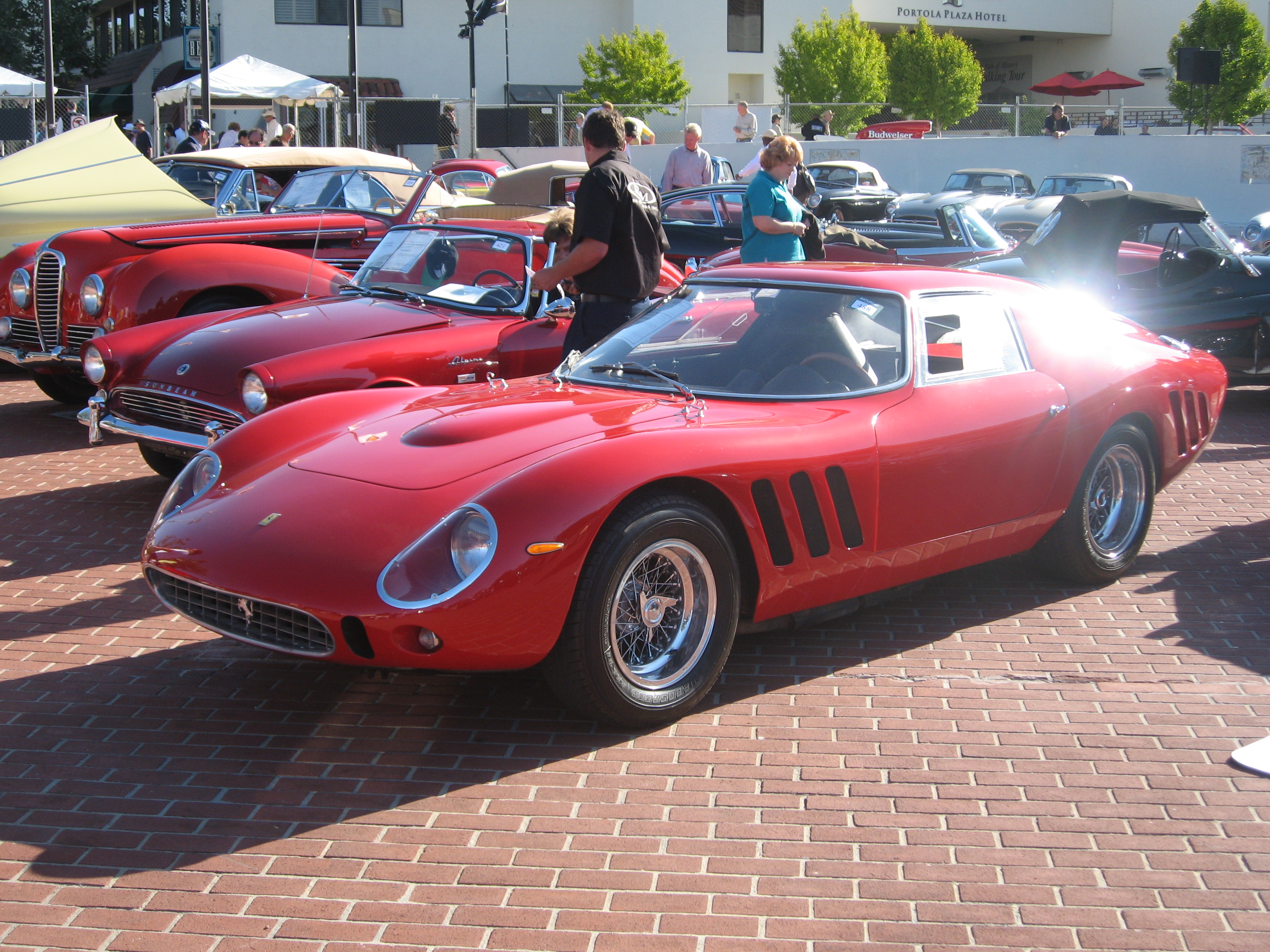
Ferrari won the GT Division III title with the 250 GTO

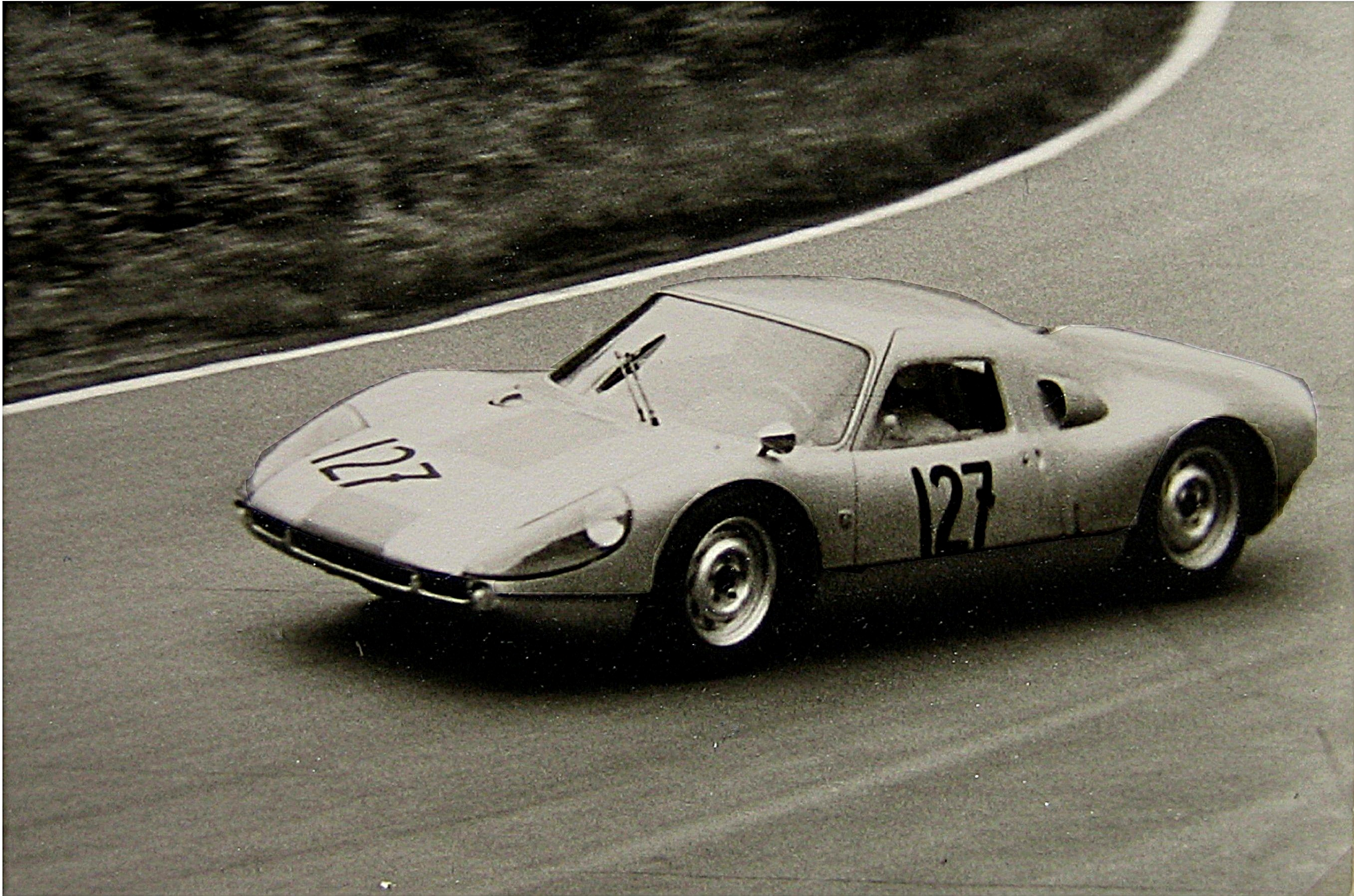
Porsche won the Prototype Trophy with the 904

=== International Championship for GT Manufacturers ===
==== Division I (1300 cc) ====
Pos	Manufacturer	(United States) SEB	(Italy) MZA1	(Italy) CSU	(West Germany) NÜR1	(West Germany) FRI	(Switzerland) CRA	(West Germany) NÜR2	(United States) BHP1	(United States) BHP2	(France) MTY	Total
1	Abarth-Simca	14,4	11,7	9	14,4	(9)	(9)	9			14,4	59,9
2	Triumph						3		14,4		6,4	24
3	Alpine								6,4	7,8		14,4
4	Lotus	4,8	3,9			4						12,7
5	Fiat-Abarth		2,6			6	(1)	2				10,6
6	Alfa Romeo								9,6	11,7		11,7
7	René Bonnet	9,6										9,6
8	Austin-Healey									5,2		5,2
9=	NSU								4,8			4,8
9=	Glas				4,8			3				4,8
11	Honda							4				4
12	Marcos							1				1

==== Division II (2000 cc) ====
Pos	Manufacturer	(United States) DAY	(United States) SEB	(Italy) TGA	(Belgium) SPA	(West Germany) NÜR1	(West Germany) ROS	(France) LMS	(France) REI	(Italy) PER	(Switzerland) CRA	(Italy) MZA2	(United States) BHP1	(United States) BHP2	(France) MTY	Total
1	Porsche	(11,7)	14,4	14,4	(11,7)	14,4	9	18	(9)	(1,3)	(4)	(11,7)	14,4	(11,7)	14,4	99
2	Alfa Romeo		6,4	6,4				4		(2,6)		(1,3)	3,2	5,2	4,8	30
3	Abarth-Simca				2,6		(1)			11,7	9		3,9			26,2
4	MG		4,8													4,8
5	Lotus-Ford		3,2													3,2
6=	Volvo												2,6			2,6
6=	Sunbeam	2,6														2,6
8	Lotus												1,6			1,6

==== Division III (+2000 cc) ====
Pos	Manufacturer	(United States) DAY	(United States) SEB	(Italy) TGA	(Belgium) SPA	(West Germany) NÜR1	(France) LMS	(France) REI	(West Germany) SCH	(United Kingdom) GWD	(Switzerland) CRA	(United States) BHP1	(France) TDF	Total
1	Ferrari	11,7	(4,8)	14,4	11,7	14,4	12	(9)	6	(3,9)	(3)	14,4		84,6
2	Shelby	3,9	14,4	9,6	(1,3)	(1,6)	18		9	11,7	(9)		11,7	78,3
3	Jaguar							4		2,6				6,6
4	A.C.						4							4
5	Lancia													1,6

Note: Some manufacturers (other than the three Division winners) may have been ineligible for championship classification under the minimum race participation regulation.

=== International Prototypes Trophy ===
Pos	Manufacturer	(United States) SEB	(Italy) TGA	(West Germany) NÜR1	(France) LMS	Total
1	Porsche	4,8	14,4	9,6	6	34,8
2	Alpine		9,6			9,6
3	Austin-Healey			1,6		1,6

Note:

- Ferrari scored 46.8 points but was deemed ineligible for classification as it had not contested the Prototype category at all four races.
- Iso, MG & Chevrolet also scored points but were ineligible for classification for the same reason.

==== 3000 cc ====
Pos	Manufacturer	(United States) SEB	(Italy) TGA	(West Germany) NÜR1	(France) LMS	Total
1	Porsche	14,4	14,4	14,4	18	62,4
2	Alpine	3,2	9,6		12	24,8
3	Austin-Healey	4,8		4,8	4	11,6

Note:

- MG, Rene Bonnet, Triumph, Diva, Martini & Volvo all scored points but were deemed ineligible for classification as they had not contested the Prototype category at all four races.
