= World Sportscar Championship =

Endurance auto racing series

- Final logo used from 1991 until series' discontinuation
- Category: Sports car racing
- Country: International
- Inaugural season: 1953
- Folded: 1992
- Classes: Multi class championship
- Last Drivers' champion: (France) Yannick Dalmas (United Kingdom) Derek Warwick
- Last Teams' champion: (France) Peugeot Talbot Sport

The World Sportscar Championship was the world endurance racing series run for sports car racing, sanctioned by the Fédération Internationale de l'Automobile (FIA), from 1953 to 1992. The championship evolved from a small collection of the most important sportscar, endurance, and road racing events in Europe and North America with dozens of gentleman drivers at the grid to a professional racing series where the world's largest automakers spent millions of dollars per year.

The official name of the series frequently changed throughout the years but was generally known as the World Sportscar Championship from its inception in 1953. Alongside the Formula One World Championship, it was one of the two major World Championships in circuit motor racing. The championship was revived in the 2012 season under the new name as the FIA World Endurance Championship.

== Official names ==
The series was known under different names throughout the years:

- 1953–1961: World Sportscar Championship (for sports prototypes).
- 1962–1965: International Championship for GT Manufacturers (for Grand Touring (GT) cars).
  - Title awarded to sports prototypes was known only as a Coupe des Sports (in 1962) and as an International Prototype Trophy (1963–1965).
- 1966–1967: International Manufacturers Championship (for sports prototypes); International Sports Car Championship (for GT cars).
- 1968–1971: International Championship for Makes (for sports prototypes); International Grand Touring Trophy (for GT cars).
- 1972–1975: World Championship for Makes (for sports prototypes); International Grand Touring Trophy (for GT cars).
- 1976–1977: World Sports Car Championship (for sports prototypes); World Championship for Makes (for Group 5 Special Production Cars).
- 1978–1981: World Championship for Makes (for Group 5 Special Production Cars).
- 1982–1985: World Endurance Championship (for sports prototypes and, from 1983 to 1984, also for GT cars).
- 1986–1990: World Sports Prototype Championship (for sports prototypes).
- 1991–1992: Sportscar World Championship (for sports prototypes).

Titles were given to manufacturers from 1953 to 1984 and to teams from 1985 to 1992.

== Races ==
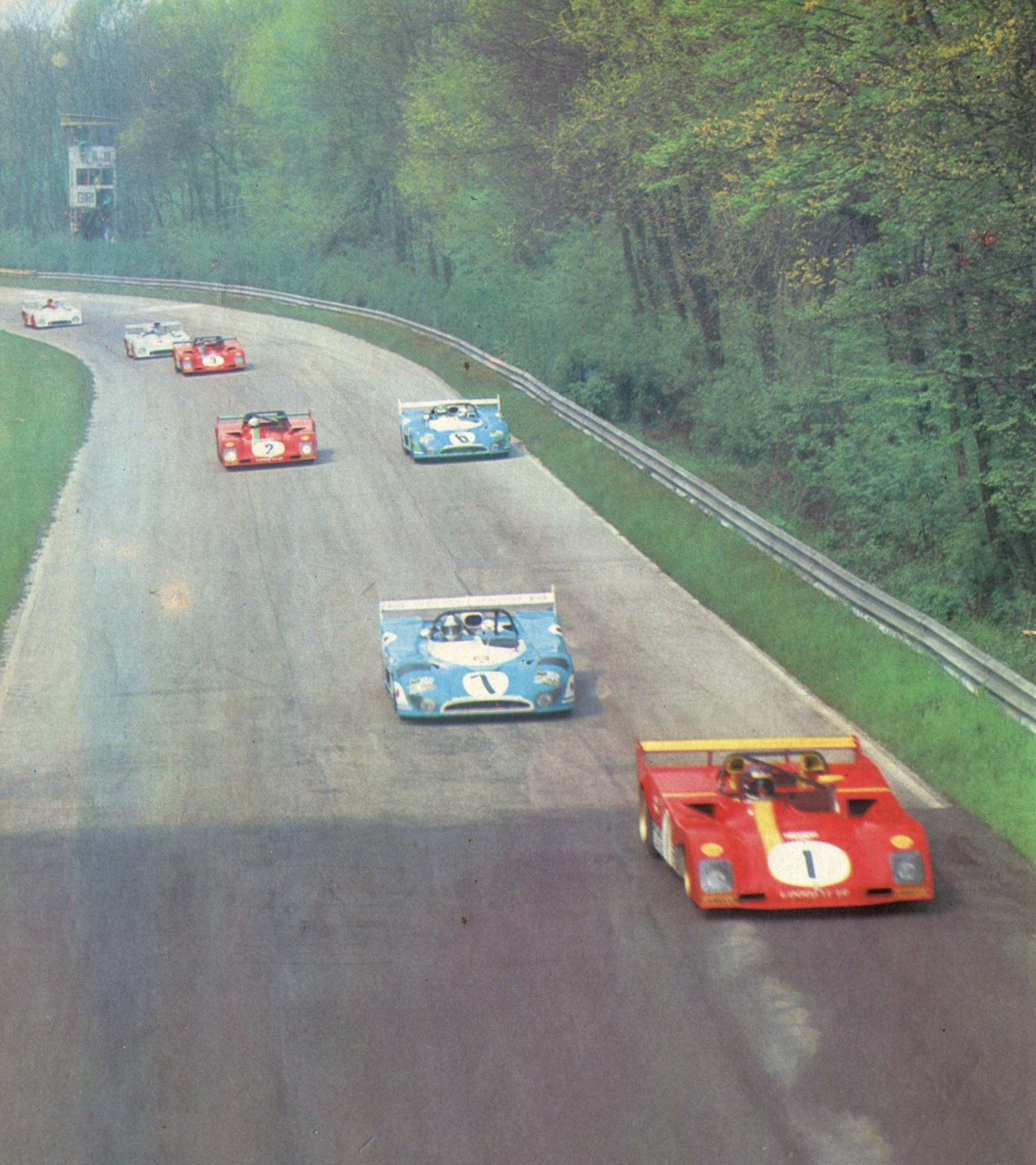
A group of sportscar competitors at Monza for the 1973 World Championship for Makes

The most famous event was the 24 Hours of Le Mans which was the part of the championship in every season except of the 1956, 1975–79 and 1989–90 seasons. The 24 Hours of Daytona followed near-continuous inclusion on the World Sportscar Championship. In 1982, the race was dropped as the series attempted to cut costs by both keeping teams in Europe and running shorter races. Among others, the following races also counted towards the championships in certain years:

- Mille Miglia 1953–57
- 1000 km Nürburgring 1953–
- RAC Tourist Trophy 1953–64
- 12 Hours of Sebring 1953–
- Carrera Panamericana 1953–54
- Targa Florio 1955–73
- 1000 km Monza 1963–2008
- 1000 km Spa 1963–
- 12 Hours of Reims 1964–65
- 1000 km Buenos Aires 1954–72
- 1000 km Zeltweg 1966–76
- 1000 km Fuji 1983–88
- Norisring 200 Miles 1984–88
- Watkins Glen 6 Hours 1968–71, 1973–80

== History ==
=== 1953 to 1961 ===
In the early years, now legendary races such as the Mille Miglia, Carrera Panamericana and Targa Florio were part of the calendar, alongside the 24 Hours of Le Mans, the 12 Hours of Sebring, the Tourist Trophy and Nurburgring 1000 km. Manufacturers such as Ferrari, Maserati, Mercedes-Benz, Porsche, and Aston Martin fielded entries, often featuring professional racing drivers with experience in Formula One, but the majority of the fields were made up of gentleman drivers (privateers) in the likes of Nardis and Bandinis. Cars were split into two main categories: purpose-built sports prototypes which were the highest level in sports car racing, and production-based grand tourers (GT cars) which were based on road-going models and therefore, in general, not as fast as sports prototypes. These categories were further divided into engine displacement classes. The Ferrari and Maserati works teams were fierce competitors throughout much of the decade, but although Maserati cars won many races the make never managed to clinch the World title. The Mercedes-Benz work team pulled out of the championship after 1955 due to their crash at Le Mans, while the small Aston Martin factory team struggled to find success in 1957 and 1958 until it managed to win the championship in 1959. Notably absent from the overall results were the Jaguar works team, who did not enter any events other than Le Mans, despite the potential of the C- and D-Types.

=== 1962 to 1965 ===
In 1962, the calendar was expanded to include smaller races, while the FIA shifted the focus to production based GT cars. The World Sportscar Championship title was discontinued, being replaced by the International Championship for GT Manufacturers. They group cars into three categories with specific engine sizes; less than one litre, less than two litres, and over two litres. Hillclimbs, sprint races and smaller races expanded the championship, which now had about 15 races per season. The famous races like Le Mans still counted towards the prototype championship, however, the points valuation wasn't very tabular so the FIA returned to the original form of the championship with about 6 to 10 races.

For 1963 the three engine capacity classes remained but a prototype category was added. For 1965 the engine classes became for cars under 1300 cc (Class I), under 2000 cc (Class II), and over 2000 cc (Class III). Class III was designed to attract more American manufacturers, with no upper limit on engine displacement.

=== 1966 to 1981 ===
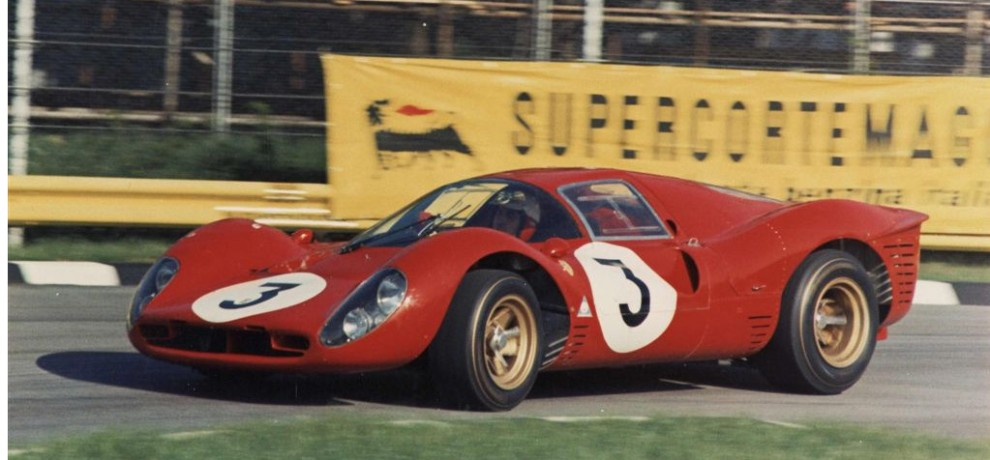
Ferrari 330 P4 at "1000 km di Monza", 1967

The period between 1966 and 1971 was possibly the most successful era of the World Championship, with S (5 L sports cars ) and P (3 L prototypes) classes, and cars such as the Ferrari 512S, Ferrari 330 P4, Ford GT40, Lola T70, Chaparral, Alfa Romeo 33, and Porsche's 908 and 917 battled for supremacy on classic circuits such as Sebring, Nürburgring, Spa-Francorchamps, Monza, Targa Florio, and Le Mans where the Fords won four years in a row, in what is now considered the Golden Age of sports car racing.

In 1972 the Group 6 Prototype and Group 5 Sports Car classes were both replaced by a new Group 5 Sports Car class. These cars were limited to 3.0 L engines by the FIA, and manufacturers gradually lost interest. The new Group 5 Sports Cars, together with Group 4 Grand Touring Cars, would contest the FIA's newly renamed World Championship for Makes from 1972 to 1975. From 1976 to 1981 the World Championship for Makes was open to Group 5 Special Production Cars and other production based categories including Group 4 Grand Touring cars and it was during this period that the nearly-invincible Porsche 935 dominated the championship. Prototypes returned in 1976 as Group 6 cars with their own series, the World Championship for Sports Cars, but this was to last only for two seasons (1976–1977). In 1981, the FIA instituted a drivers championship.

=== 1982 to 1992 ===
In 1982, the FIA attempted to counter a worrying climb in engine output of the Group 5 Special Production Cars by introducing Group C, a new category for closed sports-prototypes (purpose built racing cars) that limited fuel consumption (the theory being that by limiting fuel consumption, engine regulations could be more relaxed). While this change was unwelcome amongst some of the private teams, manufacturer support for the new regulations was immense. Several of the 'old guard' manufacturers returned to the WSC within the next two years, with each marque adding to the diversity of the series. Under the new rules, it was theoretically possible for normally aspirated engines to compete with the (expensive to maintain) forced induction engines that had dominated the series in the '70s and early '80s. In addition, most races ran for either 500 or 1000 km, usually going over three and six hours, respectively, so it was possible to emphasize the "endurance" aspect of the competition as well. Group B cars, which was a GT class, were also allowed to race, but entries in this class were sparse; combined with fatal accidents in rallying where the Group B class saw more popularity, the class (and European GT racing altogether) disappeared from the series, with sports-prototypes dominating the championship.

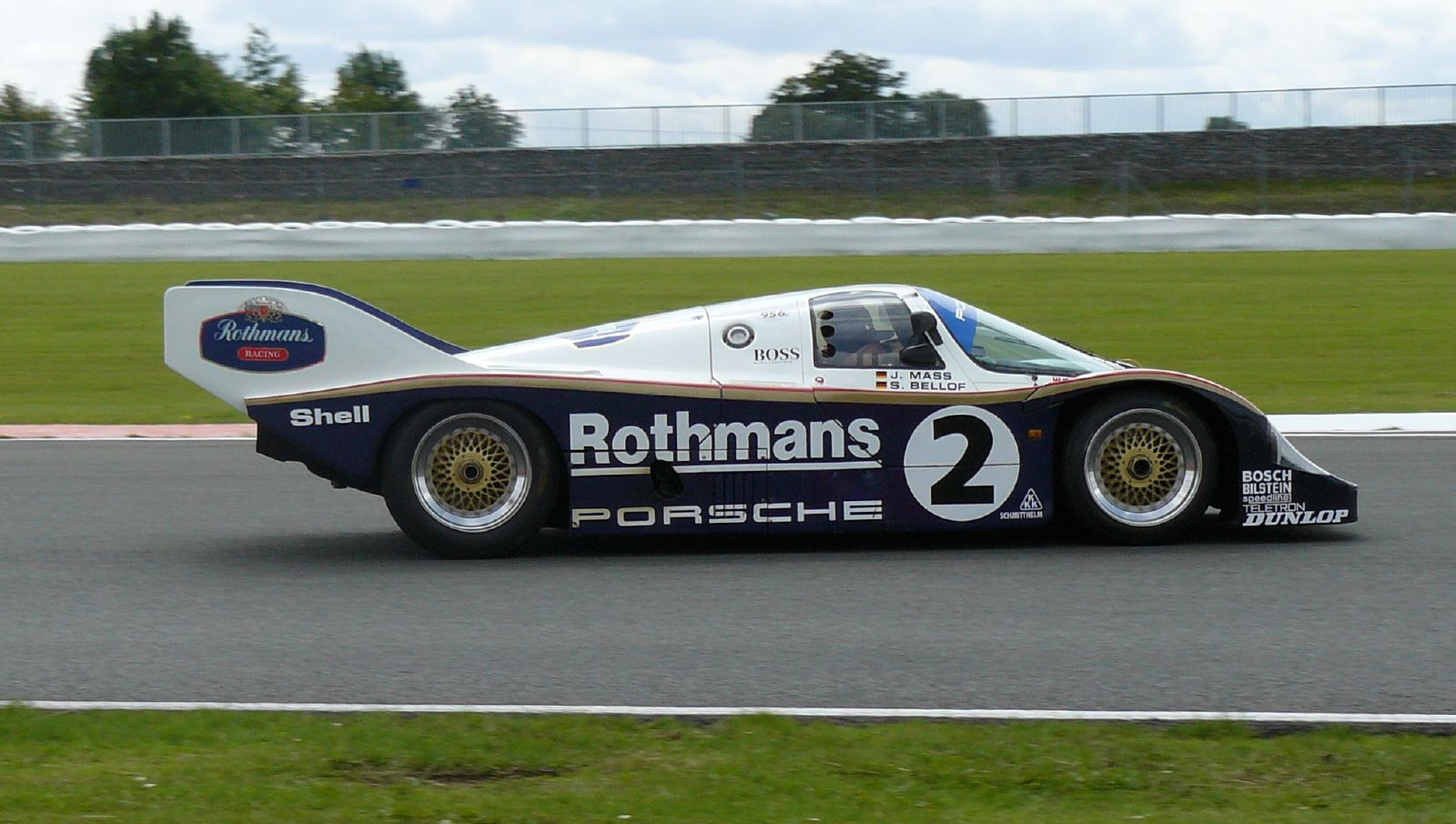
A works Rothmans Porsche 956 at Silverstone

Porsche was the first constructor to join the series, with the 956, but soon several other makes joined the series, including Jaguar Cars, Mercedes-Benz, Nissan, Toyota, Mazda and Aston Martin. As costs increased, a C2 class (originally named C Junior) was created for privateer teams and small manufacturers, with greater limits to fuel consumption. In this lower class, most cars used either the BMW M1 engine or the new Cosworth DFL, but, like in the main class, a variety of solutions were employed by each individual manufacturer. Alba, Tiga, Spice and Ecurie Ecosse were among the most competitive in this class. While the Group C formula had brought manufacturers back to the sport, it was again Porsche - with its 956 & 962 Group C line - that continued their domination of the sport.

For 1986, the World Endurance Championship became the World Sports-Prototype Championship.

Although the Group C formula was a success, with regular crowds of 50,000 to 70,000 at WSC events (a modern Grand Prix in Europe will have similar crowds), and upwards of 350,000 at the 24 hours of Le Mans, the FIA introduced new rules for 1991 at the behest of FIA vice president Bernie Ecclestone; 750 kg machines with contemporary normally aspirated engines, which were purpose-built 3500cc racing units. The new classification, known as Group C Category 1, was designed to mandate Formula One engines. Although power was generally less than existing Group C cars (around 650 bhp compared to around 750 bhp upwards) the new cars are considered to be among the quickest sportscars ever. However, the take up of these new regulations was slow and only a handful of Category 1 cars were ready for the 1991 season. Consequently, the FIA also allowed cars complying with pre-1991 Group C rules to contest the championship (as Group C Category 2 cars) during the one transitional year. They were however seriously handicapped in terms of weight, fuel allocation and grid positions. For 1991 the championship took on yet another new name, the FIA Sportscar World Championship and the new 3.5 litre rules took full effect for the 1992 championship with the old Group C cars no longer included.

=== 1993 demise ===
The new generation of WSC racing engines, with the stated intent of cost reduction and improved competition, quickly proved disastrous. Costs rose massively as works teams developed cars capable of qualifying around halfway up a Formula 1 grid, despite weighing some 200 kg more. Manufacturers again abandoned the sportscar series, realising they now had an engine suitable for F1. In particular, Mercedes and Peugeot elected to either concentrate on or move solely to F1. The more exotic engines were unaffordable for teams like Spice and ADA, thus after the manufacturers left the top class of sportscar racing, the series essentially collapsed. A lack of entries meant the 1993 season was cancelled before the first race.

In 1994, the World Sportscar title would return, this time in the hands of the International Motor Sports Association in North America for use in the IMSA GT series. The name would be used for the series' top class of prototypes until 1998 when the series ended. 1994 also signaled the return of an international GT series after an absence of over a decade with the introduction of the BPR Global GT Series. The success of the series lead to a friendly takeover by the FIA in 1997, becoming the FIA GT Championship. Prototypes were mainly absent from European tracks (Le Mans being the sole notable exception) until 1997, which saw the creation of the International Sports Racing Series which evolved into the short-lived FIA Sportscar Championship in 2001 until 2003. Sports prototypes then came exclusively under the control of the Automobile Club de l'Ouest (ACO) and their sanctioned series, the American Le Mans Series in North America and the Le Mans Series in Europe. The FIA's championship for GTs was eventually promoted to world championship status in 2010, while the ACO launched their own international championship, the Intercontinental Le Mans Cup, the same year.

=== 2012 rebirth ===
Following the success of the ACO's Intercontinental Le Mans Cup (ILMC), the FIA reached an agreement with the ACO to create a new FIA World Endurance Championship for 2012. The series shares many elements of the ILMC, including the use of the 24 Hours of Le Mans as part of the series schedule. The series continued to utilise the ACO's two primary classes, Le Mans Prototypes and GT Endurance (GTE). Hypercar replaced LMP1 as the primary class in 2021, running LMH and LMDh cars, the same as used in the IMSA Sportscar Championship's top class GTP. Championship titles are awarded for constructors and drivers in prototypes, while a constructors cup are awarded in the GTE categories. From 2017 championship titles are awarded also for constructors and drivers in GTE category. LMGT3 replaced GTE in 2024.

== Championship winners ==
Note: In 1953-1984 seasons titles were awarded to manufacturers of sports cars belonging to two main categories: Sports prototype (except of the 1978-1981 seasons) and Grand Touring (GT) (except of the 1953-1961 and 1982 seasons). In 1985-1992 seasons titles were awarded only to teams entering sports prototypes (instead of manufacturers of sports prototypes), excluding teams entering GT cars.

In 1962-1967 seasons titles in both categories were awarded in several engine capacity divisions. In 1962-1963 seasons titles were also awarded in three engine capacity subdivisions (or series) within each division of GT cars category.

Key: Winning manufacturer = The company that owned the intellectual rights to the chassis and the engine of the car that a team entered for a race.; Winning team = The company that registered a car and driver for a race, and was then responsible for preparing and maintaining that car during the race weekend.; SP = Sports prototypes.; SP Jnr = Sports prototypes built by small manufacturers or entered by privateer teams.; GT =GT cars.

Year	Title	Winning manufacturer (1953 – 1984)	Winning team (1985 – 1992)	Winning driver(s) (1981 – 1992)
1953	World Sportscar Championship (SP)	(Italy) Ferrari	-	-
1954	World Sportscar Championship (SP)	(Italy) Ferrari	-	-
1955	World Sportscar Championship (SP)	(West Germany) Mercedes-Benz	-	-
1956	World Sportscar Championship (SP)	(Italy) Ferrari	-	-
1957	World Sportscar Championship (SP)	(Italy) Ferrari	-	-
1958	World Sportscar Championship (SP)	(Italy) Ferrari	-	-
1959	World Sportscar Championship (SP)	(United Kingdom) Aston Martin	-	-
1960	World Sportscar Championship (SP)	(Italy) Ferrari	-	-
1961	World Sportscar Championship (SP)	(Italy) Ferrari	-	-
1962	International Championship for GT Manufacturers (GT)	(Italy) Ferrari (+2.0) (West Germany) Porsche (2.0) (Italy) Fiat-Abarth (1.0)	-	-
1962	Coupe des Sports (SP)	(Italy) Ferrari (3.0) (West Germany) Porsche (2.0) (Italy) Fiat-Abarth (1.0)	-	-
1963	International Championship for GT Manufacturers (GT)	(Italy) Ferrari (+2.0) (West Germany) Porsche (2.0) (Italy) Fiat-Abarth (1.0)	-	-
1963	International Prototype Trophy (SP)	(Italy) Ferrari	-	-
1964	International Championship for GT Manufacturers (GT)	(Italy) Ferrari (+2.0) (West Germany) Porsche (2.0) (Italy) Abarth-Simca (1.0)	-	-
1964	International Prototype Trophy (SP)	(West Germany) Porsche	-	-
1965	International Championship for GT Manufacturers (GT)	(United States) Shelby (+2.0) (West Germany) Porsche (2.0) (Italy) Abarth-Simca (1.3)	-	-
1965	International Prototype Trophy (SP)	(Italy) Ferrari	-	-
1966	International Manufacturers Championship (SP)	(United States) Ford (+2.0) (West Germany) Porsche (2.0)	-	-
1966	International Sports Car Championship (Group 4 Sports Cars)	(United States) Ford (+2.0) (West Germany) Porsche (2.0) (Italy) Abarth (1.3)	-	-
1967	International Manufacturers Championship (SP)	(Italy) Ferrari (+2.0) (West Germany) Porsche (2.0)	-	-
1967	International Sports Car Championship (Group 4 Sports Cars)	(United States) Ford (+2.0) (West Germany) Porsche (2.0) (Italy) Abarth (1.3)	-	-
1968	International Championship for Makes (SP); International Grand Touring Trophy (GT)	(United States) Ford (West Germany) Porsche	-	-
1969	International Championship for Makes (SP); International Grand Touring Trophy (GT)	(West Germany) Porsche (West Germany) Porsche	-	-
1970	International Championship for Makes (SP); International Grand Touring Trophy (GT)	(West Germany) Porsche (West Germany) Porsche	-	-
1971	International Championship for Makes (SP); International Grand Touring Trophy (GT)	(West Germany) Porsche (West Germany) Porsche	-	-
1972	World Championship for Makes (SP); International Grand Touring Trophy (GT)	(Italy) Ferrari (West Germany) Porsche	-	-
1973	World Championship for Makes (SP); International Grand Touring Trophy (GT)	(France) Matra (West Germany) Porsche	-	-
1974	World Championship for Makes (SP); International Grand Touring Trophy (GT)	(France) Matra (West Germany) Porsche	-	-
1975	World Championship for Makes (SP); International Grand Touring Trophy (GT)	(Italy) Alfa Romeo (West Germany) Porsche	-	-
1976	World Championship for Makes (Group 5 Special Production Cars)	(West Germany) Porsche	-	-
1976	World Sports Car Championship (SP)	(West Germany) Porsche	-	-
1977	World Championship for Makes (Group 5 Special Production Cars)	(West Germany) Porsche (West Germany) BMW	-	-
1977	World Sports Car Championship (SP)	(Italy) Alfa Romeo	-	-
1978	World Championship for Makes (Group 5 Special Production Cars)	(West Germany) Porsche	-	-
1979	World Championship for Makes (Group 5 Special Production Cars)	(West Germany) Porsche	-	-
1980	World Championship for Makes (Group 5 Special Production Cars)	(Italy) Lancia	-	-
1981	World Championship for Drivers and Makes (Group 5 Special Production Cars)	(Italy) Lancia	-	(United States) Bob Garretson
1982	World Endurance Championship (SP)	(West Germany) Porsche	-	(Belgium) Jacky Ickx
1983	World Endurance Championship (SP), (GT)	(West Germany) Porsche (SP) (Italy) Alba-Giannini (SP Jnr) (West Germany) Porsche (GT)	-	(Belgium) Jacky Ickx
1984	World Endurance Championship (SP), (GT)	(West Germany) Porsche (SP) (Italy) Alba-Giannini (SP Jnr) (West Germany) BMW (GT)	-	(West Germany) Stefan Bellof
1985	World Endurance Championship (SP)	-	(West Germany) Rothmans Porsche (SP) (United Kingdom) Spice Engineering (SP Jnr)	(United Kingdom) Derek Bell (SP) (West Germany) Hans-Joachim Stuck (SP) (United Kingdom) Gordon Spice (SP Jnr) (United Kingdom) Ray Bellm (SP Jnr)
1986	World Sports Prototype Championship (SP)	-	(Switzerland) Brun Motorsport (SP) (United Kingdom) Ecurie Ecosse (SP Jnr)	(United Kingdom) Derek Bell (SP) (United Kingdom) Gordon Spice (SP Jnr) (United Kingdom) Ray Bellm (SP Jnr)
1987	World Sports Prototype Championship (SP)	-	(United Kingdom) Silk Cut Jaguar (SP) (United Kingdom) Spice Engineering (SP Jnr)	(Brazil) Raul Boesel (SP) (United Kingdom) Gordon Spice (SP Jnr) (Spain) Fermín Vélez (SP Jnr)
1988	World Sports Prototype Championship (SP)	-	(United Kingdom) Silk Cut Jaguar (SP) (United Kingdom) Spice Engineering (SP Jnr)	(United Kingdom) Martin Brundle (SP) (United Kingdom) Gordon Spice (SP Jnr) (United Kingdom) Ray Bellm (SP Jnr)
1989	World Sports Prototype Championship (SP)	-	(Switzerland) Team Sauber Mercedes (SP) (United Kingdom) Chamberlain Engineering (SP Jnr)	(France) Jean-Louis Schlesser (SP) (United Kingdom) Nick Adams (SP Jnr) (Spain) Fermín Vélez (SP Jnr)
1990	World Sports Prototype Championship (SP)	-	(Switzerland) Team Sauber Mercedes	(France) Jean-Louis Schlesser (Italy) Mauro Baldi
1991	Sportscar World Championship (SP)	-	(United Kingdom) Silk Cut Jaguar	(Italy) Teo Fabi
1992	Sportscar World Championship (SP)	-	(France) Peugeot Talbot Sport (SP) (United Kingdom) Chamberlain Engineering (SP Jnr)	(United Kingdom) Derek Warwick (SP) (France) Yannick Dalmas (SP) (France) Ferdinand de Lesseps (SP Jnr)

== See also ==
- FIA World Endurance Championship
