= 1963 24 Hours of Le Mans =

31st 24 Hours of Le Mans endurance race

Previous: 1962	Next: 1964
Index: Races | Winners

The 1963 24 Hours of Le Mans was the 31st Grand Prix of Endurance in the 24 Hours of Le Mans series and took place on 15 and 16 June 1963. It was also the tenth round of the 1963 World Sportscar Championship season.

Despite good weather throughout the race, attrition was high, leaving only twelve classified finishers. There were a number of major accidents, the most serious of which caused the death of Brazilian driver Christian Heins and bad injuries to Roy Salvadori and Jean-Pierre Manzon. This was the first win for a mid- or rear-engined car, and the first all-Italian victory – with F1 drivers Ludovico Scarfiotti and Lorenzo Bandini winning in their Ferrari 250 P. In fact, Ferrari dominated the results list filling the first six places, and the winners’ margin of over 200 km (16 laps) was the biggest since 1927.

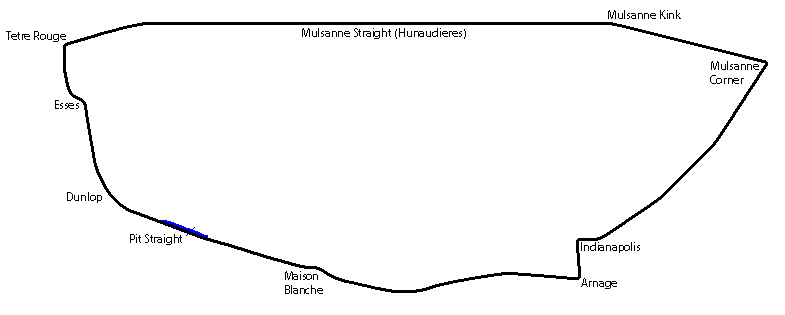
Le Mans in 1963

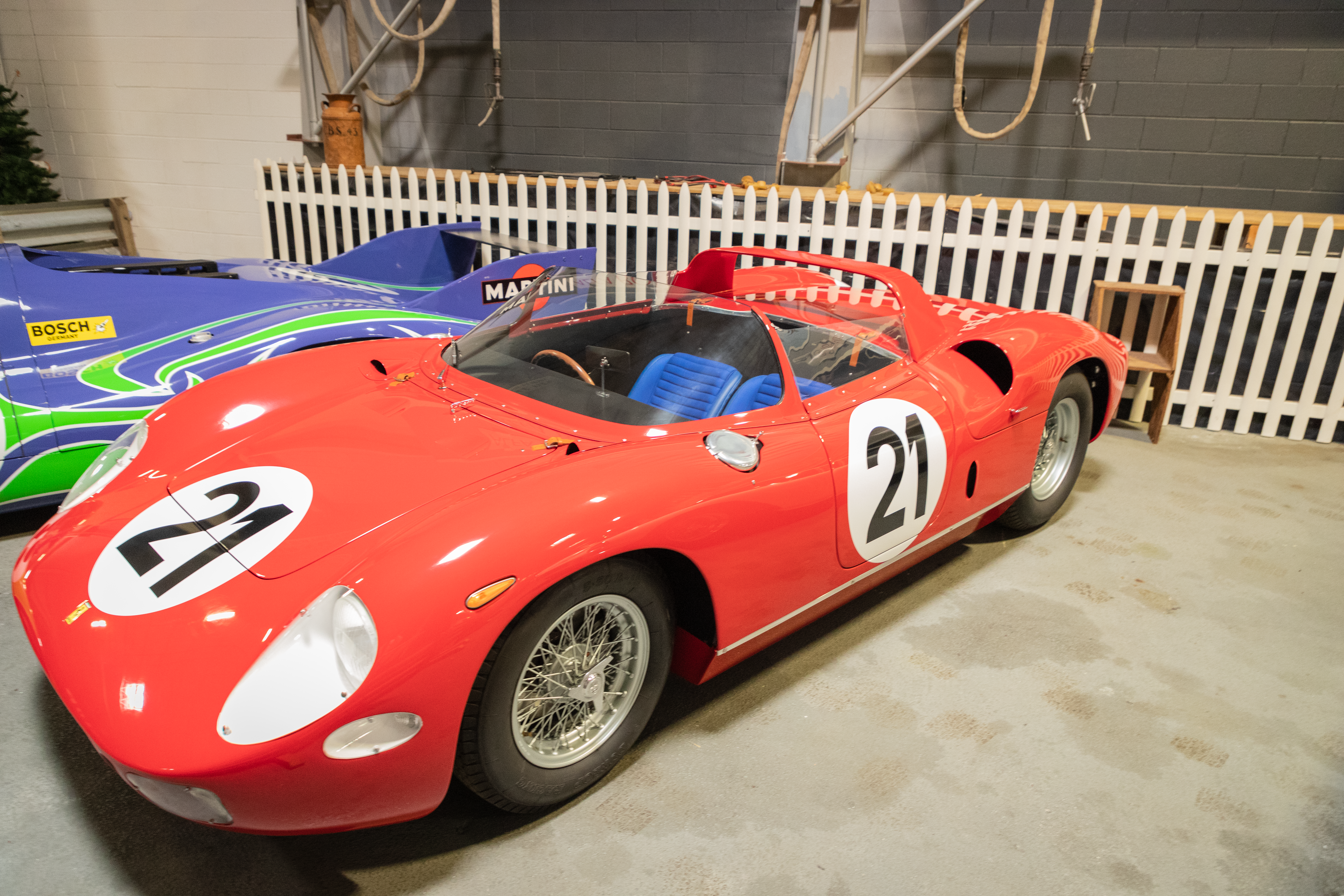
The race was won by a Ferrari 250 P. This example is claimed to be the actual car.

== Regulations ==
In 1963 the CSI (Commission Sportive Internationale - the FIA’s regulatory body) lifted the 4.0 litre engine restriction on its GT classes, as well as introducing a sliding scale for minimum weight versus engine size. That change again opened the field to large American V8s, used on the AC Cobras and Lola Mk6 that year. It also revised the equivalence ratio for forced induction/turbo engines from 1.2 up to 1.4. The minimum height for cars was increased to 850mm (33.5 inches).

The Automobile Club de l'Ouest (ACO) renamed its ‘Experimental’ category as ‘Prototype’ and lifted the 4.0 litre engine restriction for those classes as well. The main change for the race was the starting positions on the grid were now to be determined by the fastest times in practice rather than in order of engine size. In a nod to driver safety, the wearing of safety-belts was now recommended.

== Entries ==
The ACO received 80 entries but after a number of withdrawals there were 55 cars to practice. The proposed entry list comprised:

Category	Classes	Prototype Entries	GT Entries	Total Entries
Large-engines	3.0+, 3.0, 2.5L	14	13	27
Medium-engines	2.0, 1.6, 1.3L	2	10	12
Small-engines	1.15, 1.0, 0.85L	15 (+2 reserves)	0	15
Total Cars		31 (+2 reserves)	23	54 (+1 experimental)

Once again Ferraris easily dominated the entry list with eleven cars. SEFAC Ferrari brought three new prototypes. The 250 P was an innovative mid-engined design of Mauro Forghieri that was a longer version of the Dino. The hefty 3-litre V12 generated 310 bhp. The team's regular Formula 1 drivers were assigned: John Surtees with Willy Mairesse, and Ludovico Scarfiotti with Lorenzo Bandini. The third car was driven by sports-car regulars Mike Parkes and Umberto Maglioli

There were also three new 330 LMB 4-litre front-engined prototypes run by privateer teams. While Ferrari stalwart Pierre Noblet ran a works-supported entry, the North American Racing Team (NART) ran another (for Dan Gurney and Jim Hall) as well as the 330 TRI/LM, for Pedro Rodriguez and Roger Penske, that had won the race the previous year. There was also a new British team – Ronnie Hoare's Maranello Concessionaires entered a 330 LMB for Jack Sears and Mike Salmon.

Four manufacturers lined up against the big Ferrari prototypes: Aston Martin, Maserati, Lister and Lola. John Wyer had convinced the ACO to accept the Aston Martin DP214 prototypes as GT-derivatives of the DB4 cars. The successor DP215 had a new 4.0-litre engine capable of 323 bhp. It was driven by Phil Hill and Lucien Bianchi.

Maserati returned with an updated Tipo 151 coupé for their French agency. Lightened and now fitted with a fuel-injected 5-litre V8 engine, it was the biggest car in the field and produced an impressive 430 bhp capable of 290 kp/h (180 mph). It would be raced by French veteran André Simon and Lloyd ‘Lucky’ Casner (owner of the American Camoradi team racing Maserati cars).

For their second foray into Le Mans, Lola rushed their revolutionary Mk6 GT prototype. The Eric Broadley / Tony Southgate design had a steel monocoque chassis with fibreglass body and intricate suspension design. Initially fitted with a mid-mounted Ford 4.2-litre Indycar engine generated 350 bhp, it was subsequently uprated to the 4.7 litre Ford engine. The car was so light that it needed ballast to reach its 875 kg minimum weight. However it was undergeared and could only reach a maximum 240 kp/h (150 mph). The car would be raced by David Hobbs and debutante Richard Attwood

Porsche (now entered as Porsche System Engineering, a Swiss-registered entity for the works team) had the 2-litre class to itself. They arrived with a pair of developed Porsche 718/8 cars, the type that had won the 1963 Targa Florio when the Ferraris had failed. One a coupé (for ‘Jo’ Bonnier/Tony Maggs), the other a spyder (for Edgar Barth/Herbert Linge), they used the new 2-litre flat-8 Formula 1 engine.

Once again the smaller-engined classes were strongly contested. Charles Deutsch (last year's victor), after the withdrawal of Panhard's engines, signed a deal with German manufacturer Auto Union-DKW. The 750cc three-cylinder, two-stroke engine, called "3=6", could develop 80 bhp and with the streamlined body, could reach 225 kp/h (140 mph). His erstwhile partner, René Bonnet had four works entries. Their new streamlined version was now named the “Aerodjet”. Their French opposition however was from a new team: Jean Rédélé's Alpine marque (also running with 1-litre Renault engines). The new A110 came to Le Mans in its streamlined M63 longtail version.

Austin-Healey had a new body designed by Frank Costin for their Sebring Sprite. The 1100cc BMC engine developed 95 bhp. Another British boutique sports-car manufacturer, Deep Sanderson, entered its new 301 prototype.

Since 1953 the ACO had offered a prize for a turbine-drive car to complete the 24-hour event. Yet it was only this year that a formal entry was received. Rover had worked on turbines for twenty years and the previous year their fourth prototype had done demonstration laps at Le Mans. Based on a BRM Formula 1 car, the twin turbines generated 150 bhp but only gave a maximum speed of 230 kp/h (145 mph). Unable to run on regulation fuel, (it ran on paraffin) the car was not on the official entry list, and given number “00”. And without a heat exchanger, the turbine's fuel consumption was so great (7mpg) that it could not run with a regulation fuel-tank. BRM, in turn, released their grand prix drivers, Richie Ginther and current World Champion Graham Hill.

In the GT division there were four Ferrari 250 GTOs. The works car was driven by sports-car regulars Carlo Maria Abate and Fernand Tavano. The two Belgian teams, Ecurie Francorchamps and Equipe Nationale Belge, returned and NART ran a long-wheelbase version.

Aston Martin had got two of their DP214 cars homologated, running with the same 3.7-litre engine as the DB4. The works team had Grand Prix drivers Bruce McLaren and Innes Ireland in one and Bill Kimberly / Jo Schlesser in the second. Jean Kerguen also returned with his French Aston Martin for the third year.

Briggs Cunningham was back this year with three of the Jaguar E-type ‘Lightweight’ specials overseen by Lofty England. The fuel-injected 3.8-litre Straight-6 engine now developed 310 bhp. Cunningham drove with Bob Grossman while his other regular drivers Walt Hansgen and Roy Salvadori were paired with Augie Pabst and Paul Richards respectively.

After his success in winning the 1959 race, Carroll Shelby had been working with Derek Hurlock, owner of AC Cars, to fit the new 260cu in (4.2-litre) small-block Ford V8 to the AC Ace chassis that was already race-proven at Le Mans. Put into production, it was the Mk 2 version with the bigger 289cu in (4.7-litre) Ford Windsor engine that was entered for the race. One from AC Cars (for Ninian Sanderson and Peter Bolton) was managed by Stirling Moss and the other came from Ed Hugus, who had run the car's race development in America.

In the smaller categories the Porsche works team had a pair Porsche 356 B 2000 GS Carrera GT Dreikantschaber for their regular Dutch drivers Carel Godin de Beaufort and Ben Pon. The cars were now fitted with a new 2.0-litre flat-4 four-cam "Carrera" engine. They would be up against a privateer MG MGB, the manufacturer's latest model, driven by top British rally driver Paddy Hopkirk. In the 1600cc class a pair of works Sunbeam Alpines were matched against three Alfa Romeos run by the teams Scuderia Sant Ambroeus and Scuderia Filipinetti. The two Team Elite Lotuses had the 1300cc to themselves when the Equipe Nationale Belge Elite entry was withdrawn.

== Practice ==
Twenty-three cars availed themselves of the testing weekend over 6–7 April. It was the first appearance of the Ferrari 330 LMB and in it works driver Mike Parkes became the first driver to officially break 300 kp/h (186 mph) on the long Mulsanne Straight. But it was John Surtees who put in the best time over the weekend, with a blistering 3 min 45.8 s. Later, in official qualifying, Phil Hill was also calculated to have hit that magical 300kp/h barrier on the Mulsanne in his Aston Martin prototype.

Rushing to have their Lola GTs ready in time, Eric Broadley drove the first car himself across from their Bromley factory. Although arriving after inspections had officially closed, the ACO, perhaps surprisingly, still allowed the car to enter. The second car, still unassembled, had to be scratched.

Further late withdrawals and no-shows left only 49 cars to practice. The honour of the first Pole Position by qualification went to Pedro Rodriguez in the NART Ferrari with a lap-time of 3 min 50.9 s on Wednesday night. The works Ferrari 250s were second and third (Bandini ahead of Parkes). In fact all eleven Ferraris qualified in the top sixteen places. Hill got his Aston Martin to 4th, with his teammates in 8th and 10th, while the big Maserati was 6th on the grid.

Jo Bonnier got his two-litre Porsche in a very credible 17th with a 4 min 07.9 s, well ahead of his nearest competition – his teammates in 23rd (4 min 13.2 s), and the GT Porsche in 26th with a distant 4 min 35.8 . The fastest of the small cars was the Alpine of Richard/Frescobaldi with 4 min 42.8 s (29th). The Rover turbine did a 4 min 22.0 s that would have qualified it mid-field, but being outside the field it had to start 30 seconds after flagfall at the back of the field.

== Race ==
=== Start ===
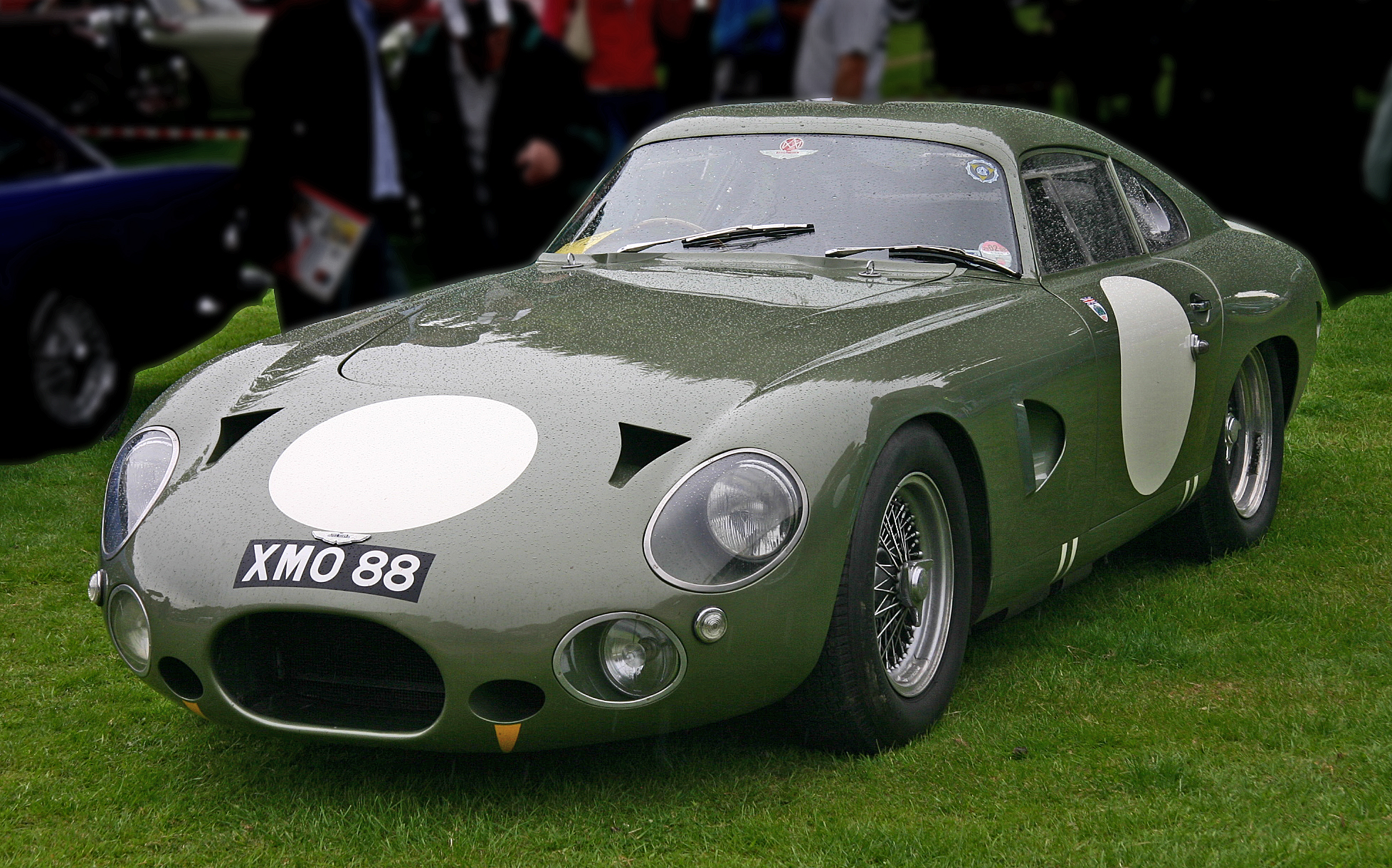
The Aston Martin DP215 of Hill/Bianchi, which retired early in the race

It was a sunny start for the race at 4 pm. Phil Hill got his Aston Martin off the line first, ahead of the Ferraris. But it was the Frenchman André Simon in his Maserati who delighted the local crowd. He blasted past them, nudging Surtees out the way at Mulsanne then overtaking Hill before Arnage to lead the first lap. Pat Ferguson planted his Lotus Elite into the sandbank at Mulsanne on the first lap. He eventually managed to extricate it, only to drop it back in exactly the same spot on his next lap. On the second lap André Guilhaudin, owner-driver of the CD-DKW, crashed it at Indianapolis, and the damage was terminal. Then on only the fifth lap, as the leaders were lapping the tail-enders, Roger Masson's Bonnet clipped the verge on the brow after the Dunlop bridge. It spectacularly somersaulted twice but Masson got out unharmed. Both Phil Hill, now running fourth, and Peter Sargent's Lister hit debris and damaged their gearboxes trying to slow but were able to keep on running. Simon continued to lead throughout his opening 2-hour stint before handing over to his co-driver ‘Lucky’ Casner. However, only an hour into his race, Casner brought the Maserati in with terminal gearbox problems. Likewise the earlier stress on the Hill Aston Martin and Sargent Lister took its toll and they too retired early with broken transmissions.

Ferraris now assumed the top five positions. At the 4-hour mark the works 250s of Surtees/Mairesse and Parkes/Maglioli were ahead of the NART 330 TRI/LM then Scarfiotti/Bandini in the other 250 P and Noblet's privateer 330. Sixth place was Bruce McLaren in the Aston Martin, leading the GT category. However at 8.20pm, a piston shattered in the engine while he was at speed going into the Mulsanne kink. McLaren managed to get the car safely to the roadside but the long oil slick from the holed sump started a catastrophic chain reaction of accidents: Jean Kerguen's DB4 Aston Martin spun out into a ditch, wrecking its differential. Sanderson endured a series of spins in his Cobra but luckily hit nothing and carried on. Then Salvadori's Jaguar arrived and spun at 265 kp/h (165 mph) and crashed into the banking. Fortunately, Salvadori (who had been unable to do up his full harness) was thrown out the rear window as the car burst into flames, then helped by Kerguen. This was then hit by Jean-Pierre Manzon's little Bonnet which rebounded into the middle of the track. Manzon, son of the great French racer Robert Manzon, was seriously injured and thrown onto the road. Christian Heins, leading his class and the Index of Performance, managed to avoid Manzon and the wrecks but in doing so, his Alpine-Renault went out of control, rolled and hit a lamp-post then exploded into flames. ‘Bino’ Heins, whose Willys franchise built the Alpines in Brazil, was killed instantly.

=== Night ===
As night fell, Ferrari's fortunes began to change: the Noblet/Guichet car had to retire after a Ferrari mechanic forgot to replace the oil filler cap. Then Parkes and Maglioli were delayed, losing ten laps, to change the distributor. Carlo Abate, in the works-run GTO, was running third just about midnight when he got off-line going through the tricky Maison Blanche corner. He crashed at speed, wrecking the car, but was not injured. Not so fortunate was Bob Olthoff who crashed his Sebring Sprite there soon afterwards and was taken to hospital with a broken collarbone.

Through the night Surtees and Mairesse continued to build their lead over their teammates. The NART Ferrari had charged back up to third after being delayed. However around 2am an oil-line burst and destroyed Penske's engine. Jo Bonnier, whose Porsche was running 7th and leading the medium-sized classes, came through the huge plume of engine smoke unsighted and crashed heavily in the trees. Bonnier was lucky to get away uninjured.

An hour later, the Gurney/Hall NART Ferrari, now running third, suddenly slowed at Maison Blanche. Hall coasted towards the pits then pushed it the final distance only to be told that the half-shaft had broken. The Kimberly/Schlesser Aston Martin inherited the place but the curse of third place struck again soon before 2am, when they were forced to retire with piston problems, ending Aston Martin's challenge.

By the halfway mark at 4am, there were only 21 cars left running. However, Ferrari had the numbers to outlast their opposition. Surtees/Mairesse had done 189 laps, with a lap's lead over Scarfiotti/Bandini. The works cars already had a massive 10-lap lead over the remaining NART Ferrari of Gregory/Piper, and the two Belgian GTOs. Sixth was the Barth/Linge Porsche 718 moving past the Maranello Ferrari and Cunningham's Jaguar, with the Parkes’ Ferrari charging back up the field in 9th. The Rover was cruising quietly just outside the top-10

=== Morning ===
As dawn broke among the rising mist, David Hobbs in the Lola had a big accident at Maison Blanche. After running as high as 8th, the team had been battling the gearbox most of the night, losing two hours in the pits. Hobbs had been trying to change down for the corner when the gearbox finally jammed. A few hours later the leading Porsche of Barth/Linge, now up to 5th, lost a rear wheel coming up to the main straight. Edgar Barth pushed it the half kilometre to the pits where it was repaired and carried on.

Briggs Cunningham and Bob Grossman had steadily moved their Lightweight Jaguar into the top-10 through the night. However, on Sunday morning the brake pedal snapped as Grossman came to the end of the Mulsanne straight. The car slammed through three rows of haybales, scattering spectators, but he was able to get the car back to the pits. Stealing parts from their third car that had retired in the first hour, they lost two hours but got back into the race.

After leading for fifteen hours, Surtees and Mairesse had built up a two-lap lead. However at 10.45 Surtees pitted for fuel and a driver change. Mairesse got no further than the Esses when the car burst into flames. Fuel had carelessly been spilt in the engine bay and an electrics spark applying the brake lights ignited it. Mairesse got out, overalls on fire, before the car came to a halt. The mild burns to his face and arms kept him out of racing for two months.

Their teammates Scarfiotti and Bandini moved up to take the lead they would not cede.

=== Finish and post-race ===
In the end they won easily – by 16 laps. In a record distance, it was the widest winning margin since Bentley's epic 1927 win (350 km). With Scarfiotti, Bandini and Ferrari it was the first all-Italian Le Mans victory, as well as being the first win for a mid- or rear-engined car. In a dominant display Ferrari took the top six places. The Scuderia shared the top places with the two Belgian GT teams racing each other: Parkes and Maglioli chased hard and only failed to catch the Equipe Nationale Belge GTO, in second, by just over 100 metres. Fourth was the Ecurie Francorchamps GTO barely a lap behind. The Belgian drivers all celebrated together by driving to Paris two days later, and going to a nightclub until 4am leaving their respective racing cars parked outside.

The Maranello Concessionaires Ferrari came in 5th after battling overheating issues for most of the race. Sixth, and last surviving Ferrari, was the NART 250 GTO/LMB of Gregory and Piper. It had been out of alignment since 8am when Gregory had gone off at Arnage taking an hour to dig it out of the sand-trap.

After a remarkably trouble-free run (needing no mechanical work or even a change of tyres), the Rover turbine easily exceeded its 3600 km minimum distance (an average of 150 km/h) and was awarded the ACO's FF25000 prize. Although not classified, it covered sufficient distance that it would have finished 7th and beaten the 1958 winning car. In fact, classified 7th was the Sanderson/Bolton AC Cobra

After their troubles, the Barth/Linge Porsche came in 8th and Cunningham's Jaguar was 9th. After the race-start antics the Lotus Elite of Ferguson and Wagstaff, finished tenth and class-winner.

Despite the good weather, attrition was high and the number of major accidents meant there were only fourteen cars running at the end, of the 49 starters. The sole surviving Bonnet won the Index of Thermal Efficiency, driven by Claude Bobrowski and young debutante motorcyclist Jean-Pierre Beltoise

== Official results ==
=== Finishers ===
Results taken from Quentin Spurring's book, officially licensed by the ACO Class winners are in Bold text.

Pos	Class	No	Team	Drivers	Chassis	Engine	Laps
1	**P** **3.0**	**21**	(Italy) **SpA Ferrari SEFAC**	(Italy) **Ludovico Scarfiotti** (Italy) **Lorenzo Bandini**	Ferrari 250 P	Ferrari 3.0L V12	339
2	**GT**; **3.0**	**24**	(Belgium) **Equipe Nationale Belge**	(Belgium) **“Beurlys” (Jean Blaton)** (Belgium) **Gérard Langlois van Ophem**	Ferrari 250 GTO	Ferrari 3.0L V12	323
3	P 3.0	22	(Italy) SpA Ferrari SEFAC	(United Kingdom) Mike Parkes (Italy) Umberto Maglioli	Ferrari 250 P	Ferrari 3.0L V12	323
4	GT; 3.0	25	(Belgium) Ecurie Francorchamps	(France) Pierre Dumay (Belgium) “Eldé” (Leon Dernier)	Ferrari 250 GTO	Ferrari 3.0L V12	322
5	**P** **+3.0**	**12**	(United Kingdom) **Maranello Concessionaires Ltd.**	(United Kingdom) **Mike Salmon** (United Kingdom) **Jack Sears**	Ferrari 330 LMB	Ferrari 4.0L V12	314
6	GT; 3.0	26	(United States) North American Racing Team	(United States) Masten Gregory (United Kingdom) David Piper	Ferrari 250 GTO/LMB	Ferrari 3.0L V12	312
N/C *	Exp	00	(United Kingdom) Owen Racing Organisation	(United Kingdom) Graham Hill (United States) Richie Ginther	Rover-BRM	Rover Turbine	310
7	**GT** **+3.0**	**3**	(United Kingdom) **AC Cars Ltd**	(United Kingdom) **Ninian Sanderson** (United Kingdom) **Peter Bolton**	AC Cobra Hardtop	Ford 4.7L V8	310
8	**P** **2.0**	**28**	(Germany) **Porsche System Engineering**	(Germany) **Edgar Barth** (Germany) **Herbert Linge**	Porsche 718/8 W-RS Spyder	Porsche 1962cc F8	300
9	GT +3.0	15	(United States) Briggs Cunningham	(United States) Briggs Cunningham (United States) Bob Grossman	Jaguar E-Type Lightweight	Jaguar 3.8L S6	283
10	**GT**; **1.3**	**39**	(United Kingdom) **Team Elite**	(United Kingdom) **Pat Ferguson** (United Kingdom) **John Wagstaff**	Lotus Elite Mk14	Coventry Climax 1216cc S4	270
11	**P** **1.15**	**53**	(France) **Automobiles René Bonnet**	(France) **Claude Bobrowski** (France) **Jean-Pierre Beltoise**	Bonnet Aérodjet LM6	Renault-Gordini 1108cc S4	269
12	**GT**; **2.0**	**31**	(United States) **A. Hutcheson** (private entrant)	(United States) **Alan Hutcheson** (United Kingdom) **Paddy Hopkirk**	MG MGB Hardtop	BMC 1803cc S4	264
N/C**	P 1.15	41	(France) Automobiles René Bonnet	(France) Robert Bouharde (Italy) Bruno Basini	Bonnet Aérodjet LM6	Renault-Gordini 1108cc S4	211

- Note *: Not Classified as the entry was in the Experimental class.
- Note **: Not Classified for insufficient distance (car failed to cover 70% of its class-winner's distance)

=== Did not finish ===
Pos	Class	No	Team	Drivers	Chassis	Engine	Laps	Reason
DNF	P 3.0	23	(Italy) SpA Ferrari SEFAC	(United Kingdom) John Surtees (Belgium) Willy Mairesse	Ferrari 250 P	Ferrari 3.0L V12	252	fuel spill / fire (19hr)
DNF	P 1.0	50	(France) Automobiles Alpine	(France) Bernard Boyer (France) Guy Verrier	Alpine A110 M63	Renault-Gordini 996cc S4	227	conrod (23hr)
DNF	GT; 1.6	32	(United Kingdom) Sunbeam Talbot	(United Kingdom) Keith Ballisat (United Kingdom) Jack Lewis	Sunbeam Alpine	Sunbeam 1592cc S4	200	engine (19hr)
DNF	GT; 1.3	38	(United Kingdom) Team Elite	(Australia) Frank Gardner (United Kingdom) John Coundley	Lotus Elite Mk14	Coventry Climax 1216cc S4	167	engine (16hr)
DNF	GT; 1.6	34	(Italy) Scuderia Sant Ambroeus	(Italy) Giancarlo Sala (Italy) Romolo Rossi	Alfa Romeo Giulietta SZ	Alfa Romeo 1570cc S4	155	gearbox (16hr)
DNF	P +3.0	6	(United Kingdom) Lola Cars Ltd.	(United Kingdom) David Hobbs (United Kingdom) Richard Attwood	Lola Mk6 GT	Ford 4.7L V8	151	accident (15hr)
DNF	P +3.0	7	(United Kingdom) David Brown Racing Dept.	(United States) William Kimberly (France) Jo Schlesser	Aston Martin DP214	Aston Martin 3.7L S6	139	piston (11hr)
DNF	P +3.0	11	(United States) North American Racing Team	(United States) Dan Gurney (United States) Jim Hall	Ferrari 330 LMB	Ferrari 4.0L V12	126	gearbox (10hr)
DSQ	GT +3.0	4	(United States) E. Hugus (private entrant)	(United States) Ed Hugus (United Kingdom) Peter Jopp	AC Cobra Coupé	Ford 4.7L V8	117	premature oilchange (10hr)
DNF	GT; 2.0	30	(Germany) Porsche System Engineering	(Netherlands) Ben Pon (Switzerland) Heinz Schiller	Porsche 356 B 2000 GS/GT	Porsche 1967cc F4	115	engine (10hr)
DNF	P +3.0	10	(United States) North American Racing Team	(Mexico) Pedro Rodríguez (United States) Roger Penske	Ferrari 330 TRI/LM	Ferrari 4.0L V12	113	oil line (9hr)
DSQ	P 1.0	44	(United Kingdom) Lawrence Tune Engineering	(United Kingdom) Chris Lawrence (United Kingdom) Chris Spender	Deep Sanderson 301	BMC 997cc S4	110	insufficient distance (15hr)
DNF	P 3.0	27	(Germany) Porsche System Engineering	(Sweden) Joakim ‘Jo’ Bonnier (South Africa) Tony Maggs	Porsche 718/8 GTR Coupé	Porsche 1981cc F8	109	accident (9hr)
DNF	GT; 3.0	20	(Italy) SpA Ferrari SEFAC	(Italy) Carlo Maria Abate (France) Fernand Tavano	Ferrari 250 GTO	Ferrari 3.0L V12	105	accident (9hr)
DSQ	P 1.0	58	(France) J-G. Branche (private entrant)	(France) Jean-Georges Branche (Belgium) Claude Dubois	Abarth 850	Fiat 847cc S4	96	premature refuel (12hr)
DNF	GT; 2.0	29	(Germany) Porsche System Engineering	(Netherlands) Carel Godin de Beaufort (Germany) Gerhard 'Gerd' Koch	Porsche 356 B 2000 GS/GT	Porsche 1967cc F4	94	engine (8hr)
DNF	P 1.15	42	(United Kingdom) Donald Healey Motor Company	(South Africa) Bob Olthoff (United Kingdom) Sir John Whitmore	Austin-Healey Sebring Sprite	BMC 1101cc S4	94	accident (9hr)
DNF	GT; 1.6	33	(United Kingdom) Sunbeam Talbot	(United Kingdom) Peter Harper (United Kingdom) Peter Procter	Sunbeam Alpine	Sunbeam 1592cc S4	93	head gasket (13hr)
DNF	P +3.0	9	(Belgium) P. Noblet (private entrant)	(Belgium) Pierre Noblet (France) Jean Guichet	Ferrari 330 LMB	Ferrari 4.0L V12	79	oil pipe (8hr)
DSQ	GT; 1.6	35	(Italy) Scuderia Sant Ambroeus	(Italy) Giampiero Biscaldi (Italy) “Kim” (Sergio Pedretti)	Alfa Romeo Giulietta SZ	Alfa Romeo 1570cc S4	70	premature oilchange (7hr)
DNF	GT +3.0	19	(France) J. Kerguen (private entrant)	(France) Jean Kerguen (France) "Franc" (Jacques Dewez)	Aston Martin DB4 GT Zagato	Aston Martin 3.7L S6	65	accident / rear axle (7hr)
DNF	P 1.0	49	(France) Automobiles Alpine	(France) René Richard (Italy) Piero Frescobaldi	Alpine A110 M63	Renault-Gordini 996cc S4	63	clutch (8hr)
DNF	GT +3.0	8	(United Kingdom) David Brown Racing Dept.	(New Zealand) Bruce McLaren (United Kingdom) Innes Ireland	Aston Martin DP214	Aston Martin 3.7L S6	59	piston (6hr)
DNF	P 1.0	48	(France) Automobiles Alpine	(Brazil) Christian ‘Bino’ Heins (France) José Rosinski	Alpine A110 M63	Renault-Gordini 996cc S4	50	fatal accident (6hr)
DNF	P 1.0	52	(France) Urbain Fabre	(France) Jean-Pierre Manzon (France) Jean Rolland	Bonnet Aérodjet LM6	Renault-Gordini 996cc S4	47	accident (6hr)
DNF	P +3.0	2	Maserati France	(France) André Simon (United States) Lloyd 'Lucky' Casner	Maserati Tipo 151/3 Coupé	Maserati 4.9L V8	40	gearbox (4hr)
DNF	GT +3.0	16	(United States) Briggs Cunningham	(United Kingdom) Roy Salvadori (United States) Paul Richards	Jaguar E-Type Lightweight	Jaguar 3.8L S6	40	accident (6hr)
DNF	P +3.0	17	(United Kingdom) P.J. Sargent (private entrant)	(United Kingdom) Peter Sargent (United Kingdom) Peter Lumsden	Lister Costin Coupe	Jaguar 3.8L S6	29	engine (4hr)
DNF	P +3.0	18	(United Kingdom) David Brown Racing Dept.	(United States) Phil Hill (Belgium) Lucien Bianchi	Aston Martin DP215	Aston Martin 4.0L S6	29	gearbox (4hr)
DNF	P 1.0	54	(France) Automobiles René Bonnet	(France) Gérard Laureau (France) Jean Vinatier	Bonnet RB5	Renault 716cc S4	25	out of fuel (3hr)
DNF	GT +3.0	14	(United States) Briggs Cunningham	(United States) Walt Hansgen (United States) Augie Pabst	Jaguar E-Type Lightweight	Jaguar 3.8L S6	8	gearbox (1hr)
DNF	GT; 1.6	36	(Switzerland) Scuderia Filipinetti	(Switzerland) Karl Foitek (Switzerland) Armand Schäfer	Alfa Romeo Giulietta GZ	Alfa Romeo 1570cc S4	7	valve gear (2hr)
DNF	P 1.0	51	(France) Automobiles René Bonnet	(France) Roger Masson (France) Pierre Monneret	Bonnet Aérodjet LM6	Renault-Gordini 996cc S4	4	accident (1hr)
DNF	P 1.0	55	(France) "Sarayac" (private entrant)	(France) “Sarayac” (Guy Flayac) (France) Lucien Barthe	Abarth 1000 SP	Fiat 998cc S4	3	engine (1hr)
DNF	P 1.0	56	(Germany) Auto Union GmbH	(France) André Guilhaudin (France) Alain Bertaut	CD-DKW Coupé	DKW 750cc S3 (2-Stroke)	1	accident (1hr)

=== Did not practise ===
Pos	Class	No	Team	Drivers	Chassis	Engine	Reason
DNP	GT +3.0	1	(United States) A.Green (private entrant)	(United States) Jerry Grant (United States) Don Campbell	Chevrolet Corvette (C2)	Chevrolet 5.4L V8	did not arrive
DNP	GT +3.0	5	(United Kingdom) Lola Cars Ltd.	(South Africa) Tony Maggs (Federation of Rhodesia and Nyasaland) John Love	Lola Mk6 GT	Ford 4.7L V8	did not arrive in time
DNP	GT; 1.3	40	(Belgium) Equipe Nationale Belge	(Belgium) Claude Dubois (Belgium) Georges Harris	Lotus Elite Mk14	Coventry Climax 1216cc S4	did not arrive
DNP	P 1.0	44	(Switzerland) Equipe Lausannoise	(Belgium) Bernard Collomb	Deep Sanderson 301	BMC 997cc S4	did not arrive
DNP	P 1.15	43	(Switzerland) Scuderia Filipinetti	(Switzerland) Herbert Müller (Switzerland) Jean-Jacques Thuner	ASA 1000 GT	ASA 1032cc S4	did not arrive
DNP	P 1.0	46	(Italy) Scuderia AS Elmo d’Argento	(France) Jean Vinatier (France) Paul Condrillier	ASA 1000 GT	ASA 996cc S4	did not arrive
DNP	P 1.0	47	(Italy) Scuderia AS Elmo d’Argento	(Italy) Carlo Facetti (Italy) Giorgio Bassi	ASA 1000 GT	ASA 996cc S4	did not arrive

=== Class winners ===
Class	Prototype Winners		Class	GT Winners	
Prototype >3000	#12 Ferrari 330 LMB	Salmon / Sears	Grand Touring >3000	#3 AC Cobra	Sanderson / Bolton
Prototype 3000	#21 Ferrari 250 P	Scarfiotti / Bandini	Grand Touring 3000	#24 Ferrari 250 GTO	“Beurlys”/ van Ophem
Prototype 2500	no entrants		Grand Touring 2500	no entrants	
Prototype 2000	#28 Porsche 718/8 Spyder	Barth / Linge	Grand Touring 2000	#31 MGB	Hutcheson / Hopkirk
Prototype 1600	no entrants		Grand Touring 1600	no finishers	
Prototype 1300	no entrants		Grand Touring 1300	#39 Lotus Elite	Ferguson / Wagstaff
Prototype 1150	#53 Bonnet Aérodjet LM6	Bobrowski / Beltoise	Grand Touring 1150	no entrants	
Prototype 1000	no finishers		Grand Touring 1000	no entrants	

=== Index of Thermal Efficiency ===
Pos	Class	No	Team	Drivers	Chassis	Score
1	P 1.15	53	(France) Automobiles René Bonnet	(France) Claude Bobrowski (France) Jean-Pierre Beltoise	Bonnet Aérodjet LM6	1.25
2	P 3.0	21	(Italy) SpA Ferrari SEFAC	(Italy) Ludovico Scarfiotti (Italy) Lorenzo Bandini	Ferrari 250 P	1.18
3	GT; 1.3	39	(United Kingdom) Team Elite	(United Kingdom) Pat Ferguson (United Kingdom) John Wagstaff	Lotus Elite Mk14	1.17
4	P 3.0	22	(Italy) SpA Ferrari SEFAC	(United Kingdom) Mike Parkes (Italy) Umberto Maglioli	Ferrari 250 P	0.95
5	GT; 3.0	26	(United States) North American Racing Team	(United States) Masten Gregory (United Kingdom) David Piper	Ferrari 250 GTO/LMB	0.93
6	GT; 3.0	24	(Belgium) Equipe Nationale Belge	(Belgium) “Beurlys” (Jean Blaton) (Belgium) Gérard Langlois van Ophem	Ferrari 250 GTO	0.90
7	GT; 3.0	25	(Belgium) Ecurie Francorchamps	(France) Pierre Dumay (Belgium) “Eldé” (Leon Dernier)	Ferrari 250 GTO	0.85
8	GT; 2.0	31	(United States) A. Hutcheson (private entrant)	(United States) Alan Hutcheson (United Kingdom) Paddy Hopkirk	MG MGB Hardtop	0.85
9	P +3.0	12	(United Kingdom) Maranello Concessionaires Ltd.	(United Kingdom) Mike Salmon (United Kingdom) Jack Sears	Ferrari 330 LMB	0.85
10	P 2.0	28	(Germany) Porsche System Engineering	(Germany) Edgar Barth (Germany) Herbert Linge	Porsche 718/8 W-RS Spyder	0.84

- Note: Only the top ten positions are included in this set of standings.

=== Index of Performance ===
Taken from Moity's book, at odds with Quentin Spurring's book.

Pos	Class	No	Team	Drivers	Chassis	Score
1	P 3.0	21	(Italy) SpA Ferrari SEFAC	(Italy) Ludovico Scarfiotti (Italy) Lorenzo Bandini	Ferrari 250 P	1.236
2=	GT; 3.0	24	(Belgium) Equipe Nationale Belge	(Belgium) “Beurlys” (Jean Blaton) (Belgium) Gérard Langlois van Ophem	Ferrari 250 GTO	1.178
2=	P 3.0	22	(Italy) SpA Ferrari SEFAC	(United Kingdom) Mike Parkes (Italy) Umberto Maglioli	Ferrari 250 P	1.178
4	P 3.0	22	(Italy) SpA Ferrari SEFAC	(United Kingdom) Mike Parkes (Italy) Umberto Maglioli	Ferrari 250 P	1.174
5	P 2.0	28	(Germany) Porsche System Engineering	(Germany) Edgar Barth (Germany) Herbert Linge	Porsche 718/8 W-RS Spyder	1.141
6	GT; 3.0	26	(United States) North American Racing Team	(United States) Masten Gregory (United Kingdom) David Piper	Ferrari 250 GTO/LMB	1.138
7	P 1.15	53	(France) Automobiles René Bonnet	(France) Claude Bobrowski (France) Jean-Pierre Beltoise	Bonnet Aérodjet LM6	1.121
8	P +3.0	12	(United Kingdom) Maranello Concessionaires Ltd.	(United Kingdom) Mike Salmon (United Kingdom) Jack Sears	Ferrari 330 LMB	1.120
9	GT; 1.3	39	(United Kingdom) Team Elite	(United Kingdom) Pat Ferguson (United Kingdom) John Wagstaff	Lotus Elite Mk14	1.102
10	GT +3.0	3	(United Kingdom) AC Cars Ltd	(United Kingdom) Ninian Sanderson (United Kingdom) Peter Bolton	AC Cobra Hardtop	1.097

- Note: Only the top ten positions are included in this set of standings. A score of 1.00 means meeting the minimum distance for the car, and a higher score is exceeding the nominal target distance.

=== Statistics ===
Taken from Quentin Spurring's book, officially licensed by the ACO

- Fastest lap in practice – P.Rodriguez, #10 Ferrari 330 TRI/LM – 3m 50.9s; 209.87 km/h (130.41 mph)
- Fastest lap – J.Surtees, #23 Ferrari 250 P – 3:53.3secs; 207.71 km/h (129.07 mph)
- Distance – 4,561.71 km (2,834.52 mi)
- Winner's average speed – 190.07 km/h (118.10 mph)
- Attendance – 300 000

=== Challenge Mondial de Vitesse et Endurance Standings ===
Pos	Manufacturer	Points
1	(Italy) Ferrari	39
2	(West Germany) Porsche	35
3	(United Kingdom) Jaguar	22
4	(Italy) Alfa Romeo	10

Citations
