= Maxton Rollerskate =

American sportscar (1992-1994)

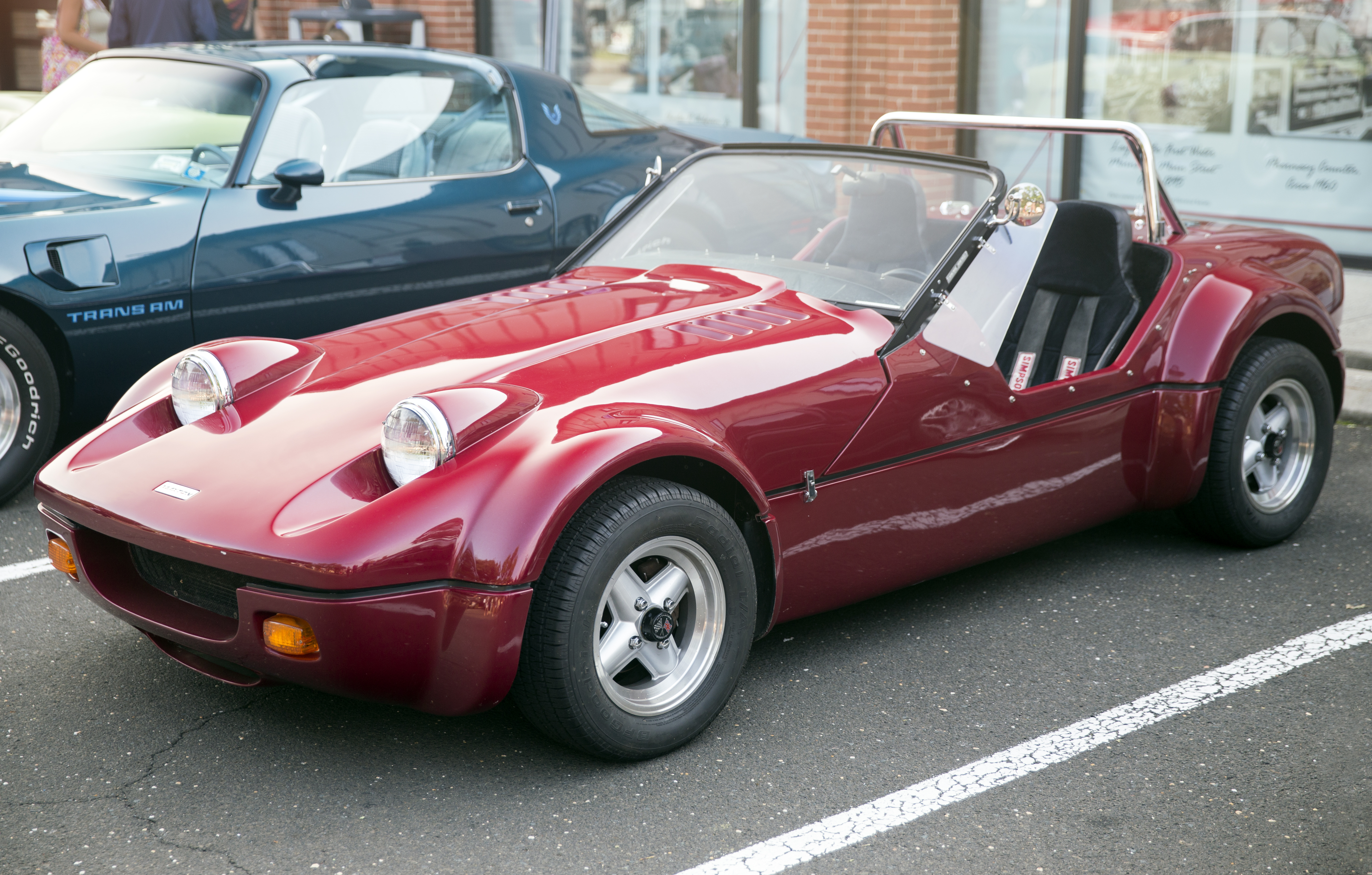

Overview
- Manufacturer: Maxton Components Ltd.
- Assembly: United States: Englewood, Colorado
- Designer: Ben van der Linden (chassis); Michael Mate (body); Gary Valler (suspension)

Body and chassis
- Class: Sports car
- Body style: Roadster
- Layout: F-M/R
- Platform: Custom tubular steel chassis

Powertrain
- Engine: Two-rotor Mazda rotary
- Transmission: 5-speed manual

Dimensions
- Wheelbase: 90 in (2,286 mm) (short); 96 in (2,438 mm) (long)
- Length: 142 1/2 in (3,620 mm) (short); 148 1/2 in (3,772 mm) (long)
- Width: 64 in (1,626 mm)
- Height: 41 1/2 in (1,054 mm)
- Curb weight: 1,680 lb (762 kg)

The Maxton Rollerskate is an American sports roadster built in the early 1990s. It is powered by a Mazda rotary engine. Just over 50 examples were produced at the factory in Colorado.

== History ==
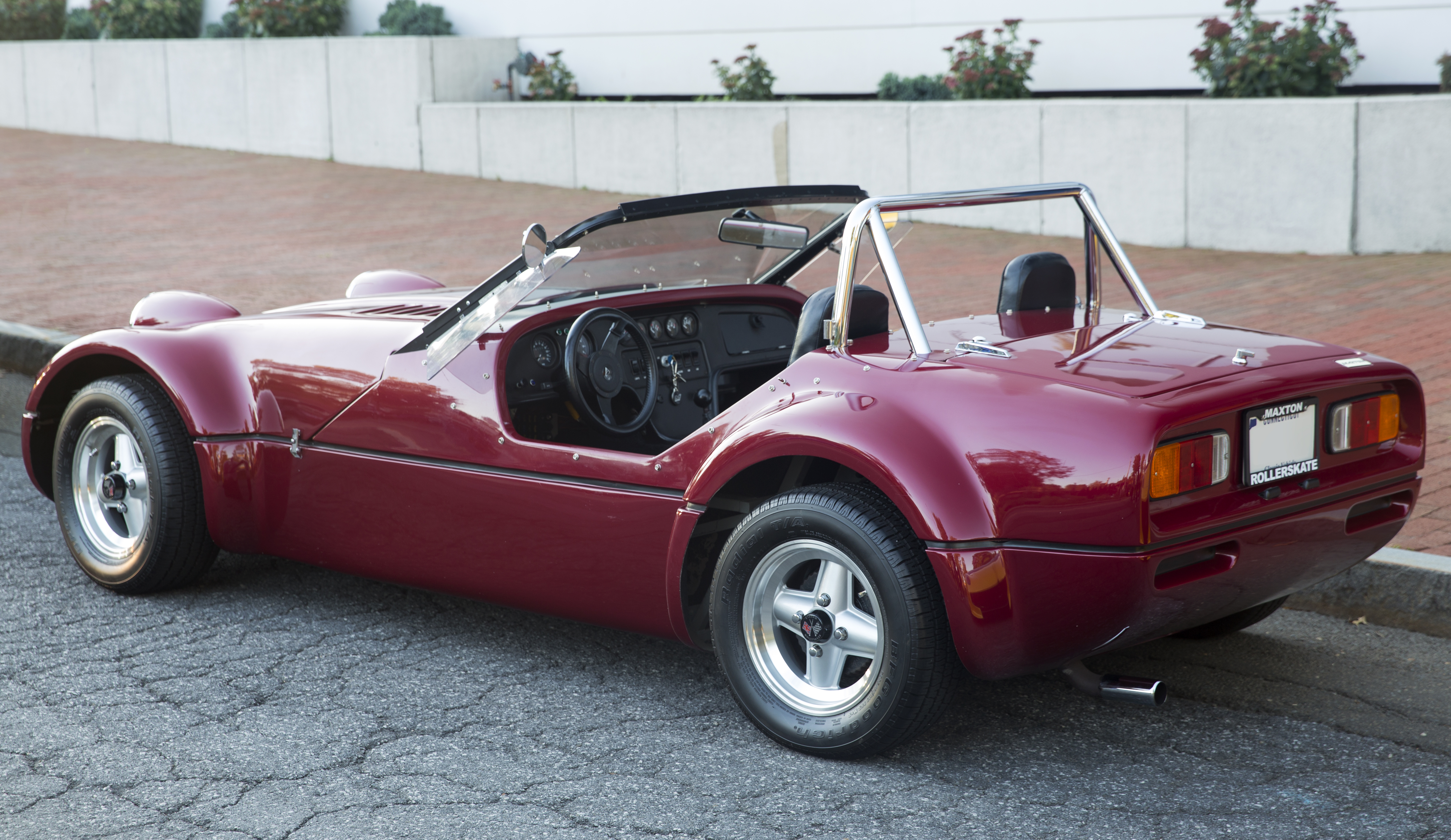
Rear view

The Maxton Rollerskate was created by Robert DeLano Sutherland, a Colorado businessman who operated a chain of lumber yards. Sutherland graduated from Yale University in 1965, and later became a vintage car collector and amateur racing driver. In addition, he established several charities, including the Colorado Grand annual charity tour open to cars from 1960 and earlier and racing cars of distinction. He was inducted into the Colorado Motorsports Hall of Fame in 2023. Sutherland lived with bipolar disorder, and is memorialized by the Robert D. Sutherland Memorial Foundation, established after his death from an aneurism on 13 November 1999.

Sutherland's goal with the Rollerskate was to recreate the experience of driving a classic British roadster, but with a modern powertrain and running gear. Work on what became the Rollerskate began in June 1988.

The car's steel multi-tube chassis was designed by Ben van der Linden, Vice President of Engineering for SCCA Enterprises and overseer of the SCCA Spec race series. Gary Valler designed the suspension. The fiberglass body for the car was designed by artist Michael Mate. Molds for the body were created in spring 1990 by Walter Thurner of C.F. Maier Composites. The Maxton name was suggested by Sutherland. A test driver described the car as handling "like a rollerskate", and the name stuck.

Once the first prototype chassis was driveable, Dan Ripley joined the project as a test driver. Sutherland and Ripley had previously partnered to import the Ford RS200 Group B rally car to the US through their company Pleasurable Developments, which Sutherland indicated was also the early home of this new car.

Two new companies were established to make and sell the Rollerskate. Maxton Components Ltd. produced the chassis, bodywork, and all custom components for the car, while Maxton Concessionaires Ltd. handled sales of parts packages and cars in varying stages of completion to buyers. The Maxton factory was located in Englewood, Colorado.

A number of pre-production chassis were built. Chassis 1 was built as a rolling test-bed without bodywork. When Chassis 2 was complete, the mechanical parts from Chassis 1 were transferred to it, and Chassis 1 was stored at the factory. Much later Ben van der Linden built Chassis 1 up as a complete car. Chassis 2 was built into a car complete with early bodywork, which was later replaced by a production body. The process of building Chassis 3 into a running car was the subject of a series of MotorWeek episodes on PBS television. The completed Rollerskate was then awarded to Chris Payton as part of a prize drawing.

The Rollerskate was sold as a "component car" rather than a "kit car", with final assembly to be carried out by a competent mechanical shop, although the buyer could opt to do the work themselves.

Over the course of production, ownership of the companies changed hands. While one reference says that Sutherland bought Ripley out, others say that Ripley bought Sutherland out to became owner of Maxton Components Ltd.

Total Rollerskate production is said to have been 51 cars, plus the 3 cars based on pre-production chassis.

== Features ==
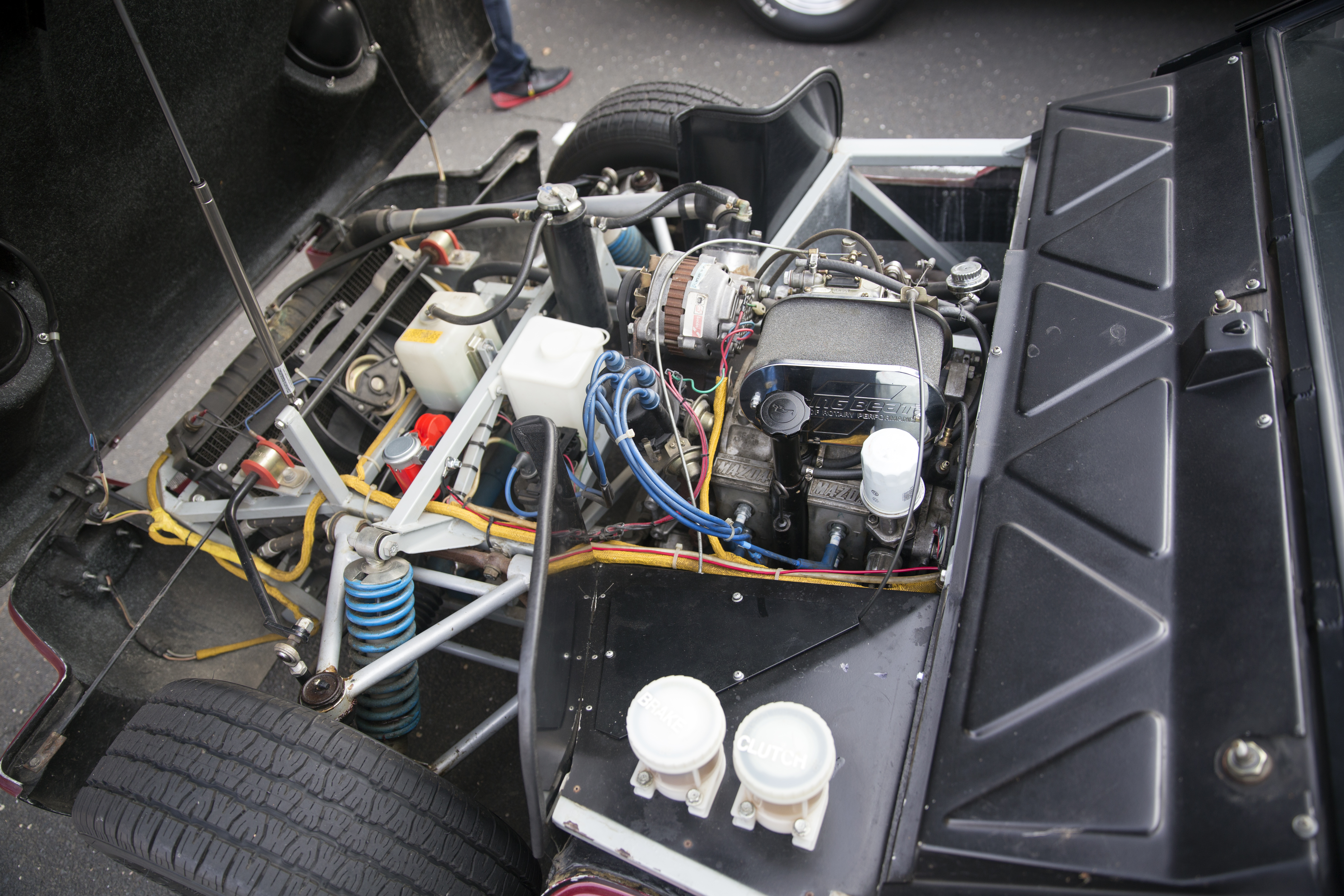
Engine compartment

The front suspension uses spindles from the Ford Mustang II, and custom fabricated A-arms. The front disc brakes are also from the Mustang II, as is the rack and pinion steering rack, which was converted from power-assisted to manual operation.

The car is designed to accept a Mazda two-rotor engine, typically either a 12A or the longer, larger displacement 13B. The car's 5-speed manual transmission and rear live axle are also Mazda parts, with the axle located by a combination of lower trailing links, upper semi-trailing links, and a Panhard rod.

On the interior is a pair of Corbeau seats with Simpson four-point racing harnesses, a set of VDO gauges, and a Neal pedal set. On the exterior, the car's taillamps are VW Bus pieces mounted sideways.

Some Rollerskates were built that had their wheelbase and corresponding overall length extended by 6 inches (15 cm).

== Technical data ==
Maxton Rollerskate:	Detail:
Engine:	Front-mid-mounted two rotor Mazda 12A or 13B engine
Chamber width x Generating radius x Eccentricity:	70 mm × 105 mm × 15 mm (2.76 in × 4.13 in × 0.59 in) (12A); 80 mm × 105 mm × 15 mm (3.15 in × 4.13 in × 0.59 in) (13B)
Displacement:	1,146 cc (69.9 cu in) (12A); 1,308 cc (79.8 cu in) (13B)
Maximum power:	135–240 bhp (100.7–179.0 kW) at 7000 rpm
Maximum torque:	140 ft⋅lb (189.8 N⋅m) at 4000 rpm (est.)
Compression ratio:	9.7:1
Ports:	Side inlet, peripheral exhaust
Induction:	Naturally aspirated, one Dell'Orto DHLA 48 carburetor
Cooling:	Water-cooled
Transmission:	5-speed manual
Steering:	Rack and pinion, 3.3 turns lock-to-lock
Brakes f/r:	9.3 in (236 mm) vented discs / 7.9 in × 1.3 in (201 mm × 33 mm) drums
Suspension front:	Upper and lower A-arms, coil-over shock absorbers, anti-roll bar
Suspension rear:	Live axle with limited slip differential. Lower trailing links and upper semi-trailing links, Panhard rod, coil-over shock absorbers, anti-roll bar
Body/Chassis:	Fiberglass body on tubular steel chassis
Track f/r:	54 1/4 / 55 3/4 in (1,378 / 1,416 mm)
Weight distribution f/r:	47%/53%
Wheelbase:	90 in (2,286 mm) (short); 96 in (2,438 mm) (long)
Fuel capacity:	11 US gal (41.6 L; 9.2 imp gal)
Wheels:	Revolution-brand 6x13 alloys
Tires f/r:	BF Goodrich Comp T/A 205/60VR-13
Length: Width: Height:	142 1/2 in (3,620 mm) (short); 148 1/2 in (3,772 mm) (long); 64 in (1,626 mm); 41 1/2 in (1,054 mm)
Weight:	1,680–1,705 lb (762.0–773.4 kg)

== Other Maxton projects ==
=== Mule and Mille Miglia ===
Prior to starting on the Rollerskate, Sutherland commissioned the design and construction of another automobile which was later intended to become Maxton's up-market model.

The first prototype of this car was designed and built by Chris Lawrence in 1986. Originally from Britain, Lawrence was known as a racing driver, engine tuner, and designer and builder of a series of racing cars he called Deep Sandersons. Lawrence counted the car he built for Sutherland among the Deep Sandersons, and called it the SL601, while Sutherland's company called it the mule. It was fitted with simple, full-width bodywork of flat planes and sharp corners.

Lawrence considered this design his most radical work ever. Starting with a simple chassis of two parallel large-diameter tubes, Lawrence installed a six-cylinder engine from a Datsun 280Z in front, and the transaxle, clutch, and flywheel from an Alfa Romeo Alfetta in back. The engine also received a Rootes-type supercharger and a 48 mm Weber carburetor.

The front has a double wishbone suspension, and the rear a De Dion suspension, but the springs and spring mounts are unusual. Two 4-inch wide transverse single leaf springs are attached to the chassis by a fitting in their centre that is able to rotate, with the front spring mounted in front of the front chassis cross-member and the rear spring behind the rear chassis cross-member. With the springs on stands, it is possible to rotate the chassis through 360° without interruption. All roll-resistance is provided by two long torsion bars running the length of the chassis, one on each side, that are attached to the suspension by 12-inch arms. The degree of roll-resistance is adjustable at each wheel by changing the location of the anchors for the torsion bars.

A second copy with a narrow roadster body and cycle fenders was built by Church Green Engineering. This car was called the Mille Miglia.

Maxton considered substituting a Rover V8 for the Nissan inline six in Mille Miglias sold in the British market.

The production Mille Miglia was to be renamed the Slingshot, but since only the prototype was built, the name change never took place.

=== Maxton GT ===
In around 1992, Maxton was also involved with another car whose development took place at least partially in England. The company released details about a planned coupe called the Maxton GT with an aluminum body and gull-wing doors. The chassis, built by Spydersport Engineering, uses much of the powertrain from the Ford Cosworth RS500, including a turbocharged Cosworth YB four cylinder engine tuned by Terry Hoyle to produce 285 PS (210 kW). The rolling GT chassis appeared on the cover of the May 1992 issue of "Cars and Car Conversions" magazine. The chassis was shipped to Sutherland in the US, then sold twice, still unbodied.

=== V12 engine ===
In autumn 1991, Maxton reported that they were considering producing their own V12 engine. Sutherland was involved in the V12 project as one of the principals of another company called JHS Engines Ltd., along with former Cosworth employees Graham Dale-Jones and Terry Hoyle. JHS acquired the rights to the Ford-Weslake engine that had originally been developed by Weslake for Ford in the early 1970s, with the intent of leasing them to John Wyer Automotive Engineering (JWAE) for use in their Gulf Mirage endurance racers.

The engine was a 3.0-litre 60° V12 with double overhead camshafts, and four valves per cylinder. After both JWAE and the Brabham F1 team evaluated the engine and rejected it, development sponsor Ford pulled out of the project. Weslake offered the design rights to Ford, who declined, but was later able to sell the rights, which were owned at different times by Jaguar-customiser Lynx Engineering and Aston Martin Lagonda. They were finally bought by JHS.

JHS undertook an extensive redesign of the engine, which included increasing displacement to 3,494 cc. Ricardo Engineering assisted JHS with development. A Group C car was built for the engine after Rubery Owen, owner of the British Racing Motors name, was persuaded to sponsor the effort and revive the BRM name. The car was dubbed the BRM P351, and the engine named the BRM Type 290. Five engines were built, each able to produce 625 bhp (466 kW) at 11,500 rpm. The P351 did poorly at Silverstone and Le Mans in 1992, and the last appearance of a Type 290 on a track was in an Arrows chassis in the 1998 and 1999 BOSS GP series.

Work also began on a V12-powered road car. Forgoing the Maxton name, this car was called the BRM P401. Power was to come from a 4.0-liter version of the Type 290 with two superchargers. This project progressed to the clay model stage.
