= Deep Sanderson =

British sports car brand

Deep Sanderson is a brand of racing and sports car that was manufactured in Britain. The cars included a series of single-seater racing cars and small sports coupés that were built and raced mainly in the early 1960s, although the name was also associated with other projects. The last Deep Sanderson was built in 1986.

== Background ==
The Deep Sandersons were designed by Chris Lawrence, who also often drove his creations in competition. Prior to building the first Deep Sanderson Lawrence had already begun to make a name for himself as a tuner of the Standard engine used in the Triumph TR sports cars and in Lawrence's own Morgan race car. Some of the Deep Sandersons were built by Lawrence and his staff, first at Westerham Motors and later at LawrenceTune Engines, while production of others was contracted out.

The name of the series is an amalgam of the name of Lawrence's father's favorite piece of music, the jazz standard "Deep Henderson", and Lawrence's mother's maiden name.

The Deep Sanderson cars were born out of Lawrence's interest in pursuing his racing career and in particular as a way to get into driving single-seaters.

== DS101 ==
Lawrence developed an interest in the relatively new Formula Junior class. The rules for this class had been laid down by Count Giovanni Lurani and were intended to create an inexpensive racing series. The rules specified that the car's suspension, engine gearbox and final drive should all come from a car produced in volume. Engines could displace either 1000 cc or 1100 cc, although there was a weight penalty for cars with the larger engines.

In 1960 Lawrence drew up a new tubular steel chassis based on a tetrahedron design that he had used for an earlier project. The front suspension was from a VW beetle, as was the transaxle. The engine was a 1000 cc 105E Ford Kent engine. Lawrence took two DS101s to the first race at Goodwood in 1960 but found that his new cars were already outmatched. Both cars retired because, according to Lawrence, while trying to follow a left-handed corner the cars' drivers would drop their car's left wheels over the edge of the tarmac, which caused the sump bung to contact the ground and unscrew itself from the sump. Lawrence rebuilt the cars, one getting an engine from Giannini of Rome, who were supplying engines for the Stanguellinis that were then dominating Formula Junior.

== DS104 ==
Lawrence then began work on a new Formula Junior car in which he would apply lessons learned from Keith Duckworth, whom he had met when picking up the engines for the DS101s. This led to his developing a unique suspension system for the car. To get more power out of the engine Lawrence drilled a hole directly down into the cylinder head and pressed a sleeve into the hole, creating a new intake port and blocking off the old at the same time. On the now high-mounted intake manifold he added a set of second-hand 45DC3 carburetors that drew cold air in over the driver's head. The VW transaxle was retained, but was mounted upside-down to drop the crankshaft below the height of the driveline. This car, christened the DS104, was taken to Silverstone for testing, where it was discovered that the crown-wheel was fitted to the wrong side of the pinion, resulting in the car having one forward gear and four reverse. The crown-wheel was subsequently moved. The DS104 debuted at Oulton Park, where it won on its first outing.

The fully restored DS104 appeared at the Goodwood track at the special "Tribute to Chris Lawrence" day on 16 June 2005.

== Lawrence Link ==
The suspension system that Lawrence developed and used first in the DS104 came to be called the "Lawrence Link" system. Lawrence recalled some late-night discussions with Keith Duckworth as being the foundations of his knowledge of suspension design and it was the principles he learned during these discussions that led him to design the suspension. The Lawrence Link was a trailing-arm suspension where the axes of the trailing links converged towards the car's centre-line. Lawrence was granted a patent for it. When his LawrenceTune Engines business ran into financial troubles in 1963, Lawrence sold the patent to Rover.

== DS301 ==
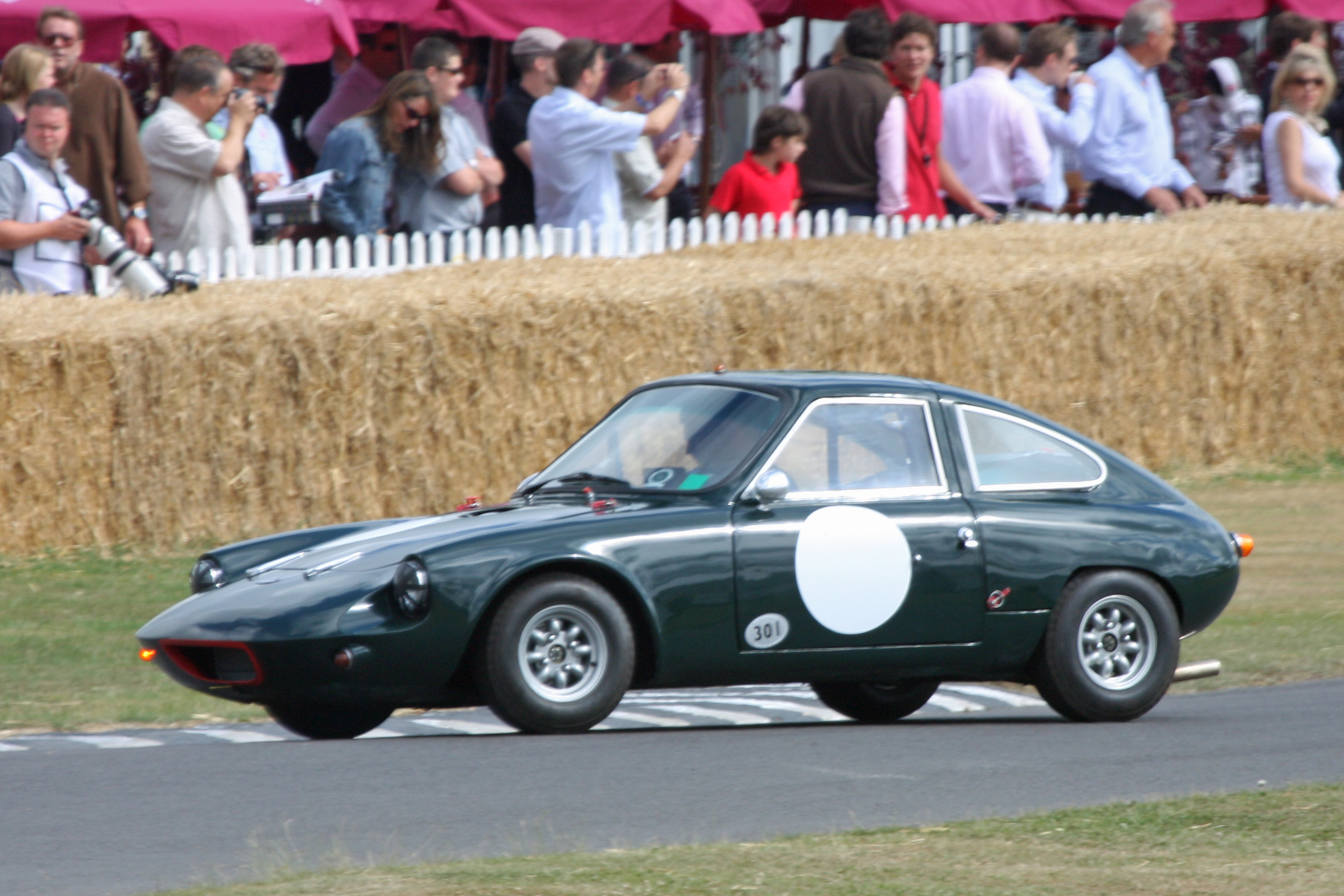
1962 Deep Sanderson 301 Coupé

The Deep Sanderson 301s were a series of a small mid-engined cars with a central tube chassis. The cars were powered by the BMC A-Series engine in various displacements and states of tune. The transmission was the transverse transaxle from the Mini.

In autumn 1960 Len Bridge urged Lawrence to develop a road-going sports car, reasoning that this market was much larger than the one for racing cars. He also strongly favoured using the Mini drivetrain as the basis for a new car. Lawrence reviewed the idea with Andrew Wallace, whom he had known while in the Navy. Wallace studied the Lawrence Link suspension and drew a chassis with a large-diameter backbone having a circular cross-section, box sections front and rear made from sheet metal and an aluminium floor reinforced by smaller square-section tubing. Suspension front and rear was by Lawrence Link. The Mini engine and transaxle were mounted amidships. Guided by Wallace's drawing, Lawrence's Westerham Motors built the prototype chassis from 20 gauge steel, which was then clothed in aluminium bodywork by Williams and Pritchard. Power was from an 850 cc Mini engine. The finished prototype had a rear engine cover as tall as the windshield in an open-topped body. The sides of the rear bodywork were made concave to narrow the back and provide some rearward visibility. Lawrence described the car, nicknamed "the perfume delivery wagon", as "ugly but functional".

Lawrence took the prototype DS301 to the Nürburgring in 1961, where the car turned in some respectable lap times before ending up in a tree. The car was retrieved but scrapped as not worth repairing, but work immediately started on a new shape for subsequent DS301s, constructing a plywood form that Williams and Pritchard would use to make a new body for the second DS301 in aluminium, like the prototype.

The plan was to display a revised DS301 at the 1962 Racing Car show in Olympia and then take the car to Le Mans the same year. The car was complete with body and paint in January 1962 when it was displayed at the Racing Car show. The new body was much more attractive than the prototype, being a compact fastback having a drag coefficient ($\scriptstyle C_\mathrm d\,$) of 0.29 and a total frontal area of 1.0 m^{2} (11 sq ft). The entire body behind the driver, almost half the length of the vehicle, tilted back for access to the engine. Returning to the Deep Sanderson display unexpectedly after the press day Lawrence found Colin Chapman and Mike Costin giving the DS301 a close inspection from inside.

After taking the car to Spa and then to the Nürburgring, the second prototype returned to England, where it was sent to the Microplas company to have a body mold taken from it so that subsequent bodies could be made in fibreglass. After the molds were made the aluminium-bodied car was prepared for the 1963 24 Hours of Le Mans.

Publicity from the car's appearance at Le Mans caused orders to start coming in to the factory for the standard 850 cc DS301. This caused a space problem for LawrenceTune, as they did not have enough room to store the parts and build the cars. A solution was presented by John Pearce, who had started working for LawrenceTune in 1962. He offered to build the DS301s as a subcontractor, even building a workshop to do the work in.

After Lawrence was in a devastating road accident in France LawrenceTune was reduced to Lawrence himself, all of the other staff having moved on and most of the assets sold. Throughout Lawrence's recuperation Pearce had continued to build and sell DS301s and paid Lawrence all of the royalties owed for 23 cars by January 1965. In 1965 Pearce purchased a commercial garage and demolished the facility where the DS301s were built, bringing an end to their production.

== DS105 ==
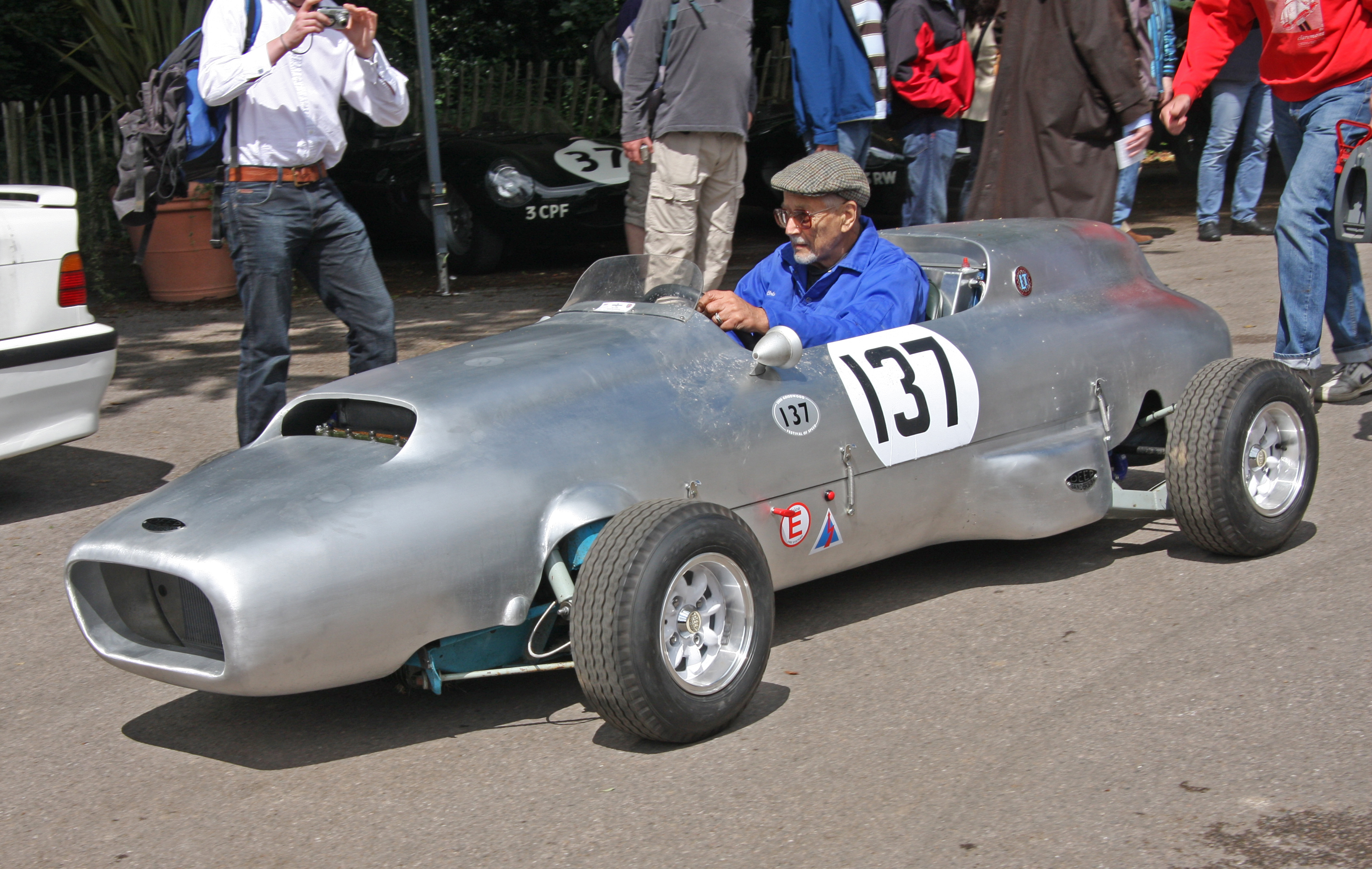
Chris Lawrence in the 1963 Deep Sanderson "Twinny"

In 1963, Lawrence inherited a project that was originally meant for Downton Engineering Works but which they were unable to undertake. Downton had convinced the client to have a car built with two engines, similar to a Mini that John Cooper had built earlier, but this one was to be a single-seat hill-climb car. Lawrence took on the job but built the car as simply as possible, installing two 1071 cc Downton-tuned Mini engines and their transaxles in a minimal chassis with a Mini subframe in the front and a Deep-Sanderson cross-member and suspension in the back. Designated the DS105, and nicknamed the "Twinny", the car debuted at Brands Hatch on Boxing Day 1963. The car raced again on Easter Monday at Mallory Park 1964. By this time a new linkage had been added that allowed the driver to vary the throttle opening between the engines, giving controlled oversteer or understeer or neutral handling as needed. The only problem was that the brakes were not up to the stresses imposed by the two engines. The car was entered in Sidney Allard's "Festival of Speed", where it performed well. It was then sold to John Pearce with the understanding that it was being resold to the United States, but this sale was never completed. The next owner was Duncan Rabagliatti.

== DS302 ==
Late in 1967 Lawrence decided to go to Le Mans again and compete in the Index of Thermal Efficiency. The engine that he would use for this was a Ford Kent 116E equipped with fuel injection from Tecalemit-Jackson, for whom LawrenceTune had become London Agents. The engine would be installed in a car that started life as a DS301, but which had its chassis lengthened and bodywork modified so that the 1600 cc Ford engine could be mounted longitudinally and drive through a Hewland FT200 five-speed transaxle. The modified car received the new designation of DS302. Lawrence contacted Rover, who had bought his patent for the Lawrence Link suspension, to let them know that he was building a new car for Le Mans and was planning on using the Lawrence Link in it. Rover refused to permit it, so the DS302 was fitted with a standard A-arm suspension in the front and a de Dion suspension at the rear. The DS302 was taken to Spa to be sorted out before going to Le Mans.

The DS302 had its Ford 116E motor replaced by an all-alloy SOHC V8 originally developed by Ted Martin for Formula 1 in anticipation of another run at Le Mans in 1969, but the car was unable to obtain an entry.

Chris Martin would personally restore the DS302 for a return to Le Mans in 2004. For this race he returned the car to its 1600 cc Kent configuration.

== At Le Mans ==
Lawrence described himself as being absolutely hooked on the 24 Hours of Le Mans race. Even after winning the 2-litre class with his Morgan in 1962 he was determined to return in a car of his own design.

The aluminium-bodied DS301 coupé was entered to run in the 1000 cc class at the 1963 24 Hours of Le Mans. Power would come from a 997 cc engine fed by a 45 mm Weber carburetor and tuned by Downton. Other changes for Le Mans included switching to Mini Cooper front disc brakes, fabricating a 95.5 L (21 imp gal) fuel tank for the front of the car and building a recessed luggage shelf to accommodate the requisite FIA suitcase. The drivers were Lawrence and Christopher Spender, with Lawrence taking the opening shift. The car was able to do over 241.4 km/h (150 mph) down the Mulsanne straight. At one point the car went into a sand-pit and was freed by the driver but shortly after that the brakes failed while Lawrence was driving. He believed that sand in the brakes had overheated the seals and melted them, causing all of the brake fluid in the single-circuit system to leak out. Lawrence continued in the car, coasting, sliding and using the clutch to scrub off speed when necessary and managed to climb back through the field to the point where he was on the same lap as the leading Alpine Renault when the DS301 was black-flagged. The car was disqualified for being below their minimum average speed at midnight, 12 hours earlier. Another DS301 was entered in the 1963 race, fielded by Equipe Lausannoise and to be driven by Bernard Collomb. The car is listed as not showing up.

Lawrence applied to run again at Le Mans in 1964 and was accepted. This time he would field a two-car team, with the aluminium-bodied DS301 joined by a fibreglass-bodied version. Downton was to prepare two new 1325 cc engines, enlarged from 1275 cc, but were unable to do the work and transferred the work to the BMC racing department at Abingdon who eventually delivered two 1293 cc engines. Prior to the race the two cars were not running well, so time was spent re-jetting the carburetors. Immediately after this one Deep Sanderson was destroyed in an accident while still in practice. The second, being driven by Lawrence and Gordon Spice, started poorly and then retired in the third hour of the race with a blown cylinder head gasket.

The next appearance by Lawrence in a Deep Sanderson at Le Mans was in 1968. This time the car was the DS302 and John Wingfield was co-driver. During practice the car developed an oil leak which prompted the team to replace all of the engine's main bearings. On race day the car started well, but once again the team was disqualified. This time the disqualification was due to the driver traveling more than 100 metres away from the vehicle. The reason that the car was stopped and the driver was out was that he was looking for the fuel-injection pump's drive belt, which had been knocked off by debris on the track from another car.

In 2004 Lawrence staged another Deep Sanderson run at Le Mans, this time at the Le Mans Classic race. Lawrence built up a DS301 from an unused shell. For a second car Lawrence arranged to borrow the DS302, then owned by Peter Dodds. He removed the Martin V8 and reinstalled a 1600 cc engine like that used in 1968. Robin Gray and Henri Szykowski were invited to drive the DS301, and Mark Baldwin and Tom Hollfelder to drive the DS302. The DS301 ran flawlessly and, after some drama in qualifying, so did the DS302.

== Monica ==
Although not officially a Deep Sanderson project, early prototypes of the Monica sedan were badged as Deep Sandersons. This was done to conceal the cars' true identity rather than to indicate any connection to the earlier DS cars. The first two Monica prototypes were also registered as Deep Sandersons for road use, receiving registration numbers 1 ARX and 2 ARX respectively.

== SL601 ==
Although Lawrence worked on many projects after the DS302, including the Triumph and Morgan SLRs, it was not until 1986 that he built what he considered the next and last Deep Sanderson. This car received the designation SL601 and was built while Lawrence was living and working in the United States. The SL601 was built for businessman and auto collector Robert Sutherland, who went on to become the principal backer of the Maxton Rollerskate.

Sutherland asked Lawrence to design and build a simple prototype for a car that could be built in small numbers. Lawrence considered the design he produced his most radical work ever. Starting with a simple chassis of two parallel large-diameter tubes Lawrence installed the engine from a Datsun 280Z in front and the transaxle, clutch and flywheel from an Alfa Romeo Alfetta in rear. The engine also received a Rootes-type supercharger and a 48 mm Weber carburetor. The front suspension was upper and lower A-arms and the rear was a de Dion system, but it was what Lawrence did for springs that made it notable. The springs front and rear were 4-inch wide single leaf units attached to the chassis by a fitting in their centre that was able to rotate, and which put the front spring in front of the front chassis cross-member and the rear spring behind the rear chassis cross-member. That means that if the springs were on stands it was theoretically possible to rotate the chassis through 360°. All of the roll-resistance was provided by two long torsion bars running the length of the chassis, one on each side, that were attached to the suspension by 12-inch arms. The strength of roll-resistance was adjustable at each wheel by changing the location of the anchors for the torsion bars. To make the car roadworthy it received simple Lotus 7-style bodywork widened to fit the chassis and Morgan-style front fenders.

Lawrence entrusted testing of the SL601 to his step-son and arranged for him to go to Willow Springs Racetrack to put in some laps, after telling the track owner that the step-son was not a race driver but would try to stay out of the way of faster traffic. The owner called Lawrence late in the second day to say that his step-son was lapping the track at times that were two to three seconds under the track's Formula Ford record.
