= Chris Lawrence (racing driver) =

British racing driver (1933–2011)

- Born: 27 July 1933; Ealing, London, England
- Died: 13 August 2011 (aged 78); Burghill, Herefordshire, England

Formula One World Championship career
- Nationality: (United Kingdom) British
- Active years: 1966
- Team: non-works Cooper
- Entries: 2
- Championships: 0
- Wins: 0
- Podiums: 0
- Career points: 0
- Pole positions: 0
- Fastest laps: 0
- First entry: 1966 British Grand Prix
- Last entry: 1966 German Grand Prix

Christopher John Lawrence (27 July 1933 – 13 August 2011) was a British former racing driver from England. Born in Ealing, London, he participated regularly in the Le Mans 24 Hours race and in two World Championship Formula One Grands Prix, driving a special Cooper-Ferrari, debuting on 16 July 1966. He scored no championship points.

Lawrence later founded the London-based company LawrenceTune, constructors of the Morgan +4 Super Sports (racing version).

Lawrence was also responsible for designing the Deep Sanderson series of racing and sports cars.

In addition, Lawrence also helped design the 1972 Monica 560 luxury French saloon.

Lawrence died of cancer aged 78.

== Racing record ==
=== Complete British Saloon Car Championship results ===
(key) (Races in bold indicate pole position; races in italics indicate fastest lap.)

Year	Team	Car	Class	1	2	3	4	5	6	7	8	9	10	11	DC	Pts	Class
1963	Lawrencetune Engines	Vauxhall VX4/90	B	SNE	OUL	GOO	AIN	SIL	CRY	SIL; DNS	BRH	BRH	OUL	SNE	NC	0	NC

=== Complete Formula One World Championship results ===
(key)

Year	Entrant	Chassis	Engine	1	2	3	4	5	6	7	8	9	WDC	Points
1966	J.A. Pearce Engineering Ltd	Cooper T73	Ferrari V12	MON	BEL	FRA	GBR; 11	NED	GER; Ret	ITA	USA	MEX	NC	0
