= Charles Deutsch =

French engineer and automobile maker

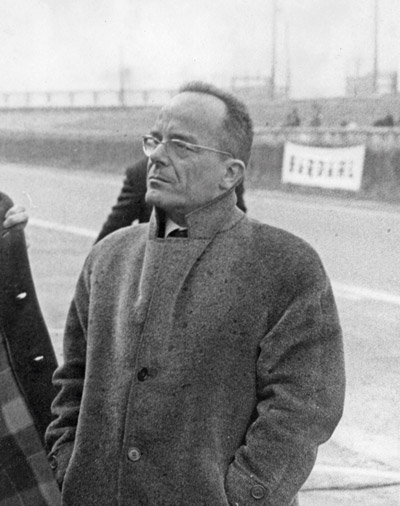
- Born: 6 September 1911; Champigny-sur-Marne
- Died: 6 December 1980 (aged 69)
- Education: École Polytechnique
- Engineering career
- Institutions: 24 Hours of Le Mans, 1969-80; FISITA, 1975-78
- Employers: Ponts et Chaussées, DB, CD/Sera-CD
- Projects: DB HBR
- Significant advance: Automotive aerodynamics

Charles Deutsch (1911–1980) was a French aerodynamics engineer and automobile maker, founder of the brand "DB" with René Bonnet, and later of the "CD".

== Early history ==
Deutsch was born at Champigny-sur-Marne on 6 September 1911. His father was a cartwright who had also expanded into manufacturing automobile bodies on a small scale in the early 1900s. The young Deutsch proceeded to learn his father's business from the ground up, a knowledge set complemented by a degree from the prestigious École Polytechnique. Deutsch senior died in 1929, leaving the eighteen-year-old Charles in charge of the business while also pursuing his studies. This proved unfeasible, and in 1932 he sold the business to a René Bonnet, while continuing to live upstairs and maintaining a day-to-day involvement in the charronnerie-carrosserie.

Charles Deutsch himself states that he was only fourteen when he designed his first car, which was built in his father's shop. After a promised ride for Bonnet in the 1936 French Grand Prix failed to materialize, Deutsch and Bonnet proceeded to design their own car - using Citroën parts - which they competed with some success. This was D.B. 1, which gave rise to the DB company which lasted until 1961. After the breakup of the company, Deutsch proceeded to build a small number of lightweight, aerodynamic, front-wheel drive sports cars under the CD (sometimes referred to as CD-Panhard, since they depended on Panhard engines). Together with Jean Bertin, Deutsch also worked on solving the Facellia's cooling problems as well as on a more powerful twin-carburetted version.

In 1935 Deutsch began working for the Ponts et Chaussées, the French highway and bridge authority. He continued working full-time as a civil engineer, becoming chief engineer in 1951, while also running a competition car company and raising a family. In 1966 Deutsch retired from the Ponts et Chaussées and proceeded to dedicate his entire time to his engineering firm.

== Career ==
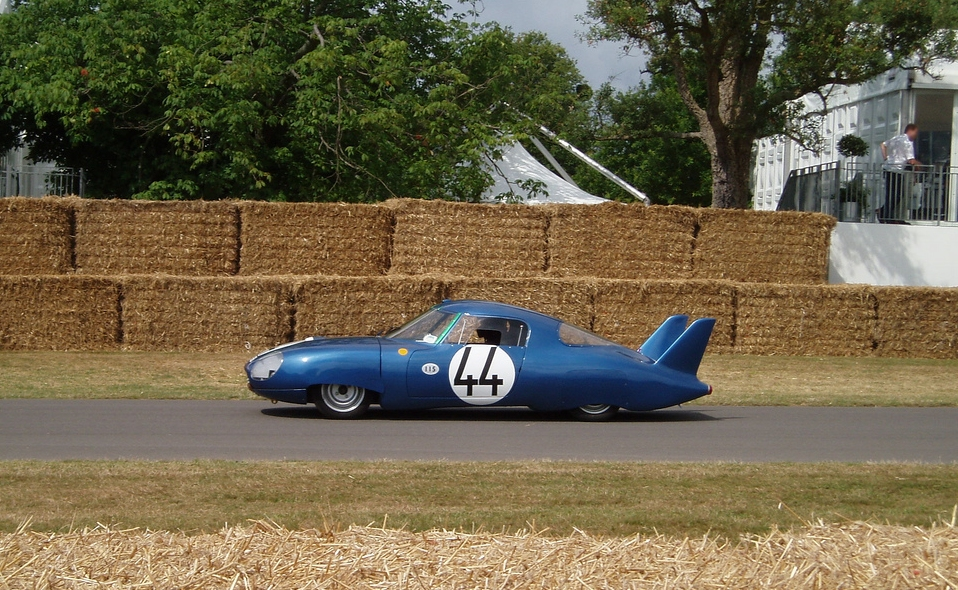
The CD Panhard LM64 of 1964

Educated at the École Polytechnique, Deutsch was a pioneer in the field of aerodynamics, and founded the Sera-CD vehicle engineering Research and Development Company (Société d’Etudes et de Réalisations Automobiles - Charles Deutsch). He used the ground-effect on race cars ten years before Chaparral and his #53 entry from "Automobiles Deutsch et Bonnet" won the "Index of Performance" trophy at the 1961 24 Hours of Le Mans. The Alpine M64 which won the Index of Thermal Performance at the 1964 Le Mans also had bodywork designed by Deutsch.

Deutsch served as President of the Société des ingénieurs de l'automobile from 1971 until 1975, followed by holding the presidency of FISITA, the International Federation of Automotive Engineering Societies, until 1978. He was also the race director of the 24 Hours of Le Mans (from 1969 until 1980) and of the Grand Prix of Monaco. French aerodynamics engineer Robert Choulet (École Centrale Paris) is Deutsch's most famous disciple.

Although Deutsch died in 1980, Sera-CD continues research and development to this day, from light to heavy vehicles using conventional and hybrid propulsion technology. On 23 April 2007 it was acquired by Sogeclair.
