= DB HBR 5 =

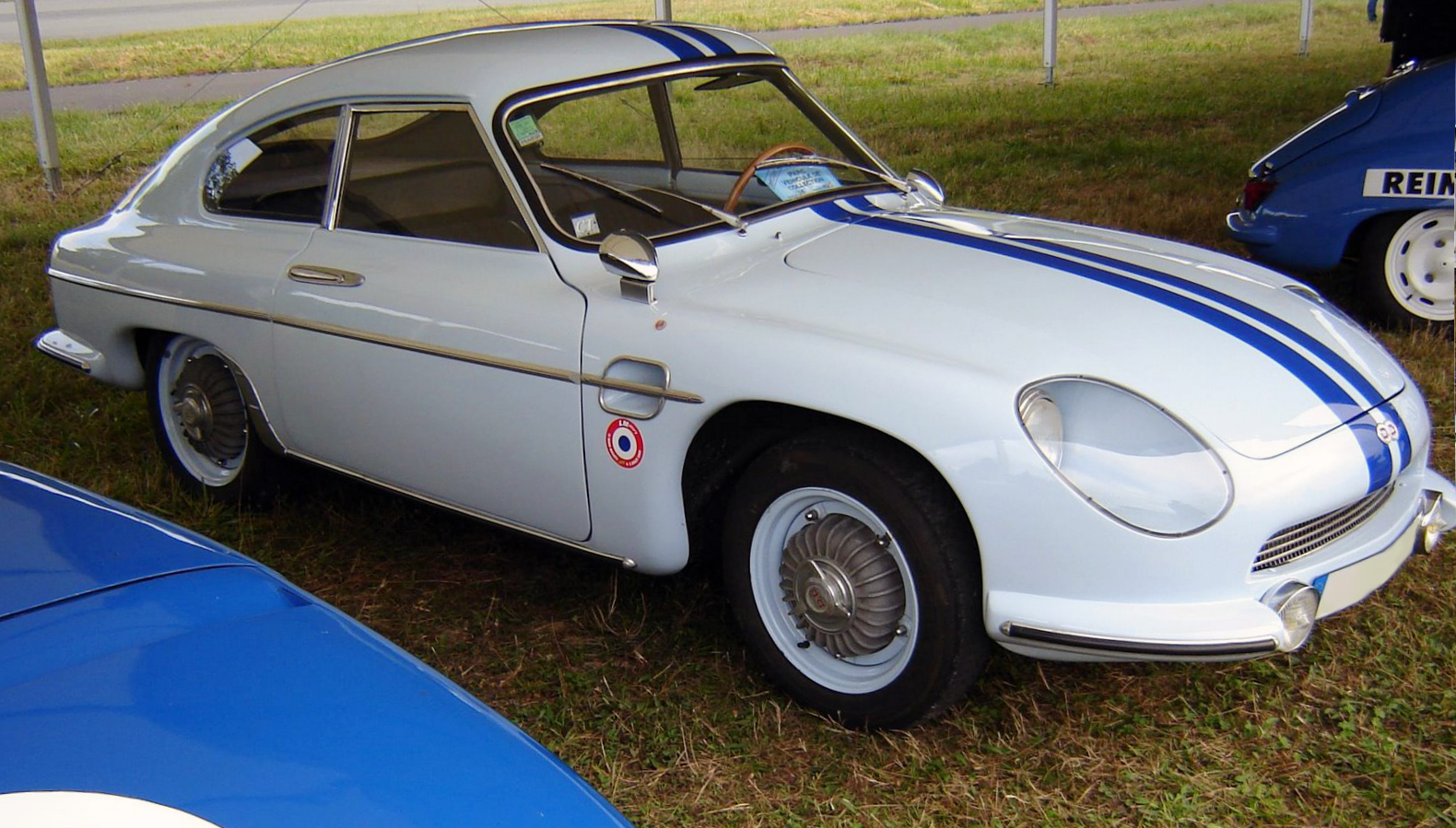

Overview
- Manufacturer: DB (Deutsch-Bonnet)
- Also called: DB Coach; DB HBR 4
- Production: 1955–1961

Body and chassis
- Class: Sports car

Powertrain
- Engine: 745 cc (45.5 cu in) Panhard boxer 2 (HBR 4); 848 cc (51.7 cu in) Panhard boxer 2; 954 cc (58.2 cu in) Panhard boxer 2

Dimensions
- Wheelbase: 2,130 mm (84 in)
- Length: 3,950 mm (156 in)
- Width: 1,580 mm (62 in)
- Height: 1,340 mm (53 in); 1,190 mm (47 in) (Super Rallye)
- Curb weight: 584 kg (1,287 lb) (Super Rallye)

Chronology
- Successor: CD Dyna

The HBR 5 model (1954–1959) was Deutsch and Bonnet's (DB) most successful project, with several hundred of the cars produced until 1959. Another small series of lowered and lightened cars called "Super Rallye" occurred in 1960 and 1961. Around 660 of the Mille Miles, Coach, and HBR 4/5s were built in total. Other sources (a count by the DB-Panhard clubs of France, Germany, Switzerland, and the US) account for 950 DB coupés, of which nearly all would be HBRs and their Frua-designed predecessors.

== Predecessors ==
A very few Antem-built Coaches (coupés) were built in aluminium in 1952, mostly for competition purposes. Most of the Antem-bodied DB road cars were cabriolets.

This early feeler from DB was succeeded by the steel-bodied Frua-designed coupé "Mille Miles" (celebrating class victories at the Mille Miglia), a mini-GT with a 65 hp 850 cc Panhard two-cylinder. It was of rather square-rigged appearance, with a split windshield, a low grille, and three portholes on the fenders. A 750 cc version was also offered, with available supercharging. 32 of the DB-Frua Mille Miles were built, from October 1952 until the end of 1953.

== History ==
The HBR was introduced as the "DB Coach" at the 1954 Paris Salon, and production started in January 1955. An early prototype with a body made of Duralinox aluminium-magnesium alloy had been shown at the 1953 Paris Salon, but putting the car into production took some time. The early Chausson designs received retractable headlamps and often the front portion of the roof is plexiglass. This plexiglass sunroof, with a removable inner cover, continued to be available throughout the HBR's life. Chausson built the fibreglass body; this was considered an experience-gaining effort and DB was charged a very modest per-unit price. The first hundred interim cars were built by Chausson, after which, experiment over, they sold the tooling to Deutsch and Bonnet themselves. They in turn turned the equipment over to another bodybuilding company which proceeded to sell the finished bodies to DB, meaning DB got into the car manufacturing business at a minimal cost. The first Coach/HBR had a 50 CV (37 kW) version of the 848 cc Panhard Dyna engine with twin Solex carburettors. Early models, show cars in particular, also often exhibited luxurious equipment with much chrome and two-tone paintjobs.

Until about 1957 the shift pattern (cable actuated) of the four-speed gearbox was offset by ninety degrees from the norm.

About 430 of the standard HBR 5 were built, complemented in 1960 and 1961 by another ten "HBR 5 Super Rallye"s - these were essentially chopped and sectioned competition versions of the "regular" HBR 5. Later versions could be equipped with engines of 1 and 1.3 litres, and superchargers were also available. As with most DBs, excepting the early Citroën-engined cars, the HBRs were all equipped with modified Panhard flat-two engines and other technology. The HBR 5 was the second fibreglass-bodied car to have entered series production, if such a thing can indeed be said about any of DB's products - no two cars may have been alike, as they were built according to customer specifications from a wide range of options.

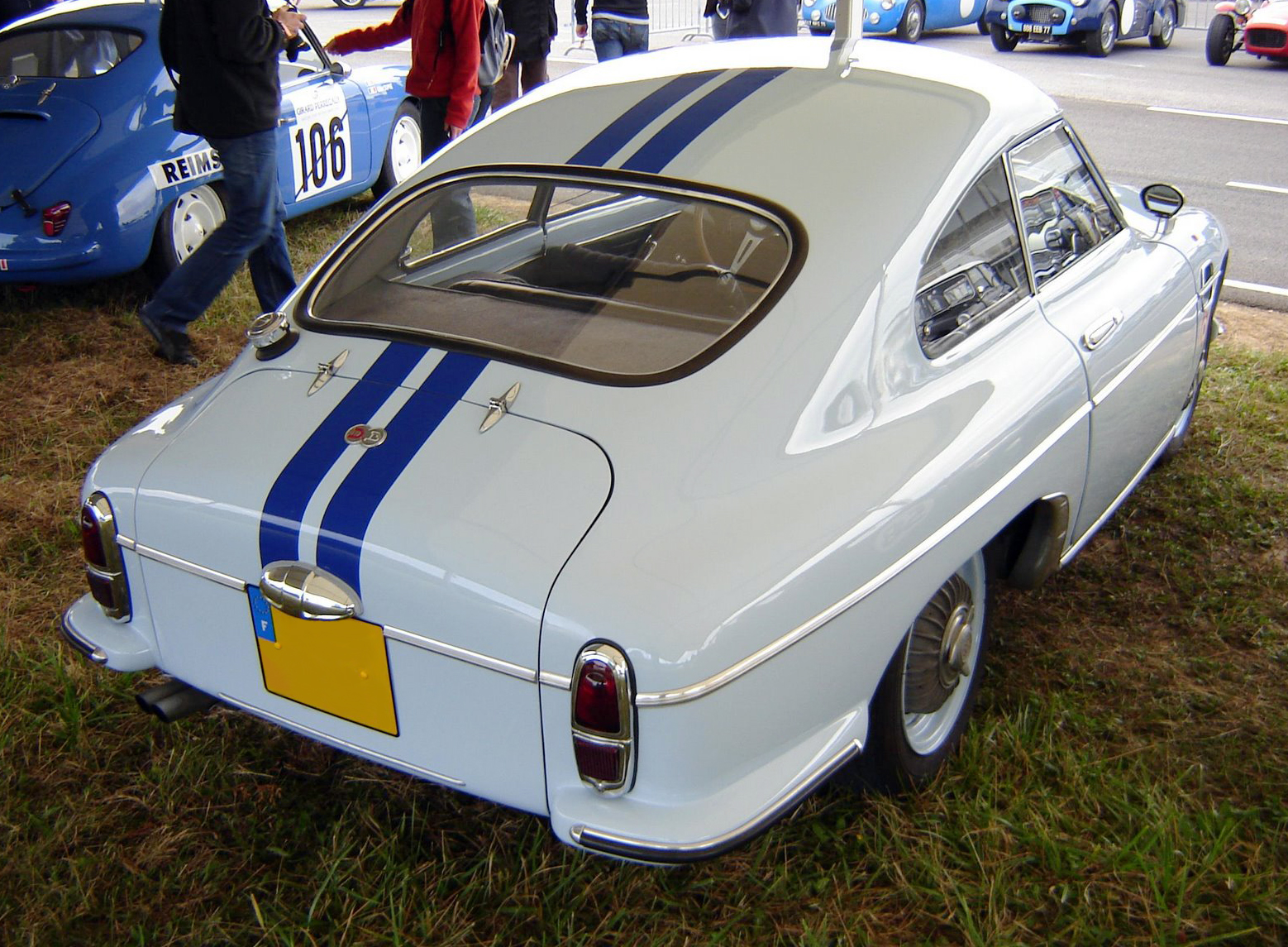
Rear view of 1959 HBR 5, showing the Peugeot 403 taillights

The HBR 5 was complemented by the less sporting Le Mans (1958–1964), after which the DB brand was broken up into CD and René Bonnet. What had been intended to be called the HBR 6 instead became the CD Dyna (for "Charles Deutsch") while Bonnet focused on Renault-based cars. Cars equipped with the 745 cc engine were called "HBR 4", to reflect that they were in the 4CV (tax horsepower) category of the French taxation system. The bigger engined cars were 5CV, hence their name. While Panhard's original engine was of 851 cc, DB used a version downsleeved minimally, to 848 cc. This was to suit competition regulations.

The Super Rallye was lowered by 15 centimetres (6 in), had a more steeply raked windshield, a higher aluminium content, and plexiglass side windows - all in the name of aerodynamics and lower weight. In addition to the ten regular series cars, an additional car was built from a 1962 Le Mans Coach. The Super Rallye was often seen in racing, having partaken in the 1960 and 1961 Le Mans 24 Hours, the 1961 Rallye Monte Carlo, in the Tour de France Automobile, and countless lesser regional races. A 1960 Super Rallye with the 954 cc option (and twin Zenith carburetors) offered 72 CV (53 kW) at 6000 rpm and a top speed of 175 km/h (109 mph). The smaller HBR 4 was also raced at Le Mans and elsewhere, often with even lighter roadster bodies.

== Competition ==
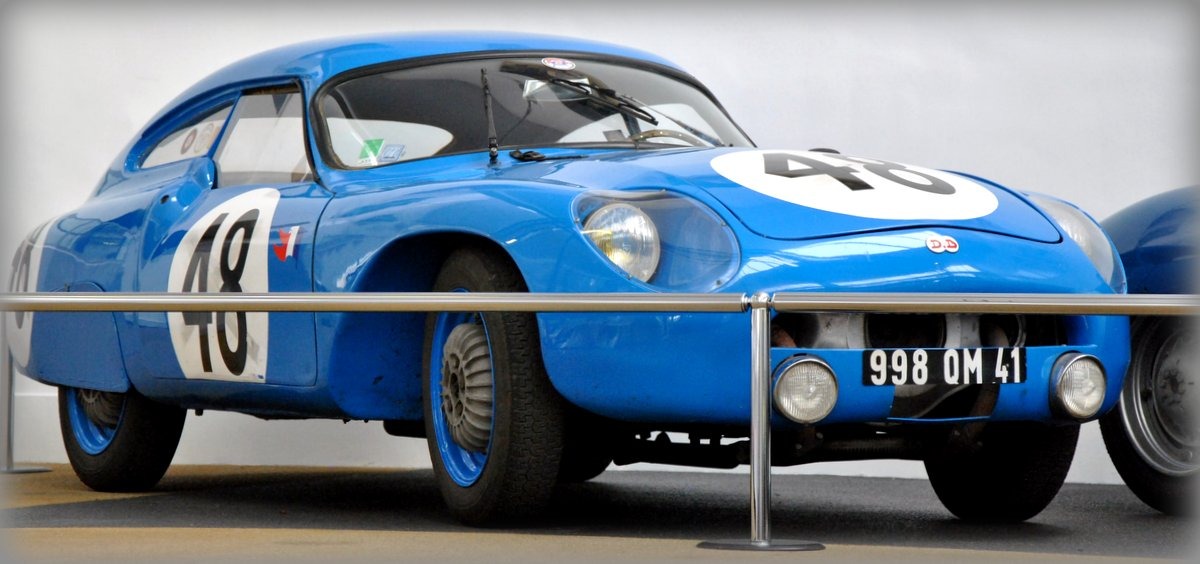
A special bodied 1959 HBR4 ("le Monstre") which partook in the Tour de France, Le Mans, and many other races

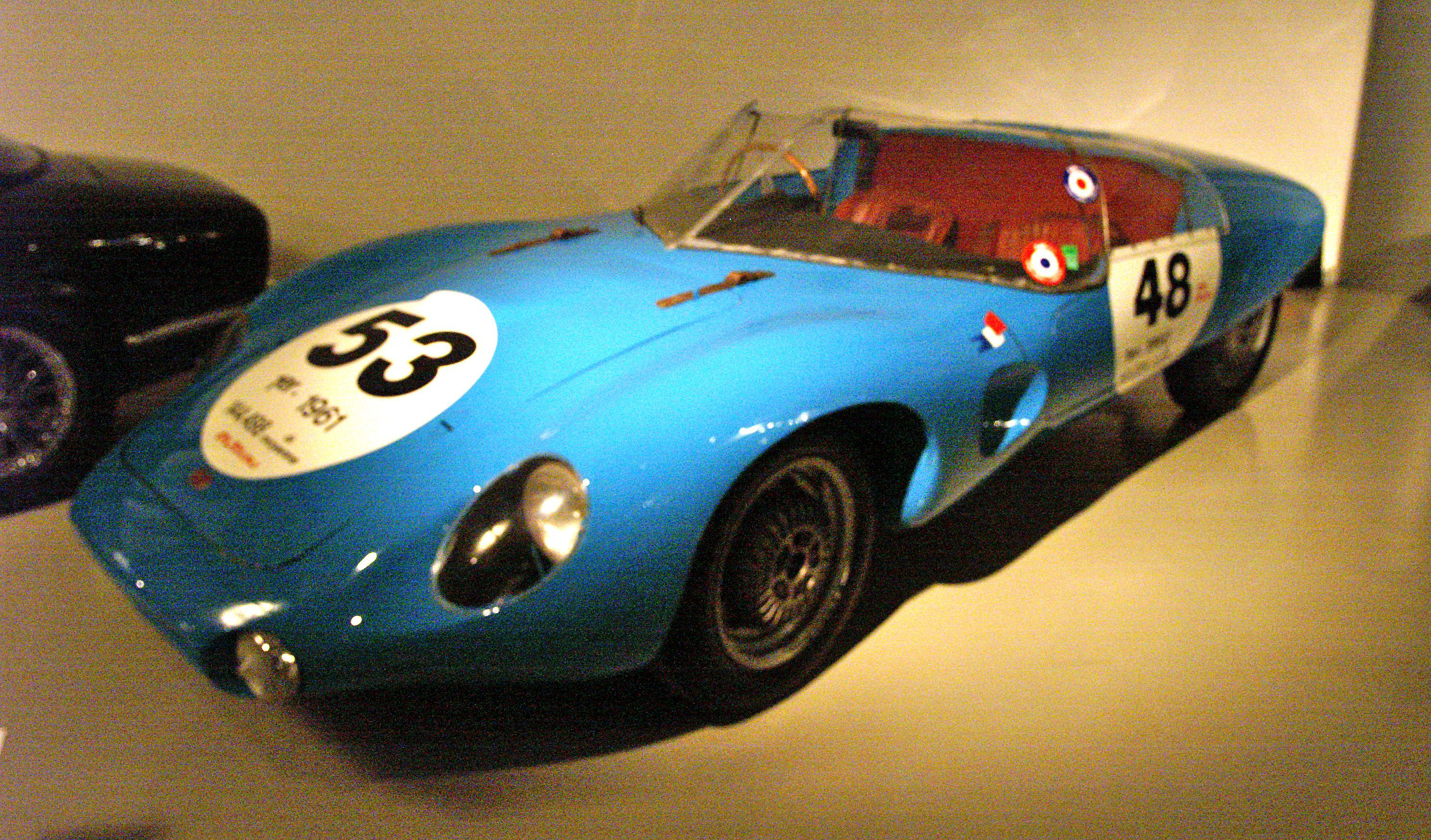
This car finished 15th at LeMans in 1960 and 19th in 1961, winning the Index of Performance both years.

The HBR-series was constructed with one main target: small displacement, long distance competition. Any concessions to comfort were there to meet regulations, and also to accommodate those drivers who had to go to and from the track in their racing car. One of the HBR's best outings was at the 1954 Le Mans, where René Bonnet himself - together with racing legend Élie Bayol finished tenth overall. The other HBR also finished (in 16th), while three Renault-engined central-seater DB designs all failed to complete the race. DB proceeded to focus on Panhard designs exclusively. The HBR 4 (745 cc) won the Index of Performance at Le Mans 1956 (Laureau-Armagnac) and came in second in 1958. In 1959 they won both the Index of Performance and the Index of Efficiency, with one car finishing ninth overall. DB HBRs won the Index of Performance again in 1960 and 1961 (with the same car which won in 1959) The same cars were often converted to barquette (roadster) specifications to make them lighter yet, although the roofed models benefited from lower drag. The HBR was also popular in American SCCA club racing as well as long distance races across the world.
