= Panhard CD =

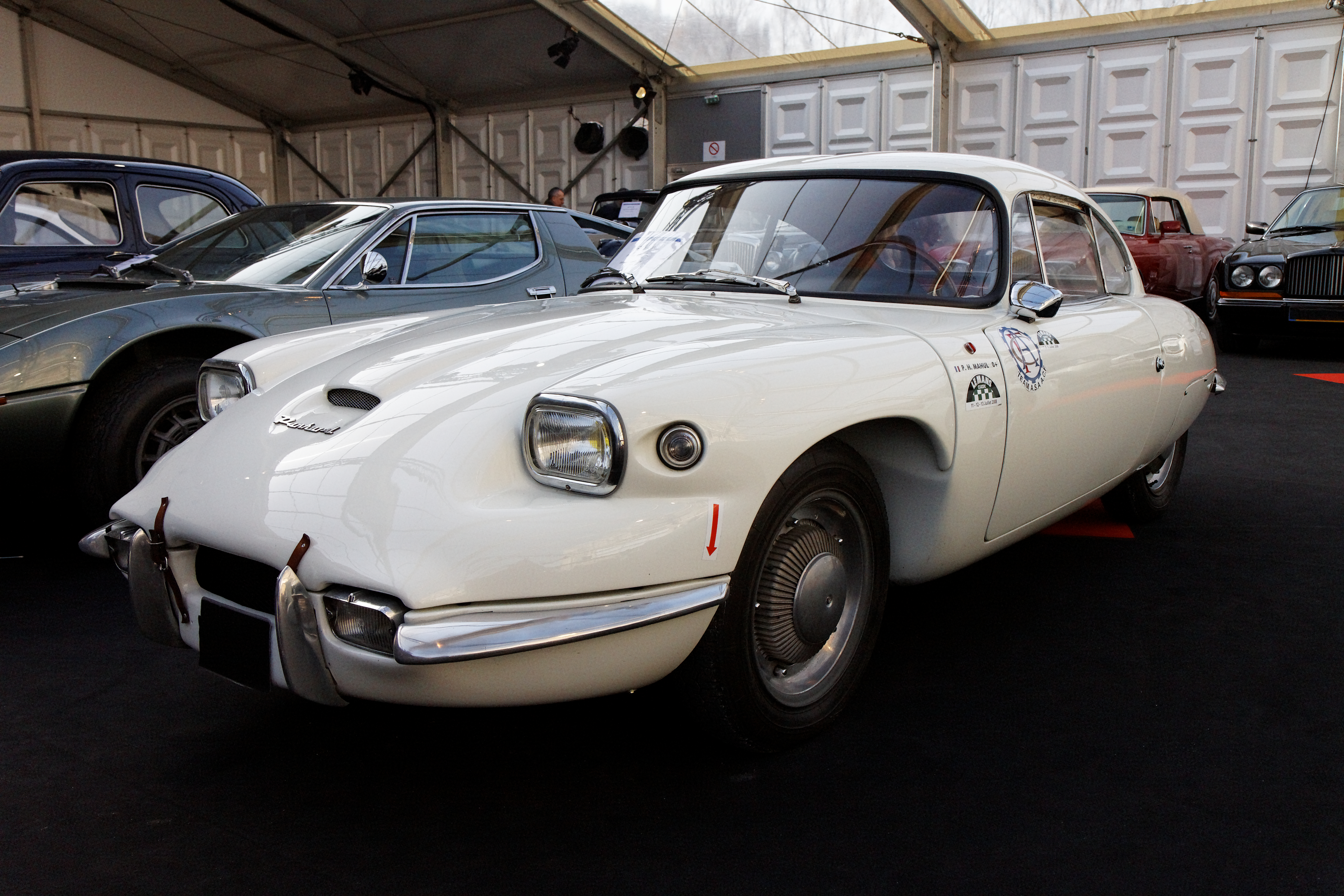
- Panhard CD

Overview
- Manufacturer: Panhard
- Production: 1962–1965
- Assembly: France
- Designer: Charles Deutsch

Body and chassis
- Class: Grand Tourer
- Body style: 2-door coupé
- Layout: Front-engine, front-wheel drive

Powertrain
- Engine: 848 cc (51.7 cu in) air-cooled ohv boxer twin
- Transmission: 4-speed manual

Dimensions
- Wheelbase: 2,250 mm (88.6 in)
- Length: 4,060 mm (159.8 in)
- Width: 1,600 mm (63.0 in)
- Height: 1,185 mm (46.7 in)
- Kerb weight: 580 kg (1,279 lb)

Chronology
- Predecessor: DB HBR 5 Panhard Dyna Junior
- Successor: Panhard 24; Citroën SM

The Panhard CD is a car designed by Charles Deutsch and built by Panhard from 1963 to 1965. The CD was named for Deutsch and is considered a continuation of the line of Panhard-powered vehicles built by Deutsch-Bonnet. The car was the production version of the CD Dyna that raced at Le Mans in June 1962.

== The CD Dyna ==
At the end of 1961, the partnership between French engineer and aerodynamicist Charles Deutsch and his longtime collaborator René Bonnet ended. Shortly afterwards, French automaker Panhard approached Deutsch to design a successor to his DB HBR 5 for the 1962 24 Hours of Le Mans. While this would be Deutsch's first solo project, he had already designed cars with Panhard components, and a detailed drawing of a car that anticipated the CD Dyna, and may have been a planned HBR 6, dates from as early as October 19, 1960.

Panhard gave approval for work to start on the car at the end of January 1962, and factory manager Etienne de Valance began to build a team of drivers.

Five cars were built; one prototype with a body of hand-hammered steel and four more with bodywork in glass-reinforced plastic (GRP) by Chappe et Gessalin. A tubular steel space-frame was considered but the car would instead get a steel backbone chassis. The first car, chassis number 101, was finished in just 70 days. The next four cars were given designations 102 through 105.

The car was variously called the CD-Panhard coach, the Panhard et Levassor CD Le Mans and the CD-Panhard Dyna Coupé, but in the results of the 1962 24 Heures du Mans it is listed as the CD Dyna.

The design of the body was handled by Deutsch and aerodynamicist Lucien Romani along with his protégé Marcel Hubert.

The engines were the air-cooled boxer twins designed by Panhard's Louis Delagarde and tuned by Deutsch and Société Moteur Moderne. Power was boosted by means of enlarged valves, a higher-lift camshaft and two Zenith down-draught carburetors. While the first engine built had also been enlarged to 954 cc the Le Mans cars would all have a smaller 702 cc engine. The car's transaxle was from the Panhard PL 17.

=== Racing the CD Dyna ===
The coupé first appeared at the Le Mans test days in April 1962, where the car was registered in the class for prototypes with engines of up to 850 cc (51.9 cu in). Drivers Pierre Lelong and Bernard Boyer posted the 20th and 21st best times of the day.

On 27 May 1962, chassis 101 and 102 were brought to the 1000 km of Nürburgring. Chassis 101 was driven by the team of André Guilhaudin and Bernard Boyer and chassis 102 by Jean-Pierre Hanrioud and Alain Bertaut. The Hanrioud/Bertaut car did not finish due to an accident, but the Guilhaudin/Boyer car finished in 24th place overall.

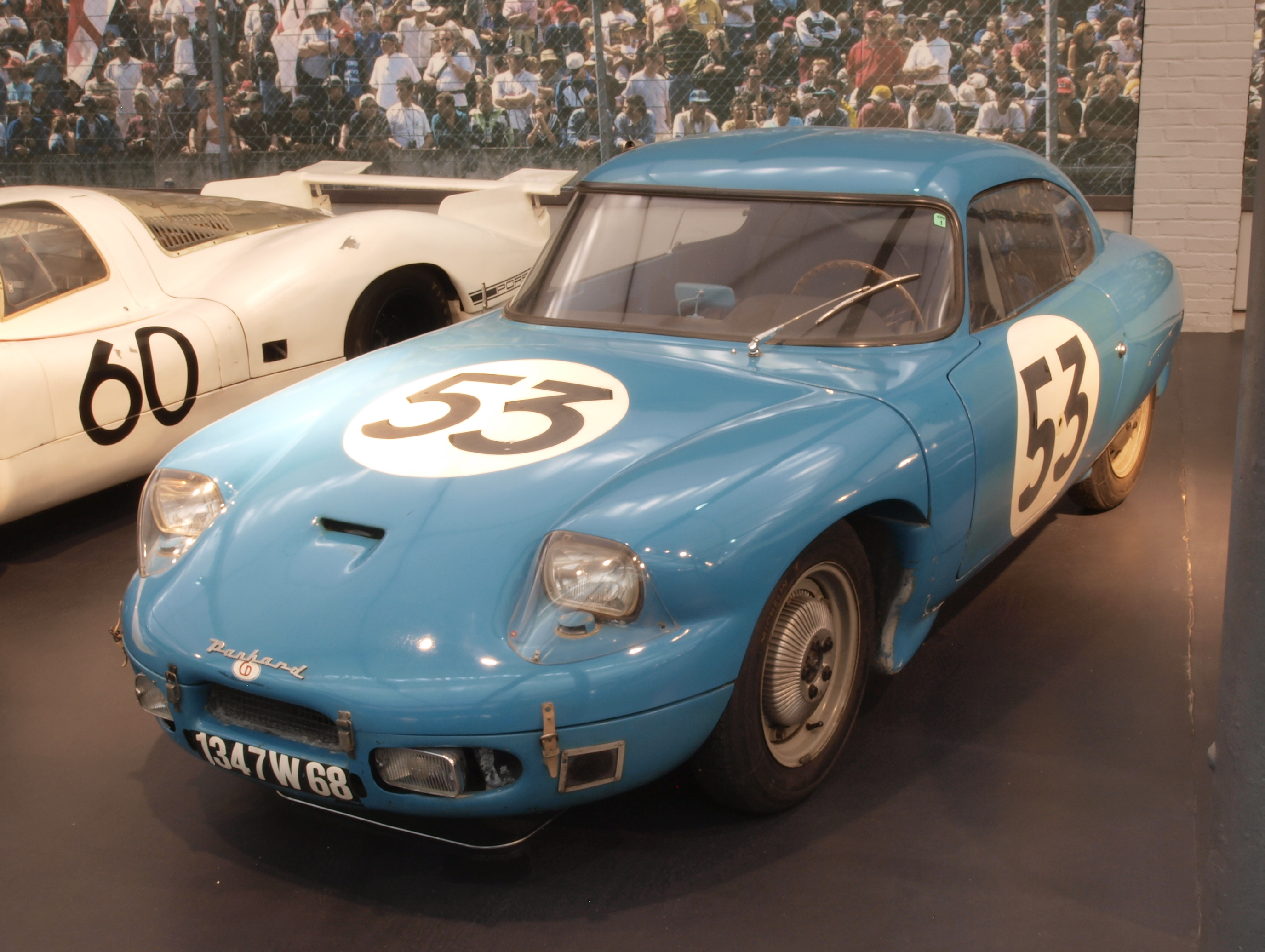
CD Dyna Number 53

Four cars were entered for the 24 Heures du Mans of June 23 and 24 1962. Chassis 103 received number 53 and was driven by the team of André Guilhaudin and André Bertaut. Chassis 104 received number 54 and was driven by Pierre Lelong and Jean-Pierre Hanrioud. Chassis 105 received number 55 and was driven by Bernard Boyer and Guy Verrier. A car that is believed to have been chassis 102 received number 70 and was to have been driven by Robert Neyret and Robert Mougin but the car did not arrive.

Number 54 was eliminated in the ninth hour of the race due to an accident in which the car overturned and caught fire. Hanrioud, who was driving at the time, managed to walk away from the crash. Boyer and Verrier in number 55 retired in the fourteenth hour with an overheated engine.

Number 53, driven by Bertaut and Guildaudin, finished 16th overall and won its class and the "Indice de Performance". The car also placed third in the "Indice au rendement énergetique", or consumption index, with an average of 11.4 L/100 km (24.8 mpg_{‑imp}; 20.6 mpg_{‑US}) with a 590 kg (1,300.7 lb) vehicle weight. Guilhaudin and Bertaut's average speed over the entire race at was 142.793 km/h (88.7 mph), while their fastest lap took 5 minutes 22 seconds with a speed of 160.403 km/h (99.7 mph).

On 16 September, Deutsch brought a CD Dyna with a modified engine and some additional aerodynamic changes to the Hunaudières straight where the car reached a top speed of 204 km/h (126.8 mph).

In 21 October 21 1962, drivers André Guilhaudin and Alain Bertaut finished in 20th position at the 1000 km race of Paris. This was the end of the Dyna Coupés' racing career.

== The production Panhard CD ==
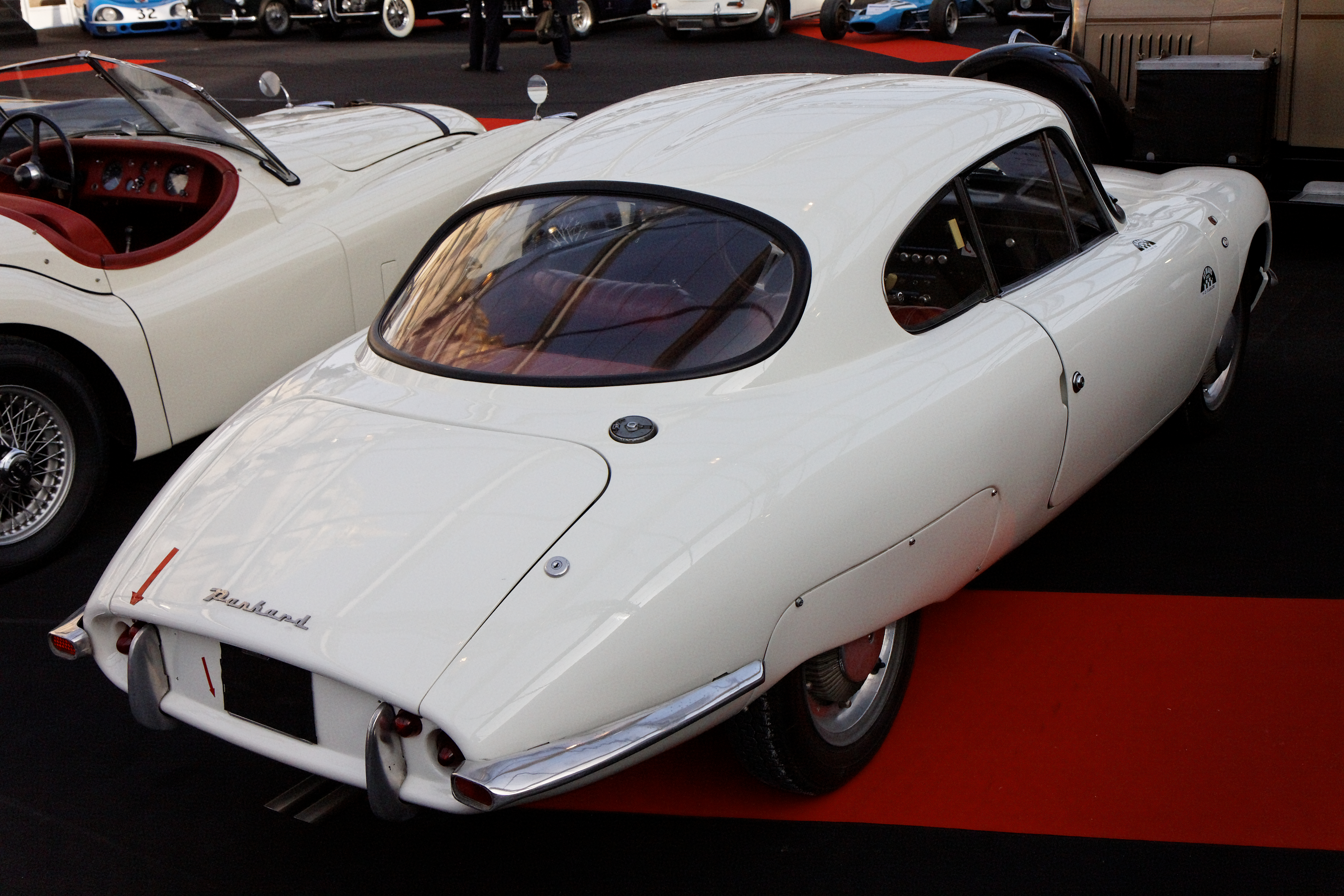
Rear three-quarter view

The Panhard CD inherited its Grand Touring coupé body with distinctive tapering rear and "double-bubble" roof from the CD Dyna. The lightweight body was made of fibreglass, which lent itself to the curvy shape and the economies of a small production run of vehicles. Deutsch and Romani had sculpted a form that was extremely aerodynamic, with a drag coefficient ($\scriptstyle C_\mathrm d\,$) of 0.22. The body was mounted on a torsionally-rigid central backbone frame that followed the pattern set by earlier DB designs. The complete chassis weighed 40 kg (88.2 lb). The front bodywork was a single piece that tilted up and back to expose the front chassis and entire drive-train.

The CD was sold in two trim levels; GT and Rallye. The GT sold for 15,500 francs, and the Rallye for 16,500 francs. The engine in both was Panhard's 848 cc (51.7 cu in) M5-T "Tigre". The engine in the GT was a standard model fed by a single Zenith type 38 NDIX down-draught carburetor that made 36.5 kW (49 hp). The Rallye model had two carburetors and produced about 44.0 kW (59 hp). The four-speed gearbox was a Panhard component with a direct-drive third gear and overdrive fourth that drove the front wheels. The transmissions in the Rallye versions had a final-drive ratio almost 10% "taller" (numerically lower) than the GT. Top speed for the GT was 165 km/h, and 180 km/h for the Rallye. Suspension was independent at all four corners. The front suspension comprised lower A-arms and an upper transverse leaf spring with lever-arm shock-absorbers. The rear suspension was semi-trailing arms with torsion-bars and lever-arm shock-absorbers. Steering was rack-and-pinion from the PL17. Braking was by System ETA (évécuation thermale accéléré), with a light alloy drum on the outside of the wheel for cooling and an iron lining. Tires were Michelin XAS FF 145x380 front and rear.

The Panhard CD debuted at the 1962 Salon de l'Auto in Paris. Due to problems encountered producing the fibreglass bodies the first cars were not delivered until April 1963. In September 1964, the Panhard CD won the Grand Prix de l'Art et de l'Industrie Automobiles Français (Sports and Grand Touring category) at the Paris Salon de l'Auto.

From 1963 to July 1965, 179 cars were sold: 122 GTs and 57 Rallyes. Adding the five CD Dyna brings the total production for all cars to 184. The chassis numbers began with 101 for the first steel-bodied prototype, went from 102 to 105 for the rest of the CD Dynas and then continued into the production series with numbers from 106 to 284. According to some sources three additional cars were left unassembled.

== The Panhard LM64 ==
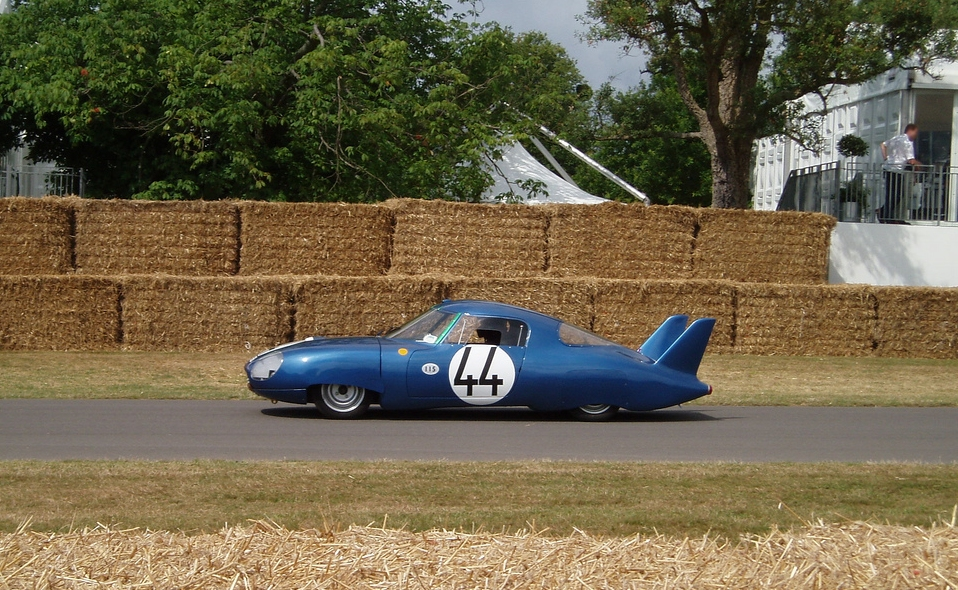
LM64

After going to Le Mans in 1963 with a car powered by a DKW two-stroke three-cylinder engine, Deutsch returned in 1964 with a new ultra-streamlined Panhard-powered car called the LM64. Two cars were built; LM64/1 and LM64/2. These cars retained the central backbone chassis from the production Panhard CD, revised by Jean Claude Haenel. The transverse leaf spring in the front suspension was replaced by coil springs.

Once again, Romani took the lead shaping the body. He produced a shape with completely covered headlamps, smooth sides with front and rear wheel spats and a smooth underfloor with a section towards the rear of the car shaped like a diffuser in an early use of "effet de sol" or "ground effect" to produce down-force. A more obvious feature was the two large vertical fins at the rear for stability at high speeds. The result of this work was that the LM64s had a drag coefficient even lower than that of the Panhard CD, with a $\scriptstyle C_\mathrm d\,$ of just 0.12.

Due to safety concerns, cars with engines smaller than 1 litre were not allowed to run at Le Mans beginning in 1964. To overcome that restriction, the engine in the LM64s received a Sferma supercharger along with other changes that included twin-ignition and dual Zenith carburetors. By applying the 1.4 multiplication factor for engines with forced-induction the effective displacement of the 848 cc Panhard engines rose to 1187 cc making the car eligible for the under 1200 cc class. Power output was up to 58.2 kW (78 hp). The transaxle used was a ZF 5-speed unit.

=== Racing the LM64 ===
One of the LM64s appeared at the Le Mans test. Driver Alain Bertault posted the 33rd fastest time. One car was slated to appear at the 1000 km of Nürburgring but did not arrive.

Both LM64s were entered at Le Mans in 1964. Guy Verrier and Pierre Lelong drove LM64/1 with car number 45. They qualified 55th, but were forced to retire when their gearbox failed. LM64/2, driven by the team of André Guilhaudin and Alain Bertault, received car number 44. This car qualified 54th but left the race before its sister car due to a failed engine.

Deutsch did not race the cars again. LM64/1 was kept in storage until 1979. LM64/2 was stored until 1981 when it was displayed at the Le Mans museum. Both cars appeared at the 2004 Le Mans Classic race and LM64/2 later appeared at Goodwood Festivals of Speed.

== Model comparison ==
Model	CD Dyna	Panhard CD GT	Panhard CD Rallye	LM64
Years	1962	July 1963 to July 1965		1964
Engine	2-Cylinder 4-stroke OHV Boxer			Supercharged 2-Cylinder 4-stroke OHV Boxer
Bore x stroke	77.2 mm × 75.0 mm (3.04 in × 2.95 in)	84.85 mm × 75.0 mm (3.34 in × 2.95 in)		
Displacement	702 cc (42.8 cu in)^{1}	848 cc (51.7 cu in)		
Horsepower	44.7 kW (60 hp)	37.3 kW (50 hp)	44.7 kW (60 hp)	58.2 kW (78 hp)
Transaxle	Panhard 4-speed manual			ZF 5-speed manual
Length	4,000 mm (157.5 in)	4,060 mm (159.8 in)		4,250 mm (167.3 in)
Width	1,600 mm (63.0 in)			1,640 mm (64.6 in)
Height	1,185 mm (46.7 in)			1,070 mm (42.1 in)
Wheelbase	2,250 mm (88.6 in)			2,270 mm (89.4 in)
Track F/R	1,200 / 1,100 mm (47.2 / 43.3 in)			
Weight	546 kg (1,203.7 lb)	580 kg (1,278.7 lb)		560 kg (1,234.6 lb)
Note:^{1}The first development engine displaced 954 cc. Following the 1962 Le Mans race it was installed in chassis 105 to participate in the 1962 Tour Auto.
